= Asami Sato =

Fictional character in The Legend of Korra

- Avatar Legends character
- Asami Sato in The Legend of Korra.
- First appearance: "The Voice in the Night" (2012)
- Created by: Michael Dante DiMartino; Bryan Konietzko
- Designed by: Michael Dante DiMartino; Bryan Konietzko
- Voiced by: Seychelle Gabriel

In-universe information
- Species: Human
- Gender: Female
- Occupation: Industrialist
- Family: Hiroshi Sato (father; deceased); Yasuko Sato (mother; deceased)
- Spouses: Korra (wife in Seven Havens; girlfriend in Book Four: Balance, Turf Wars, Ruins of the Empire, and Patterns in Time)
- Significant others: Mako (ex-boyfriend; Book One: Air)
- Nationality: United Republic of Nations
- Bending element: None

Asami Sato (佐藤麻尾; Zuǒ Téng Má Wěi) is a major character in the Nickelodeon animated television series The Legend of Korra (2012–2014) and is part of the Avatar: The Last Airbender world. The character and the series, a sequel to Avatar: The Last Airbender (2005–2008), were created by Michael Dante DiMartino and Bryan Konietzko. She is voiced by Seychelle Gabriel. The series' final scene, indicating the beginning of a romantic relationship between Asami and the female lead character, Korra, was unprecedented in its representation of LGBTQ persons in western children's television, with the characters' relationship fully explored in the comic continuations Turf Wars (2017–2018), Ruins of the Empire (2019–2020), and Patterns in Time (2022–2023).

Unlike many characters in the world of The Legend of Korra, Asami is not able to "bend", or telekinetically create, control and manipulate any of the four elements: water, earth, fire or air/wind. She is the only child of wealthy industrialist Hiroshi Sato, who invented the "Satomobile" (car) and whose company, Future Industries, is headquartered in Republic City. Asami is a skilled engineer, pilot and driver, and a competent unarmed combatant.

Asami has been well-received with publications. Many reviewers were content with her growth past being a love interest for Mako, and felt the relationship was not worth reviving. However, reception to her relationship with Korra was mostly positively received.

== Creation and conception ==
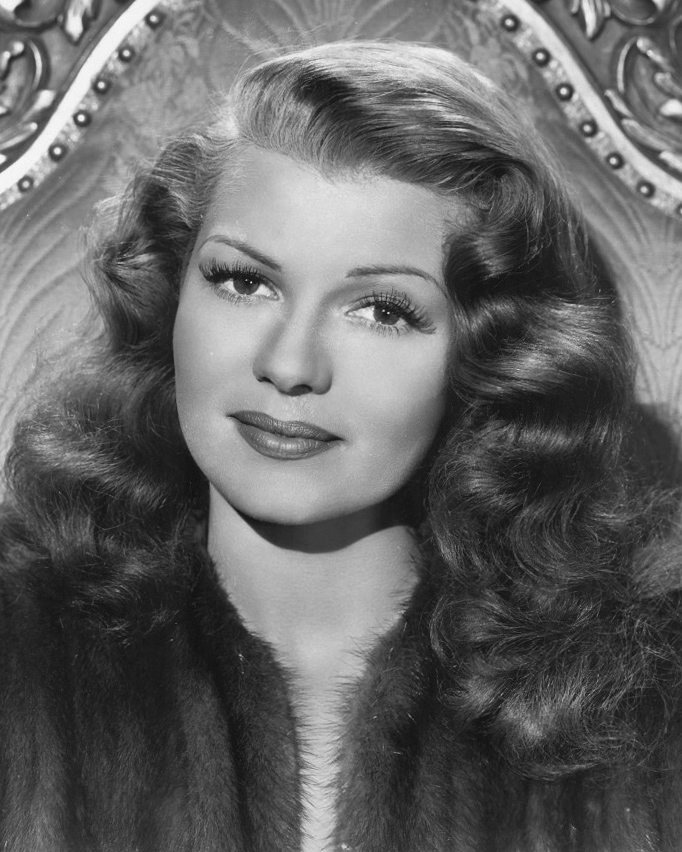
Rita Hayworth's hair inspired Asami's design.

Asami Sato was initially conceived to be a duplicitous spy for the Equalist movement — antagonists in the first season of The Legend of Korra — embedded within Team Avatar. However, the character became so well-liked by co-creators Michael Dante DiMartino and Bryan Konietzko that they rewrote her to be a friend to Korra, involved in a love triangle with her and Mako, and ignorant of her father's Equalist activities. DiMartino remembered that he and Konietzko "knew" they needed "a character who wasn't a bender" after they decided on the nonbender revolution storyline. Konietzko also floated the idea to the writing team that Asami might be bisexual "before the audience had ever laid eyes on" either her or Korra, but initially shelved the idea, assuming Nickelodeon would not allow it to be aired. This decision would be reversed after season two.

An early script for the last episode of the first season, "Endgame", featured Asami joining the United Forces, a military in the universe of The Legend of Korra, at the end of the episode. The script was reworked sometime before the confirmation of the second season. Bryan Konietzko's design of Asami was based on the idea of an actress from the "Golden Age" of Hollywood in the world of Avatar, and her hair was inspired by that of Rita Hayworth, an American actress famous in the 1940s. Konietzko wrote that Asami's resemblance to the character Lust from the 2009 anime series Fullmetal Alchemist: Brotherhood was coincidental, as he had not seen the series at the time of Asami's design in 2010. Konietzko had previously had difficulty drawing women and chose to design Asami by himself, wanting a challenge.

=== Design ===
Asami's initial character design, from when she was meant to be an Equalist spy, was left unchanged after co-creators DiMartino and Konietzko rewrote her to be an ally instead. Her design led viewers to speculate that the character would be a "femme fatale" when she first appeared. After it was revealed that she was not an Equalist spy, The A.V. Club noted that "it turns out that Asami's not bad—she's just drawn that way."

Throughout the first three seasons of The Legend of Korra, Asami consistently is seen wearing a red and gray jacket, dark red turtleneck dress, pink leggings and black boots. In her introductory episode "The Voice in the Night", Asami is also seen wearing formal attire, two different dresses, one while on her initial date with Mako and the other while attending a gala with him. Asami is also seen during the first season wearing a suit whenever involved in actual combat, which she retains throughout the series and wears the most during the third season when journey with Team Avatar. Her coat, which debuted in the season two (2013) episode "Rebel Spirit", was based on one Konietzko saw on a Japanese fashion website. She is only seen wearing the coat during the second season.

Asami Sato as she appeared in season four; three years older, a bit taller, and with a changed hairstyle.

The character was given a slightly different design in the fourth and final season of the series, which was revealed via a trailer for the season in September 2014. Asami was shown to have a different hairstyle, different clothing and grown in height. Her design went through a series of revisions, which included appearances with a hat and different hairstyles. DiMartino wrote that he loved the final version of her fourth season appearance, finding it to be a "nice balance of formal business attire and fashion-forward elegance." Entertainment Monthly wrote that while her appearance had changed, she still retained "the image of a businesswoman not to be messed with". Noriel Espinueva of Hallels felt the character looked "even more mature", adding that the design change contributed to the narrative that much had changed during the three-year gap between the third and fourth seasons of the series. The A.V. Club found her clothing to be more business-oriented than her previous attire and her hair to be worn in a similar manner to her mother.

=== Voice ===
Asami is voiced by Seychelle Gabriel. Gabriel's first involvement in the Avatar franchise was portraying Yue in The Last Airbender. Gabriel initially remembered Asami's name due to it sounding like "salami". Gabriel was announced to be playing the role in March 2011, along with the rest of the main cast for the first season. Gabriel received The Legend of Korra scripts days before recording and was surprised by Asami turning against her father, calling it a "really weird situation to wrap your head around" as Asami had lost both of her parents. Gabriel was well-aware of the comparisons between Asami and Batman, having seen an Internet meme highlighting this and she and her parents were supportive of the friendship between Asami and Korra. She especially liked that they were two girls who did not let "a guy get between them", feeling that they were stronger together as well. While listing actors that he felt bore a resemblance to the characters of The Legend of Korra and could potentially play them in a live-action film, Tommy DePaoli of Moviepilot mentioned her as a suitable candidate, writing that Gabriel "would make an impeccable Asami."

== Appearances ==
=== The Legend of Korra television series ===
==== Book One: Air (2012) ====
Asami Sato first appears in the series in the season one episode "The Voice in the Night", wherein she meets Mako by hitting him with her moped in a minor traffic accident. Recognizing him as the captain of the pro-bending team "Fire Ferrets", she invites him out to dinner by way of apology. She being a fan of pro-bending, she offers to become the team's sponsor. She meets Korra at a gala thrown in her honor by Tarrlok, commenting that Mako had told her much about her and making Korra jealous. On a date with Mako in Republic City Park, she expresses her trust in him while resting against him. She was a supporter of the "Fire Ferrets" and visible in attending their matches. Without running it by her father, Asami offers Mako and his brother Bolin a place to stay at her father's estate in the aftermath of an Equalist attack on the Pro-bending Arena. Asami takes the brothers and Korra to a racetrack to watch the test-driving of the Satomobiles. Noticing Korra's excitement in seeing them, she takes her on a ride while at the same time racing against one of the drivers, encouraging her to "mix it up sometimes." This is the first time Asami and Korra are mutually friendly to each other. Asami's mother is later revealed to have been murdered during a triad robbery of their mansion when she was six years old. Her father, Hiroshi Sato, maintained a hatred of all benders thereafter - this is his motivation for joining the Equalists, an anti-bending movement that served as the antagonistic group of season one. Upon discovering her father's role, Asami joins with Korra, Bolin, and Mako, to form the Team Avatar, turning against her father. This leads to a battle against Hiroshi Sato and his mecha, during which her father attempts to kill her. With Bolin's help, she defeats and captures Hiroshi. Asami's relationship with Mako faces difficulty when she becomes suspicious of him having romantic feelings for Korra when he only briefly addresses her before continuing his search for her, leading her to wonder why he is so concerned. She questions Bolin about it and presses the evasive earthbender about his brother, who he reveals previously shared a kiss with Korra. Following the group finding her, she confronted Mako over their kiss and when he tried to schedule their conversation for another time, she alluded to the possibility of breaking up with him before they could do so. She shows her disappointment with Mako exclusively, not blaming Korra for the deterioration of their relationship. Mako later pulls her aside to express how much he cares for her. In response, Asami relates her own positive feelings for him and kisses him on the cheek, ending their romance on a good note.

==== Book Two: Spirits (2013) ====
Between seasons one and two, and following her father's imprisonment, Asami assumes control of Future Industries. With the reputation of the company in tatters, Asami needs to collaborate with the entrepreneur Varrick to save her company from bankruptcy. However, Varrick is later found to be committing acts of violence, fraud, and theft to entangle the Republic in the Water Tribe Civil War. After Varrick is arrested, the deal is nullified, and Asami regains full control of her company. Future Industries becomes an economic powerhouse; Asami herself becomes an urban planner, leading the reconstruction of Republic City's infrastructure after the physical return of Spirit World creatures to the human world. She briefly resumes her relationship with Mako after confiding in him in the midst of his investigation of the stolen shipment of mecha tanks, though she initially apologizes before he reassures her and the two relive their first date as he was arrested by officers who had incriminating evidence on him after interviewing the arrested Triple Threat Triad members, Asami learning and being shocked that he had explosives and a detonator in his back room and being unsure of what to believe when he blames Varrick. Asami chooses not to visit Mako in prison due to its location reminding her of her father and instead spends time with his brother Bolin and later Korra, who forgot her breakup with Mako after being attacked by a dark spirit and losing a part of her memory. When the three go to pick up Mako from jail, Asami becomes angry with him for not telling Korra that they were in a relationship again. Asami is a participant in the civil war between the Southern and Northern Water Tribes, steering a battle ship she had acquired from Varrick as she picks up a distress signal from the Southern Water Tribe rebels, though she and the others opt to continue towards the Southern Water Tribe where she suggests herself acting as a diversion by launching an aerial assault, which she carries out and is eventually brought down by Desna and Eska, Korra's twin cousins. After being apprehended and while imprisoned alongside the others, she is freed by Bumi and accepts Korra's request to fly her father Tonraq so he can seek treatment for his injuries. Remaining there with Tonraq, Katara and Tonraq's wife Senna, Asami watches over Jinora and learns after she wakes that the others are safe and Korra has saved the world, relieving her.

==== Book Three: Change (2014) ====
Throughout season three, Asami and Korra's friendship deepens. During a ride in Asami's car, the two engage in a friendly but honest discussion about Mako, whom they had both dated. They express happiness and relief that their "rivalry" over Mako did not destroy their friendship. This is the first time Korra refers to Asami as a "girlfriend", although at this point the term is not used romantically. When Korra decides to seek out new airbenders, Asami joins her team and also provides a Future Industries airship for them to use in their search. From that point on Asami and Korra spend a significant amount of time with each other, seeking out new airbenders, fighting against bandits and investigating a faction known as the Red Lotus. After both being captured by Earth Kingdom forces, they work as a team to escape from the Earth Kingdom airship where they were being held captive, resulting in the airship crashing into a desert. Asami is able to design a sand-sailer from the wreckage, which she, Korra, and their former captors collaborate to build. Following an attack from the Red Lotus on the Northern Air Temple, Asami volunteers to watch over Korra's body when Korra visits the Spirit World in an attempt to contact the leader of the Red Lotus, Zaheer. The final battle in "Venom of the Red Lotus" at the end of season three leaves Korra wheelchair-reliant. Asami becomes her day-to-day caretaker during the first phase of her recovery.

==== Book Four: Balance (2014) ====
The series' final shot, showing Asami and Korra becoming a romantic couple, was seen as pushing the boundaries of LGBTQ representation in children's TV.

In the fourth season, it is shown that Korra's recovery process takes three years, which she mostly spends at the South Pole. Asami is the only member of Team Avatar with whom Korra maintains contact during this time, as they write to each other about their fears and vulnerabilities. During this time, Asami designs the airbender wingsuits seen throughout the season, which are built by Future Industries. While Korra is absent, Asami meets with her jailed father, Hiroshi Sato. Asami reveals that she has been receiving but not reading her father's prison letters, and demands that he stop trying to reconcile. However, the relationship thaws as Hiroshi apologies, acknowledges his crimes, and expresses his pride in Asami, stating that Asami was the "greatest thing he ever created". Out for dinner with friends, Asami accidentally reveals that she and Korra had maintained correspondence, despite Korra's silence with everyone else, provoking resentment from Mako and prompting him to demand, "What's been going on between you two?" Also, when Asami reveals she has visited her father, Korra objects, asking if Asami really feels Hiroshi could be trusted. Asami angrily responds that she is well aware of her father's capabilities, and asserts that it is not Korra's place to second-guess her after being away for three years. Midway through season four, as the threat from Kuvira - now self-proclaimed founder of the Earth Empire - builds, Asami is summoned to Republic City Hall and ordered to work with Varrick to find a way to counter Kuvira's growing military threat. Asami agrees reluctantly, reminding Varrick she has not forgotten his past betrayals. Asami also reunites with her father, Hiroshi, who is allowed out of jail temporarily for the same purposes. As they prepare for a last-stand defensive effort, Asami tells her father she loves him, a sentiment he immediately returns. Hiroshi Sato dies in the battle, saving his daughter in an act of self-sacrifice, validating Asami's acceptance, and completing their reconciliation arc. Afterward, Asami has a private conversation with Korra, in which Korra apologizes to Asami for their years apart and Asami reveals how she could not have coped with the loss of her father and Korra on the same day, the two settling on taking a vacation together in the Spirit World. Korra and Asami later step into the spirit portal, turn to face each other, hold both hands and gaze into each other's eyes as the camera swings upwards into the portal, officially signaling the start of their romantic involvement.

=== The Legend of Korra comic series ===
==== Turf Wars (2017–2018) ====
In part one, Korra and Asami spend time in the Spirit World exploring their romantic feelings for each other. The pair travel to the Southern Water Tribe to reveal their relationship to Korra's parents, both of whom are happy and supportive upon hearing the news, though Tonraq warns Korra that the rest of the world may not be as accepting of a same-sex relationship. Upon returning to Republic City, the couple meet tycoon Wongyong Keum who plans to form an amusement park on the land surrounding the Spirit Portal. Asami loses her temper, recalling Kuem's shady dealings with her own father, and orders him to leave. Asami begins drawing up plans for new housing developments for the people who have displaced following Kuvira's assault, which President Raiko agrees to help fund along with Future Industries and Varrick Industries. At Air Temple Island, Korra and Asami receive advice from Kya on their relationship and the history of how same-sex relationships have been viewed in their world. Asami helps the Air Nomads when the Triple Threat triad, on Keum's orders, attempt to drive them away from the Spirit Portal. Asami is nearly killed in the fighting, distracting Korra and allowing a dragon-eel spirit to attack the Triple Threat's new leader, Tokuga. In the aftermath of the battle, Korra kisses Asami out of relief, leading to Mako, Bolin, Jinora and Opal discovering their relationship. Three weeks after Tokuga's defeat, Korra told Asami she is in love with her, and Asami said she feels the same way about Korra.

=== Appearances in other media ===
In March 2015, Bryan Konietzko posted previously unseen artwork of Korra and Asami embracing, entitled Turtle-duck Date Night. The art was announced to be sold as an exclusive print for The Legend of Korra / Avatar: The Last Airbender Tribute Exhibition at Gallery Nucleus and that its proceeds would be donated by Konietzko to an LGBTQ suicide prevention hotline. After same-sex marriage was declared legal in all 50 states of the U.S., Konietzko posted a rainbow version of the artwork. Asami appears in The Legend of Korra books Revolution and Endgame, two novels that together adapt the first season of the series.

In the song "Puerto Rican Mami" by artist Young Miko, she mentions Asami Sato, which is not surprising to her fans since she has previously expressed her fondness for The Legend of Korra on social media.

== Characterization ==
=== Personality ===
Raised in wealth and luxury, Asami is introduced as a sweet, caring, and independent young woman capable of handling adverse situations; she has trained in self-defense combat since childhood, and is "more than able to take care of herself". Throughout the series, she maintains a collected and mature presence in the cast, using her wealth and abilities both to defend Republic City and to help others, defying both the daddy's little girl and bratty teenage daughter tropes. In a collection of highly emotional personalities, Asami is described by The A.V. Club as the "brains" of "Team Avatar 2.0." Asami's independence and strength of character leave her unafraid to stand up for her beliefs. She sides with her bender friends against her father, Hiroshi Sato, after he was revealed to be integral part of the anti-bender Equalist movement - a decision The A.V. Club referred to as "stone cold". After the events of the first season, Asami Sato evolved into a major in-universe business leader and was revealed to be a genius engineer/inventor, comparable with Bruce Wayne. DiMartino specifically compared her post-season one background and capabilities - although not personality - to those of Batman.

Hallmarked through much of the series by her equanimity, Asami is naturally a very logical and forward thinking person, never allowing her emotions to cloud her judgement, and seldom maintains grudges over time. She never holds generalized prejudice against benders, despite losing her mother as to a murderous triad firebender in her childhood; she harbors little long-term ill will towards Mako after their romantic breakup, remaining friends after a period of upset - she even shows little animosity towards Korra after the Avatar 'stole' her then-boyfriend Mako. Instead, she develops a deeper friendship with Korra - so much so that the two become romantically involved in season four. The major exception to this theme is the resentment Asami carries against her father, Hiroshi, for both his emotional betrayal and physical attempt on her life. She musters no sympathy or forgiveness toward him for several years, preferring to keep him out of her life, and refusing his attempts at reconciliation. However, after receiving a heartfelt apology from jail, and coming through correspondence to understand how much he was suffering from his own guilt, she eventually forgives him, echoing familial-reconciliation themes exhibited throughout The Legend of Korra.

=== Skills ===
Asami is shown to be a practical thinker and a capable engineer, able to repair and construct vehicles and other period technology with limited resources, such as when she improvised a makeshift sand-sailer using materials from a destroyed airship. She is also a skilled Pai Sho player, proving to be an effective strategist. Although she is a non-bender, Asami is highly proficient in hand-to-hand combat, a result of her father having her to be trained by the best self-defense teachers in Republic City from an early age after the death of her mother so that she would always be able to defend herself. Her weapon of choice is an electrified glove, which she typically uses to incapacitate her opponents. Asami is particularly nimble in combat, once eluding attacks from five chi blockers before using her electrified glove to stun them all. Additionally, Asami is Team Avatar's de facto machine operator. Asami is an excellent automobile and moped/motorcycle driver in a technological period where that is new, having learned through test-driving her father's Satomobile line of vehicles; she taught Avatar Korra to drive, as well. Asami can also pilot airships, and operate other machinery such as motorboats, sand-sailers, and forklifts. Having assisted her father in operating their company before assuming engineering and management responsibilities, she has developed a keen eye for discerning high quality design and construction from subpar work, and utilizes this knowledge to further Team Avatar's goals in episodes such as season three's "Long Live the Queen".

== Reception ==
Asami Sato's role in the series has been met with acclaim. As an engineer and leader in a STEM field, Asami has been praised as an inspiration for young girls to pursue a career in such fields, particularly by LGBTQ-friendly commentators and fans. While initially criticized as underdeveloped, the character was praised for growing beyond her initial depiction as an apparent romantic foil into a successful CEO. Tyler Edwards of The Artifice called her "a great example of a formidable woman", citing her status as the only main character without bending abilities and her compensating by using her martial arts and technology in place of it. Zach Blumenfeld of Paste ranked Asami as the 7th best character from the Avatar universe, noting that Asami is "badass" and displays "immense emotional maturity" throughout the series.

The character's initial role as the romantic rival to the series' protagonist, Korra, was also called into question. While Max Nicholson of IGN enjoyed the rivalry, other reviewers felt that Asami was more likeable and sympathetic than Korra, making it difficult to root for the latter. Reviewer Jason Krell criticized the brief reintroduction of the Asami-Mako relationship in Season 2. Krell commended the character for not prioritizing the relationship when "more important things were at stake", but felt Asami "should know better than to take Mako back for a second time." Noel Kirkpatrick wrote that he did not understand why either Asami or Korra had been interested in Mako "aside from the fact that he's the only single dude around who wasn't Bolin."

The depiction of the character's complex relationship with her father also received praise. Nicholson expressed that her falling out with her father Hiroshi Sato would make a "compelling moral struggle" and compared their relationship to that of Avatar: The Last Airbender's Zuko and his father Ozai. Asami's interactions with her father after he redeems himself in the fourth season were seen as "poignant scenes". The scene prior to his sacrifice, in which she realized he would soon be killed, was viewed as "heartbreaking".

=== Relationship with Korra ===
The depiction of a romantic relationship between Asami and Korra in the show's final moments received widespread praise. Vanity Fair praised the writers for taking "a tired dynamic between two women and turn[ing] it into something fresh and exciting," while Polygon wrote that by portraying Korra and Asami as bisexual, the series even avoided the error of assuming sexual orientation to be a strict divide between "gay" and "straight". Some reviewers felt that the two characters complemented each other well as a couple, with Korra's brashness balancing Asami's calm nature. Joshua Rivera of Entertainment Weekly praised the ending scene, writing that after struggling with their legacies, Korra and Asami have rejected the world's expectations of them so as to make their own destiny.

Korra and Asami's relationship has also been noted for being a "landmark moment for American and family animation." The Advocate included Korra and Asami in their 2017 list of "35 LGBT Characters Who Redefined Family TV", noting that the series "ended on a note that changed family television forever." In 2018, io9 ranked the series finale's reveal of Korra and Asami's relationship #55 on its list of "The 100 Most Important Pop Culture Moments of the Last 10 Years".

Among the critics who viewed the pairing negatively, E. Steven Burnett of Christ and Pop Culture wrote that the depiction of a same-sex relationship "hijacks Korra's story in service of social causes to the detriment of its own creative storytelling." Daniel Rodrigues-Martin of Geeks Under Grace agreed that the pairing was a detriment to the characters and story, opining that there was no foreshadowing of a romantic relationship between the two characters until the series' final moments.

In response to criticism that the relationship was thrown in to appeal to fans who "shipped" Korra and Asami, Konietzko pointed out that any decision they made regarding Asami's romantic life could be interpreted as caving to a specific group of fans who supported Asami being paired with a certain character, and claimed that at the end of the day, the creators went for the relationship that felt right to them. He also suggested that anyone who felt the relationship was not adequately foreshadowed had watched the last two seasons only expecting to see heterosexual relationships. Gay Star News agreed that the romantic relationship between Asami and Korra has been heavily foreshadowed. Prior to the airing of the series finale, the two characters had drawn comparisons to Aang and Katara's relationship in Avatar: The Last Airbender.

Prior to the reveal of the romantic relationship, there was a positive reception to the friendship between Asami and Korra, the two being viewed as "perfect partners" in that their personalities and abilities complemented each other. The Mary Sue noted Asami's role in Korra's recovery from PTSD, while The A.V. Club pointed out that Korra only writing back to Asami out of all her friends showed the strength and growth of their relationship. The relationship was praised for having realism, including depictions of disagreements between the two. Nicholson called the friendship his "favorite character dynamic" of the third season. On the other hand, Juliet Kahn of ComicsAlliance did not understand what "binds" Asami and Korra together due to Asami's underdeveloped personality.
