= The Legend of Korra =

American animated television series

- Also known as: Avatar: The Legend of Korra
- Genre: Action; Adventure; Fantasy; Comedy-Drama; Steampunk; Coming-of-age
- Created by: Michael Dante DiMartino; Bryan Konietzko
- Showrunners: Michael Dante DiMartino; Bryan Konietzko
- Written by: Michael Dante DiMartino; Bryan Konietzko; Tim Hedrick; Joshua Hamilton; Katie Mattila
- Directed by: Joaquim Dos Santos; Ki Hyun Ryu; Colin Heck; Ian Graham; Melchior Zwyer; Michael Dante DiMartino
- Voices of: Janet Varney; Seychelle Gabriel; David Faustino; P. J. Byrne; J. K. Simmons; Mindy Sterling; Kiernan Shipka; Dee Bradley Baker
- Composers: Jeremy Zuckerman; Benjamin Wynn
- Country of origin: United States
- Original language: English
- No. of seasons: 4
- No. of episodes: 52 (list of episodes)

Production
- Executive producers: Michael Dante DiMartino; Bryan Konietzko; Yu Jae Myoung
- Producer: Tim Yoon
- Editors: Jeff Adams; Christopher Hink
- Running time: 23 minutes
- Production companies: Ginormous Madman Films; Nickelodeon Animation Studio

Original release
- Network: Nickelodeon
- Release: April 14, 2012 – July 25, 2014
- Network: Nick.com
- Release: August 1 – December 19, 2014

Related
- Avatar: The Last Airbender franchise

The Legend of Korra (abbreviated as TLOK and also known as Avatar: The Legend of Korra or more rarely simply as Korra) is an American animated fantasy action television series created by Michael Dante DiMartino and Bryan Konietzko for Nickelodeon. It is a sequel to their previous series Avatar: The Last Airbender (2005–2008), and ran for 52 episodes ("chapters") across four seasons ("books") from April 14, 2012, to December 19, 2014. It has since continued as a comic book series.

Like its predecessor, the series is set in a fictional universe where certain people can telekinetically manipulate, or "bend", one of the four elements: water, earth, fire, or air. Only one individual, the "Avatar", can bend all four elements, and is responsible for maintaining balance in the world. The series follows Avatar Korra, the successor and reincarnation of Aang from the previous series, as she faces political and spiritual unrest in a modernizing world.

The main characters are voiced by Janet Varney, Seychelle Gabriel, David Faustino, P. J. Byrne, J. K. Simmons and Mindy Sterling, and supporting voice actors include Aubrey Plaza, John Michael Higgins, Kiernan Shipka, Lisa Edelstein, Steve Blum, Eva Marie Saint, Henry Rollins, Anne Heche, and Zelda Williams. Some of the people who worked on Avatar: The Last Airbender (including designer Joaquim Dos Santos, writers Joshua Hamilton and Tim Hedrick, composer Jeremy Zuckerman and sound designer Benjamin Wynn) returned to work on The Legend of Korra.

The Legend of Korra received critical acclaim, with praise for its animation, writing, production values and ambitious themes. The show has been nominated for and won awards such as the Annie Awards, a Daytime Emmy Award, and a Gracie Award. The series was also praised for addressing sociopolitical issues such as social unrest and terrorism, as well as for going beyond the established boundaries of youth entertainment with respect to issues of race, gender, and sexual orientation. The series' final scene, intended to depict the beginning of a same-sex romance between Korra and Asami Sato, was unprecedented at the time and has been credited with paving the way for LGBT representation in children's television.

== Series overview ==
The Legend of Korra was initially conceived as a twelve-episode miniseries. Nickelodeon declined the creators' pitch for an Avatar: The Last Airbender follow-up animated film based on what then became the three-part comics The Promise, The Search and The Rift, choosing instead to expand Korra to 26 episodes. The series was expanded further in July 2012 to 52 episodes. These episodes are grouped into four separate seasons ("Books") composed of twelve to fourteen episodes ("Chapters") each, with each season telling a stand-alone story. Beginning with episode 9 of season 3, new episodes were first distributed through the Internet rather than broadcast. The Legend of Korra concluded with its fourth season.

Book	Name	Episodes	Originally released		
Book	Name	Episodes	First released	Last released	Network
1	Air	12	April 14, 2012	June 23, 2012	Nickelodeon
2	Spirits	14	September 13, 2013	November 22, 2013	Nickelodeon
3	Change	13	June 27, 2014	August 22, 2014	Nickelodeon; Nick.com
4	Balance	13	October 3, 2014	December 19, 2014	Nick.com

=== Setting ===
The Legend of Korra is set in the fictional world of Avatar: The Last Airbender, 70 years after the events of that series. The people of the world belong to four nations: the Water Tribes, the Earth Kingdom, the Fire Nation, and the monastic Air Nomads. The distinguishing element of the series is "bending", the ability of some people to telekinetically manipulate the classical element associated with their nation or heritage (water, earth, fire, or air). Bending is carried out by spiritual and physical exercises, portrayed as similar to Chinese martial arts. Only one person, the Avatar, can bend all four elements. Cyclically reincarnating among the world's four nations, the Avatar maintains peace and balance in the world. The Legend of Korra focuses on Avatar Korra, a seventeen-year-old girl from the Southern Water Tribe and the successor of Avatar Aang from The Last Airbender.

The first season is mostly set in Republic City, the capital of the United Republic of Nations, a new multicultural sovereign state founded by Avatar Aang after the end of The Last Airbender. The 1920s-inspired metropolis is described as "if Manhattan had happened in Asia" by the series' creators, and its residents are united by their passion for "pro-bending", a spectator sport in which two teams composed of an earthbender, waterbender, and firebender throw each other out of a ring using bending techniques. Rapid technological growth has displaced the spirituality of bending, and what was considered a renowned martial art in Avatar: The Last Airbender is now commonplace, with benders in Republic City using their abilities to commit crime, compete in spectator sports, and fulfill everyday jobs. The second season adds the southern polar region, home of the Southern Water Tribe, as a main setting in addition to Republic City, while the third and fourth seasons take place largely in the Earth Kingdom.

=== Synopsis ===
The first season, Book One: Air, sees Korra move to Republic City to learn airbending from Tenzin, Avatar Aang's son. She joins a pro-bending team alongside brothers Bolin and Mako, and befriends Asami Sato, heiress to a leading engineering corporation. The ambitious politician Tarrlok enlists Korra to fight the anti-bender uprising of the "Equalists", led by the masked Amon, who strips benders of their abilities. Korra and her friends, aided by Tenzin and police chief Lin Beifong, unmask Amon as a waterbender himself and Tarrlok's brother, ending the Equalists' coup.

In the second season, Book Two: Spirits, Korra's uncle Unalaq, chief of the Northern Water Tribe, seizes power in the southern tribe. While Korra's friends seek support against Unalaq, Korra learns of the first Avatar, Wan, who fused his soul with the spirit of light, Raava, to imprison Vaatu, the spirit of darkness. Unalaq frees Vaatu during the Harmonic Convergence, a decamillennial alignment of planets, and unites with him to become a dark Avatar. After defeating Unalaq, Korra chooses to leave open the portals between the material world and the spirit world, allowing a new coexistence of spirits and humans.

The third season, Book Three: Change, begins as non-benders develop airbending powers as a result of Harmonic Convergence, and Tenzin, Korra, and her friends attempt to recruit them to re-establish the extinct Air Nomads. One new airbender is Zaheer, the leader of the anarchist Red Lotus society. The Red Lotus assassinates the Earth Queen, throwing her kingdom into chaos, and captures Korra in an attempt to kill her and end the Avatar cycle. They are defeated by Korra's friends and the new airbenders, but Korra is severely injured and psychologically traumatized.

The final season, Book Four: Balance, takes place three years later. Korra is slowly recovering from her mental and physical trauma and has cut contact with most of her friends. Meanwhile, the metalbender Kuvira, assigned to reunite the fractured Earth Kingdom, declares herself head of the new, authoritarian "Earth Empire". She builds a spirit-powered superweapon and attempts to conquer Republic City. Korra reunites with her friends to stop Kuvira and destroy her weapon, whose released spirit energy creates a new portal to the Spirit World in the heart of Republic City. The series ends with the prospect of democracy for the former Earth Kingdom, as Korra and Asami leave together for a vacation in the Spirit World.

== Cast and characters ==
Main cast
Janet Varney	Seychelle Gabriel	David Faustino	P. J. Byrne	J. K. Simmons	Mindy Sterling	Kiernan Shipka	Dee Bradley Baker
Janet Varney	Seychelle Gabriel	David Faustino	P. J. Byrne	J. K. Simmons	Mindy Sterling	Kiernan Shipka	Dee Bradley Baker
Korra	Asami Sato	Mako	Bolin	Tenzin	Lin Beifong	Jinora	Tarrlok, Naga, Pabu, Oogi

Korra (Janet Varney) is the series' 17-year-old "headstrong and rebellious" protagonist, and Aang's reincarnation as the Avatar. Her transformation "from brash warrior to a spiritual being", according to DiMartino, is a principal theme of the series. The character was inspired by Bryan Konietzko's "pretty tough" sister, and by female MMA fighters.

The series focuses on Korra and her friends, sometimes called "Team Avatar", which include the bending brothers Mako and Bolin and the non-bender Asami. Mako (David Faustino), the older brother, is a firebender described as "dark and brooding". The character was named after the late Mako Iwamatsu, the voice actor for Iroh in the first two seasons of the original series. His younger brother Bolin (P. J. Byrne) is an earthbender described as lighthearted, humorous, and "always [having] a lady on his arm". Asami Sato (Seychelle Gabriel), the only non-bender among the leading characters, is the daughter of the wealthy industrialist Hiroshi Sato.

The other main characters are the airbending master Tenzin, one of Aang's grown children (J. K. Simmons), and his family, which include his wife Pema (Maria Bamford) and their daughters Jinora (Kiernan Shipka) and Ikki (Darcy Rose Byrnes) and sons Meelo (Logan Wells) and Rohan. Jinora is calm and an avid reader. She is an airbender and joins the main cast in season 2. Ikki is described as "fun, crazy, and a fast talker". Little brother Meelo is super-active and comically aggressive, and baby Rohan is born during the third-to-last episode of Book One. Other recurring characters include Republic City police chief Lin Beifong (Mindy Sterling), and Korra's animal friends Naga and Pabu (both Dee Bradley Baker, the voice of a number of animals including Appa and Momo in the original series). Pabu was inspired by Futa, a famous standing Japanese red panda. Jeff Bennett is the voice for Shiro Shinobi, the fast-talking probending match announcer in Book One. He also does the newsreel-like voice-overs for the short recaps during the opening sequence of each episode.

According to critic Mike Hoffman, the romantic interests of Korra and her companions are less in the foreground than in Avatar, and feature mainly in the first two seasons. In Book One, Bolin pines for Korra, who is interested in Mako, who dates Asami. By the end of the season, Mako has broken up with Asami and entered a relationship with Korra. This ends around the end of Book Two, during which Bolin suffers from an abusive relationship with the waterbender Eska. In the fourth season, Bolin dates the airbender Opal, while Asami and Korra become closer friends. The series' final scene indicates a romantic connection between them. Mike DiMartino wrote that the scene "symbolizes their evolution from being friends to being a couple". They continue in a relationship in the comics.

Book 1 recurring cast
Steve Blum	Eva Marie Saint	Lance Henriksen	Daniel Dae Kim	Clancy Brown
Steve Blum	Eva Marie Saint	Lance Henriksen	Daniel Dae Kim	Clancy Brown
Amon	Katara	Amon's lieutenant	Hiroshi Sato	Yakone

Book One: Air features two main adversaries for Korra: the Equalists' masked leader Amon (Steve Blum) who has the power to remove a person's bending-powers, and the ambitious, charismatic politician Tarrlok (Dee Bradley Baker), who resorts to increasingly repressive methods against the Equalists. Tenzin's parents Katara (Eva Marie Saint), and Avatar Aang (D. B. Sweeney), main characters of the Avatar: The Last Airbender series, also made recurring appearances. Chris Hardwick and Kate Higgins voiced Sokka and Toph Beifong in guest appearances. Amon's lieutenant is voiced by Lance Henriksen, and Asami's father Hiroshi Sato by Daniel Dae Kim. Sato's character, the self-made founder of Future Industries, was inspired by Theodore Roosevelt and by the Japanese industrialists Keita Goto and Iwasaki Yatarō. Rami Malek voices Tahno, a pro-bending athlete. Richard Epcar voices Saikhan, captain of the Republic City Metalbending Police Force. Both Amon and Tarrlok are identified as the sons of mob boss Yakone (Clancy Brown). Korra is also supported by General Iroh (Dante Basco, who voiced Zuko in the original series), a member of the United Forces who is described as "a swashbuckling hero-type guy". He is named after Iroh, Zuko's uncle in the original series.

Book 2 recurring cast
Lisa Edelstein	Aubrey Plaza	James Remar	Steven Yeun
Lisa Edelstein	Aubrey Plaza	James Remar	Steven Yeun
Kya	Eska	Tonraq	Wan

Book Two: Spirits features Tenzin's and Korra's families, including Tenzin's elder siblings Kya (Lisa Edelstein) and Bumi (Richard Riehle) as well as Korra's father Tonraq (James Remar) and mother Senna (Alex McKenna). Book 2 also introduces John Michael Higgins as the corrupt businessman and inventor Varrick, with Stephanie Sheh voicing his assistant Zhu Li, along with Korra's uncle Unalaq (Adrian LaTourelle), aided by his twin children Desna (Aaron Himelstein) and Eska (Aubrey Plaza), and Vaatu (Jonathan Adams), the spirit of disorder. Spencer Garrett joined the cast as the voice for Raiko, the president of the United Republic. The season also explains the Avatar mythos through the first Avatar Wan (Steven Yeun) and Vaatu's polar opposite Raava (April Stewart). Making a few appearances in Books Two and Three, Greg Baldwin reprises Iroh from the previous series. Set six months after the events of the first season, Book Two: Spirits sees Mako as a police officer, Asami in charge of Future Industries, and Bolin leading a new pro-bending team with little success.

Book 3 and 4 recurring cast
Henry Rollins	Grey DeLisle	Bruce Davison	Alyson Stoner	Anne Heche	Jim Meskimen	Zelda Williams
Henry Rollins	Grey DeLisle	Bruce Davison	Alyson Stoner	Anne Heche	Jim Meskimen	Zelda Williams
Zaheer	Ming-Hua	Zuko	Opal	Suyin Beifong	Baatar, Daw	Kuvira

The anarchist antagonists introduced in Book Three: Change, the Red Lotus, comprise the new airbender Zaheer (Henry Rollins), the armless waterbender Ming-Hua (Grey DeLisle, who previously voiced a dark spirit), the combustionbender P'Li (Kristy Wu), and the lavabender Ghazan (Peter Giles). Supporting characters include the Earth Queen Hou-Ting (Jayne Taini), the retired Fire Lord Zuko (Bruce Davison), Lin's half-sister Suyin Beifong (Anne Heche), Suyin's trusted advisor Aiwei (Maurice LaMarche) and her captain of the guards Kuvira (Zelda Williams). New airbenders are also introduced in the season including the young thief Kai (Skyler Brigmann) and Suyin's daughter Opal (Alyson Stoner), both of Earth Kingdom origins and the love interests of Jinora and Bolin respectively. Jim Meskimen voices a Republic City merchant and later airbender named Daw, as well as Suyin's husband, the architect Baatar. Jason Marsden as the voice for Huan, second oldest son of Suyin, along Marcus Toji voicing Wei and Wing are the twin sons of Suyin. Greg Cipes as the voice for Tu, the cousin of Mako and Bolin, along Susan Silo voices their grandmother Yin.

The final season, Book Four: Balance, features Kuvira as Korra's antagonist at the head of an army bent on uniting the Earth Kingdom. The cast is also joined by Sunil Malhotra as Prince Wu, the vain heir to the Earth Kingdom throne, and Todd Haberkorn as Baatar Jr., Suyin's estranged son who is Kuvira's fiancé and second-in-command. Philece Sampler voices the aged Toph Beifong, another returning character from Avatar whose young adult version was voiced by Kate Higgins in Books 1 and 3. April Stewart was cast as Zuko's daughter, Fire Lord Izumi, in a minor role.

== Production ==
=== Influences ===
The art design of Republic City, described as "if Manhattan had happened in Asia", was inspired by the 1920s and incorporates influences from American and European architecture from that time period. Elements of film noir and steampunk also influenced the city's art concept. The design for the metalbending police force is based on 1920s New York City police uniforms, crossed with samurai armor.

The fighting styles employed by characters in the original show Avatar: The Last Airbender were derived from different distinct styles of Chinese martial arts. Set 70 years later, the fighting style in the multicultural Republic City has modernized and blended, with the creators incorporating three primary styles: traditional Chinese martial arts, mixed martial arts, and tricking. The pro-bending sport introduced in the series was inspired by mixed martial arts (MMA) tournaments.

Chinese martial arts instructor Sifu Kisu consulted on Avatar: The Last Airbender and returned as a consultant for the fight scenes in The Legend of Korra. MMA fighters Jeremy Humphries and Mac Danzig were credited with "providing a lot of the moves you'll see in the Probending arena", and Steve Harada and Jake Huang provided the stylized flips and acrobatics of "tricking" to the series' fighting style.

=== Development ===
Concept art of Korra overlooking Republic City, released after the announcement of the series

The Legend of Korra was co-created and produced by Bryan Konietzko and Michael Dante DiMartino at Nickelodeon Animation Studios in Burbank, California. To illustrate the length of the production process (about 10 to 12 months per episode) and the overlap of the various phases, Konietzko wrote in July 2013 that their team was already developing the storyboards for the first episode of Book 4 while the last episodes of Book 2 were not yet finished.

Production of the series was announced at the annual San Diego Comic-Con on July 22, 2010. It was originally due for release in October 2011. Tentatively titled Avatar: Legend of Korra at the time, it was intended to be a twelve-episode mini series set in the same fictional universe as the original show, but seventy years later. In 2011, the title was changed to The Last Airbender: Legend of Korra, and again in March 2012 to The Legend of Korra. The premiere was eventually delayed to April 14, 2012. South Korean animation studio Mir was involved in the pre-production, storyboarding and animation of the series which allows the studio more creative input on directing the martial arts scenes that the series and its predecessor are known for.

According to animation director Yoo Jae-myung, Nickelodeon was initially reluctant to approve the series and suspended production because, according to Konietzko, conventional wisdom had it that "girls will watch shows about boys, but boys won't watch shows about girls". The creators eventually persuaded the channel's executives to change their mind. Konietzko related that in test screenings, boys said that Korra being a girl did not matter to them.

The creators wrote all of the episodes of the first season themselves, omitting "filler episodes" to allow for a concise story. Once the series was expanded from its original 12-episode schedule to 26 and then to 52, more writers were brought in so that the creators could focus on design work. Joaquim Dos Santos and Ryu Ki-Hyun, who worked on the animation and design of the original series, also became involved with creating The Legend of Korra, as is storyboarder Ian Graham. Jeremy Zuckerman and Benjamin Wynn, who composed the soundtrack for the original series as "The Track Team," also returned to score The Legend of Korra.

The second season, Book Two: Spirits, premiered on September 13, 2013, and concluded on November 22, 2013. It consists of fourteen episodes. Animation work was done by the South Korean animation studio Mir as well as the Japanese animation studio Pierrot. Studio Mir was expected to solely work on Book 2, but executive director Jae-myung Yoo decided that Studio Mir would animate The Boondocks instead because the animation process was less rigorous. Pierrot was eventually called in to fill the void and animate Book 2. According to Jae-myung Yoo, Studio Mir was later contacted and re-asked to animate Book 2. Yoo feared that, if Book 2 failed, Studio Mir and Korean animators would have their reputations tarnished for Pierrot's failures. Consequently, Studio Mir accepted the offer and worked alongside Pierrot.

The third season, Book Three: Change, aired its first three episodes on June 27, 2014, soon after some episodes were leaked online. It takes place two weeks after the events of Book Two: Spirits. Episodes nine to thirteen were streamed online, rather than being broadcast as a television program.

Book Four: Balance, the final season, was produced in parallel to the previous two seasons. The crew, at one point, worked on approximately 30 episodes at the same time: post-production for season 2, production for season 3 and pre-production for season 4. Some production steps, such as color correction and retakes, continued up until the date of the series finale, December 19, 2014. Season 4 started online distribution a few months after the third season's finale on October 3, 2014. After Nickelodeon cut the season's budget by the amount required for one episode, DiMartino and Konietzko decided to include a clip show, which reuses previously produced animation, as episode 8 ("Remembrances") instead of dismissing many of the creative staff. Studio Mir was helped by its companion studio, a subunit called Studio Reve, while working on Book 4.

Concerning the development of the much-discussed final scene intended to show the friends Korra and Asami becoming a romantic couple, Bryan Konietzko explained that at first he and DiMartino did not give the idea much weight, assuming they would not be able to get approval for portraying their relationship. But during the production of the finale they decided to test that assumption, approached the network and found them supportive up to a certain limit. They decided to change the final scene from Korra and Asami only holding hands, to also facing each other in a pose referencing the marriage scene a few minutes prior and the pose made by Aang and Katara in the finale of Avatar: The Last Airbender.

=== Animation style ===
The Legend of Korra was produced mainly as traditional animation, with most frames drawn on paper in South Korea by the animators at Studio Mir and scanned for digital processing. Each episode comprises about 15,000 drawings. The series makes occasional use of computer-generated imagery for complex scenes or objects, most noticeably in the animations of the pro-bending arena or the mecha-suits of the later seasons.

While The Legend of Korra was produced in the United States and therefore not a work of Japanese animation ("anime") in the strict sense, The Escapist magazine argued that the series is so strongly influenced by anime that it would otherwise easily be classified as such: its protagonists (a superpowered heroine, her group of talented, supporting friends, a near-impervious villain who wants to reshape the world), its themes (family, friendship, romance, fear, and death) and the quality of its voice acting as well as the visual style are similar to those of leading anime series such as Fullmetal Alchemist: Brotherhood, Bleach or Trigun. A notable difference from such series is the absence of lengthy opening and ending sequences set to J-pop songs; to save broadcast time, The Legend of Korra's openings and endings last only a few seconds. The series mostly abstains from using the visual tropes characteristic of anime, but does occasionally use exaggerated facial expressions to highlight emotions for comic or dramatic effect.

As in Avatar, the series adds to its Asian aesthetic by presenting all text that appears in its fictional world in traditional Chinese characters, without translating it. For example, on the "Wanted" posters seen in the episode "The Stakeout", the names of the protagonists are written as 寇拉 (Korra), 馬高 (Mako) and 愽林 (Bolin).

=== Music ===
The Legend of Korra is set to music by Jeremy Zuckerman, who previously wrote the music for Avatar: The Last Airbender with Benjamin Wynn. For The Legend of Korra, Zuckerman is the sole composer while Wynn is the lead sound designer; the two collaborate with Foley artist Aran Tanchum and showrunner Mike DiMartino on the soundscape of the series. Konietzko and DiMartino's concept for the score was to blend traditional Chinese music with early jazz. On that basis, Zuckerman composed a score combining elements of Dixieland, traditional Chinese music and Western orchestration. It is performed mainly by a string sextet and various Chinese solo instruments, including a dizi (flute), paigu (drums), a guqin, an erhu and a Mongolian matouqin.

A soundtrack CD, The Legend of Korra: Original Music from Book One, was published on July 16, 2013. Music from Korra and Avatar was also played in concert at the PlayFest festival in Málaga, Spain in September 2014. The series' soundtrack was nominated as best TV soundtrack for the 2013 GoldSpirit Awards.

== Soundtrack ==
On July 16, 2013, Nickelodeon and Sony Music Entertainment's Legacy Recordings released The Legend of Korra: Original Music from Book One.

The Legend of Korra: Original Music from Book One
No.	Title	Length
1.	"Prologue"	1:18
2.	"Air Tight"	2:54
3.	"In a Box"	1:37
4.	"An Impossible Crime"	2:11
5.	"Being Patient / Beifong’s Sacrifice"	4:20
6.	"Asami and Mako Dine"	1:10
7.	"On the Lam"	1:19
8.	"Hittin’ on All Sixes"	2:40
9.	"Good Ol’ Days"	1:41
10.	"Before"	7:38
11.	"Fresh Air"	1:06
12.	"Korra Confronts Tarrlok"	3:00
13.	"Squeaky Rags"	1:44
14.	"Amon"	3:02
15.	"Chi Blockers"	2:18
16.	"A Peaceful Place"	2:03
17.	"Left My Heart in Republic City"	2:40
18.	"Firebending Training"	1:16
19.	"Wheels"	2:48
20.	"Republic City Under Attack"	4:03
21.	"Hardboiled…Afraid (Separate Ways)"	1:20
22.	"War"	2:04
23.	"Asami and Hiroshi / Korra Airbends"	4:24
24.	"Greatest Change"	5:16
25.	"The Legend of Korra End Credits"	0:31
26.	"The Legend of Korra Main Title"	0:28

== Release ==
=== Broadcast ===
==== United States ====
The first season (Book One: Air) aired in the United States on Nickelodeon on Saturday mornings between April 14, 2012, and June 23, 2012. Unlike its predecessor, the series was broadcast in high-definition. It was broadcast in other countries on the local Nickelodeon channels beginning in August 2012.

The second season (Book Two: Spirits) began airing on Nickelodeon in the United States on September 13, 2013, on Friday evenings. The season ended on November 22, 2013.

The third season (Book Three: Change) began airing on Nickelodeon in the United States on June 27, 2014, also on Friday evenings, two episodes at a time. The broadcast was announced one week in advance after several episodes of the new season were leaked on the Internet. After the first seven episodes aired to low ratings, Nickelodeon removed the last five episodes from its broadcast schedule. The remainder of the episodes were then distributed online via Amazon Video, Google Play, Xbox Video and Hulu as well as the Nickelodeon site and apps. The Escapist compared The Legend of Korra to Firefly as "a Friday night genre series with a loyal fan following built up from previous works by the creators that is taken off the air after the network fails to advertise it properly or broadcast episodes in a logical manner." Series creator Michael DiMartino said that the series' move to online distribution reflected a "sea change" in the industry: While Korra did not fit in well with Nickelodeon's other programming, the series did extremely well online, with the season 2 finale having been Nickelodeon's biggest online event.

The fourth season (Book Four: Balance) began distribution in the United States on October 3, 2014, through Nick.com, Amazon Video, iTunes and Hulu. Beginning on November 28, 2014, with episode 9, the fourth season was officially premiered back on television on Fridays on Nicktoons.

==== Worldwide ====
The Legend of Korra is broadcast subtitled or dubbed on Nickelodeon channels outside of the U.S.

In Germany, the first and second seasons received a German-language broadcast on Nickelodeon Germany. The third and fourth seasons are broadcast in 2015 on the German Nicktoons pay TV channel. In France, only the first season has been broadcast on Nickelodeon France and J-One. A fandub project to complete the French dub was launched in 2015.

In 2017, the Kenya Film Classification Board banned The Legend of Korra, together with the cartoon series The Loud House, Hey Arnold!, Steven Universe, Clarence and Adventure Time, from being broadcast in Kenya. According to the Board, the reason was that these series were "glorifying homosexual behavior".

=== Streaming and home media ===
The Legend of Korra got added to Netflix for streaming on August 14, 2020 in the United States. The Legend of Korra was removed from Netflix on April 16, 2025 in the United States.

All episodes of the series have also been released through digital download services, DVD and Blu-ray formats. The DVD releases contain extra features such as audio commentary from the creators, cast and crew for some episodes, and the Blu-ray releases contain commentary for additional episodes.

The following table indicates the release dates of the DVD and Blu-ray versions of the series:

Season		Episodes	DVD and Blu-ray release dates		
Season		Episodes	Region 1	Region 2	Region 4
1	Air	12	July 9, 2013	October 28, 2013	September 4, 2013
2	Spirits	14	July 1, 2014	October 20, 2014	August 20, 2014
3	Change	13	December 2, 2014	April 27, 2015	December 17, 2014
4	Balance	13	March 10, 2015	November 16, 2015	August 5, 2015
The Complete Series		52	December 13, 2016	February 15, 2017	March 12, 2017

== Reception ==
=== Ratings ===
The series premiere averaged 4.5 million viewers, ranking it as basic cable's number-one kids' show and top animated program for the week with total viewers. The Legend of Korra also ranks as the network's most-watched animated series premiere in three years.

Book One: Air drew an average of 3.8 million viewers per episode. This was the highest audience total for an animated series in the United States in 2012.

Book Two: Spirits premiered with 2.6 million viewers. Some sources attribute the reduced number of broadcast viewers to: the long period between seasons, a change in time slot (Friday evening instead of Saturday morning), the increased availability of digital download services, and generally reduced ratings for the Nickelodeon channel.

Book Three: Change aired on short notice in June 2014 after Spanish-language versions of some episodes were leaked on the Internet. The season premiered with 1.5 million viewers. After declining TV ratings in the third season, Nickelodeon stopped airing the series on its main network and shifted its distribution to sister channel, Nicktoons and online outlets. According to DiMartino, the series performed much better through online distribution.

The Legend of Korra : U.S. viewers per episode (millions)

Season	Episode number													
Season	1	2	3	4	5	6	7	8	9	10	11	12	13	14
1	4.55	4.55	3.55	4.08	3.78	3.88	3.45	2.98	3.58	3.54	3.68	3.68	–	
2	2.60	2.60	2.19	2.38	1.10	1.95	1.73	1.73	2.47	2.22	1.87	1.87	2.09	2.09
3	1.50	1.50	1.29	1.19	1.18	1.28	1.33	1.08	–					

Audience measurement performed by Nielsen Media Research

=== Critical response ===
On the review aggregator website Rotten Tomatoes, the show currently has an average score of 88%, based on critic reviews. Its first season holds a score of 91% with an average rating of 8.25 out of 10, based on 11 critic reviews, with the website's critical consensus saying, "The Legend of Korra expands the world of Avatar: The Last Airbender with narrative substance and crisp animation – and progresses the drama and action with a female lead." The second season holds a score of 64% based on 11 critic reviews. Both Book Three: Change and Book 4: Balance receive the score of 100% based on 9 critic reviews, with average ratings of 9.5 out of 10 and 9 out of 10 respectively.

==== Style and production values ====
David Hinckley of the New York Daily News wrote that the "visually striking" series is "full of little tricks and nuances that only true fans will notice and savor, but nothing prevents civilians from enjoying it as well." Writing for Vulture, Matt Patches highlighted the second season's loose, handheld-style cinematography—challenging for an animated series—and the "weird, wonderful", wildly imagined spirits fought by Korra; "a Kaiju parade with beasts that mirror velociraptors". The A.V. Club was more critical of portions of Book Two, however, finding its facial animation less expressive and its direction more static than in Book One. Max Nicholson for IGN described the third season as "easily the show's most consistent season to date, delivering complex themes, excellent storylines and unmatched production values." And Oliver Sava, for The A.V. Club, characterized it as a "truly magnificent season of television, delivering loads of character development, world building, socio-political commentary, and heart-racing action, all presented with beautifully smooth animation and impeccable voice acting".

==== Writing and themes ====
Before the first season's finale, Scott Thill of Wired hailed The Legend of Korra as "the smartest cartoon on TV," able to address adults' spiritual and sociopolitical concerns while presenting an "alternately riveting and hilarious ride packed with fantasy naturalism, steampunk grandeur, kinetic conflicts, sci-fi weaponry and self-aware comedy." In The Atlantic, Julie Beck characterized the series as "some of the highest quality fantasy of our time", appreciating it for combining nuanced social commentary with Avatar: The Last Airbender's "warmth, whimsy, and self-referential wit". Brian Lowry of Variety felt that the series "represents a bit more ambitious storytelling for older kids, and perhaps a few adults with the geek gene."

Reviewers also criticized aspects of the first season's writing. Kirk Hamilton of Kotaku argued that the series did not meaningfully examine its central conflict between benders and non-benders and that its narrative arcs were compressed into too little time. Max Nicholson of IGN found the Korra–Mako–Asami love triangle ineffective and Mako underwritten, while Lauren Davis of io9 criticized the pacing of the final episodes.

At TV.com, Noel Kirkpatrick commented favorably on how the second season of "one of television's best programs" handled the necessary quantity of exposition, and on its introduction of the theme of conflict between spiritualism and secularism. Emily Guendelsberger of The A.V. Club was more critical of Book Two's finale, finding parts of its mythology unclear and its climactic action repetitive despite praising its visual execution. Covering the third season, Scott Thill at Salon described Korra as one of the toughest, most complex female characters on TV, despite being in a cartoon, and considered that the "surreal, lovely sequel" to Avatar "lastingly and accessibly critiques power, gender, extinction, spirit and more — all wrapped up in a kinetic 'toon as lyrical and expansive as anything dreamt up by Hayao Miyazaki or George Lucas". David Levesley at The Daily Beast recommended the series to those looking for "beautifully shot and well-written fantasy on television" after the end of Game of Thrones's most recent season, noting that in both series "the fantastical and the outlandish are carefully balanced with human relationships and political intrigue".

Several reviewers noted the sociopolitical issues that, unusually for an animated series on a children's channel, run through The Legend of Korra. According to Forbes, by telling "some of the darkest, most mature stories" ever animated, The Legend of Korra has created a new genre, "the world's first animated television drama". Priyanka Bose of The A.V. Club, however, argued that the series' 12- to 14-episode seasons moved at a rapid pace that left little time to explore its political and social issues in depth. Thill proposed that the Equalists' cause in season 1 reflected the recent appearance of the Occupy movement, and DiMartino responded that though the series was written before Occupy Wall Street began, he agreed that the show similarly depicted "a large group of people who felt powerless up against a relatively small group of people in power." Beck wrote that The Legend of Korra used magic to illustrate "the growing pains of a modernizing world seeing the rise of technology and capitalism, and taking halting, jerky steps toward self-governance", while portraying no side of the conflict as entirely flawless. Alyssa Rosenberg praised the show for examining issues of class in an urban setting, and a guest post in her column argued that the struggle between Korra and Amon's Equalists reflected some of the ideas of John Rawls' "luck egalitarianism", praising the series for tackling moral issues of inequality and redistribution. Hamilton was less positive about the Equalist storyline, arguing that Amon's development into a more conventional villain and the revelation that he was himself a bender undermined the season's initial conflict over inequality between benders and non-benders.

Writing for The Escapist, Mike Hoffman noted how the series respected its younger viewers by explicitly showing, but also giving emotional weight to the death of major characters, including "one of the most brutal and sudden deaths in children's television" in the case of P'Li in season 3. By portraying Korra's opponents not as stereotypical villains, but as human beings with understandable motivations corrupted by an excess of zeal, the series trusted in viewers to be able to "resolve the dissonance between understanding someone's view and disagreeing with their methods". And, Hoffman wrote, by showing Korra to suffer from "full-on depression" at the end of the third season, and devoting much of the fourth to her recovery, the series helped normalize mental health issues, a theme generally unaddressed in children's television, which made them less oppressive for the viewers.

==== Gender, race and sexual orientation ====
The series' final shot, intended to show Asami and Korra becoming a romantic couple, was seen as pushing the boundaries of LGBTQ representation in children's TV.

Summing up Book Four, Joanna Robinson for Vanity Fair described it as "the most subversive television event of the year", noting how much of the season and series pushed the boundaries of what is nominally children's television by "breaking racial, sexual, and political ground": It featured a dark-skinned female lead character as well as a bevy of diverse female characters of all ages, focused on challenging issues such as weapons of mass destruction, PTSD and fascism, and was infused with an Eastern spirituality based on tenets such as balance and mindfulness. Levesley also highlighted the "many examples of well-written women, predominantly of color" in the series. Oliver Sava at The A.V. Club noted that the series had "consistently delivered captivating female figures"; he considered it to be first and foremost about women, and about how they relate to each other "as friends, family, and rivals in romance and politics".

Moreover, according to Robinson, the series' final scene, in which Korra and Asami gaze into each other's eyes in a shot mirroring the composition of Avatar's final moments in which Aang and Katara kiss, "changed the face of TV" by going further than any other work of children's television in depicting same-sex relationships—an assessment shared by reviewers for TV.com, The A.V. Club, USA Today, IGN, Moviepilot and The Advocate. Mike Hoffman, on the other hand, felt that Korra and Asami's relationship was not intended as particularly subversive, but as something the writers trusted younger viewers, now often familiar with same-sex relationships, to be mature enough to understand. Eric Thurm of Complex, however, noted criticism that Korra and Asami's relationship had received insufficient groundwork and questioned whether the ambiguity of the ending constituted enough progress in queer representation. Megan Farokhmanesh of Polygon wrote that by portraying Korra and Asami as bisexual, the series even avoided the error of assuming sexual orientation, as many other TV series did, to be a strict divide between "gay" and "straight". In 2018, io9 ranked the series' final scene #55 on its list of "The 100 Most Important Pop Culture Moments of the Last 10 Years". As Korra was made widely available again on Netflix in 2020, Janet Varney called her role as the voice of Korra "the most profound and meaningful part of my career" on account of the impact the ending had on queer fans. Vanity Fair said that the show's creators "fought hard" for the ending with Korra and Asami, which has "plausible deniability that it's all platonic."

The Washington Post and Vulture have since credited The Legend of Korra with changing the landscape of LGBT representation in western animated children's cartoons, paving the way for more overt queer content in shows such as Adventure Time, Steven Universe, and She-Ra and the Princesses of Power.

=== Accolades ===
The first season of The Legend of Korra received several awards and nominations. It received two nominations for the 2012 Annie Awards; Bryan Konietzko, Joaquim Dos Santos Ryu Ki-Hyun, Kim Il Kwang and Kim Jin Sun were nominated in the category of Best Character Design in an Animated Television Production, and the first two episodes were nominated in the category of Best Animated Television Production for Children. The series was also nominated for the "Outstanding Children's Program" award from among the 2012 NAACP Image Awards, which "celebrates the accomplishments of people of color". IGN editors and readers awarded the series the "IGN People's Choice Award" and the "Best TV Animated Series" award in 2012, and it was also nominated for "Best TV Series" and "Best TV Hero" for Korra. The series also took second place (after My Little Pony: Friendship is Magic) in a TV.com readers' poll for the "Best Animated Series" of 2012. The first season also received three Daytime Emmy Award nominations, winning in the category of "Outstanding Casting For an Animated Series or Special."

The second season received fewer awards and total nominations than the first; it was nominated for three Annie Awards in 2014, winning in the category of "Outstanding Achievement, Production Design in an Animated TV/Broadcast Production." It was nominated for two more IGN awards, being nominated for "Best TV Animated Series" and winning the "IGN People's Choice Award" for the second year in a row.

The third and fourth seasons, combined into one entry, were nominated for six IGN awards, winning the "People's Choice Award" for the third time in a row, as well as "Best TV Animated Series" for the second time, "People's Choice Award for Best TV Episode" for Korra Alone, and "People's Choice Award for Best TV Series" for the first time. The third and fourth seasons were nominated for two Annie Awards; "Best Animated TV/Broadcast Production for Children's Audience," and winning "Outstanding Achievement, Storyboarding in an Animated TV/Broadcast Production."

Awards
Book	Year	Award	Category	Name	Outcome
Book 1	2012	IGN's Best of 2012 Awards	Best TV Series	The Legend of Korra	Nominated
Book 1	2012	IGN's Best of 2012 Awards	Best TV Animated Series	The Legend of Korra	Won
Book 1	2012	IGN's Best of 2012 Awards	IGN People's Choice Award for Best TV Animated Series	The Legend of Korra	Won
Book 1	2012	IGN's Best of 2012 Awards	Best TV Hero	Janet Varney (Korra)	Nominated
Book 1	2013	Annie Awards	Best Animated Television Production for Children	The Legend of Korra	Nominated
Book 1	2013	Annie Awards	Best Character Design in an Animated Television Production	Bryan Konietzko, Joaquim Dos Santos, Ryu Ki-Hyun, Kim Il Kwang and Kim Jin Sun	Nominated
Book 1	2013	2nd Annual BTVA Awards	Best Vocal Ensemble in a New Television Series	The Legend of Korra	Won
Book 1	2013	2nd Annual BTVA Awards	BTVA People's Choice Award for Best Vocal Ensemble in a New Television Series	The Legend of Korra	Won
Book 1	2013	2nd Annual BTVA Awards	Best Female Lead Vocal Performance in a Television Series — Action/Drama	Janet Varney (Korra)	Won
Book 1	2013	2nd Annual BTVA Awards	Best Female Vocal Performance in a Television Series in a Guest Role	Eva Marie Saint (Katara)	Won
Book 1	2013	2nd Annual BTVA Awards	Best Male Lead Vocal Performance in a Television Series — Action/Drama	JK Simmons (Tenzin)	Nominated
Book 1	2013	2nd Annual BTVA Awards	BTVA People's Choice Award for Best Male Vocal Performance in a Television Series in a Supporting Role — Action/Drama	Steve Blum (Amon)	Won
Book 1	2013	2nd Annual BTVA Awards	Best Male Vocal Performance in a Television Series in a Supporting Role — Action/Drama	Dee Bradley Baker (Tarrlok)	Nominated
Book 1	2013	2nd Annual BTVA Awards	Best Female Vocal Performance in a Television Series in a Supporting Role — Action/Drama	Mindy Sterling (Lin Beifong)	Nominated
Book 1	2013	Daytime Emmy Awards	Outstanding Special Class Animated Program	Joaquim Dos Santos, Tim Yoon, Ki Hyun Ryu, Michael Dante DiMartino and Bryan Konietzko	Nominated
Book 1	2013	Daytime Emmy Awards	Outstanding Directing In An Animated Program	Joaquim Dos Santos, Ki-Hyun Ryu, Andrea Romano	Nominated
Book 1	2013	Daytime Emmy Awards	Outstanding Casting For An Animated Series Or Special	Shannon Reed, Sarah Noonan, Gene Vassilaros	Won
Book 1	2013	NAACP Image Awards	Outstanding Children's Program	The Legend of Korra	Nominated
Book 1	2013	Young Artist Awards	Best Performance in a Voice-Over Role (Television) – Young Actress	Kiernan Shipka (Jinora)	Nominated
Book 2	2014	Annie Awards	Best Animated TV/Broadcast Production for Children's Audience	The Legend of Korra	Nominated
Book 2	2014	Annie Awards	Outstanding Achievement, Directing in an Animated TV/Broadcast Production	Colin Heck	Nominated
Book 2	2014	Annie Awards	Outstanding Achievement, Production Design in an Animated TV/Broadcast Production	Angela Sung, William Niu, Christine Bian, Emily Tetri, Frederic Stewart	Won
Book 2	2014	IGN's Best of 2013 Awards	Best TV Animated Series	The Legend of Korra	Nominated
Book 2	2014	IGN's Best of 2013 Awards	IGN People's Choice Award for Best TV Animated Series	The Legend of Korra	Won
Book 2	2014	3rd Annual BTVA Awards	BTVA People's Choice Award for Best Vocal Ensemble in a Television Series — Action/Drama	The Legend of Korra	Won
Book 2	2014	3rd Annual BTVA Awards	BTVA People's Choice Award for Best Female Lead Vocal Performance in a Television Series — Action/Drama	Janet Varney (Korra)	Won
Book 2	2014	3rd Annual BTVA Awards	Best Female Vocal Performance in a Television Series in a Guest Role	April Stewart (Raava)	Won
Book 2	2014	3rd Annual BTVA Awards	BTVA People's Choice Award for Best Female Vocal Performance in a Television Series in a Guest Role	April Stewart (Raava)	Won
Book 2	2014	3rd Annual BTVA Awards	BTVA People's Choice Award for Best Male Vocal Performance in a Television Series in a Supporting Role — Action/Drama	John Michael Higgins (Varrick)	Won
Book 2	2014	3rd Annual BTVA Awards	BTVA People's Choice Award for Best Male Vocal Performance in a Television Series in a Guest Role	Jason Marsden (Aye-Aye)	Won
Book 3 & Book 4	2015	IGN's Best of 2014 Awards	Best TV Series	The Legend of Korra	Nominated
Book 3 & Book 4	2015	IGN's Best of 2014 Awards	IGN People's Choice Award for Best TV Series	The Legend of Korra	Won
Book 3 & Book 4	2015	IGN's Best of 2014 Awards	Best TV Animated Series	The Legend of Korra	Won
Book 3 & Book 4	2015	IGN's Best of 2014 Awards	IGN People's Choice Award for Best TV Animated Series	The Legend of Korra	Won
Book 3 & Book 4	2015	IGN's Best of 2014 Awards	Best TV Episode	"Korra Alone"	Nominated
Book 3 & Book 4	2015	IGN's Best of 2014 Awards	IGN People's Choice Award for Best TV Episode	"Korra Alone"	Won
Book 3 & Book 4	2015	Annie Awards	Best Animated TV/Broadcast Production for Children's Audience	The Legend of Korra	Nominated
Book 3 & Book 4	2015	Annie Awards	Outstanding Achievement, Storyboarding in an Animated TV/Broadcast Production	Joaquim Dos Santos for "Venom of the Red Lotus"	Won
Book 3 & Book 4	2015	Daytime Emmy Awards	Outstanding Casting For An Animated Series Or Special	Shannon Reed, Sarah Noonan, Gene Vassilaros	Nominated
Book 3 & Book 4	2015	Daytime Emmy Awards	Outstanding Sound Mixing — Animation	Justin Brinsfield, Matt Corey, Manny Grijalva, Adrian Ordonez, Aran Tanchum	Nominated
Book 3 & Book 4	2015	Gracie Allen Awards	Outstanding Animated Programming — Production	The Legend of Korra	Won
Book 3 & Book 4	2015	4th Annual BTVA Awards	BTVA People's Choice Award for Best Vocal Ensemble in a Television Series — Action/Drama	The Legend of Korra	Won
Book 3 & Book 4	2015	4th Annual BTVA Awards	BTVA People's Choice Award for Best Male Lead Vocal Performance in a Television Series — Action/Drama	PJ Byrne (Bolin)	Won
Book 3 & Book 4	2015	4th Annual BTVA Awards	Best Female Lead Vocal Performance in a Television Series — Action/Drama	Janet Varney (Korra)	Won
Book 3 & Book 4	2015	4th Annual BTVA Awards	BTVA People's Choice Award for Best Female Lead Vocal Performance in a Television Series — Action/Drama	Janet Varney (Korra)	Won
Book 3 & Book 4	2015	4th Annual BTVA Awards	Best Female Lead Vocal Performance in a Television Series — Action/Drama	Seychelle Gabriel (Asami Sato)	Nominated
Book 3 & Book 4	2015	4th Annual BTVA Awards	BTVA People's Choice Award for Best Male Vocal Performance in a Television Series in a Supporting Role — Action/Drama	Henry Rollins (Zaheer)	Won
Book 3 & Book 4	2015	4th Annual BTVA Awards	Best Male Vocal Performance in a Television Series in a Supporting Role — Action/Drama	Maurice LaMarche (Aiwei)	Nominated
Book 3 & Book 4	2015	4th Annual BTVA Awards	BTVA People's Choice Award for Best Female Vocal Performance in a Television Series in a Supporting Role — Action/Drama	Philece Sampler (Toph Beifong)	Won
Book 3 & Book 4	2015	4th Annual BTVA Awards	Best Female Vocal Performance in a Television Series in a Supporting Role — Action/Drama	Zelda Williams (Kuvira)	Nominated
Book 3 & Book 4	2015	31st TCA Awards	Outstanding Achievement in Youth Programming	The Legend of Korra	Nominated

=== Fandom ===
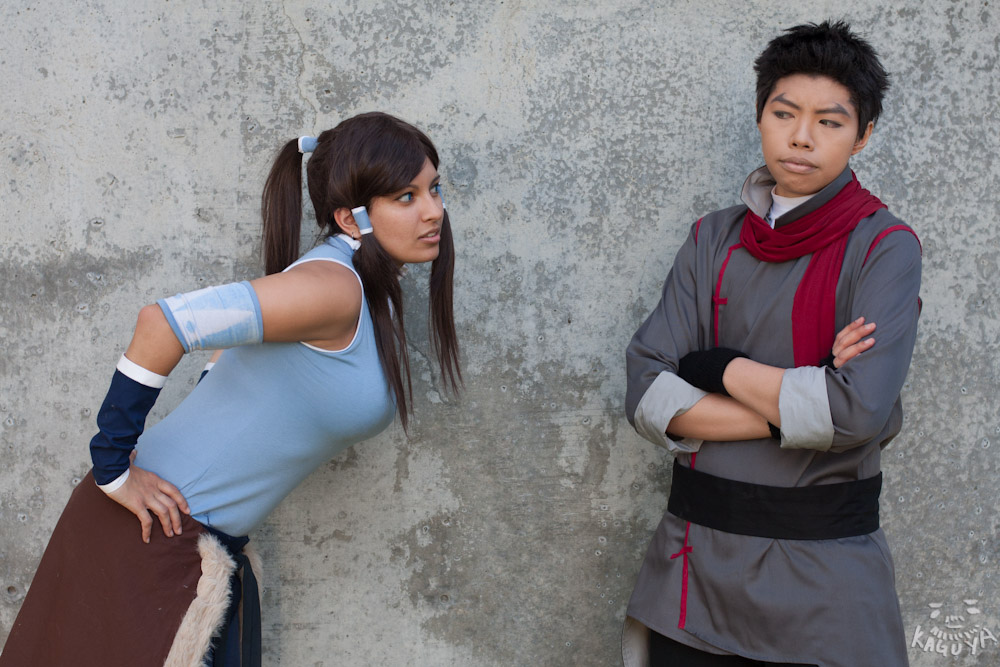
Two fans cosplaying as Korra and Mako in 2012

Like its predecessor series, The Legend of Korra has a broad fandom, including on social media and at fan conventions. Most fans are young adults, according to The Escapist, but many are children and younger teenagers.

According to Merrill Barr writing for Forbes, few series "boast as vocal a fan base as The Legend of Korra", including such popular series as Game of Thrones and Orphan Black. In January 2015, after the series ended, the media reported on a fan petition to have Netflix produce a series in the Avatar universe garnering more than 10,000 signatures only in 2015.

=== Influence ===
The A.V. Club and io9 noted that the live-action TV series Warrior, for which NBC ordered a pilot in early 2015, has a premise almost identical to that of The Legend of Korra: It is to be about "a damaged heroine" who "works undercover with physical and spiritual guidance from a mysterious martial arts master to bring down an international crime lord" in a "contemporary multicultural and sometimes magical milieu".

In an interview with GLAAD's Raina Deerwater, ND Stevenson, creator of the series She-Ra and the Princesses of Power talked about queer representation in animation, situating The Legend of Korra alongside Steven Universe as an inspiring series that has taught young fans to expect "nothing less than a variety of solid queer representation and central queer characters.".

== Other media ==
=== Comics ===
The Legend of Korra is continued in a graphic novel trilogy series written by DiMartino and published by Dark Horse Comics. The first trilogy, The Legend of Korra: Turf Wars, was drawn by Irene Koh and takes place immediately following the series finale, focusing on Korra and Asami's relationship in the aftermath of Kuvira's attack. The first volume was published on July 26, 2017, the second volume was published on January 17, 2018, and the third and final volume was published on August 22, 2018. A sequel, The Legend of Korra: Ruins of the Empire, was published in three volumes in May 2019, November 2019, and February 2020.

=== Art ===
Hardcover art books detailing each season's creative process have been published by Dark Horse, similar to the art book published about Avatar: The Last Airbender:

Title	Date	Authors	ISBN	Notes
The Legend of Korra Book 1: Air – The Art of the Animated Series	19 July 2013	Michael Dante DiMartino; Bryan Konietzko; Joaquim Dos Santos	ISBN 978-1-61655-168-1	
The Legend of Korra Book 2: Spirits – The Art of the Animated Series	16 September 2014	Michael Dante DiMartino; Bryan Konietzko; Joaquim Dos Santos	ISBN 978-1-61655-462-0	
The Legend of Korra Book 3: Change – The Art of the Animated Series	20 January 2015	Michael Dante DiMartino; Bryan Konietzko; Joaquim Dos Santos	ISBN 978-1-61655-565-8	
The Legend of Korra Book 4: Balance – The Art of the Animated Series	15 September 2015	Michael Dante DiMartino; Bryan Konietzko; Joaquim Dos Santos	ISBN 978-1-61655-687-7	

In July 2013, Nickelodeon published a free interactive e-book, The Legend of Korra: Enhanced Experience, on iTunes. It contained material such as concept art, character biographies, animatics and storyboards.

In March 2013, PixelDrip Gallery organized a Legend of Korra fan art exhibition in Los Angeles with the support of the series' creators, and later published a documentary video about it. Another art exhibition supported by Nickelodeon to pay tribute to The Legend of Korra and Avatar was held from March 7 to 22, 2015 at Gallery Nucleus in Alhambra, California.

An adult coloring book, The Legend of Korra Coloring Book (ISBN 978-1-5067-0246-9) with art by Jed Henry was released in July 2017.

=== Novels ===
Book One: Air was adapted as two novels by Erica David, aimed at readers ages twelve and up. The novelizations were published by Random House in 2013:

- David, Erica (January 8, 2013). Revolution (adapting episodes one to six). Random House. ISBN 978-0-449-81554-0.
- David, Erica (July 23, 2013). Endgame (adapting episodes seven to twelve). Random House. ISBN 978-0-449-81734-6.

=== Games ===
Activision published two video games based on the series in October 2014. The first, titled only The Legend of Korra, is a third-person beat 'em up game for Xbox One, Xbox 360, PlayStation 4, PlayStation 3, and Microsoft Windows. Despite the game's developer PlatinumGames being known for well-received action games, the game received mixed reviews. The second game, The Legend of Korra: A New Era Begins, is a turn-based strategy game developed by Webfoot Technologies for the Nintendo 3DS. Nickelodeon also makes several Adobe Flash-based browser games based on The Legend of Korra available on their website.

IDW Publishing released a series of board games based on The Legend of Korra. The first is an adaptation of the series' pro-bending game; that was financed through Kickstarter and released in fall 2017. Korra is a playable character in multiple Nickelodeon crossover games, including Super Brawl Universe, Nickelodeon Kart Racers 2: Grand Prix and 3: Slime Speedway, and Nickelodeon All-Star Brawl and its sequel. Korra also appears as a skin for Skadi in Smite.

=== Merchandise ===
A 12-inch figurine of Lin Beifong, as well as a graphic t-shirt, was announced at the 2015 San Diego Comic-Con. Mondo released a figurine of Korra and Asami holding hands in March 2018.

== Spin-offs and sequels ==
In August 2012, Variety reported that Paramount Animation, a sister company of Nickelodeon, was starting development of several animated films, with budgets of around US$100 million. According to Variety, a possible candidate for one of the films was The Legend of Korra. Series creator Bryan Konietzko later wrote on his blog that no such film was in development. In July 2013, he said that he and DiMartino were far too busy working on multiple seasons of the TV series in parallel to consider developing a film adaptation at that time.

In 2013, before the premiere of Book Two: Spirits, Nickelodeon released three animated short videos online titled Republic City Hustle that cover part of the lives of Mako and Bolin as street hustlers before the events of the first season. They are written by Tim Hedrick, one of the writers for Book Two: Spirits, and designed by Evon Freeman.

On February 20, 2025, Nickelodeon and Avatar Studios announced Avatar: Seven Havens, an animated series taking place 225 years after the end of The Legend of Korra. The series' protagonists are Pavi and Nisha twin sisters from Ellora who are the next incarnations of the Avatar after Korra's death. It premiered on October 9, 2026, and is planned to run for four seasons.
