= Kuvira =

Fictional character from The Legend of Korra

- Avatar Legends character
- Kuvira in The Legend of Korra.
- First appearance: "The Metal Clan" (2014)
- Last appearance: "Ruins of the Empire Part Three" (2020)
- Created by: Michael Dante DiMartino; Bryan Konietzko
- Voiced by: Zelda Williams

In-universe information
- Gender: Female
- Title: Great Uniter
- Occupation: De facto leader of the Earth Kingdom/Earth Empire; Dancer; Captain of the Zaofu Guard
- Family: Suyin Beifong (mentor/foster mother); Baatar (foster father)
- Spouses: Baatar Jr. (ex-fiancé/foster brother)
- Relatives: Huan (foster brother); Opal (foster sister); Wei (foster brother); Wing (foster brother)
- Nationality: Earth Kingdom/Earth Empire
- Bending element: Primary: Earthbending; Sub-styles: Metalbending
- Hair color: Black
- Eye color: Green

Kuvira (古維拉; Gǔ Wéilā), also known as The Great Uniter, is a fictional character in the Nickelodeon animated television series The Legend of Korra, the sequel to Avatar: The Last Airbender, created by Michael Dante DiMartino and Bryan Konietzko. She is part of the Avatar: The Last Airbender world. Introduced in a minor capacity in the third season of the series, she becomes the main antagonist of the fourth season, and returns in the Ruins of the Empire comic book trilogy. Kuvira was created with similar characteristics to the portrayal of protagonist Korra in prior seasons to highlight the changes she had made over the course of the series. Kuvira's character has been mostly met with positive reception. Critics note her motives as being understandable, while her actions are given political analogues.

== Appearances ==
=== The Legend of Korra (2014) ===
==== Book 3: Change ====
Kuvira was abandoned by her birth parents and taken in by Suyin Beifong when she was eight years old, raised as a daughter but kept apart from Beifong's own biological children. Beifong nurtured her talents and they developed a close relationship, Kuvira picked up Suyin's progressive ideology of modernization and self-fulfillment. Kuvira gradually rose through the ranks of Zaofu's security team and became captain of the city's guard, also being a part of Suyin's dance troupe, and becoming engaged to Suyin's biological son and her own adoptive brother, Baatar Jr. Kuvira makes sporadic appearances throughout the third season of the series, although she is never referred to by name until the season's penultimate episode. She attacked Zaheer while he was attempting to kidnap Korra, being joined by other members of the Metal Clan in trapping him and his associates before they left Korra and escaped, Kuvira afterward unsuccessfully searching the city for them. After being questioned by Aiwei and he being revealed to be in cahoots with Zaheer, Kuvira searched for him under direction from Lin Beifong. After the Red Lotus took the airbenders captive at Northern Air Temple, Kuvira traveled there in an attempt to free them. Being double-crossed into letting Avatar Korra be taken captive by Zaheer in exchange for the airbenders' being freed, Kuvira was attacked by P'Li and saved Korra's father Tonraq, tending to his injuries as well.

==== Book 4: Balance ====
In the fourth season, set three years later, Kuvira has since been tasked with restoring order to the land following the chaos brought about by the Earth Queen's death, following Suyin's refusal to do so. While she genuinely wishes to help her people, Kuvira is shown or implied to have committed a number of tyrannical actions for the sake of her goal: she refuses to help impoverished states unless they provide her with large amounts of natural resources by signing over control of the region to her, uses her citizens for labor, imprisons dissenters in re-education camps and conscripts people into her armed forces. She later seizes power for herself, on the basis that the Earth Kingdom's monarchy led to the previous decline of the Earth Kingdom, and has the nation rechristened as the Earth Empire. Following the coronation of Prince Wu, at which Kuvira announces her intentions to rule the nation herself, Kuvira moves to take control of Zaofu, intending to use the city state's wealth and technology for the sake of her empire. At the same time, she attempts to have Varrick develop weapons powered with spirit vine energy. These actions, along with Kuvira's refusal to tolerate disagreement with her, lead to Bolin and Varrick defecting from her side. While laying siege to Zaofu after negotiations with Suyin fail, Kuvira meets up with Korra, who attempts to convince her to leave Zaofu in peace. Kuvira refuses, asking why she should treat Zaofu any different than her other states, and instead persuades Korra to try and convince Suyin to surrender, pointing out that both women (Korra and Kuvira) have had to make unpopular decisions in the past.

That night, Suyin and her sons Wei and Wing unsuccessfully attempt to capture Kuvira, who subsequently demands Zaofu's unconditional surrender. Korra refuses to hand over the city-state, and the two women agree to fight for the sake of Zaofu, with the winner agreeing to submit to the loser's whims. While Kuvira initially has the advantage due to Korra having been out of practice for three years following her poisoning, Kuvira is immediately overwhelmed after Korra taps into the Avatar State and is nearly killed, only surviving when Korra has a PTSD-influenced hallucination due to being poisoned in the previous season that forces her out of the Avatar State, allowing Kuvira the opportunity to kill her, only to be stopped by Jinora and Opal Beifong. Kuvira tries to have her army capture the trio, but they are foiled by the appearance of Meelo and Ikki, Jinora's siblings. Korra and the airbenders escape, while Kuvira takes control of Zaofu, imprisoning the rest of the Beifong family when they refuse to kneel before her. Later on, Kuvira attempts to have Wu, who has been residing in Republic City following the coronation, kidnapped and brought to her, for the implied purpose of executing him. The attempt is foiled by Korra, Asami Sato, and Mako. She also has her army start harvesting the spirit vines in the Foggy Swamp, with Baatar Jr. taking over the spirit vine weapon project following Varrick's escape. This ultimately bears fruit in the form of a large cannon that fires destructive beams of spiritual energy. Attempting to carry out a demonstration of the cannon's power, Kuvira discovers that Zhu Li, who had returned to her side following Varrick's initial attempt to defect, has been sabotaging the weapon to prevent its completion. At the same time as the demonstration, Bolin, Opal, Lin Beifong and Toph rescue the rest of the Beifong family, and later save Zhu Li, returning to Republic City.

With the escape of her prisoners and the completion of her weapon, Kuvira intends to conquer the United Republic, believing the land to have been stolen from the Earth Kingdom by Aang and Zuko following the Hundred Year War. To this end she travels to Republic City in a gigantic mech suit known as The Colossus, which has the spirit vine weapon mounted on one arm, in order to force the United Republic to surrender. In response, Korra and her allies kidnap Baatar Jr, with the Avatar threatening to forever keep the two apart from each other unless Kuvira leaves Republic City. Kuvira fires the weapon at the place where Baatar Jr is being held, intending to kill Korra and her friends. They all survive; Kuvira's actions lead Baatar Jr to defect against her as well. Korra and her allies decide to bring down The Colossus, and, in the ensuing battle, the mecha is destroyed and Kuvira is injured. Refusing to surrender, Kuvira flees into the spirit wilds and finds the spirit vine weapon, which had been thrown there during the battle. She fires the still functional cannon at Korra, but the weapon starts drawing on the energy in the nearby spirit vines and goes out of control, throwing Kuvira off. Just before the weapon's beam can hit her, Korra saves her by using energy bending to stop the beam, inadvertently creating a new spirit portal.

Both Kuvira and Korra are blasted into the spirit world by the weapon. When Kuvira asks why Korra saved her life after everything that happened, the Avatar explains that she sees a lot of herself in Kuvira; both are fierce and determined to succeed, and sometimes don't think about the consequences of their actions. As Korra calls Kuvira out for her actions, Kuvira explains that after being abandoned by her parents, she could not bear to allow the same thing to happen to the Earth Kingdom. Sympathizing with Kuvira, Korra relates Kuvira's desire for control to her own following her poisoning and subsequent recovery. The two women then return to the physical world, with Kuvira agreeing to surrender, out of both gratitude to Korra and acknowledgment of the Avatar's power. As she is led away by Lin and Suyin, she apologizes to the latter for her previous actions.

=== The Legend of Korra: Ruins of the Empire (2019–2020) ===
In The Legend of Korra: Ruins of the Empire, set three months after Kuvira's defeat and the dissolution of the Earth Empire, after pleading not guilty to her charges, Kuvira learns from Korra that her former subordinate Commander Guan never surrendered his forces and apparently plans to disrupt the upcoming democratic elections of state governors as part of King Wu's efforts to reform the Earth Kingdom. To prevent this, Kuvira convinces Korra to allow her to travel with her to Gaoling to try and talk Guan down. However, after Guan refuses Kuvira's request to surrender and refuses to fight her, Kuvira assaults Guan before she is electrocuted into unconsciousness by Asami, who resents Kuvira for killing her father. Later, after Korra and Wu leave to convince Toph Beifong to stand as a candidate for governor after learning Guan plans to partake in the election himself, having Earth Empire members do the same in other states in order to effectively restore the Earth Empire, Guan launches an attack on Korra's docked airship, capturing Kuvira alongside Asami, Mako, and Bolin. After witnessing Guan brainwash everyone but her into serving him with the same machine he plans to use to rig the elections, Kuvira manages to escape, contacting Suyin, informing her of what had happened and convincing her to help.

The following day, after Suyin arrives, Kuvira tries to persuade Korra to flee to Zaofu and gather reinforcements, as well as devise a way to break the brainwashing, but Korra instead convinces Kuvira to join her in attempting to rescue her friends. After battling Guan's forces and rescuing Asami at the cost of losing King Wu, Kuvira reveals that to break her brainwashing, she will need the help of her former fiancée Baatar Jr. Upon reuniting with Baatar Jr. and apologizing for her actions, an initially reluctant Baatar Jr. creates a device capable of reversing the brainwashing, with Kuvira serving as a willing test subject and risking damage to her mind to help him in this process, proving to him that she has in fact changed. Upon using this machine to break Asami's brainwashing, Kuvira learns that Guan has had Wu hold the election early, ensuring his victory, and that after learning of the situation, President Zhu Li Moon has ordered Kuvira's return to the United Republic on the basis of there being no more use for her. Overnight, Kuvira instead escapes to Gaoling, prompting Korra and her allies to go after her.

Kuvira meets with Guan and tricks him into taking her to his brainwashing laboratory, where she attempts to brainwash him into giving up his plans. She is attacked by the still brainwashed Mako and Bolin before she can do so, but Korra and her allies come to her rescue, allowing her to defeat Guan and cure his victims of their brainwashing. As thanks for Kuvira's role in stopping Guan, and because of her showing genuine remorse for her past crimes and changing her plea to guilty, Suyin arranges for her sentence to be commuted to house arrest in Zaofu with Baatar Jr., as they renew their relationship, assuring Kuvira that, even though she is not a Beifong by blood, she will always be part of the family, granting her use of the Beifong family name.

== Conception and creation ==
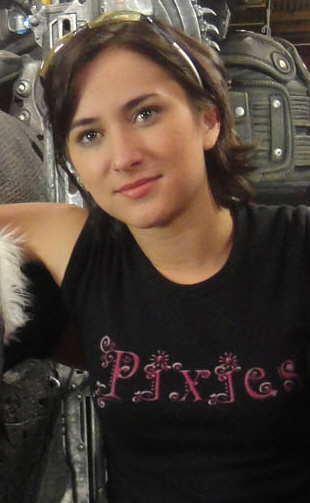
Zelda Williams voices Kuvira

For the main antagonist of the fourth season of The Legend of Korra, DiMartino and Konietzko wanted a female antagonist since the previous three (Amon, Unalaq and Zaheer) were all male. They also wanted an earthbender to be the main antagonist for the final season; waterbending had already been done with Amon and Unalaq in Book One: Air and Book Two: Spirits respectively, airbending with Zaheer in Book Three: Change, and firebending with Ozai, Azula, and Zhao in the previous show Avatar: The Last Airbender. Konietzko additionally commented that he had longed to have a military dictator serve as an antagonist. Leading up to the premiere of the fourth season, Konietzko did not specify her background though acknowledged the possibilities relating to it, stating in a September 26, 2014 post, "We don't have any kind of confirmation on what Kuvira's backstory is, other than what Suyin has told us, but there are a lot of really cool theories."

For her redesign for the fourth season, Kuvira initially had a long braid that extended to her legs and an asymmetrical cape, a design that Konietzko favored, though it was abandoned for contributing to difficulty in animating. There was discussion among the creative team on how to integrate Kuvira's armor into her combat, which they eventually settled by having thin strips of metal on her back. Kuvira's design, in particular her costume, became the basis for the rest of the Earth Kingdom characters to be modeled after during production. Kuvira was purposely designed to be similar in height, build and personality traits to series protagonist Korra, causing Korra to have to deal with "overcoming a version of her past self." Indeed, following Kuvira's debut, commentators noted similarities she and Korra shared. DiMartino said he enjoyed writing the dynamic between Kuvira and Korra as a female villain and protagonist, finding Kuvira to bring new "story and character possibilities" to the series. Kuvira is voiced by Zelda Williams, who according to Konietzko, was shown a picture of the character when auditioning for the role and found herself to be similar in physical appearance to Kuvira.

== Abilities ==
As an earthbender, Kuvira has the ability to manipulate the element of earth. She is also proficient in metalbending, capable of subduing numerous opponents by metal strips to cover their eyes and bind their limbs. Her metalbending extends to making knives, blades and whips, and sensing when other individuals are performing metalbending in her vicinity.

== Reception ==
Kuvira's rise to power and subsequent ruling over the Earth Kingdom has been compared by commentators to fascism. Kuvira has also been equated to a female version of Adolf Hitler, Matt Patches of ScreenCrush writing, "The same way a guy like Hitler can rise to power before a global audience and go unopposed by American forces for years into World War II, Kuvira can orchestrate fascist evil behind-close-doors and remain untouchable."

Reviewers have consistently spoken of how despite being an antagonist, Kuvira was understandable in her rationale behind her actions. Max Nicholson of IGN felt that the writers of the series did "a pretty good job of relating" Kuvira's motives rationally and commended her scene with Korra in "Enemy at the Gates" since it was the first time they sized each other up, also stating that the meeting conveyed how similar they were. Michael Mammaro wrote that while Kuvira was "a force to be reckoned with", he could not see her defeating Korra since the Avatar had just become empowered again. Matt Patches admitted to having first considered Kuvira a sociopath who was "lost in a cloud of ideology", but Patches believed following her fight with Korra that she was also "a little more cognizant" in regard to her own valor. Oliver Sava of The A.V. Club wrote that the audience saw her out of the public eye during the initial fight with Korra for the first time, but it was "hard to hate her after the work the writers have done establishing her motivations." Additionally, Mordicai Knode of Tor.com felt the character was the "winner" of the conflict after defeating Korra in the one-on-one fight, also in Knode's opinion making Korra and Suyin losers.

== Family tree ==
Beifong family tree

Lao Beifong	Poppy Beifong
Kanto	Toph Beifong	Suyin's father
Lin Beifong	Suyin Beifong	Baatar
Kuvira (Note: In Ruins of the Empire (2019–2020), Kuvira is shown to have been taken in as a child by Suyin Beifong, after being abandoned by her birth parents.)	Baatar Jr.	Huan	Opal	Wei	Wing
