= The Legend of Korra season 3 =

The Legend of Korra
- Season 3 Book Three: Change
- Third season DVD cover art
- Showrunners: Michael Dante DiMartino; Bryan Konietzko
- Starring: Janet Varney; David Faustino; P. J. Byrne; Seychelle Gabriel; J. K. Simmons; Mindy Sterling; Dee Bradley Baker; Kiernan Shipka
- No. of episodes: 13

Release
- Original network: Nickelodeon (Episodes 1–8); Nick.com (Episodes 9–13)
- Original release: June 27 – August 22, 2014

Season chronology
- ← Previous; Book Two: Spirits Next → Book Four: Balance

Book Three: Change is the third season of the animated television series The Legend of Korra, created by Michael Dante DiMartino and Bryan Konietzko, and consists of thirteen episodes ("chapters"), all animated by South Korean animation studio Studio Mir. The season began airing on Nickelodeon in the U.S. on June 27, 2014. After leaked episodes and following declining ratings, the series stopped airing on Nickelodeon after episode 8 on July 25, 2014. Episodes 9 to 13 of Book Three were subsequently made available on the Internet weekly through Nickelodeon's website and on digital download platforms.

The season takes place largely in the Earth Kingdom, one of the four major nations in the setting of the series, while depicting the re-emergence of airbending among people of other nations. The season's antagonists are the "Red Lotus", a group of dangerous anarchists led by the new airbender Zaheer who wants to overthrow the world's governments and the Avatar. Among the season's supporting characters are the now elderly Zuko (a character from the original series) and the family of Lin Beifong's sister Suyin.

== Episodes ==
No. overall	No. in season	Title	Directed by	Written by	Storyboarded by	Original release date	Prod. code	U.S. viewers (millions)
27	1	"A Breath of Fresh Air"	Melchior Zwyer	Tim Hedrick	Melchior Zwyer, Hyun Joo Song & Sol Choi	June 27, 2014	201	1.50
Two weeks after Harmonic Convergence, portions of Republic City have become covered in spirit vines and after Korra cannot remove them, President Raiko expels her from the city. Around the world, people begin to spontaneously develop the ability to airbend, including Bumi. Tenzin, Korra, and her friends embark on an airship trip to attempt to recruit these people into a new Air Nomad nation. Meanwhile, the dangerous criminal Zaheer (Henry Rollins) escapes from a remote prison thanks to his own new airbending skills.
28	2	"Rebirth"	Colin Heck	Joshua Hamilton	Olga Ulanova, Natasha Wicke & William Ruzicka	June 27, 2014	202	1.50
Traveling across the Earth Kingdom with Team Avatar and Jinora, Tenzin finds that most of the new airbenders are not willing to uproot their lives to join the new Air Nation, although they find a first recruit in Kai, a sly young thief trying to escape Earth Kingdom authorities. Meanwhile, Zaheer liberates the earthbender Ghazan (Peter Giles) and the armless waterbender Ming-Hua (Grey DeLisle) from their respective prisons and is apparently intent on abducting or killing the Avatar. An elderly Zuko (Bruce Davison) travels to the North Pole, where the last member of Zaheer's band is being kept.
29	3	"The Earth Queen"	Ian Graham	Tim Hedrick	Young Ki Yoon, Chris Palmer & Steve Ahn	June 27, 2014	203	1.29
Team Avatar arrive in Ba Sing Se as part of their search for new airbenders, and receive an ambivalent welcome from Queen Hou-Ting, who is of the belief that Avatar Aang manipulated her father in his time on the throne. Korra reluctantly agrees to a tax collection effort on the Queen's behalf in order to gain her cooperation, fighting off bandits with Asami during the mission. The queen nevertheless continues to claim that there are no airbenders in the city. Meanwhile, Kai absconds from the group to pickpocket, and while looking for him, Mako and Bolin meet the family of their late father. They learn that the city's secret police, the Dai Li (who are now more firmly under the control of the throne, but are still sinister in nature) are capturing new airbenders, and indeed Kai is arrested and forced to serve in the army. At the North Pole, Zuko, the new northern water tribe chiefs Desna and Eska, and Korra's father Tonraq visit Zaheer's last imprisoned comrade, his girlfriend P'Li, a dangerous firebender.
30	4	"In Harm's Way"	Melchior Zwyer	Joshua Hamilton	Sol Choi, Hyun Joo Song & Shaun O'Neil	July 11, 2014	204	1.19
At the North Pole, Zaheer and his team free P'Li from her icy prison, and she is revealed to be a powerful combustion-bender. In Ba Sing Se, Lin Beifong arrives to warn Korra about the threat to her life. With Lin's aid, Team Avatar liberate the press-ganged airbenders. After escaping the Dai Li and the Earth Queen's wrath, Tenzin takes the airbenders to the Northern Air Temple on their consent, while Lin, Korra, and her friends search for more airbenders.
31	5	"The Metal Clan"	Colin Heck	Michael Dante DiMartino	Eugene Lee, Natasha Wicke & William Ruzicka	July 11, 2014	205	1.18
Team Avatar arrive in Zaofu, a metal city led by Suyin Beifong (Anne Heche), Lin's estranged half-sister and the mother of Opal (Alyson Stoner), a new airbender. Korra begins training Opal, but cannot convince Lin to mend the rift between herself and Suyin. In Republic City, Zaheer infiltrates Air Temple Island in an attempt to find Korra but escapes after he is identified and attacked by Kya.
32	6	"Old Wounds"	Ian Graham	Katie Mattila	Young Ki Yoon, Chris Palmer, Johane Matte & Matthew Humphreys	July 18, 2014	206	1.28
While Korra learns metalbending from Suyin, Lin confronts memories of her youth: as a young police officer, she was scarred by Suyin while apprehending her at a crime scene, and their mother Toph covered up the incident before sending Suyin away and resigning as police chief. After a violent confrontation, the sisters reconcile with one another. Meanwhile, Zaheer and his crew escape Republic City after a car chase with police and Zaheer, who proves capable of entering the spirit world, ascertains the Avatar's whereabouts.
33	7	"Original Airbenders"	Melchior Zwyer	Tim Hedrick	Sol Choi, Hyun Joo Song & Shaun O'Neil	July 18, 2014	207	1.33
At the Northern Air Temple, Tenzin finds it difficult to teach the new airbenders about Air Nomad culture. At Bumi's suggestion, he imposes a strict training regime, causing more stress and exhaustion. Jinora and Kai discover a herd of young sky bison and are abducted by poachers. With Jinora calling on the aid of spirits, they call to the other airbenders for help, and the criminals are easily overwhelmed. Tenzin promises to consider granting Jinora her airbending master tattoos.
34	8	"The Terror Within"	Colin Heck	Joshua Hamilton	Eugene Lee, Natasha Wicke & William Ruzicka	July 25, 2014	208	1.08
In Zaofu, Korra and Bolin continue to learn metalbending, and Opal leaves for the Northern Air Temple. At night, Zaheer and his team infiltrate Zaofu and capture Korra, but Team Avatar, backed up by Lin, Suyin and a contingent of metalbenders, are able to rescue the avatar, and the assailants retreat. In the subsequent investigation, Korra and her friends discover that Suyin's adviser Aiwei has been aiding Zaheer, but he escapes through a secret tunnel. Later, with the help of Suyin, Team Avatar sneaks out of Zaofu to pursue the attackers.
35	9	"The Stakeout"	Ian Graham	Michael Dante DiMartino	Young Ki Yoon, Chris Palmer, Justin Ridge, Haiwei Hou & Matthew Humphreys	August 1, 2014	209	N/A
Team Avatar follows Aiwei to the Misty Palms Oasis, and Korra enters the Spirit World to find Aiwei and Zaheer meeting there. Zaheer throws Aiwei into the Fog of Lost Souls and explains the goals of his secret society, the Red Lotus, to Korra: a malevolent offshoot of the Order of the White Lotus, they want to overthrow governments, in service of the ideological belief that chaos is the natural state of the world. While Zaheer stalls for time, his allies close in on Korra's inanimate body. Bolin and Mako are overpowered, while Asami, fleeing on Naga with Korra's body, is captured by the Earth Queen's forces. The Red Lotus follows in pursuit.
36	10	"Long Live the Queen"	Melchior Zwyer	Tim Hedrick	Sol Choi, Hyun Joo Song & Shaun O'Neil	August 8, 2014	210	N/A
En route by airship to Ba Sing Se, Korra and Asami escape from their cell but crash-land the airship in the desert. Working with the airship's crew, they escape a massive desert animal and arrive back at the oasis. In Ba Sing Se, the Red Lotus propose to exchange Mako and Bolin for Korra to the Earth Queen. After hearing of Korra's escape, they attack and defeat the Dai Li, and Zaheer uses his airbending to asphyxiate the Earth Queen to death. The Red Lotus destroys part of the city's inner walls, announcing that the city belongs to the people, and chaos breaks out. Zaheer frees Mako and Bolin and gives them a message for Korra. At the oasis, Asami and Korra meet Tonraq, Zuko, and Lin and hear about the revolution.
37	11	"The Ultimatum"	Colin Heck	Joshua Hamilton	Eugene Lee, Natasha Wicke & William Ruzicka	August 15, 2014	211	N/A
As the inner city of Ba Sing Se is looted and razed, and riots and fires spread throughout the outer city, Mako and Bolin escape with their family to the Misty Palms Oasis. They tell Korra that Zaheer intends to kill the airbenders at the Northern Air Temple unless she surrenders to him. After speaking to Iroh in the spirit world, Korra uses the Metal Clan's radio to contact Tenzin just as the Red Lotus attacks the Temple. Tenzin resists the invaders with his siblings while the other airbenders attempt to escape. After the defenders are overpowered, the Red Lotus throws Kya and Bumi off the mountain and subdue the exhausted and badly beaten Tenzin.
38	12	"Enter the Void"	Ian Graham	Michael Dante DiMartino	Young Ki Yoon, Chris Palmer, Elsa Garagarza, Dean Kelly, Steve Ahn, Johane Matte & Shaunt Nigoghossian	August 22, 2014	212	N/A
Korra agrees to give herself up to the Red Lotus to save the airbenders, but as she does so, her friends discover that Zaheer has already removed the hostages from the temple. Ghazan traps Tenzin, Asami, Mako, and Bolin with lava and flees with Ming-Hua, but Korra's friends escape successfully thanks to Bolin's new-found lavabending skills, though the Northern Air Temple is critically damaged in the process. Meanwhile, Lin, Suyin, and her metalbenders fight P'Li. Suyin breaks the deadlock by killing P'Li with the contained force of her own combustion-bending. Zaheer fights Korra and Tonraq, who is thrown off a cliff but saved by the metalbender captain Kuvira (Zelda Williams). Zaheer escapes with the unconscious Korra using his own newfound ability to fly.
39	13	"Venom of the Red Lotus"	Melchior Zwyer	Joshua Hamilton & Tim Hedrick	Sol Choi, Hyun Joo Song & Shaun O'Neil	August 22, 2014	213	N/A
The Red Lotus tortures a chained Korra by poisoning her with mercury, in order to force her to the point of death, triggering the Avatar State before they kill her, which would end the cycle of the Avatar's rebirth. However, a wrathful Korra overpowers her captors and fights Zaheer in the skies. Meanwhile, her friends find and rescue the airbenders. After Mako electrocutes Ming-Hua, he and Bolin narrowly escape Ghazan's collapsing the Red Lotus's lair on top of himself. As Korra is about to succumb to the poison, Jinora leads the airbenders to pull Zaheer out of the sky with a massive air vortex formed from their combined bending. Zaheer is captured, and Suyin metalbends the poison out of Korra. Two weeks later, in Republic City, a weakened Korra, using a wheelchair, watches as Tenzin anoints Jinora as an airbending master and rededicates the Air Nomads to a nomadic life of service to the world, following Korra's example.

== Cast ==
=== Main ===
- Janet Varney as Avatar Korra
- David Faustino as Mako
- P.J. Byrne as Bolin
- Mindy Sterling as Lin Beifong
- J.K. Simmons as Tenzin
- Seychelle Gabriel as Asami Sato
- Kiernan Shipka as Jinora
- Skyler Brigmann as Kai
- Anne Heche as Suyin Beifong
- Henry Rollins as Zaheer

=== Recurring ===
- Bruce Davison as Fire Lord Zuko
- Logan Wells as Meelo
- Darcy Rose Byrnes as Ikki
- Richard Riehle as Bumi
- Lisa Edelstein as Kya
- John Michael Higgins as Varrick
- Stephanie Sheh as Zhu Li
- Grey DeLisle as Ming'hua
- Peter Giles as Ghazan
- Kristy Wu as P'Li
- Alyson Stoner as Opal Beifong

== Production ==
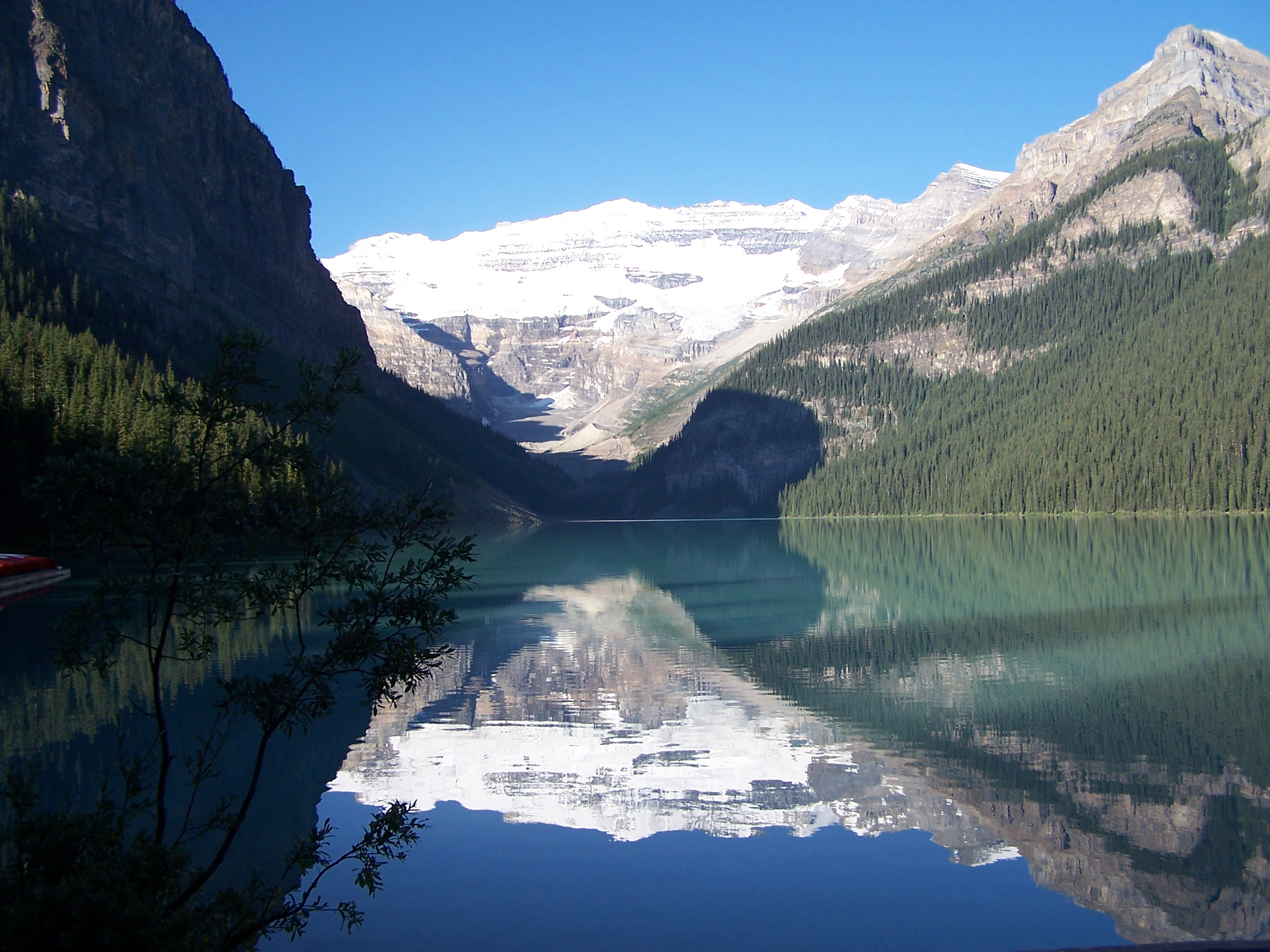
Lake Louise in Canada, the model for the setting of Zaofu

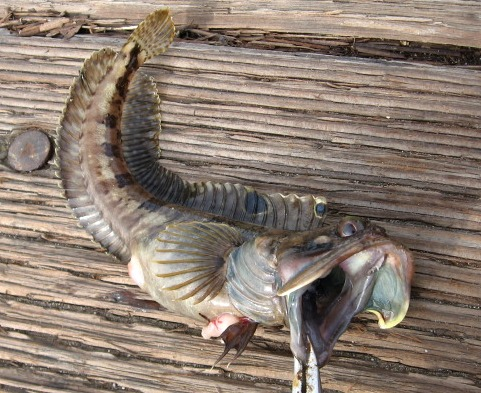
A sarcastic fringehead, Neoclinus blanchardi, the model for the sand shark in episode 10

=== Design ===
Book Three was the first season of The Legend of Korra to be created with a full in-house design and revision team, an expansion from the 25 to 30 people who worked for the series at Nickelodeon for seasons 1 and 2.

The design for the armless waterbender Ming-Hua was based on Bryan Konietzko's friend Michi, and Opal's hairstyle was based on that of Dolly Haas. The location of Zaofu, Suyin Beifong's metal-domed city, was inspired by Lake Louise in Canada's Banff National Park, and the exterior of Lake Laogai, the site of the Dai-Lin's headquarters, was modeled on Lake Tahoe.

The sand shark from which Korra and Asami flee in episode 10 is based on the sarcastic fringehead, a small fish found in the Pacific. For reasons of time, the designers re-used the design for Zuko and Iroh's apartment in Ba Sing Se from Avatar: The Last Airbender for the apartment of Mako and Bolin's family in episode 11. Another concept taken from the previous series, although not depicted there, was the notion of "becoming wind" as a high-level airbending form, which was included in the series bible of Avatar.

The idea of restraining the Avatar in X-shaped chains, as seen in the season finale, was originally conceived for the scene of Aang being captured by the Fire Nation in the first season of Avatar, but was then vetoed by the network. It was allowed this time, according to Konietzko, after he complained about seeing a shot of SpongeBob SquarePants, another Nickelodeon character, similarly restrained.

=== Animation ===
In producing the animation, Studio Mir was assisted by its subsidiary Studio Reve for some episodes.

=== Cast and characters ===
Book Three introduced many new characters that would recur until the end of the series, including the extended Beifong family and Jinora's romantic interest, the orphaned thief Kai, named after writer Josh Hamilton's son. Bryan Konietzko was worried about introducing him because of the growing roster of characters and his similarity to Aang.

Also according to Konietzko, beginning with Book Three, the series became a more visible property and was able to retain more well-known actors. Anne Heche auditioned and was cast for Suyin Beifong, Lin's estranged sister, and Jon Heder auditioned for the minor role of the apathetic adolescent airbender Ryu. Henry Rollins expressed interest for auditioning for the role of the season's main antagonist Zaheer, calling Konietzko and DiMartino from a tour to pose questions about the character.

=== Writing ===
The season's title, Change, was inspired by a Taoist motto, "the only constant is change", reflecting the changes in Korra's world as a result of her opening the spirit portals in season 2 and the reemergence of airbending, as well as the change of Korra as a person. The writers considered and rejected including a flashback to the Red Lotus's attempted kidnapping of Korra as a child, and also cut a scene of Asami and Lin sneaking into the airship in episode 4.

The amount of exposition scenes in Book Three worried the writers because of the danger of boring audiences. According to Konietzko, most notes from Nickelodeon amounted to "more fighting, more action!". The writers intended to set aside the love triangle among the main characters for Book Three and focus on Korra and Asami becoming friends. In addition, they began to allude to the possibility of a mutual attraction between the two that would result in them becoming romantically linked in the final moments of the series.

== Reception ==
Book Three received critical acclaim, with review aggregator Rotten Tomatoes calculating a 100% approval rating for the season from 9 reviews and an average rating of 9.5/10.

At Blu-ray.com, Kenneth Brown described Book Three as "a spectacular season of thrills, laughs, heartache, sophisticated storytelling, masterful world-building [and] harrowing battles", noting that with this season, the series was finally "standing shoulder to shoulder with Avatar: The Last Airbender". Describing a "sense of deep, unwavering confidence driving the entire series", with story, animation, dialogue and music coming together to "stunning ends", he wrote that as the protagonists entered early adulthood, the series adapted to see them overcome challenges in a much more seasoned and complicated manner that was not to be expected from a Nickelodeon series.

Max Nicholson for IGN described the third season as "easily the show's most consistent season to date, delivering complex themes, excellent storylines and unmatched production values." Writing for The Escapist, Mike Hoffman noted how the series respected its younger viewers by explicitly showing, but also giving emotional weight to the death of major characters, including "one of the most brutal and sudden deaths in children's television" in the case of P'Li in season 3. By portraying Korra's opponents, including the Red Lotus, not as stereotypical villains but as human beings with understandable motivations corrupted by an excess of zeal, the series trusted in viewers to be able to "resolve the dissonance between understanding someone's view and disagreeing with their methods". And, Hoffman wrote, by showing Korra to suffer from "full-on depression" at the end of the third season, and devoting much of the fourth to her recovery, the series helped normalize mental health issues, a theme generally unaddressed in children's television, which made them less oppressive for the viewers.
