= Zaheer (The Legend of Korra) =

Character from "The Legend of Korra"

- Avatar Legends character
- Zaheer in The Legend of Korra.
- First appearance: "A Breath of Fresh Air" (2014)
- Created by: Michael Dante DiMartino; Bryan Konietzko; Tim Hedrick
- Voiced by: Henry Rollins (2014); Aeric Azana (2026)

In-universe information
- Gender: Male
- Occupation: Red Lotus leader
- Significant others: P'Li (girlfriend; deceased)
- Bending element: Airbending (after Harmonic Convergence)
- Hair color: Black and grey
- Eye color: Dark brown

Zaheer is a fictional character in Nickelodeon's animated television series The Legend of Korra (a sequel to Avatar: The Last Airbender). He serves as the main antagonist of Book Three: Change, and his actions have lingering effects on Avatar Korra and the series' plot in the following book. The character was created by Michael Dante DiMartino and Bryan Konietzko and is voiced by Henry Rollins. The character was well received by critics as a complex and intimidating villain.

== Character overview ==
Zaheer was born after the Air Nomad genocide and grew up as a non-bender, a person who does not possess the ability to manipulate one of the four classical elements. However, he became fascinated with the Air Nomad culture and airbending philosophy from a young age and studied it rigorously; by adulthood, he was one of the few experts on the subject outside of Avatar Aang's descendants and students and an ardent spiritual follower of Guru Laghima, a legendary airbender who attained the power of independent flight. This expertise brought him into contact with an offshoot of the White Lotus society that came to believe that the Avatar must promote absolute freedom, not balance, as the driving force of world politics. This new society, the Red Lotus, collected masters of each element and plotted to kidnap the next Avatar as an infant and become his or her guiding philosophers and bending instructors; Zaheer was both a prominent member and the candidate to teach the new Avatar about airbending, even though he could not do so himself.

After failing in their attempt to abduct the new Avatar, Korra, as a toddler, all the present members of the Red Lotus were imprisoned in cells designed to block their bending; Zaheer was the exception as a non-bender, and was instead placed in isolation in a durable prison on a mountaintop. After Avatar Korra provided the catalyst for Harmonic Convergence during Book Two: Spirits, which connected the natural and spiritual worlds directly, Zaheer was one of many individuals who spontaneously gained the ability to airbend. In isolation, he quickly became proficient with the element and used his new abilities to engineer an escape. Shortly after, Zaheer freed each member of the Red Lotus in captivity and refocused their efforts towards convincing Korra to join them and seeking an anarchist overthrow of the existing kingdoms in the pursuit of 'total freedom' for all. For a short time, Zaheer disguised himself under the alias Yorru and joined the newly reformed Air Nation in an attempt to locate Korra; during this time, he easily impressed the other new and inexperienced airbenders, though his identity was eventually exposed both by his 'natural' ability, knowledge of Air Nomad culture and inability to provide details on his past, only narrowly escaping capture.

Zaheer managed to assassinate Hou-Ting, the queen of the Earth Kingdom, and threatened to kill all the air benders, drawing Korra out into the open. The Red Lotus captured her and subjected her to a systematic mercury-poisoning ritual intended to activate her connection the "Avatar State"; once triggered, they intended to kill Korra to prevent any future avatars from being born. Stopped short of killing her, Zaheer managed to cripple Korra physically and severely diminish her abilities; however, Korra's allies eventually fought and defeated the Red Lotus members to rescue her. During their final battle, Zaheer witnessed the death of his lover, P'Li. While devastated, he attained enlightenment in that moment to shed the last of his 'Earthly tether' and literally detach himself from the Earth, achieving independent flight — the first air bender to do so since Guru Laghima over 4,000 years prior.

Though the Red Lotus failed in their mission and were eventually killed or recaptured, Zaheer remained a powerful influence in Korra's life, and she struggled to psychologically overcome her defeat and crippling at their hands. She retained a personal fear of Zaheer for several years, only finding the ability to overcome this fear when Zaheer himself offered to become her guide in the Spirit World as an ally, agreeing to do so only because he realized that Kuvira, who took charge of the Earth Kingdom after the queen's death, was going against his own beliefs. Korra notes throughout their encounters that Zaheer is physically dangerous due to his skills but stands out from her other enemies as a singularly charismatic, honest, and idealistic foe; more than any other challenge she faced, Zaheer forced her to interrogate her role and intentions as the Avatar, and while she was supremely confident in her physical prowess and fighting skills, his questions caused her self-doubt in the core of her spirit.

The name “Zaheer” comes from the 3-letter Arabic root ظهر (z-h-r) that refers to support, help, and proponent.

=== Personality and characteristics ===
In a contrast to previous antagonists, Zaheer is portrayed as a much more sympathetic villain, as he does not desire conquest or oppression. Rather, he desires freedom, equality and brotherhood for all, be they human or spirit. He genuinely believes that he is leading a revolution that will bring equality to the masses, much like Amon, and is seen hesitating to truly use lethal force unless otherwise necessary to his goals. Zaheer embraces the idea that anarchism is the only way for the world to be truly free from the oppressors he seeks to destroy. He is also depicted as having a loving relationship with his girlfriend P'Li, whom he personally saved from subjugation at the hands of an unknown warlord, and enjoys a strong friendship with fellow Red Lotus members Ming Hua and Ghazan. Before attaining the power of airbending, Zaheer became notorious for not only his proficiency in martial arts but his ability to charm or manipulate people with his words, making him just as dangerous as his bender cohorts.

Despite his benevolent character traits, Zaheer remains an antagonist seeking to assassinate world leaders. Zaheer's character develops over the course of Book Three, as his well-intentioned and pleasant persona begins to fade as the search for Korra becomes increasingly drawn out and fruitless. Nearing the end of the season, Zaheer drops his pleasantries as he threatens the entire new Air Nation with extinction, and becomes far more malevolent when dealing with his enemies or captives. When his plans are foiled, he angrily rants that the Red Lotus' mission cannot be stopped before being imprisoned once again. After several years of incarceration, Zaheer appears to have made peace with his imprisonment, and is almost completely civil to Korra when she visits him in prison in Book Four. Zaheer's intelligence proves crucial to the final step of Korra's recovery, as she stops using him as emotional crutch to blame her slow recovery on and faces her fears of their last encounter head on. It is also Zaheer's way of making penance for his assassination of Earth Queen Hou-Ting, which allowed Kuvira to take control in a far more brutal regime than the last.

During production of the third book, Konietzko and DiMartino received a call from actor Henry Rollins, who was interested in taking the role of Zaheer and asked several questions regarding the role before auditioning and being cast. The two also noted that Rollins took the role very seriously, and was baffled when the character took on a more comedic role during a cameo in the Book Four episode "Remembrances". Zaheer was notably the first antagonist to survive the season he served as the primary threat in, a decision DiMartino and Konietzko made early on so that they might use him in the final season. Janet Varney mentioned that in the recording booth for the episode "Beyond the Wilds", Rollins recorded his part in a dark corner of the room, making him look intimidating to Varney and inadvertently helping her accurately portray Korra's fear of Zaheer.

== Appearances ==
=== The Legend of Korra ===
==== Book Three: Change ====
Disillusioned by the Order of the White Lotus revealing themselves at the end of the Hundred Year War and turning to serve the Avatar and the world's leaders, Zaheer joined the Red Lotus as a teenager, an offshoot of the White Lotus who sought to bring freedom of the world through chaos and anarchy. Thirteen years before the events of Book One: Air, Zaheer and his comrades plotted with Unalaq, the chief antagonist of Book Two, to kidnap the young Avatar Korra, and after indoctrinating her in the Red Lotus' ideology (unknown to Zaheer, Unalaq planned on using her to open the spirit portals and release Vaatu so he could become the Dark Avatar). However, Unalaq betrayed Zaheer, and he and his group were captured by Tenzin, Sokka, Zuko, and Tonraq. Shortly after the end of Book Two, Zaheer attains the power of Airbending due to Harmonic Convergence and quickly escapes his imprisonment. After freeing his cohorts Ghazan, P'Li and Ming Hua, they began pursuing Korra. After a failed attempt to capture her in "The Terror Within", Zaheer is confronted by Korra in the spirit world. Admitting that the Avatar deserved the right to know why she was being hunted - and stalling until his friends could capture her body - Zaheer openly tells her most of their plans, but neglects to reveal what their endgame with Korra was. However, to Zaheer's dismay, in the material world, Korra has been captured by Earth Queen Hou-Ting, and he ventures to Ba Sing Se with the captured Bolin and Mako. Zaheer initially convinces the Earth Queen to hand Korra over to him lest she suffer the other nations' wrath, but upon hearing Korra had escaped Hou-Ting's forces, lost his patience and kills the monarch by Airbending the air out of her lungs, making Zaheer the first Avatar character to graphically kill another on-screen. Zaheer anonymously announces his deed to the world and invited the Earth Kingdom to celebrate the tyrant's death by descending into anarchy.

As Ba Sing Se burns in the ensuing riots, Zaheer frees Mako and Bolin from the Earth Queen's jail, but asks them to pass along a message to Korra: surrender herself or the new Air Nation would be massacred. The Red Lotus arrives at the Northern Air Temple where they capture Tenzin, his family, and the new Airbenders, though not without Tenzin putting up a ferocious fight first. In the Book Three finale, Korra initially accepts Zaheer's terms to turn herself in, until learning of Zaheer's bluff regarding the Air Nation. In the ensuing battle, P'Li is killed, and despite being grief-stricken by his girlfriend's death, Zaheer's loss enables him to unlock the power of flight, which requires the abandonment of all "earthly tethers". Zaheer captures Korra, and the Red Lotus reveals that they would invoke the Avatar State by poisoning her, only to kill her and end the Avatar Cycle. However, the sheer power of the Avatar State proves too much for the Red Lotus to contain, and Korra escapes her confinements and engages in a lengthy aerial battle with Zaheer. When she begins succumbing to the poison, Zaheer attempts to asphyxiate her, but was defeated by the giant cyclone led by Jinora; and Korra. His plans ruined and his friends and girlfriend dead, Zaheer is captured and he's sent back to prison, though his claims that the Red Lotus still had numerous operatives around the world causes the world leaders to reflect on the danger his group still posed in the book's final scenes.

==== Book Four: Balance ====
Throughout the fourth and final book, Korra has post traumatic stress disorder from her final battle with Zaheer, haunted by his attempt to kill her and destroy the Avatar. Three years later, in "Beyond the Wilds", Zaheer is visited in his tailor-made dungeon by Korra, who is seeking to overcome her fear of him. Though he initially taunts her, Zaheer realizes the depth of her trauma and instructs her to let go of what he tried to do. Seeking to make amends for his actions that led to the rise of brutal fascist dictator Kuvira, Zaheer helps Korra to overcome her fear of him so she can finally enter the Spirit World and reconnect with Raava.

== Abilities ==
Prior to obtaining airbending, Zaheer was a master in several forms of martial arts and had extensive combat experience. Self-righteous and merciless in battle, Zaheer has shown himself a patient and composed man. He was deemed dangerous enough to be detained in an isolated prison and had to turn his back to the cell doors with his hands behind his head while receiving food. He is also proficient in the art of public speaking, capable of swaying the public opinion to support his goals, as he demonstrated in his speech to the people of Ba Sing Se.

=== Airbending ===
Zaheer is highly skilled in Airbending which utilizes aikido and the chinese martial arts techniques of baguazhang and xingyiquan. The series' creators consulted a professional martial artist in the design of the show's fighting style. Airbending represents the element of freedom, and is categorized as the most elusive of the "four bending arts". Airbending involves "smooth coiling and uncoiling actions"; dynamic footwork, throws, and open-handed techniques; and swift, evasive maneuvers designed to evoke the "intangibility and explosive power of wind". Zaheer is remarkably agile and acrobatic. Zaheer is not proficient as a full-fledged Airbending-master like Aang or Tenzin. Having studied the airbending forms and disciplines as part of the Red Lotus' plan to kidnap Korra, he was proficient enough to hold his own in combat against multiple powerful bending opponents at once. Since he is neither an Air Nomad, nor a pacifist, Zaheer consistently utilizes airbending to assassinate his opponents via suffocation.

==== Flight ====
Zaheer developed the ability of flight through the teachings of Guru Laghima, becoming the first airbender in four thousand years to do so. When his lover P'Li's died at the hands of Suyin during a battle to rescue Korra from the Red Lotus, Zaheer let go of his "final earthly tether" (a reference to Buddhism) and jumped off the mountain; but did not fall. Zaheer has demonstrated that the power of flight allows for fast and agile movements, being able to out-speed an injured Korra while she was in the Avatar State and performing airbending attacks whilst airborne. He doesn't appear to expend any physical energy while doing so, being able to defy gravity at will after having "entered the void"; this is in contrast to most other forms of bending, which are summoned through bodily or limb movements.

=== Spirituality ===
Zaheer is well-versed in Air Nomad spiritualism, philosophy and history; in particular, the teachings of the legendary airbender, Guru Laghima, whom he holds in high regard. Through meditation, Zaheer can enter the Spirit World and freely teleport himself and others to various places in that realm. Due to having practiced, trained, and meditated for decades, he can still communicate with his body in the physical world while his soul is in the Spirit World.

== Reception ==
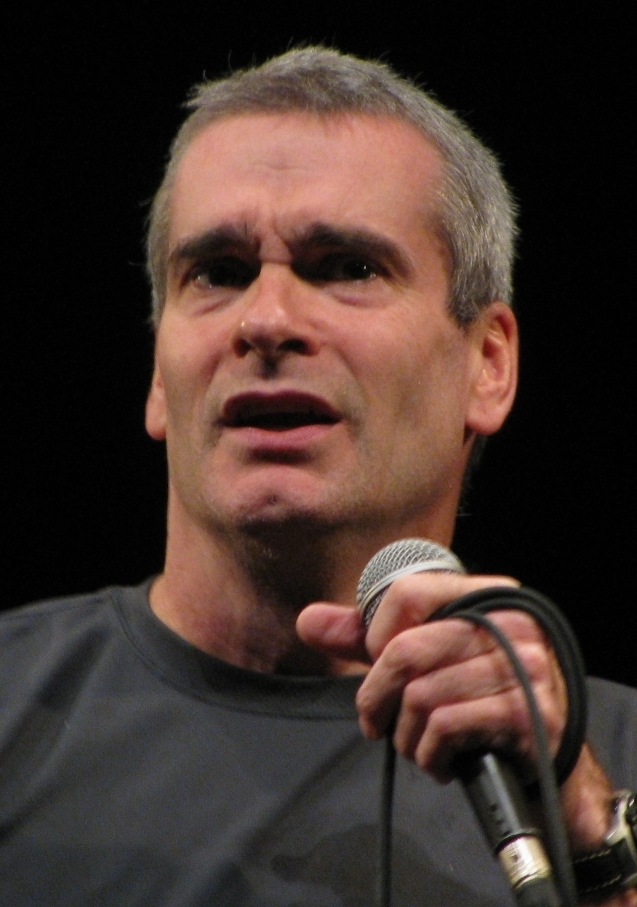
Henry Rollins received generally positive critical reception for his performance as Zaheer.

Zaheer has been widely well-received as a character by both fans and critics. Writing for IGN, Max Nicholson deemed Zaheer "one of the most intimidating and formidable villains yet on the show", praising his effectiveness as an antagonist and his actions that greatly challenged Korra's status as the Avatar. Nicholson also praised Rollins' voice acting in "Beyond the Wilds", declaring that he and Janet Varney had "really knocked it out of the park."

The scene in which Zaheer kills the Earth Queen during the episode "Long Live the Queen" received a strong, often alarmed reaction from critics. Nicholson called the scene "jaw-dropping", surprised at the explicit and on-screen death of Hou-Ting. Kenneth Brown of Blu-ray.com echoed Nicholson's sentiments, deeming scenes of Zaheer's bending "diabolical". Mike Hoffman of The Escapist called the scene "a turning point" for the series, where the audience discovers just how dangerous Zaheer really was, but an example of the respect the show's creators had for its audience regardless of age. Writing for The A.V. Club, Oliver Sava reflected that the scene's brutality was a reminder of how far the series had come since Avatar: The Last Airbender. Sava elaborated, "the moment firmly pushes The Legend Of Korra out of children's television territory and into the realm of young adult entertainment, trusting that the viewers are mature enough to see a woman get asphyxiated in rather graphic detail, complete with a close-up shot of the Earth Queen gasping for breath while her eyes bulge out in pain."

Zaheer's sympathetic nature and complexity as a character also received analysis and critical praise. IGN called Zaheer an "interesting" character, intrigued by his genuine respect for Air Nomad culture and his affability towards Korra during their conversation in the Spirit World. Mike Hoffman praised the effort made to portray Zaheer as a "particularly human" villain, citing the fact that he (as well as Amon and Kuvira) made "valid arguments" for their actions, as well as his loving relationship with P'Li.

IGN also praised the final fight scene between Korra and Zaheer in "Venom of the Red Lotus", listing it as one of the best fight scenes of 2014 and lauding its "distinct superhero feel".
