= The Legend of Korra: Ruins of the Empire =

American graphic novel series

- Cover of The Legend of Korra: Ruins of the Empire – Library edition, art by Michelle Wong and Killian Ng
- Date: May 21, 2019 (Part One); November 12, 2019 (Part Two); February 26, 2020 (Part Three)
- No. of issues: 3
- Publisher: Dark Horse Comics

Creative team
- Writers: Michael Dante DiMartino
- Artists: Michelle Wong
- Colourists: Killian Ng

Original publication
- Published in: The Legend of Korra
- ISBN: 9781506708942 (Part One); 9781506708959 (Part Two); 9781506708966 (Part Three); 9781506708935 (Library edition)

Chronology
- Preceded by: Turf Wars
- Followed by: Patterns in Time

The Legend of Korra: Ruins of the Empire is a three-part graphic novel series written by Michael Dante DiMartino, with art by Michelle Wong. The series was first announced in October 2018 as a three-part extended sequel to The Legend of Korra: Turf Wars, with the story centering on Avatar Korra and her allies as they deal with the fallout of Kuvira's surrender in the Earth Kingdom. Avatar Korra's romantic relationship with her close longtime friend Asami is also further explored in the series.

The first volume was published by Dark Horse Comics on May 21, 2019, the second on November 12, 2019, and the third on February 26, 2020.

== Plot ==
=== Part One ===
Three months following the defeat of Kuvira and the dissolution of the Earth Empire, King Wu, ruler of the Earth Kingdom, attempts to institute democratic elections of state governors as part of his efforts to reform his nation. Prior to the first election in the state of Gaoling, Wu learns about a group of Earth Empire separatists led by Commander Guan, a former subordinate of Kuvira's, and fears they will attempt to disrupt the election. To prevent this, Korra agrees to travel to Gaoling with Wu, along with her girlfriend Asami Sato, her friends Mako and Bolin, and the now imprisoned Kuvira, who had offered to try and talk Guan down.

Guan and his forces arrive in Gaoling's capital soon after Korra and her allies. They refuse Kuvira's request to surrender, prompting Kuvira to assault Guan before she is electrocuted into unconsciousness by Asami, who resents Kuvira for killing her father. After this, Guan reveals his intent to take part in the election himself, and have Earth Empire members do the same in other states, effectively restoring the Earth Empire. To foil Guan's plans, Avatar Korra and her allies decide to have Toph Beifong stand against him, while Guan is shown brainwashing people into voting for him.

=== Part Two ===
Avatar Korra and Wu travel to the Foggy Swamp to recruit Toph, where Wu has a vision of his deceased great-aunt Earth Queen Hou-Ting, who accuses him of only trying to establish democracy because he doesn't want the responsibility of rulership. Guan and his forces take advantage of Korra's absence to launch an attack on her docked airship, capturing Asami, Mako, Bolin and Kuvira. With the exception of Kuvira, who manages to escape, all of them are brainwashed into supporting Guan and opposing Korra. Kuvira meanwhile contacts Suyin Beifong, her now estranged mother figure and the ruler of the city-state of Zaofu, informing her of what had happened and convincing her to help.

Suyin arrives the next day, and Kuvira tries to persuade Korra to flee to Zaofu and gather reinforcements, as well as devise a way to break the brainwashing. Korra refuses to leave Asami, Mako and Bolin in Guan's hands however, and she and her allies attempt to rescue them. They battle Guan's forces and capture Asami, but King Wu is taken in turn, and Korra and her allies are forced to flee to Zaofu. Guan prepares to brainwash King Wu, while Kuvira reveals that to break the brainwashing, she will need the help of her former fiancée (Baatar Jr).

=== Part Three ===
Although initially reluctant to work with Kuvira, Baatar Jr creates a device capable of reversing the brainwashing, with Kuvira risking damage to her mind to help him in this process. Asami's brainwashing is broken, but Guan has Wu hold the election early, ensuring his victory. After learning of the situation, President Zhu Li Moon orders Korra to bring Kuvira back to the United Republic on the basis that there is no more use for her, but Kuvira escapes to Gaoling, prompting Korra and her allies to go after her.

Kuvira meets with Guan and tricks him into taking her to his brainwashing laboratory, where she attempts to brainwash him into giving up his plans. She is attacked by the still brainwashed Mako and Bolin before she can do so, but Avatar Korra and her allies come to her rescue, allowing her to defeat Guan. Mako, Bolin, Wu and the rest of Guan's victims are cured of their brainwashing, and Wu decides to relax his election plans and continue ruling, in order to ensure a successful transition to democracy. As thanks for Kuvira's role in stopping Guan, and because of her showing genuine remorse for her past crimes, Suyin arranges for her sentence to be commuted to house arrest in Zaofu. She assures Kuvira that, even though she is not a Beifong by blood, she will always be part of the family.
