= The Legend of Korra season 4 =

The Legend of Korra
- Season 4 Book Four: Balance
- Fourth season DVD cover art
- Showrunners: Michael Dante DiMartino; Bryan Konietzko
- Starring: Janet Varney; David Faustino; P. J. Byrne; Seychelle Gabriel; J. K. Simmons; Mindy Sterling; Dee Bradley Baker; Kiernan Shipka
- No. of episodes: 13

Release
- Original network: Nick.com
- Original release: October 3 – December 19, 2014

Season chronology
- ← Previous; Book Three: Change

Book Four: Balance is the fourth and final season of the animated television series The Legend of Korra by Michael Dante DiMartino and Bryan Konietzko. It consists of thirteen episodes ("chapters"), all animated by South Korean animation studio Studio Mir. The episodes were made available on the Nick.com website and other online outlets every Friday beginning on October 3, 2014, and later aired on Nicktoons beginning on November 28, 2014. Critical reception of Book Four, as of the series in general, was positive.

Book Four is set three years after the previous season. It deals with Avatar Korra's journey of self-discovery following the trauma she suffered in Book Three, and with the security officer Kuvira's campaign to unite the Earth Kingdom under her authoritarian leadership.

The season is followed by the graphic novel trilogy The Legend of Korra: Turf Wars, which picks up immediately after the series finale.

== Production ==
After Nickelodeon cut the budget for season 4 by about the amount required for one episode, DiMartino and Konietzko decided to include a clip show episode, which reuses previously produced animation, instead of letting many of the creative staff go. Inspired by Samurai Champloo's clip show episode "The Disorder Diaries", they chose to frame a series of edited clips from the previous seasons of The Legend of Korra with about five minutes of new animation. Aired as episode 8, "Remembrances", the clip show was also intended as "a lighthearted romp" similar to Avatar: The Last Airbender's episode "The Ember Island Players" before the series enters its dénouement.

== Reception ==
The season was generally well-received by critics. Critics generally enjoyed the main villain Kuvira and thought she complemented Korra well. IGN's Max Nicholson felt the overarching plot of Kuvira's military campaign was not as ambitious as previous seasons', though he still enjoyed it. Nicholson also praised the season for its handling of themes like war, dictatorship, weapons of mass destruction and post-traumatic stress disorder.

The series' final shot, intended to show Asami and Korra becoming a romantic couple, was seen as pushing the boundaries of LGBT representation in children's television.

"Korra Alone" was praised by critics as one of best episodes of the entire series, described by Nicholson as "masterful and heart-wrenching." "Day of the Colossus" received positive reviews for its action sequences, described by ScreenCrush's Matt Patches as "22-minutes of set-piece wizardry, featuring some of the most imaginative, heart-pounding action I've ever seen." In contrast, the clip show "Remembrances" was singled out as a weak point in the season.

In the final scene of the season and the series, Korra and Asami face each other holding hands. This scene recalls the earlier wedding scene between Zhu Li and Varrick, as well as the last shot of Avatar: The Last Airbender, in which Aang and Katara kiss. It was subject to discussion outside of entertainment media, notably after the series' creators confirmed that the scene was meant to signify Korra and Asami becoming a romantic couple. According to Joanna Robinson for Vanity Fair, who described the series finale as "the most subversive television event of the year", it "changed the face of TV" by going further than any other work of children's television in depicting same-sex relationships – an assessment shared by reviewers for TV.com, The A.V. Club, USA Today, IGN, Moviepilot and The Advocate. Megan Farokhmanesh of Polygon wrote that by portraying Korra and Asami as bisexual, the series even avoided the error of assuming sexual orientation, as many other TV series did, to be a strict divide between "gay" and "straight". In 2018, io9 ranked the final scene #55 on its list of "The 100 Most Important Pop Culture Moments of the Last 10 Years".

Like the third season, the final season received a 100% rating from 9 reviews on review aggregator Rotten Tomatoes and an average rating of 9/10.

== Episodes ==
No. overall	No. in season	Title	Directed by	Written by	Storyboarded by	Original release date	Prod. code
40	1	"After All These Years"	Colin Heck	Joshua Hamilton	Eugene Lee, Hyun Joo Song & Natasha Wicke	October 3, 2014	214
Three years after the defeat of Zaheer, the vain Prince Wu is about to be crowned Earth King, and Mako is assigned as his bodyguard. In the Earth Kingdom, Opal and Kai try to protect a community from bandits with limited success. Kuvira, who now styles herself the "Great Uniter", appears at the head of an army that includes Bolin, Varrick and his assistant Zhu Li. She offers the governor supplies and protection – if he submits his state to her sovereignty. The governor reluctantly agrees, and their conversation reveals that this has become a pattern as Kuvira consolidates more and more of the Earth Kingdom under her authority, which begins to appear increasingly despotic. Elsewhere, a despondent Korra is fighting and losing cage matches, having apparently renounced her identity as the Avatar.
41	2	"Korra Alone"	Ian Graham	Michael Dante DiMartino	Chris Palmer, William Ruzicka, Steve Ahn, Jen Bennett & Brendan Clogher	October 10, 2014	215
Over the past three years, a despondent Korra has been slowly recovering her health with the aid of physical therapy and healing administered by Katara at the South Pole, following her torture and poisoning at the hands of the Red Lotus. However, the effects of the assault and the other suffering and losses that she has faced has left her psychologically traumatized, and haunted by doubts that she will ever be the same again, and she has not been into the Avatar State since the assault. Tricking her family and friends into believing she has returned to Republic City, she is in fact wandering aimlessly throughout the world, isolating herself as much as possible from human contact. She is haunted by a dark vision of herself as she appeared in the fight with Zaheer, which appears to watch her wherever she goes. A spirit leads her into the banyan swamps which previously featured in Avatar: The Last Airbender, where her doppelganger apparition chases her down and attacks her, and she suffers a hallucination of drowning, but regains consciousness in the abode of Toph Beifong.
42	3	"The Coronation"	Melchior Zwyer	Tim Hedrick	Sol Choi, Elsa Garagarza, Shaun O'Neil & Owen Sullivan	October 17, 2014	216
At Wu's coronation in Republic City, Kuvira refuses to yield power to him, instead announcing that she will consolidate the territories under her control into a new Earth Empire. This creates a rift between her and the other world leaders including Suyin, as well as between Bolin and Mako, who has to protect the unpopular Wu from angry supporters of Kuvira. Meanwhile, in the banyan swamp, Toph agrees to help Korra regain her strength, though her methodology largely consists of browbeating Korra and beating her up with still formidable earthbending. She finds residual metal poison inside Korra but can't remove it – Korra subconsciously resists, scarred by her previous traumas. Meanwhile, Tenzin sends Jinora, Ikki, and Meelo to search for Korra, and Varrick experiments on spirit vines for Kuvira.
43	4	"The Calling"	Colin Heck	Katie Mattila	Eugene Lee, Hyun Joo Song, Olga Ulanova & Natasha Wicke	October 24, 2014	217
While the young airbenders look far and wide for Korra, Ikki is briefly captured by two Earth Empire soldiers. Based on what they say, Ikki leads the trio to the Foggy Swamp. There, Korra is still haunted by visions of being hurt by her past enemies, but manages to connect to the siblings through the great banyan-grove tree's roots. After they beg her to resume her Avatar duties to face Kuvira, Toph's advice helps Korra to let go of her fears, bend the rest of the poison out of herself and re-enter the Avatar State.
44	5	"Enemy at the Gates"	Ian Graham	Joshua Hamilton	Chris Palmer, William Ruzicka, Steve Ahn, Dean Kelly, Matthew Humphreys, Carli Squitieri & Jason Zurek	October 31, 2014	218
As Kuvira's army marches on Zaofu, Suyin refuses to let her city join the new empire, and Korra tries in vain to negotiate a peaceful outcome. Varrick and Bolin come to realize the totalitarian nature of Kuvira's rule, but their escape is foiled by Kuvira's fiancé, Suyin's son Baatar Jr. (Todd Haberkorn). While Zhu Li pledges her allegiance to Kuvira, Varrick is forced to weaponize the spirit vines for her, and Bolin is to be sent to a "reeducation" camp. In Republic City, Asami reconnects with her imprisoned father, Hiroshi.
45	6	"The Battle of Zaofu"	Melchior Zwyer	Tim Hedrick	Sol Choi, Elsa Garagarza, Shaun O'Neil & Owen Sullivan	November 7, 2014	219
After Suyin and her twin sons are captured while infiltrating Kuvira's camp to take her out, Kuvira agrees to a duel with Korra to decide control of Zaofu. Although now free of the effects of the Red Lotus poison, Korra remains off-balance and Kuvira goads her to gain further advantage, consistently outmaneuvering Korra. Unable to otherwise gain the advantage, Korra enters the Avatar State and prepares to deliver a devastating blow, until she hallucinates a vision of her dark spectre in Kuvira's place and collapses to the ground. Opal, Jinora, Ikki and Meelo save Korra and flee with her on the back of an air bison. Meanwhile, Varrick and Bolin escape after Varrick improvises a spirit vine bomb. Kuvira forces Zaofu's citizens to submit, and has Baatar Jr. and Zhu Li continue work on the vine superweapon.
46	7	"Reunion"	Colin Heck	Michael Dante DiMartino	Eugene Lee, Hyun Joo Song, Natasha Wicke & Olga Ulanova	November 14, 2014	220
As Korra reunites with her friends in Republic City, Wu is abducted on Kuvira's orders. Korra, Asami, and Mako rescue him from a train and hide him with Mako's family in Asami's mansion. Meanwhile, Bolin and Varrick encounter escapees from Kuvira's prison camps, which now house anyone not of Earth Kingdom blood, and help them escape from the now walled-in Empire. In the swamp, Kuvira's forces begins harvesting the spirit tree's vines.
47	8	"Remembrances"	Michael Dante DiMartino	Joshua Hamilton, Katie Mattila & Tim Hedrick	Joaquim Dos Santos, Ki Hyun Ryu, Lauren Montgomery & Michael Dante DiMartino	November 21, 2014	221
In a clip show episode, Mako, Korra, and Bolin recollect their past. Mako tells Wu about his romantic entanglements and eventual breakup with Asami and Korra. Korra talks to Asami about her confrontations with Amon, Unalaq, Vaatu, and Zaheer. Varrick presents Bolin's life to the Earth Empire refugees in the style of an action film pitch in which Bolin defeats all of Korra's previous enemies.
48	9	"Beyond the Wilds"	Ian Graham	Joshua Hamilton	Chris Palmer, William Ruzicka, Steve Ahn, Johane Matte & Carli Squitieri	November 28, 2014	222
In Republic City, Fire Lord Izumi and Tenzin refuse to endorse Raiko's proposed offensive against Kuvira even after Bolin and Varrick bring word of her vine weapons research. Reacting to Kuvira's harvesting of the spirit vines in the swamp, vines in Republic City begin to attack random people, Jinora included, trapping them in the Spirit World. Korra's psychological trauma prevents her from meditating to enter the Spirit World. Unable to think of another way to let go of the fear that continues to handicap, Korra decides to confront the real Zaheer in his prison. Zaheer, disgusted with the rise of a tyrant like Kuvira, who stands as the antithesis to the philosophies of the Red Lotus, proposes to help Korra. He assists her in learning to pass beyond the trauma of her past hardships, and helps her step into the Spirit World, where Korra speaks with Raava for the first time in many years. Using her restored ability to communicate with the spirits, Korra calms the volatile vines and frees Jinora and the other human captives. Meanwhile, Bolin attempts and fails to make up with Opal, but agrees to help her and Lin rescue their family.
49	10	"Operation Beifong"	Melchior Zwyer	Tim Hedrick	Sol Choi, Elsa Garagarza, Shaun O'Neil & Owen Sullivan	December 5, 2014	223
Near Zaofu, Opal, Lin, and Bolin are joined by Toph and track the Beifong prisoners to a facility where Baatar Jr. and Zhu Li are testing a vine energy supercannon. A rescue plan takes form, but tensions run high between the previously estranged Toph and Lin. Zhu Li proves to have been feigning her loyalty to Kuvira and attempts to sabotage the weapon, but her effort is discovered by Kuvira. The rescue team frees the captive Beifongs, who engage Kuvira and her forces together, before being forced to flee by Kuvira's superior numbers. Lin and Toph find a measure of reconciliation. Zhu Li reveals that Kuvira is planning an imminent attack on Republic City; she is determined to retake all of the lands which the Earth Kingdom had once ceded to the United Republic. Meanwhile, Korra tries and fails to convince the spirits to help defend Republic City.
50	11	"Kuvira's Gambit"	Colin Heck	Joshua Hamilton	Eugene Lee, Hyun Joo Song, Natasha Wicke & Olga Ulanova	December 12, 2014	224
Wu and Mako help evacuate Republic City, and Asami and Varrick build a fleet of flying mecha-suits to defend it. But Kuvira's forces attack earlier than expected. Her superweapon, now mounted on a giant mecha, devastates the Republic's navy, forcing Raiko to surrender. Korra and the airbenders capture the mecha's creator, Baatar Jr. After Korra threatens to keep him from Kuvira forever, he attempts to convince Kuvira to end the attack, but she has the mecha fire on his position, in an attempt to take out the Avatar and her allies.
51	12	"Day of the Colossus"	Ian Graham	Tim Hedrick	Chris Palmer, William Ruzicka, Steve Ahn, Chuck Drost, Johane Matte & Carli Squitieri	December 19, 2014	225
Barely surviving Kuvira's attack, Korra and her friends look for ways to take down the colossus. They discover that the exterior and joints of the behemoth mecha tank are made entirely of rarefied platinum and thus immune to metal bending. After paint bombs, lavabending, metal cables, collapsed buildings, Korra's bending, and an electromagnetic pulse set up by Varrick all fail to stop the giant mecha for long, Lin frees Hiroshi Sato, who proposes to take the mecha down from the inside. Asami, Hiroshi, and the newly engaged Varrick and Zhu Li attach plasma torches to the two remaining flight suits, then engage the colossus. After Hiroshi sacrifices his life by allowing the mecha to crush his flight suit in order to gain enough time to cut open a hole to the interior of the colossus, Korra's assault team is able to enter it.
52	13	"The Last Stand"	Melchior Zwyer	Michael Dante DiMartino	Elsa Garagarza, Shaun O'Neil & Owen Sullivan	December 19, 2014	226
In the mech's control room, Korra and Kuvira fight one another. Meanwhile, Team Avatar begin to take the giant apart from the inside. Suyin and Lin disable its arm and weapon, and Bolin and Mako detonate its power source, with Mako risking and nearly losing his life to blow the colossus into several pieces. Korra and Kuvira crash-land in the city's spirit wilds, and Kuvira activates the discarded cannon, triggering a staggering and self-sustaining release of energy powered by the vines surrounding them. Leaping to block the beam of the weapon from annihilating Kuvira, Korra enters the Avatar State and channels the massive outpouring of spirit energy, redirecting it and miraculously creating a third portal into the Spirit World. Emerging into the spirit world, Kuvira and Korra commiserate over their hardships and the mistakes they have made, and Kuvira concedes defeat and is arrested upon returning to the physical world. Weeks later, at Zhu Li and Varrick's wedding, Wu announces his intent to abdicate in favor of democratic Earth states. Korra and Asami plan a trip together to the spirit world; in the last scene of the series, the two walk hand-in-hand into the new spirit portal.
