= Endgame (The Legend of Korra) =

- The Legend of Korra episode
- The episode's title card
- Episode no.: Season 1 Episode 12
- Directed by: Joaquim Dos Santos; Ki Hyun Ryu
- Written by: Michael Dante DiMartino; Bryan Konietzko
- Production code: 112
- Original air date: June 23, 2012

Episode chronology
← Previous "Skeletons in the Closet"	Next → "Rebel Spirit"
- The Legend of Korra season 1

"Endgame" is the twelfth and final episode of the first season of the American animated television series The Legend of Korra, a sequel to Avatar: The Last Airbender. Production occurred under the code 1123 and the episode was directed by Joaquim Dos Santos and Ki Hyun Ryu and written by the Avatar franchise creators Michael Dante DiMartino and Bryan Konietzko. "Endgame" originally aired on Nickelodeon on June 23, 2012, and was animated by Studio Mir.

== Plot ==
Bolin, Asami, and Iroh are taken captive by the Equalists, led by Hiroshi Sato, but are rescued by Naga, who assists them in a fight between the mecha-tanks and the bombers, both of which end up destroyed, with Asami taking down her father.

Meanwhile, Mako and Korra attempt to expose Amon as a waterbender, however he removes his mask revealing burn scarring, claiming that it was from a firebender attack. This further hypes the Equalist crowd who now truly believe him. The situation makes a turn for the worse when Amon reveals he has captured Tenzin and his children, intent on removing their bending and finally making airbenders extinct. The two free the family, but Amon confronts them and removes Korra's connection to her water, earth, and firebending through bloodbending. Amon's lieutenant however witnesses this and tries to attack, but this proves useless as Amon merely casts him aside. This allows Mako to stun Amon in an attempt to escape with Korra, but just as Amon is about to remove his firebending, Korra unlocks her airbending abilities and ejects Amon out a window and into the ocean. In his attempt to survive drowning, he reveals himself as a waterbender and that the scarring was make-up to the shock of the other Equalists. Amon flees the city on a small speedboat and brings Tarrlok with him, saying that they could start a new life as brothers, but Tarrlok chooses to atone for his previously vile actions by blowing up their boat with an Equalist glove to kill Amon and himself.

Korra returns to the South Pole where Katara attempts to return her abilities, to no avail. While crying on the edge of a cliff, Korra is visited by the previous Avatar, Aang, telling her she has finally connected with her spiritual-self. With the appearance of all the previous Avatars, he then restores her lost bending abilities, after which Mako appears and the both of them admit their love for each other. Korra then restores Lin Beifong's earthbending to the amazement of the group and ends with Tenzin finally calling her, 'Avatar Korra'.

== Production ==
=== Development ===
The episode was meant to be the last in a planned miniseries entitled Avatar: Legend of Korra but the series was extended to 26, and then 52 episodes and "Endgame" became simply the season finale. The animation was done by Studio Mir via the most tradition method of frame-by-frame drawings, with each episode consisting of over 15,000 frames.

=== Release ===
The episode aired on June 23, 2012. Unlike its prequel series, The Legend of Korra was broadcast in high-definition. In August 2012, the episode was broadcast in countries outside of the United States. In addition, as of August 2020, the entire series was made available for streaming on Netflix, along with Avatar: The Last Airbender.

== Reception ==
IGN noted that the final scene with Tarrlok and Amon was in a way the most redeeming for Tarrlok, who has, in the past, been an antagonist of the season, as he sacrificed himself to kill his genocidal brother Amon, even though Amon wanted to start a better life with him. The Den of Geek liked Amon taking Korra's bending away, during the fateful scene where Amon is revealed for who he truly is: a waterbender.
