= Out of the Past (The Legend of Korra) =

- The Legend of Korra episode
- Avatar Aang and Toph Beifong arrest bloodbender Yakone.
- Episode no.: Season 1 Episode 9
- Directed by: Joaquim Dos Santos; Ki Hyun Ryu
- Written by: Michael Dante DiMartino; Bryan Konietzko
- Production code: 109
- Original air date: June 9, 2012

Guest appearances
- D. B. Sweeney as Avatar Aang; Kate Higgins as Toph Beifong; Chris Hardwick as Sokka; Clancy Brown as Yakone; Richard Epcar as Chief Saikhan; AJ Gentile as council page and metalbending officer

Episode chronology
← Previous "When Extremes Meet"	Next → "Turning the Tides"
- The Legend of Korra season 1

"Out of the Past" is the ninth episode of the first season of the American animated television series The Legend of Korra, a sequel to Avatar: The Last Airbender. The show follows Avatar Korra (Janet Varney), the only person capable of bending all four elements (water, earth, fire, and air), as she tries to maintain balance in the world, with this season focusing on her battle with Amon (Steve Blum) and his group of equalists as they intend to remove bending abilities from the world using Amon's ability to take bending away from an individual.

Like the rest of the episodes in the first season, "Out of the Past" was directed by Joaquim Dos Santos and Ki Hyun Ryu, and written by series creators Michael Dante DiMartino and Bryan Konietzko, and it follows a captured Korra who learns the truth about Councilman Tarrlok (Dee Bradley Baker) while her companions search for her. The episode also introduces the adult versions of original series main characters Aang (D. B. Sweeney), Toph Beifong (Kate Higgins) and Sokka (Chris Hardwick) through flashbacks that Korra receives as visions. The episode originally aired on Nickelodeon on June 9, 2012, and was watched by 3.58 million viewers. The episode received positive reviews.

== Plot ==
Tarrlok, who has captured Korra using bloodbending, (Note: As depicted in "When Extremes Meet") locks her in a platinum box in a cabin outside Republic City. In the box, Korra decides to reflect on the visions that Avatar Aang has been sending to her. She manages to view the messages, which show Aang's memories on the day he and Chief Toph Beifong arrested Yakone, a dangerous criminal who has the ability to bloodbend. When taken to court, Councilman Sokka and the rest of the Republic City council find Yakone guilty, leading Yakone to escape the court using bloodbending to stop anyone from following him. However, Aang gives pursuit and captures Yakone, stripping him of his bending abilities.

In the present, Tarrlok lies to everyone that the Equalists attacked and took Korra. Lin Beifong breaks into the Republic City Prison and breaks out Mako, Bolin and Asami Sato to help her rescue Korra and her captured men. (Note: The men were captured in "The Aftermath") The four approach Tenzin who agrees to help them. They break into an underground base where they manage to rescue Lin's captured men, but Mako interrogates an Equalist who reveals they never attacked Tarrlok and Korra and that they don't have the Avatar. Tenzin realizes Tarrlok took Korra. When they confront him about this, Tarrlok denies it. However, one of his defense attorneys tells the group that Tarrlok is a bloodbender, having witnessed Tarrlok bloodbend Korra the previous night. Tarrlok knocks everyone out using bloodbending and flees. Bolin also tells Asami that he witnessed Mako and Korra kiss, (Note: As depicted in "The Spirit of Competition") leading Asami to become jealous.

Tarrlok flees to the cabin where Korra reveals she knows he is Yakone's son. Just as Tarrlok is about to leave with Korra, the Equalists attack. However, Amon, impervious to Tarrlok's bending somehow, manages to take Tarrlok's bending from him. Korra escapes from the Equalists and collapses in a forest. Korra's animal guide Naga finds her and brings her back to the city. Mako pulls her off Naga and carries her in his arms, leading Asami to believe Mako has a crush on Korra.

== Credits ==
The episode was directed by Joaquim Dos Santos and Ki Hyun Ryu, and written by series creators Michael Dante DiMartino and Bryan Konietzko.

=== Main cast members ===
- Janet Varney as Avatar Korra
- David Faustino as Mako
- P. J. Byrne as Bolin
- J. K. Simmons as Tenzin
- Seychelle Gabriel as Asami Sato
- Mindy Sterling as Lin Beifong
- Kiernan Shipka as Jinora
- Steve Blum as Amon
- Dee Bradley Baker as Tarrlok

=== Guest stars ===
- D. B. Sweeney as Avatar Aang
- Kate Higgins as Toph Beifong
- Chris Hardwick as Sokka
- Clancy Brown as Yakone
- Logan Wells as Meelo
- Lance Henriksen as the Lieutenant
- Richard Epcar as Chief Saikhan
- AJ Gentile as council page and metalbending officer
- Jeff Bennett as radio broadcaster
- Maurice LaMarche as a defense attorney

== Reception ==
The episode received positive reviews from critics and fans of the show alike.

Emily Guendelsberger of The A.V. Club stated that they "didn't quite buy the voices of Toph and Aang", while writing "Aang in particular had a very expressive voice with a very wide range of tones in the original series, and it seems weird that puberty would replace that with a scratchy, serious monotone. Councilman Sokka’s voice was the only one I really bought as coming from the same character plus 30 years. (“With his mind.”) I did get a little shock of recognition from the animation of Toph’s body language and cursory wave with “Fine, come on, Twinkle Toes.”" Max Nicholson of IGN gave the episode a perfect score, writing that "this episode had everything: action, humor, intrigue and a healthy dose of rich backstory. While there wasn't a ton of bending this week, they more than made up for it by introducing some of the most compelling narrative we've seen thus far."

In 2023, Leo Noboru Lima of Slash Film ranked the episode as the 11th best of the show, writing that "Sometimes, nothing beats a good dose of nostalgia. All things considered, the first season of "The Legend of Korra" shows an admirable degree of restraint in the way it doses the glimpses into the "Last Airbender" characters' adult lives, especially considering it was originally intended as the show's only season. "Out of the Past," however, is largely structured as an opportunity to see the Gaang in action one more time. And it's pretty much impossible to resist.
