= Korra Alone =

- The Legend of Korra episode
- Avatar Korra after losing an earthbending cage fight.
- Episode no.: Season 4 Episode 2
- Directed by: Ian Graham
- Written by: Michael Dante DiMartino
- Production code: 215
- Original air date: October 10, 2014

Guest appearances
- Eva Marie Saint as Katara; Alex McKenna as Senna; Philece Sampler as Toph Beifong

Episode chronology
← Previous "After All These Years"	Next → "The Coronation"
- The Legend of Korra season 4

"Korra Alone" is the second episode of the fourth season of the American animated television series The Legend of Korra, a sequel to Avatar: The Last Airbender, and the 41st episode overall. The show follows Avatar Korra (Janet Varney), the only person capable of bending all four elements (water, earth, fire, and air), as she tries to maintain balance in the world, with this season focusing on her battle with Kuvira (Zelda Williams) as she plans to take over the Earth Kingdom and turn it into a dictatorship.

The episode was directed by Ian Graham and written by series co-creator Michael Dante DiMartino, and follows Korra struggling to physically and mentally recover from her battle with Zaheer in the season three finale. The episode originally aired on Nickelodeon's website on October 10, 2014, and received critical acclaim for its depiction of post-traumatic stress disorder (PTSD) in a children's show.

== Plot ==
After Jinora's ceremony, (Note: As depicted in "Venom of the Red Lotus".) a still paralyzed Korra leaves Republic City and returns to her home in the Southern Water Tribe. There she experiences nightmares about her battle with Zaheer. Korra's mother Senna, concerned for Korra's mental wellbeing, begs her to reach out for help from Katara. Over the next two years, Korra attempts to gain control of her legs again with Katara's help whilst avoiding contact with her friends Mako, Bolin and Asami Sato. Korra eventually learns to walk again and expresses joy.

Two years after Zaheer's battle, Tenzin visits Korra who is struggling to regain her fighting skills and still suffering from visions of Zaheer and herself chained while in the Avatar State. Tenzin advices the Avatar to be grateful for the progress she has made rather than worry about the future. Korra eventually responds back to Asami, letting her know the past couple of years have been the hardest of her life. She finally tells her parents she's ready to return to Republic City and continue her treatment there. However, when she returns to the city, she realizes she's not ready to be the Avatar again after she sees a vision of herself. She travels to the Earth Kingdom, picking up clothing from there, and she cuts her hair in order to avoid recognition.

Korra then travels to the North Pole to enter the Spirit World via the northern spirit portal. She tries to reconnect with Raava, the spirit of the Avatar, but she fails to do so. She writes to her parents lying that she has returned to Air Temple Island and has reunited with her friends, but instead wanders around the desert seeing visions of her chained self and Raava. Six months later, Korra enlists herself in an earthbending cage fight, but loses after she imagines her opponent as her chained self. Leaving the fight, bruised and with a black eye, Korra follows a white dog to the Foggy Swamp. There she falls into a shallow pool made of mercury that sticks to Korra and pulls her down. Unable to save herself, the hallucination of her chained self watches as she sinks completely into the pool. Sometime later, Korra wakes up to find herself attended to by an elder Toph Beifong, who addresses her as "Twinkle Toes."

== Credits ==
The episode was directed by Ian Graham and written by Michael Dante DiMartino.

=== Main cast members ===
- Janet Varney as Avatar Korra
- David Faustino as Mako
- Seychelle Gabriel as Asami Sato
- P. J. Byrne as Bolin
- J. K. Simmons as Tenzin
- James Remar as Tonraq
- Jeff Bennett as radio broadcaster, fishmonger, man, ring announcer

=== Guest stars ===
- Eva Marie Saint as Katara (Note: This is Eva Marie Saint's final television performance before her retirement in 2021 and passing in 2026.)
- Alex McKenna as Senna
- Philece Sampler as Toph Beifong, woman, vendor
- Morgan Gingerich as light spirit
- Max Charles as skeptical spirit

== Reception ==
"Korra Alone" received critical acclaim for its handling of complex themes and heavy subject matter such as Korra's post-traumatic stress disorder. Rick Stevenson of Looper stated the episode is a "masterpiece" for its chronicle of the "ongoing process of recovery — a process of anger, frustration, guilt, acceptance, failure, triumph, and change.", while C. K. Anderson of Loud and Clear Reviews wrote that "The importance of this storyline cannot be overstated, not just to Legend of Korra, but to children’s entertainment in general. Korra’s struggle with mental health and trauma and her ability to overcome it sends a vital message to young viewers that might be experiencing similar struggles."

The episode also received praise for Korra's character development, with Kaci Ferrell from Den of Geek writing "the writers have matured Korra and improved the way they write her that I thoroughly enjoyed an episode focusing entirely on her; if you’ll remember, a lot of us had major problems with not particularly liking Korra as a character and finding other characters more interesting than her. The fact that now in the fourth season I can watch this entire episode and honestly say it’s one of my favourites says a lot about how the quality of her writing has improved."

Many consider the episode to be the best in the series, such as Rich Knight from Cinema Blend who states that "'Korra Alone' is all about trauma and how some people deal with it. And sometimes, people can’t deal with it, especially when they close themselves off to other people. We learn that Korra has been physically and mentally suffering ever since her encounter with Zaheer, to the extent that she’s broken as not only the Avatar, but as a person, too. This is the deepest this show ever gets, and also probably the darkest."

Oliver Sava of The A.V. Club stated that the episode "details the Avatar’s three years of slow healing in one heart-wrenching character study, exploring the depths of her fear and self-doubt by pitting her against a familiar foe: herself." Max Nicholson of IGN gave the episode a score of 10 out of 10, writing that "It's rare that a 22-minute episode of a show can tell an emotionally satisfying story all its own, but this week's The Legend of Korra was definitely one of those episodes." and "the storytelling came from an emotional place, freeing up the episode to really explore Korra's PTSD and the affect Zaheer had on her physical and spiritual self. Beautifully animated, wonderfully scored and dramatically poignant, "Korra Alone" easily ranks among the best episodes of the series."
