= Book one =

Book one or book 1 can refer to:

- Book One: Water, the first season of the animated television series Avatar: The Last Airbender
- Book One: Air, the first season of the animated television series The Legend of Korra
- "Book One," a colloquial term for the self-help book Dianetics: The Modern Science of Mental Health by L. Ron Hubbard
- Book 1, upcoming studio album by Grimes
