= The Legend of Korra season 1 =

First season of the American animated television series The Legend of Korra

The Legend of Korra
- Season 1 Book One: Air
- First season DVD cover art; featuring (from left to right): Mako, Asami, Bolin, and Korra
- Showrunners: Michael Dante DiMartino; Bryan Konietzko
- Starring: Janet Varney; David Faustino; P. J. Byrne; Seychelle Gabriel; J. K. Simmons; Mindy Sterling; Dee Bradley Baker; Kiernan Shipka
- No. of episodes: 12

Release
- Original network: Nickelodeon
- Original release: April 14 – June 23, 2012

Season chronology
- Next → Book Two: Spirits

Book One: Air is the first season of the American animated television series The Legend of Korra created by Michael Dante DiMartino and Bryan Konietzko. Consisting of twelve episodes (called "chapters"), it was initially intended to be a stand-alone epilogue miniseries sequel to Avatar: The Last Airbender before the series was expanded to an order of four seasons ("books") of fifty-two episodes ("chapters") in total. Book One: Air aired from April 14 to June 23, 2012, on the Nickelodeon channel in the U.S., and is broadcast in other countries beginning in June 2012.

Book One: Air follows seventeen-year-old Korra from the Southern Water Tribe, and the successor of Avatar Aang from the preceding series Avatar: The Last Airbender, as she travels to the metropolis of Republic City to learn airbending and faces an anti-bender revolutionary group, the "Equalists", led by the masked Amon.

== Broadcast ==
Before the series premiered on television, it was announced that the first two episodes would be pre-released online if "Korra Nation", an online social-networking platform for the show, reached 100,000 likes and shares. The goal was reached and at midnight on March 24, the first two episodes were released on a Viacom-owned website. They remained online for the duration of the weekend.

Book One: Air aired on Nickelodeon between April 14, 2012, and June 23, 2012. For U.S. residents, the episodes were available for free viewing on the channel's website and for purchase through digital download services. Nicktoons re-aired Book One, with a few minutes of commentary from the series's creators during commercial breaks, from July 9 to July 20, 2012, under the name Korra: Making of a Legend.

This series debuted in Canada on channel YTV on June 9, 2012, and on Nickelodeon Canada in late 2012. The series also premiered on Nickelodeon UK and Ireland on July 7, 2013.

== Synopsis ==
The series opens introducing Korra as the Avatar and showing that she has mastered all elemental arts except airbending. Korra runs away to Republic City so that Tenzin, Avatar Aang's youngest son, can train her therein. In the metropolis, Korra clashes with police chief Lin Beifong (the daughter of Toph Beifong of the original series) after dispensing vigilante justice to the local triads. Tarrlok, an ambitious member of the city's ruling council, enlists Korra against the "Equalists", an anti-bender revolution led by the masked Amon. As Korra explores Republic City, she befriends the brothers Mako and Bolin and joins their pro-bending team, the "Fire Ferrets". The team is sponsored by Asami Sato, daughter of a wealthy industrialist, and the four together form the new "Team Avatar".

After Korra's appearance in the city, the Equalists become increasingly violent, climaxing in an attack on the pro-bending arena. When Tarrlok indiscriminately represses non-benders, Korra refuses to support him. In the resulting fight, Tarrlok overpowers Korra with bloodbending, an illegal form of waterbending, and kidnaps her, framing the Equalists. As Amon arrives at Tarrlok's hideout and removes Tarrlok's bending, Korra escapes, only to find Republic City facing an Equalist conquest.

In the two-part finale, naval reinforcements led by Iroh (the grandson of Zuko of the original series), are defeated by Equalist sea mines and biplanes. Attempting to find Amon, Korra learns that Tarrlok and Amon are the sons of Yakone, a mob boss defeated 42 years ago by Avatar Aang. Amon strips Korra of her bending abilities but Korra reveals her dormant airbending abilities in a moment of distress, exposing Amon as a waterbender and causing all his followers to desert him. He flees with Tarrlok, who detonates their boat on the open sea. Despondent, Korra establishes spiritual contact with her predecessor Aang, who restores her bending powers, allowing her to do the same to Amon's other victims.

== Episodes ==
No. overall	No. in season	Title	Directed by	Written by	Storyboarded by	Original release date	Prod. code	U.S. viewers (millions)
1	1	"Welcome to Republic City"	Joaquim Dos Santos & Ki Hyun Ryu	Michael Dante DiMartino & Bryan Konietzko	Kang Sung Dae, Kim Sung Hoon & Lee Dae Woo; Storyboard revisions by: Alan Wan, Hyun Joo Song & Adam Lucas	April 14, 2012	101	4.55
After Aang's death, (Note: The series takes place 70 years after the concluding events of Avatar: The Last Airbender) the Order of the White Lotus discovers the new Avatar, Korra, in the Southern Water Tribe. By the age of 17, Korra has mastered waterbending, earthbending, and firebending, but cannot yet airbend. Kept under lock and key by White Lotus for her own protection, she is frustrated by her isolation from the rest of the world, and anticipates completing her training with Master Tenzin, the son of Katara and Aang, and the only airbending master. However Tenzin also serves on the council of the United Republic (a nation created by Avatar Aang and Firelord Zuko) and civil unrest in the capital, Republic City, forces him to postpone her training. Unwilling to live under the strict confines of her life with the White Lotus anymore, Korra absconds from her compound on her polar bear-dog Naga and stows away on a vessel bound for Republic City. After a clash with triads, she is arrested by Republic City's metalbending police force, until Tenzin bails her out and allows her to stay with him. Meanwhile, the anti-bender "Equalist" movement's numbers are swelling due to inequities between benders and non-benders and its extremist militant arm is beginning to kidnap benders.
2	2	"A Leaf in the Wind"	Joaquim Dos Santos & Ki Hyun Ryu	Michael Dante DiMartino & Bryan Konietzko	Han Kwang Il, Kim Young Chan & LeSean Thomas; Storyboard revisions by: Alan Wan, Hyun Joo Song, Adam Lucas & Colin Heck	April 14, 2012	102	4.55
Frustrated by her continued inability to bend air, Korra visits Republic City's pro-bending arena against Tenzin's wishes. There, she befriends Bolin and Mako, two brothers on the "Fire Ferrets" pro-bending team. Filling in for their absent third member Korra initially suffers due to her inexperience, but wins the match using airbending principles. Tenzin, impressed, allows Korra to stay on the team.
3	3	"The Revelation"	Joaquim Dos Santos & Ki Hyun Ryu	Michael Dante DiMartino & Bryan Konietzko	Park So Young, Jeung Hae Young, Bae Ki Yong, Choi In Seung & Seung Eun Kim; Storyboard revisions by: Alan Wan, Hyun Joo Song, Adam Lucas & Colin Heck	April 21, 2012	103	3.55
Trying to collect money for their pro-bending fees, Bolin is recruited by the Triple Threat Triads, but they are all abducted by the Equalists. At an Equalist rally, the movement's leader Amon demonstrates his ability to permanently remove the bending powers of the captive gangsters, but Mako and Korra rescue Bolin before Amon can do the same to him.
4	4	"The Voice in the Night"	Joaquim Dos Santos & Ki Hyun Ryu	Michael Dante DiMartino & Bryan Konietzko	Han Kwang Il, Bae Ki Yong, Choi In Seung, Myoung Ga Young, Kim Sang Jin, Michael Dante DiMartino, Joaquim Dos Santos, Bryan Konietzko & Ki Hyun Ryu	April 28, 2012	104	4.08
Republic City Councilman Tarrlok creates a task force to capture Amon, and eventually recruits the reluctant Korra. Mako gains a paramour in Asami Sato, the daughter of industrialist Hiroshi Sato, who sponsors the Fire Ferrets in the competition. After some success on the task force, Korra challenges Amon to a duel. She is ambushed and captured by Equalists, but Amon, not wishing to make her a martyr, does not take away her bending but implies that he will eventually do so. Shortly after, Tenzin finds her, deeply traumatized and terrified as a consequence of the attack.
5	5	"The Spirit of Competition"	Joaquim Dos Santos & Ki Hyun Ryu	Michael Dante DiMartino & Bryan Konietzko	Lee Dae Woo, Kim Sung Hoon & Kang Sung Dae; Storyboard revisions by: Alan Wan, Hyun Joo Song, Adam Lucas & Colin Heck	May 5, 2012	105	3.78
Mako courts Hiroshi's daughter, Asami, much to the annoyance of Korra, who spends an evening with Bolin instead. Later, she kisses Mako, upsetting Bolin and the Fire Ferrets' chances in the championship. By the end of the episode, the Fire Ferrets forgive each other and advance to the championship match against the three-time defending champions, the popular and highly arrogant Wolfbats.
6	6	"And the Winner Is..."	Joaquim Dos Santos & Ki Hyun Ryu	Michael Dante DiMartino & Bryan Konietzko	Han Kwang Il, Kim Young Chan & LeSean Thomas; Storyboard revisions by: Alan Wan, Hyun Joo Song, Adam Lucas & Colin Heck	May 12, 2012	106	3.88
Amon threatens to attack the pro-bending arena if the Council does not cancel the championship. However, Chief Lin Beifong, head of Republic City's metalbending police force and Toph's daughter, promises to protect the stadium. The Wolfbats win the match by bribing the referees to ignore foul play. After the match is over, the Equalists, having infiltrated the arena in force, neutralize Chief Beifong's metalbenders using electric gloves, and Amon strips the Wolfbats of their bending abilities before a shocked crowd. Korra and Beifong free themselves and fight the Equalists, but the Equalists escape in an airship and the arena is heavily damaged in the fray.
7	7	"The Aftermath"	Joaquim Dos Santos & Ki Hyun Ryu	Michael Dante DiMartino & Bryan Konietzko	Choi In Seung, Park So Young & Bae Ki Yong; Storyboard revisions by: Alan Wan, Hyun Joo Song, Adam Lucas & Colin Heck	May 19, 2012	107	3.45
Tarrlok calls for Lin Beifong's resignation as chief of police, while Mako and Bolin move into the Sato mansion. While visiting them, Korra overhears implications that Hiroshi Sato is colluding with the Equalists and informs Chief Beifong and Tenzin, who find no evidence. An Equalist claiming to be disillusioned with the war reveals that Sato has a secret factory under his mansion, used to manufacture weapons for the Equalists. When Korra, Tenzin, and Beifong discover the secret factory, they are attacked by Equalists using large combat machines built by Sato, who reveals that the source was a trap. Beifong's metalbending officers are captured and taken to Amon, but Mako, Bolin, and Asami rescue Korra, Tenzin, and Beifong. Beifong decides to resign her post and rescue her officers, while Korra offers Mako, Bolin, and Asami sanctuary on Tenzin's Air Temple Island.
8	8	"When Extremes Meet"	Joaquim Dos Santos & Ki Hyun Ryu	Michael Dante DiMartino & Bryan Konietzko	Myoung Ga Young, Kim Eui Jeong, LeSean Thomas & Kang Sung Dae; Storyboard revisions by: Alan Wan, Hyun Joo Song, Adam Lucas & Colin Heck	June 2, 2012	108	2.98
At his inauguration as Beifong's replacement, Police Chief Saikhan vows to support Tarrlok's task force, leading Tenzin and Korra to quarrel with Tarrlok. Korra expresses frustration with her inability to airbend, and Tenzin tells her to obtain help from her past lives. Asami, Mako, Bolin, and Korra form a new "Team Avatar", patrolling the city and capturing Equalists, to Tarrlok's disapproval. Tarrlok places all non-benders under a curfew, and orders the arrest of a mob who refuses to disperse in obedience of the curfew. Korra tries to free the unarmed civilians, and Tarrlok arrests her friends to stop her. Later that night, she seeks Tarrlok out in private and he proposes to free her friends if she begins to fall in line with his wishes, but finding him to be corrupt, she angrily rebukes him and a bending battle ensues. Korra eventually gets the upper hand in the fight, only to have her fortunes reversed when Tarrlok reveals a dark secret: he is a bloodbender, able to manipulate human flesh through the water in the body. Tarrlok easily takes Korra captive using these skills and moves her to a cabin outside Republic City.
9	9	"Out of the Past"	Joaquim Dos Santos & Ki Hyun Ryu	Michael Dante DiMartino & Bryan Konietzko	Kim Sung Hoon, Lee Dae Woo, Bae Ki Yong, Choi In Seung & Park So Young; Storyboard revisions by: Alan Wan, Hyun Joo Song & Adam Lucas	June 9, 2012	109	3.58
Tarrlok locks Korra in a platinum box in the mountains, publicly claiming that Equalists abducted her. In response, Lin Beifong frees Korra's friends from prison and, with Tenzin's help, the five of them infiltrate the Equalist hideout, where Beifong frees her troops but an Equalist reveals that they had nothing to do with Korra's capture. Confronting Tarrlok in City Hall, a witness exposes Tarrlok's bloodbending powers, which Tarrlok uses to disable the group and escape. Meanwhile, Korra learns from Aang's past that 42 years prior, the mobster Yakone escaped trial by bloodbending the court, whereupon Aang removed his bending powers. Tarrlok confirms that he is Yakone's son, attempting to rule Republic City from a political seat rather than through crime. When Equalists track him back to Korra, his bloodbending proves ineffective against Amon, who takes away his bending. Korra escapes and reunites with Naga, who returns her to her friends.
10	10	"Turning the Tides"	Joaquim Dos Santos & Ki Hyun Ryu	Michael Dante DiMartino & Bryan Konietzko	Han Kwang Il, Kim Young Chan, LeSean Thomas, Bae Ki Yong & Lee Dae Woo; Storyboard revisions by: Alan Wan, Hyun Joo Song & Adam Lucas	June 16, 2012	110	3.54
After recovering from her abduction, Korra tells her story, and Tenzin asks Lin to protect his family while he attends the morning's council meeting. Tenzin is attacked at City Hall, and despite defeating his would-be abductors, he learns that the other council members have been captured by Equalists and that the city is under a full-scale attack by Equalists armed with Sato's newest weaponry and military technology. Amon's airships bomb Republic City as Tenzin reaches police headquarters and wires the United Forces, the United Republic's military, for help. Equalist 'mecha-tanks' capture Chief Saikhan and many officers. Korra and her friends rescue Tenzin. Tenzin's wife, Pemma gives birth to her fourth child, Rohan, as Equalist airships arrive at Air Temple Island. Lin Beifong, aided by Tenzin's other three airbending children, defeats the invaders. Korra goes into hiding and Tenzin flees with his family to preserve the last airbenders. Lin destroys an airship pursuing them, but is captured and refuses to reveal Korra's whereabouts, and is stripped of her bending. Korra's team enters the city sewers and General Iroh, the grandchild of former Firelord Zuko and commander of a fleet of United Forces warships, answers Republic City's plea.
11	11	"Skeletons in the Closet"	Joaquim Dos Santos & Ki Hyun Ryu	Michael Dante DiMartino & Bryan Konietzko	Bae Ki Yong, Choi In Seung & Park So Young; Storyboard revisions by: Alan Wan, Hyun Joo Song & Adam Lucas	June 23, 2012	111	3.68
Korra and her friends hide in hobo camp underground until Iroh's fleet arrives; but the fleet is promptly disabled by Equalist mines, aircraft, and torpedoes. Korra saves Iroh from drowning, and they regroup with the others. Korra and Mako go in search of Amon, while Iroh, Bolin and Asami sabotage the Equalist airbase to prevent the sinking of a relief fleet under Commander Bumi, Tenzin's older brother. Korra and Mako discover Tarrlok captive in Air Temple Island, where he apologizes for his treatment of Korra and reveals that Amon is his brother, Noatak, who ran away due to Yakone's mistreatment of his children. Meanwhile, the assault on the Equalists' mountain airbase goes poorly when the attackers fall prey to an electric fence.
12	12	"Endgame"	Joaquim Dos Santos & Ki Hyun Ryu	Michael Dante DiMartino & Bryan Konietzko	Lee Dae Woo, Bae Ki Yong, Choi In Seung, Kim Sung Hoon & Park So Young; Storyboard revisions by: Alan Wan, Hyun Joo Song & Adam Lucas	June 23, 2012	112	3.68
Bolin, Asami, and Iroh are captured by Hiroshi Sato and the Equalists, but rescued by Naga. While Asami and Bolin fight Hiroshi and his mecha-tanks, Iroh destroys the Equalist bombers. Korra and Mako confront Amon at an Equalist rally, and expose him as a bender. Amon denies it and reveals that he has captured Tenzin and his young family. Korra and Mako free them, but Amon overpowers Mako and Korra, and removes Korra's bending abilities except for her airbending, which she later unlocks and uses against him. Expelled by her, Amon falls into the sea, and his escape unmasks him publicly as a waterbender. He flees Republic City, along with Tarrlok, who later explodes their boat and themselves. At the South Pole, Katara is unable to heal Korra's severance from water, earth, and fire. As Korra sits weeping at a cliff's edge, Aang's spirit fully restores her spiritual connection and bending abilities and Korra enters the Avatar State to restore Beifong's bending abilities. Everyone watches in awe and amazement with Tenzin addressing her as Avatar Korra.

== Cast ==
=== Main ===
- Janet Varney as Avatar Korra
- David Faustino as Mako
- P. J. Byrne as Bolin
- J. K. Simmons as Tenzin
- Seychelle Gabriel as Asami Sato
- Mindy Sterling as Lin Beifong
- Kiernan Shipka as Jinora
- Steve Blum as Amon
- Dee Bradley Baker as Tarrlok

=== Recurring ===
- Logan Wells as Meelo
- Darcy Rose Byrnes as Ikki
- Lance Henriksen as Amon's Lieutenant
- Daniel Dae Kim as Hiroshi Sato
- Clancy Brown as Yakone

== Reception ==
=== Reviews ===
Book One received very positive reviews from critics, with review aggregator Rotten Tomatoes calculating a 91% approval rating for the season from 11 reviews, with an average rating of 8.25/10. The website's critical consensus reads, "The Legend of Korra expands the world of Avatar: The Last Airbender with narrative substance and crisp animation -- and progresses the drama and action with a female lead."

Elements of the first season that received praise were the exceptional quality of the animation, the background paintings and the martial-arts action scenes, as well as the series' innovative and engrossing visual design and style. The writers were credited for finding a believable balance between magic and technology and for their mature and nuanced portrayal of romantic relationships and conflicts. Critics also praised the writers' willingness and ability to tackle difficult themes such as social unrest, terrorism, Tarrlok's murder–suicide of Amon, as well as the insinuation of Korra contemplating suicide during the season finale.

While Book One: Air was generally well received, some aspects of the writing were criticized by reviewers. In Kotaku, Kirk Hamilton wrote that he felt that the series failed to tackle its central conflicts in a meaningful way, commenting also on the mix of comedy and drama, the many character arcs in a shorter series than Avatar, and the neat ending. Raz Greenberg of Strange Horizons commented that Korra seemed as though she had things too easy in life in comparison to Aang, and also criticized the show's rapid pacing. Max Nicholson of IGN praised the series' writing, animation, humor, setting, and characters, and wrote that elements characterized as a deus ex machina had been foreshadowed throughout. But in his opinion, the love triangle arc between Mako, Asami, and Korra fell flat and the pro-bending arc felt superfluous, although it led up to the conflict with Amon. He also considered that Mako, although a major character, felt underwritten. Lauren Davis of io9, while approving of the character arcs and the setting, was also disappointed about the series' pacing.

=== Ratings ===
The initial airings of Book One: Air, excluding reruns and digital downloads, drew an average of 3.7 million viewers per episode.

== Other media ==
=== Art book ===
The Legend of Korra — Book One: Air – The Art of the Animated Series
- Author: Dave Marshall (ed.), Michael Dante DiMartino, Bryan Konietzko
- Publisher: Dark Horse Comics
- Publication date: July 23, 2013
- Media type: Hardcover
- ISBN: 978-1616551681

An art book published by Dark Horse Comics, The Legend of Korra – Book One: Air – The Art of the Animated Series was released in July 2013. Edited by Dave Marshall and written by Michael Dante DiMartino and Bryan Konietzko, the art book collects concept art, sketches, storyboards, background paintings, model sheets and other development art from Book One, together with the creators' and artists' comments on the development process. Culture Mass praised the book as "meticulously executed and impressively comprehensive".

=== Home media release ===
Book One: Air of The Legend of Korra was released on DVD and Blu-ray on 9 July 2013. It contains audio commentary from the creators, the cast and crew. Both versions are to contain, as a special feature, a comical interview with the series' characters in puppet form. The Blu-ray version comprises, additionally, audio commentaries for all episodes as well as the extra "Series creators' Favorite Scenes: Eight Animatics".

=== Novelization ===
Book One: Air was adapted as two novels by Erica David, aimed at readers aged twelve and up. The novelizations were published by Random House in 2013:

- Revolution (ISBN 978-0449815540), adapting episodes one to six, published on January 8, 2013
- Endgame (ISBN 978-0449817346), adapting episodes seven to twelve, published on July 23, 2013

=== Soundtrack ===
The Legend of Korra: Original Music from Book One

Soundtrack album by Jeremy Zuckerman
- Released: July 16, 2013
- Genre: Soundtrack
- Label: Nick Records
- Producer: Benjamin Wynn

Avatar series chronology
The Last Airbender (2010)	The Legend of Korra: Original Music from Book One (2013)	Avatar: The Last Airbender – Book 1: Water (Music From The Animated Series) (2023)

The Legend of Korra is set to music by "The Track Team", the partnership of composers Jeremy Zuckerman and Benjamin Wynn. They jointly wrote the music for Avatar: The Last Airbender, but split their roles for The Legend of Korra: Zuckerman composed the music and Wynn was responsible for the sound design.

Bryan Konietzko and Mike DiMartino's concept for the score was to blend traditional Chinese music with early jazz. On that basis, Zuckerman and Wynn composed a score combining elements of Dixieland, traditional Chinese music and Western orchestration, performed mainly by a string sextet and various Chinese solo instruments.

A soundtrack CD, The Legend of Korra: Original Music from Book One, was released on July 16, 2013. It features 26 instrumental tracks. Konietzko wrote that the album release required "an incredibly frustrating wait and battle" to overcome "a bureaucratic impasse". He wished for the record to be commercially successful to convince Nickelodeon to release an Avatar: The Last Airbender soundtrack, a subject of many fan petitions. The day after its release, the album was the bestselling soundtrack album and no. 5 in the pop sales rankings at the online retailer Amazon.com.
