= Welcome to Republic City =

- The Legend of Korra episode
- Korra in Republic City
- Episode no.: Season 1 Episode 1
- Directed by: Joaquim Dos Santos; Ki Hyun Ryu
- Written by: Michael Dante DiMartino; Bryan Konietzko
- Production code: 101
- Original air date: April 14, 2012
- Running time: 23 minutes

Episode chronology
← Previous —	Next → "A Leaf in the Wind"
- The Legend of Korra season 1

"Welcome to Republic City" is the series premiere of the American animated television series The Legend of Korra, a sequel to Avatar: The Last Airbender. Written by series creators Michael Dante DiMartino and Bryan Konietzko and directed by Joaquim Dos Santos and Ki Hyun Ryu, the episode premiered online on March 24, 2012 and on Nickelodeon on April 14, 2012, beginning the series' first season.

The setting of the second Avatar television series has changed dramatically from the first series. Most events take place in a city known as Republic City, which is a "steampunk" style city. Most notably, the access to electricity in the new series substantiates the passing of time between the two series.

== Plot ==
57 years after the end of the Hundred Year War (as depicted in "Sozin's Comet"), three members of the White Lotus respond to claims from the Southern Water Tribe of a child as the Avatar by meeting 4-year-old Korra, the reincarnation of Avatar Aang who is already capable of bending water, earth, and fire.

13 years later, a now 17-year-old Korra has conquered the art and skill of waterbending, earthbending, and firebending in the Fortress—a place meant to teach the Avatar the elements away from harm—but has yet to learn airbending. Her waterbending master, Katara, who is now an old woman (with three grown children fathered by the deceased Avatar Aang), lets Korra go to Republic City after Katara's youngest son Tenzin is not able to teach Korra airbending at the fortress (due to being a member of the council of the United Republic) and seeing Korra frustrated by her isolation. Korra travels with her Polar bear dog, Naga, to Republic City, where she gets into a fight with a group of men who were going to rob an old man in the city. After being arrested for the resulting collateral damage, she meets Chief Lin Beifong, Toph's daughter, who is unhappy at Korra's arrival seeing it as a danger to the city. However, Tenzin bails her out of jail, preparing to send her back to the South Pole until he realizes that the Avatar is a vital part of the idea of Republic City, thus allowing her to stay and train in airbending. Meanwhile, Amon, leader of an anti-bender equalist group, learns of Korra's arrival, and tells his followers that he will have to accelerate his plans.

== Reception ==
The premiere averaged 4.5 million viewers ranking it as basic cable's number-one kids’ show and top animated program for the week with total viewers. The Legend of Korra also ranks as the network's most-watched animated series premiere in three years.
