= The Last Airbender (soundtrack) =

Film score by James Newton Howard
- Released: June 29, 2010
- Recorded: 2009–2010
- Genre: Film score
- Length: 66:46
- Label: Lakeshore Records
- Producer: James Newton Howard; M. Night Shyamalan

James Newton Howard chronology
Nanny McPhee and the Big Bang (2010)	The Last Airbender (2010)	Salt (2010)

Avatar series chronology
The Last Airbender (2011)	The Legend of Korra: Original Music from Book One (2013)

The Last Airbender is the soundtrack album of the fantasy adventure film The Last Airbender, directed by M. Night Shyamalan. The score was composed by James Newton Howard. It was released on June 29, 2010, by Lakeshore Records.

== Track listing ==
All music is composed by James Newton Howard.

No.	Title	Length
1.	"Airbender Suite"	11:16
2.	"Earthbenders"	5:53
3.	"The Avatar Has Returned"	4:42
4.	"The Four Elements Test"	5:30
5.	"Journey to the Northern Water Tribe"	4:01
6.	"Hall of Avatars"	3:40
7.	"Prologue"	2:43
8.	"The Blue Spirit"	7:17
9.	"The Spirit World"	5:18
10.	"We Could Be Friends"	4:08
11.	"We Are Now the Gods"	5:46
12.	"Flow Like Water"	6:32
Total length:		66:46

== Reception ==
Professional ratings
Review scores
Source	Rating
Allmusic	3.5/5 stars
Filmtracks	5/5 stars
If	(A)

In contrast to the universally negative reviews of the film, the soundtrack has received critical acclaim. Christian Clemmensen of Filmtracks.com gave it a full 5-star rating. Jonathan Broxton of MovieMusicUK also gave it five stars, stating that "It's constantly pleasing harmonics, interesting orchestrations, and powerful and heroic themes are thoroughly enjoyable from start to finish, making it one of the most satisfying musical experiences from 2010's summer season." James Southall of Movie-Wave gave it 4 stars. Tom Hoover of ScoreNotes gave the score a rating of 9.5/10, stating that "As far as collaborations go -- this one is the best of the lot between James and M. Night Shyamalan."

Two criticisms have been leveled at the commercial pressing of the album: the fact that the album presentation is lacking "narrative flow", which is "an aspect shattered by a non-chronological presentation of tracks on the commercial album for The Last Airbender", and that of the choir having been reportedly edited out of the release of the album due to re-use fees. Jonathan Broxton, though, says this: "There has been quite a bit of criticism aimed at Lakeshore Records for apparently not licensing the full choral elements heard in the film for release on CD; having seen the film, I can honestly say that whatever choral elements exist in the film are not especially missed on the CD release, and the final cue – “Flow Like Water” – sounds exactly the same here as it does in the theater."

== Accolades ==
The soundtrack was nominated for two International Film Music Critics Association awards in 2010 for Best Original Score for a Fantasy/Science Fiction/Horror Film and Film Music Composition of the Year for "Flow Like Water".
