= Lin Beifong =

Character in The Legend of Korra

- Avatar Legends character
- Lin Beifong in The Legend of Korra.
- First appearance: "Welcome to Republic City" (2012)
- Created by: Michael Dante DiMartino; Bryan Konietzko
- Designed by: Michael Dante DiMartino; Bryan Konietzko
- Voiced by: Mindy Sterling (The Legend of Korra); Grey DeLisle (young)

In-universe information
- Gender: Female
- Occupation: Chief of police
- Family: Toph Beifong (mother); Kanto (father); Suyin Beifong (half-sister)
- Significant other: Tenzin (ex-boyfriend)
- Relatives: Lao Beifong (grandfather); Poppy Beifong (grandmother); Baatar Jr. (nephew); Huan (nephew); Opal (niece); Wei (nephew); Wing (nephew); Affinity: Baatar (brother-in-law)
- Nationality: United Republic of Nations/Earth Kingdom
- Bending element: Primary: Earthbending; Sub-styles: Metalbending
- Age: 50 in Book One: Air; 51 in Book Two: Spirits and Book Three: Change; 54 in Book Four: Balance
- Hair color: Gray (originally Black)
- Eye color: Green

Lin Beifong is a fictional major character, voiced by Mindy Sterling, in Nickelodeon's animated television series The Legend of Korra, which aired from 2012 to 2014. She is part of the Avatar: The Last Airbender world. The character and the series, a sequel to Avatar: The Last Airbender, were created by Michael Dante DiMartino and Bryan Konietzko. Lin's mother, Toph Beifong, greatly aided the previous avatar, Aang, in his efforts to save the Earth Kingdom from destruction. Lin is the older of Toph's two daughters.

== Character overview ==
Lin Beifong is the Chief of Police of Republic City and the daughter of Toph Beifong, who once held the same position. Like her mother, Lin is able to both manipulate the classical element of earth, which is known as earthbending and its sub-ability to manipulate metal, which is termed metalbending. Like Toph, Lin also has the ability to sense movements around her through mechanoreception. She learned these techniques under the hard tutelage of her mother. Despite the fact that her mother was friends with the previous Avatar, Lin initially was decidedly antagonistic towards Avatar Korra, at one time interrogating the lead character. However, throughout the course of the series' run she warmed up to Korra.

Lin has a longstanding friendship with Tenzin, who is a son of Aang and Katara. At one point when they were younger, the two characters were romantically involved. Tenzin offered Lin comfort and a higher level of trust was reached between the two. However, their romantic relationship ended, partially because Tenzin wanted children while Lin did not and partially because of Lin's abrasive nature. Tenzin ultimately married, while Lin remained unmarried. Much like her mother, Lin's personality is described as tough, uncompromising and blunt. Unlike Toph however, Lin can also be characterized as bitter, which primarily stemmed from her strained relationship with both her mother and her half-sister, Suyin Beifong. In the latter half of the series run, Lin reconciled with the two characters, becoming less resentful as the series progressed.

== Creation and conception ==
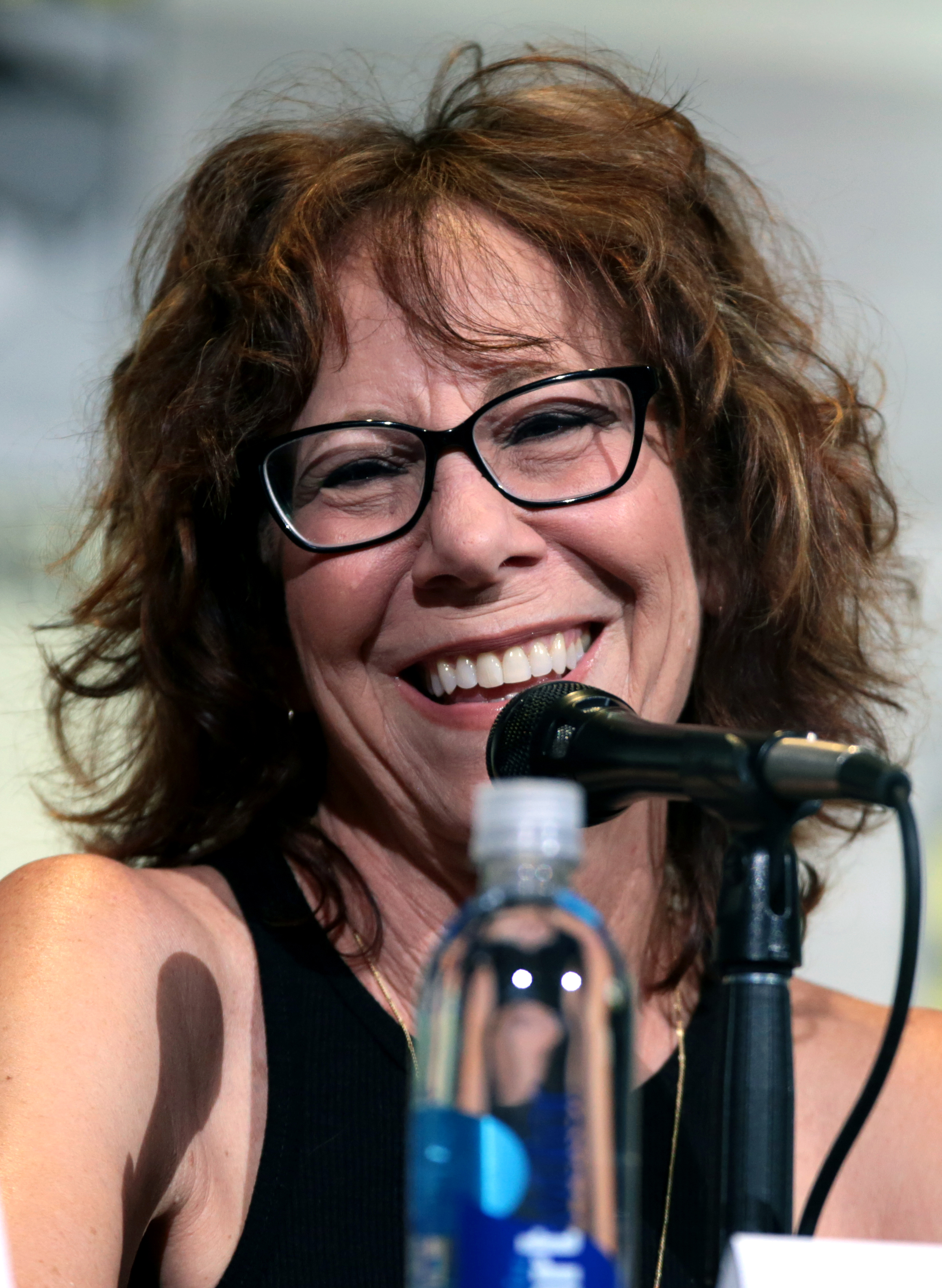
Mindy Sterling voices Lin Beifong.

While her mother was known during announcements for the series and established at the start of the series, the identity of her father was not revealed initially. Lin Beifong's character design was inspired by Han Young Ja, a longtime friend and colleague of Konietzko and DiMartino. Elements of her design also came from Marlene Dietrich as the creators wanted her "to have a tough and natural beauty" and her appearance was collaborated on by both Joaquim Dos Santos and series co-creator Michael DiMartino which DiMartino found to be "a fun process."

== Appearances ==
=== The Legend of Korra television series ===
==== Book One: Air (2012) ====
Lin spent the vast majority of Season One in Republic City. When Lin first met Korra, she made it clear that she held no favors for Korra. She interrogated the Avatar and when Tenzin arrived, Lin agreed to drop the charges against Korra, though made it clear that she wanted the Avatar "out of [her] city". Lin initially held a grudge against Tenzin over their breakup several years earlier, but agreed to “bury the hatchet” in their effort to secure a sporting event from a terrorist group, the Equalists. Despite maximum-level security, the Equalists were able to disrupt the event, overwhelming the police forces. Lin, with the help of Korra, was able to repel the terrorist group, though they were unable to capture the organization's leader, Amon. Korra had earned Lin's respect and trust in the process. After the Equalist attack, Lin received negative press for failing to capture Amon. Lin would lead an investigation that uncovered that industrialist Hiroshi Sato, Asami Sato's father, involvement with the Equalists. In an ensuing battle pitting Lin, Korra, Tenzin and members of the police force against the terrorist organization, a number of police officers were captured by the Equalists. The trio was able to avoid capture, but Lin elected to tender her resignation. When Tenzin encouraged her to not give up, Lin shared that she intended to capture Amon “outside of the law”. Later, with Tenzin needing to attend a council meeting, Lin watched over Tenzin's wife and children on Air Temple Island. Shortly, the Equalists invaded the island, incapacitating Lin in the process. Ironically, Lin was rescued by three of Tenzin's kids, Jinora, Ikki, and Meelo, who easily defeated the invaders. Upon Tenzin's return to the island, noticing that more Equalist airships were heading to Republic City Tenzin decided to take his family and flee Republic City on Tenzin's sky bison, Oogi. Lin accompanied the family. However, when it became apparent that Oogi would not outpace the airships, Lin made the decision to abandon Oogi and attack the fleet in midair in an effort to ensure the family's escape. In an impressive display of midair metalbending, Lin single-handedly destroyed a number of airships before she was captured by the terrorist organization, allowing Tenzin and his family to at least temporarily escape capture. Lin would lose her bending at the hands of Amon, who had the ability to take away bending, but would have it later restored by Korra.

==== Book Two: Spirits (2013) ====
In Season Two, Lin returned to Republic City, reinstated as Chief of Police. Impressed by Mako's outstanding work in busting local gangs, Lin hired Mako as an officer. Six months later, Lin and the Republic City Police force would investigate the bombing of the Southern Water Tribe Cultural Center. When Korra and Mako initially broke up (over issues related to the bombing) at the city police station, Lin, finding an overturned table, demanded to know what happened. Mako stated that he had broken up with the Avatar. Amused, she commented that he got off easy compared to her break up with Tenzin. A few days later, Lin traveled to Mako's apartment to investigate incriminating evidence in connection with the bombing of the cultural center. Mako adamantly denied any involvement in the bombing. However, when money and explosives were found in the apartment, she had Mako arrested. Lin and her fellow officers later provided security at the pro-bending arena during the premiere screening of a film starring Bolin. When Varrick, who bankrolled the motion picture, was outed as the mastermind of not only the attempted kidnapping of President Raiko at the event, but also the bombing of the cultural center, Lin promptly arrested him and freed Mako. Lin promoted Mako to detective, noting that the officer was the first to suspect Varrick behind the bombings.

==== Book Three: Change (2014) ====
In Season Three, Lin spent a significant amount of time outside Republic City. After helping Korra free captive airbenders in the Earth Kingdom capital of Ba Sing Se, Lin would join Team Avatar (Korra, Asami, Bolin and Mako) in searching for one more reported airbender in the Earth Kingdom city of Zaofu. When Lin arrived in Zaofu, she elected to stay on the ship instructing Team Avatar to not reveal her presence. As a result, Korra had to lie to the people of Zaofu about them being the only people visiting. However, Lin's presence was detected (due to a truth-seer named Aiwei seeing through Korra's lie) and Suyin, matriarch of Zaofu, met Lin on the ship. Suyin revealed to Team Avatar that she was Lin's sister, upon which Lin reminded her that she was her half-sister. Suyin shared that Lin's niece, Opal, was the airbender. At an ensuing dinner, Lin made a number of snide remarks to many of Suyin statements. Before the argument escalated they were interrupted by Varrick, who was out of prison and resided in Zaofu. Suyin later told Korra that during their childhood, Toph gave them lots of freedom due to her own strict childhood, which led them to believe they are being ignored and fought for their mother's attention: Lin became a cop while Suyin became a delinquent. A flashback reveals that Lin caught Suyin hanging out with some thieves, which she disapproved of. Later that night, Opal and Korra visited Lin in her room. In an attempt to reconcile the two sisters, Opal shared with Lin that she wanted her to be a part of the family. Lin responded with a cold "get out". Opal ran out of the room in tears. In response to Lin's behavior, Korra angrily told Lin that the police chief would always be a lonely and bitter woman before storming out of the room. Lin cried in her room alone. The next morning, Lin took up Suyin's trusted advisor Aiwei advice to visit the city's acupuncturist to deal with her stress. During the ensuing sessions, which involved reaching into her buried memories, she revisited her checkered past with Suyin. Lin flashed back to her attempt to arrest Suyin for her illegal acts and her subsequent scarring accidentally caused by Suyin. Their actions angered Toph and, not wanting Suyin to go to jail, is forced to tear up her arrest report, to Lin's dismay. This causes a rift between the three. Upon awakening from her final session, she disregarded the doctor's suggestion to rest, deciding instead to confront Suyin. An enraged Lin started yet another argument with Suyin, who blamed her for ending their mother's career, although Suyin claimed that Toph was a hero and retired the following year. After Suyin explained that she had changed her ways and made peace with Toph, the argument quickly escalated and when Suyin told Lin that she was a bitter, selfish woman and that Tenzin was right to leave her, Lin attacked, setting off a full-blown fracas between the siblings. When an angry Opal finally broke up the fight, demanding to know why two sisters would want to hurt each other, Lin passed out from exhaustion, sleeping for the next sixteen hours. Upon waking up, Lin was well-rested and was in a substantially more positive mood. She apologized to Opal for her behavior, explaining she was not comfortable speaking about personal matters. She advised Opal to train with the other airbenders away from home, which Opal ultimately did. Lin also reconciled with Suyin. Later, Lin would be involved in a large-scale clash with the Red Lotus, an anarchist group. During the battle she and Suyin fought P'Li, a formidable foe and combustion-bender. P'li had the rare ability to generate fire from her forehead, causing explosions. Lin relayed to her sister that when she drew P'Li's fire, Suyin was to incapacitate her. Suyin objected, but Lin told her sibling she loved her before unilaterally initiating the plan. The police chief was hit by a blast from P'Li, nearly falling over a cliff. In one of the series' more graphic moments, as P'Li was preparing to knock Lin off the cliff with a blast, Suyin quickly metalbent her plate of armor around the combustion bender's head. This caused P'Li's explosion to blow up in her face, instantly killing her. While the fatal explosion was not shown on-screen, P'Li's demise was apparent.

==== Book Four: Balance (2014) ====
In Season Four, set three years after the conclusion of Season Three, Lin would spend the majority of her time at Republic City. However, she did make one excursion outside the city, to save Suyin and many members of her family, who were imprisoned by the Earth Kingdom dictator, Kuvira. When the world leaders decided to not attack Kuvira, Lin immediately sought out Opal. Eventually the two allowed Bolin to join their mission, flying on Opal's sky bison, Juicy. Once the trio arrived at Zaofu, they encountered Toph, whom Lin addressed as "chief". After Bolin, through his stint as a soldier of Kuvira's army, was able to inform them the location of the nearest “reeducation camp”, the quartet left for the camp on Juicy. During dinner, Lin made a number of sarcastic comments towards her mother. When Bolin asked Toph who Lin's father was, her mother casually answered that it was a man named Kanto, who she characterized as a “nice man”. Sensing her daughter's "enraged breathing" Toph told Lin to say whatever was on her mind. Lin angrily replied that growing up without a father and never seeing or even discussing him was unacceptable to her. Lin declared that after the rescue, she wanted nothing to do with her mother. Toph solemnly stated that if that made Lin happy, she would accept her decision. The four would eventually successfully free Suyin and all the incarcerated members of her family. They would also rescue Varrick's longtime assistant Zhu Li. Lin and her mother would eventually reconcile with the latter stating that she was proud of both her and Suyin. Subsequently, Zhu Li informed Lin that Kuvira planned to invade Republic City in two weeks. Lin played a large role in the battle of Republic City. She along with Korra, Mako, Bolin, Tenzin, Bumi, Jinora, Ikki, Meelo, Opal and other airbenders battled a 25-story mecha suit, operated by Kuvira. She was part of the incursion team that successfully entered Kuvira's machine. Once inside, Lin and Suyin inflicted major damage. They rendered the suit's primary weapon, a large cannon mounted on its right arm, useless. When Kuvira ripped the now functionless arm off and violently tossed it away, Lin and Suyin were trapped in the appendage. The two were knocked unconscious by the resulting impact with the ground but would later regain consciousness. When Kuvira finally surrendered, Lin arrested the despot and led her away. Shortly after she and many others attended the wedding and reception party of Varrick and Zhu Li, Lin smiling as the newlyweds kissed.

=== The Legend of Korra comic series ===
==== Turf Wars (2017–2018) ====
In part one of Turf Wars, Lin is focused on taking down the triads with her triads task force. Lin, along with her task force, break up a fight between the Triple Threats and the Creeping Crystals. Two-Toed Ping is arrested and Lin and Mako then interrogate him and are able to find out the name of the new Triple Threats leader, Tokuga.

==== Ruins of the Empire (2019–2020) ====
Lin returns in Ruins of the Empire, the story centering on Avatar Korra and her allies as they deal with the fallout of Kuvira's surrender in the Earth Kingdom, appearing as an attendant of Kuvira's trial in parts one and three, and ultimately paying witness to her niece's redemption, as Kuvira is granted the use of the Beifong name by Suyin.

== Abilities ==
=== Heightened senses ===
By grounding herself barefoot, Lin can "see" and "feel" even the most minute seismic vibrations in the earth, be it the presence of trees or the march of ants several meters away. Lin has acquired an acute sense of hearing, enabling her to recognize people by their voices, discern a person's physical appearance by sound, and overhear distant conversations; and sense falsehood via the individual's subtle breathing patterns, heartbeat, and physical reactions.

=== Earthbending ===
Lin is highly skilled in Earthbending which utilizes chinese martial arts techniques of Hóng Quán and Chu Gar Nán Pài Tángláng. The series' creators consulted a professional martial artist in the design of the show's fighting style. Earthbending represents the element of substance, and is categorized as the most diverse and enduring of the "four bending arts". Earthbending is the geokinetic ability to manipulate earth, rock, sand, lava, and metals in all their various forms. Earthbending utilizes neutral jing, which involves waiting and listening for the right moment to act decisively. Earthbending involves enduring attacks until the right opportunity to counterattack reveals itself, emphasizes "heavily rooted stances and strong blows that evoke the mass and power of earth", and demands precise stepping footwork to maintain constant contact with the ground. Earthbending parallels Five Animals movements. Earthbending is at its strongest when the feet or hand are in direct contact with the ground, enabling earthbenders to transfer their kinetic energies into their bending for fast and powerful moves. This reliance on direct contact with the earth is a literal Achilles' heel; separating earthbenders from any contact with the earth renders them ineffective.

== Reception ==
Reviewer David Levesley called Lin one of the series' "standout characters" and one of the show's "many examples of well-written women". Reviewer Alyssia Rosenberg thought Lin was a "real standout" of the first season for her character arc, feeling it embodied a "small trend" of "female action stars" sacrificing themselves. She compared the scene where Lin lost her bending abilities to Amon to that of a scene in the film Sucker Punch and praised the soundtrack for being "a powerful representation of the sudden absence that has made Lin much of who she is." Robert Kuang felt that out of the major characters, Lin remained "the most intriguing", which Kuang attributed to her limited screentime and parentage. Before the reveal of Kanto, the character's father was a source of great intrigue for a number of fans of the show. A few theorized that Sokka or perhaps Amon was the character's father. Reviewer Michael Mammano viewed Lin's outburst at her mother during the fourth season as being "emotional" and akin to that of an angry child. Reviewer, Oliver Sava praised the depiction of the "icy" relationship between the character and her mother, noting that it better explained how Lin became "the rigid, chilly person she is today." TV.com felt Lin was similar to Varrick, a character introduced later in the show's run, for starting out on "one-note" but later becoming "layered" and wrote that it made sense that Lin would 'finally patch things up with" Toph after ending her estrangement with her sister Suyin.

However, the character and her arc did draw some measure of criticism from media and fans. Reviewer Gina Luttrell characterized Lin as "psychotic" for relating to Korra after the latter violently expressed her outrage with Mako during their initial break-up. Additionally, the mother-daughter reunion between Lin and Toph was characterized as "rushed" by reviewer Joey Sack. Sack suggested that the creators needed another episode to fully "flesh out" the conflict between the longstanding two characters. Zach Blumenfeld of Paste felt that Lin did not bring something new to the "tough cop" archetype, but commended her story arc for "beautifully" portraying the loneliness that a career woman can face. Overall, Blumenfeld ranked Lin as the 14th best character from the Avatar franchise.

== Family tree ==
Beifong family tree

Lao Beifong	Poppy Beifong
Kanto	Toph Beifong	Suyin's father
Lin Beifong	Suyin Beifong	Baatar
Kuvira (Note: In Ruins of the Empire (2019–2020), Kuvira is shown to have been taken in as a child by Suyin Beifong, after being abandoned by her birth parents.)	Baatar Jr.	Huan	Opal	Wei	Wing
