= Katara (Avatar: The Last Airbender) =

Character in Avatar: The Last Airbender and The Legend of Korra

- Avatar Legends character
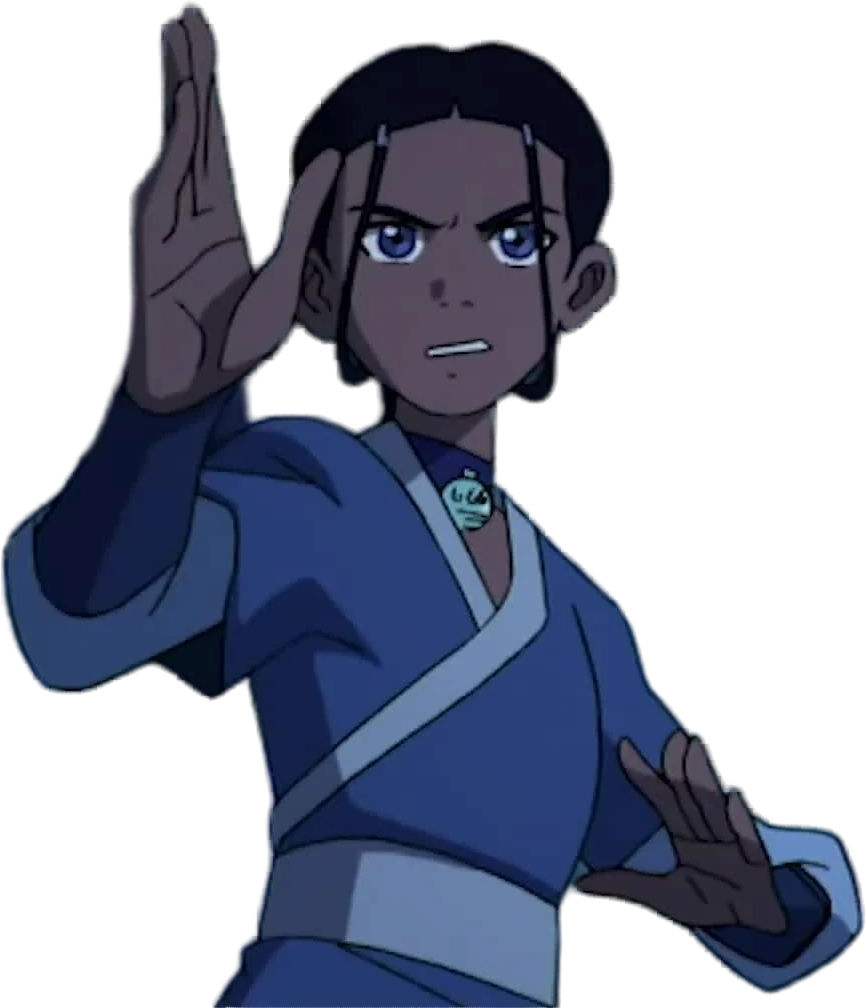
- Katara in Avatar: The Last Airbender.
- First appearance: Original series: "The Boy in the Iceberg" (2005); The Legend of Korra: "Welcome to Republic City" (2012); Live-action series: "Aang" (2024)
- Last appearance: Original series: "Avatar Aang: The Last Airbender" (2026); The Legend of Korra: "Korra Alone" (2014)
- Created by: Michael Dante DiMartino; Bryan Konietzko
- Voiced by: Mae Whitman (Avatar: The Last Airbender, Nicktoons MLB); Eva Marie Saint (The Legend of Korra); Jessica Matten (Avatar Aang: The Last Airbender); Sabrina Fest (2023–present; video games)
- Portrayed by: Nicola Peltz (2010 film); Kiawentiio (2024 television series)

In-universe information
- Gender: Female
- Affiliation: Team Avatar; White Lotus
- Family: Hakoda (father); Kya (mother); Sokka (brother)
- Spouse: Aang
- Children: Bumi; Kya; Tenzin
- Nationality: Southern Water Tribe
- Bending element: Waterbending healing bloodbending

Katara (Chinese: 卡塔拉; pinyin: Qiǎtǎlā) is a fictional character in the Nickelodeon animated television series Avatar: The Last Airbender and its sequel series The Legend of Korra, and is part of the Avatar: The Last Airbender world. The character, created by Michael Dante DiMartino and Bryan Konietzko, is voiced by Mae Whitman in the original series and Eva Marie Saint in the sequel series, The Legend of Korra. In the 2010 live action film adaptation, she was played by Nicola Peltz, while in the live-action television series adaptation, she is portrayed by Kiawentiio.

Katara was born in Wolf Cove, the capital city of the Southern Water Tribe. She is the daughter of Chief Hakoda and his wife Kya, as well as the younger sister of Sokka. Katara is first introduced as a 14-year-old "waterbender", meaning that she has the ability to control water and ice. She later learns how to utilise waterbending to control water in the bodies of living things, a subskill known as "bloodbending". At the beginning of the story, she is the only person with such abilities in the Southern Water Tribe, one of two known communities in which waterbending is practiced. She and her older brother, Sokka, discover an "airbender" (one who can manipulate air) named Aang frozen in an iceberg. They free him and accompany him on his quest to defeat the imperialistic Fire Nation and bring peace to the war-torn world.

Katara's history is marked by loss and the temptation of vengeance; she once stood before the man who killed her mother, with the power to end his life, yet she chose mercy, a choice which spoke volumes to her strength of character. She is recognized as the greatest waterbender of her generation, earning the title of Master Waterbender from Master Pakku of the Northern Water Tribe. In her adulthood, Katara became a world-renowned healer and married Aang. The couple lived on Air Temple Island and had three children: Bumi, Kya, and Tenzin. After Aang died, she moved back to the Southern Water Tribe, where she continued to work as a healer. In The Legend of Korra, Katara is Korra's waterbending teacher, a high-ranking member of the White Lotus, and one of the last surviving members of Team Avatar.

Katara has appeared in other media, such as trading cards, T-shirts, video games and web comics.

== Creation and conception ==
According to the un-aired pilot episode, Katara's name was originally 'Kya'. Nickelodeon's legal department vetoed the name when they discovered there was already a video game character named Kya, so they had to change it. 'Kanna' was first proposed to replace Kya, but it was used to name her grandmother instead. 'Kya' was later used for Katara's then-unnamed deceased mother. In "The Tales of Ba Sing Se", Katara's name was written as 卡 塔 拉. Kǎ (卡) means to check, block, or card; Tǎ (塔) means pagoda; and Lā (拉) means to pull. The character 'Lā' appears in the first season's finale as the name of the Ocean Spirit, while the character 'Kǎ' also appears in Sokka's name.

Bryan Konietzko and Michael Dante DiMartino originally conceived Aang, Katara, and Sokka as younger characters, but they were all aged-up by two years during development at the insistence of executive producer Eric Coleman, who said that Nickelodeon was not looking for coming-of-age stories. When the show began, Aang went from being 10 years old to 12, Katara from 12 to 14, and Sokka from 13 to 15 years old.

In the commentary of the unaired pilot episode, co-creators Bryan Konietzko and Michael Dante DiMartino state that Katara's "hair loopies" were intended to hang downward. The idea for her tied-back hair loopies came from Tin House animation director Yoon Young Ki, making it so that her hair was easier to animate.

In "The Women of Avatar: The Last Airbender" special on The Complete Book Three Collection, Michael Dante DiMartino and Bryan Konietzko have stated that they envision Katara as the deuteragonist of the series, as well as the "person the story is being told through".

The storylines and characterizations in the first season of the development bible and the animated series are largely the same, but the two significantly diverge afterward. One major difference is that the relationship between Katara and Aang never turns romantic in the original plan of the series. In both the bible and the animated series, Aang develops a crush on Katara as soon as he wakes up in her arms, and Katara cares for Aang like a mother figure. However, while Katara later develops a crush on him in the animated series, she never reciprocates his feelings in the bible and the two maintain a familial relationship. Katara only loves Aang platonically, like an older sister or babysitter, and Aang eventually learns to prioritize his responsibility as the Avatar over his infatuation with Katara. The bible describes their relationship as "the emotional heart of the show"; with Katara considering it "her duty to protect and nurture him" because "she wants Aang to grow up big and strong so he can fight the Fire Nation", and "Katara appreciates Aang’s gestures, but is not interested in romance. She dotes on him more like a kid she baby-sits rather than a potential love interest." The epilogue of the series in the bible concludes with the two going their separate ways; Katara sails off with Sokka and Hakoda to help rebuild the Southern Water Tribe, while Aang flies off with Appa and Momo to search for other Air Nomads living in an unexplored part of the world.

In the Avatar Extras for "The Avatar Returns" it is stated that "Zuko was originally going to be the love interest for Katara", and in "The Ember Island Players" it is stated that "the creators and writers toyed with the idea of Zuko and Katara falling in love". Co-creators Michael Dante DiMartino and Bryan Konietzko deny that they ever considered Zuko and Katara getting together, and claim that Katara becoming a couple with Aang was planned from the start. However, the initial proposal of the series as outlined in the development bible does not have Katara enter a romantic relationship with anyone, directly countering their claims that Katara was always intended to end up with Aang. Multiple writers who worked on the series have also made statements contradicting the co-creators. Writer John O'Bryan said that the topic of Zuko and Katara becoming a couple came up a lot in the writers' room. This is corroborated by writer Joshua Hamilton who says that the crew argued about who Katara should be with, and that there was a plan where Zuko and Katara ended up together. When reflecting on the writing process for The Ember Island Players, writer Tim Hedrick stated that Katara's rejection of Aang's romantic advances and the allusions to a potential relationship between Zuko and Katara in the episode allowed the writers to keep their options open, as Aang and Katara becoming a couple in the series finale was not a foregone conclusion, and Aang could have remained single. This aligns with comments made by M. Night Shyamalan, director of The Last Airbender film, who recalled that during the production of Book Three: Fire, DiMartino and Konietzko were uncertain, "At that time they hadn't even decided where things were going to end, even like who Katara was going to end up with."

=== Personality ===
Bryan Konietzko has described Katara's personality as "strong", "motherly", "caring", and "righteous". In many situations, Katara appears as a mother figure to Sokka, Aang and later Toph: a role attributed to her mother's death, her tribe's losses to raids, and the departure of many members to war, which required her to assume responsibilities beyond her age. Katara's history is marked by loss and the temptation of vengeance; she once stood before the man who killed her mother, with the power to end his life, yet she chose mercy. Katara tends to be kind, empathetic, and generous, but is often stubborn or confined by her morals; becomes angry if doubted, insulted, or betrayed; and can carry resentment for years on end. Katara has a fear of abandonment; holding a grudge against her father for leaving their family to fight in the war, and is troubled by Aang frequently running away without warning.

Katara desires to have someone to lean on as Sokka, Aang and Toph are far less responsible than her and she is burdened with the task of taking care of them. She quickly develops romantic feelings for Jet as he is older, wise, brave, determined, and became someone she could rely on for support. For the majority of the series, Katara mothers Aang, and despite her eventual limerence for him, views him as a younger brother rather than a love interest. She is aware early on that Aang is infatuated with her, but chooses to ignore it and act oblivious. Katara is conflicted when Aang questions her if she views him as a brother and wants to begin a romantic relationship with her. Bryan Konietzko has described the relationship between Katara and Aang as, "that dynamic of being the young kid having a crush on the older girl, and she loves you but like a babysitter, you know, like a little brother or something".

== Plot overview ==
=== Avatar: The Last Airbender television series ===
==== Book One: Water ====
When Katara was eight years old, her mother, Kya, sacrificed her life during a Fire Nation raid in order to protect Katara, since she was the only waterbender in the southern tribe. Though her interests lay in developing her waterbending skills, she resigned herself to cooking and cleaning duties while her brother, Sokka, trained to become a warrior. Three years later, Katara's father Hakoda, and the other warriors journey to the Earth Kingdom to oppose the Fire Nation, leaving Katara, Sokka, and their grandmother Kanna to look after the tribe.

The events of Avatar: The Last Airbender begins three years later, when Katara and Sokka find Aang in suspended animation and identify him as the Avatar, a messianic figure. To assist the Avatar and to further her mastery of waterbending, Katara joins Aang in his quest to reach the Northern Water Tribe and find a waterbending master, with Sokka alongside them. Upon arrival, Master Pakku refuses her apprenticeship because the customs of the Northern Water Tribe dictate that women cannot learn waterbending as a martial art, but upon noticing Katara's necklace, which he himself gave to Katara's grandmother, he agrees to teach her. Katara having achieved her own expertise, Pakku deems her sufficient to teach Aang.

==== Book Two: Earth ====
Katara then accompanies Aang to the Earth Kingdom for him to learn earthbending. At an Earth Kingdom stronghold, General Fong places Katara's life in danger to induce Aang's Avatar State, but achieves only destruction. After the earthbender Toph Beifong joins the group to teach Aang, Katara and Toph initially quarrel but thereafter become friends. In the Earth Kingdom's capital, Katara encounters antagonist Prince Zuko and his sister Princess Azula; during the battle, Aang is injured by Azula's lightning, whereupon Katara takes him to safety and eventually mostly heals his physical wounds. By this, Katara saves Aang from death in the Avatar State, also saving the Avatar Cycle from ending forever.

==== Book Three: Fire ====
In a village burdened by the Fire Nation's pollution, Katara disguises herself as the river spirit the Painted Lady in order to help the village. While staying with the semi-reclusive Hama, the protagonists learn she is a waterbender from the Southern Tribe who was imprisoned by the Fire Nation. Later, she offers to teach Katara a waterbending technique called "bloodbending", which enables physical control of animals and humans. When Katara refuses to learn this technique, Hama uses it on Aang and Sokka, forcing Katara to use the technique on Hama. Katara is a major player in the Day of Black Sun, comforting Aang when the invasion is a failure. When Prince Zuko joins the protagonists after the Invasion fails and gains everyone's trust, he fails to do so with Katara until he assists her in finding the man who was responsible for killing her mother, during the process of which she uses bloodbending. Though deciding not to take her revenge nor forgive, she does come to terms with Zuko and accepts him as her friend.

During the four-part series finale, Katara assists Zuko in preventing Azula from becoming the Fire Lord and battles her. Even though Azula cheats in the final Agni Kai between her and Zuko by shooting lightning at Katara, Zuko steps in, saving Katara but is hurt bad. Katara is the one the finishes the Agni Kai, defeating Azula, and healing Zuko. When the war ends, she is seen in Ba Sing Se with the other protagonists and shares a kiss with Aang, starting a romantic relationship with him.

=== The Legend of Korra ===
Katara, as she appears at 85 years old in The Legend of Korra.

==== Book One: Air ====
In the sequel series The Legend of Korra, Katara, now eighty-five, is one of the three surviving members of the original Team Avatar, along with Zuko and Toph. She is a high-ranking member of the White Lotus and took it upon herself to train Korra in waterbending, becoming the latest in a line of masters to serve as a teacher to multiple Avatars. Katara and Aang are also revealed to have had three children: the non-bender Bumi (who later acquires the ability to airbend), the waterbender Kya, and the airbender Tenzin. She plays a minor role in the first season of the series, only giving Korra her blessing to leave for Republic City to train with Tenzin and attempting to unsuccessfully heal her after she loses her waterbending, earthbending, and firebending abilities to Amon. But Korra manages to call Aang, who restores her connection to her elements, including energybending, and gives her control of the Avatar State, which Korra uses to restore Lin Beifong's earthbending

==== Book Two: Spirits ====
In the second-season premiere "Rebel Spirit", Katara is seen celebrating with her children at the Southern Water Tribe's Glacier Spirits Festival. While together with them, Katara, holding her new grandson Rohan, watches sadly as she notices Kya and Bumi joking at Tenzin's expense. At the end of the episode, Katara implores that Tenzin take his brother and sister with him to the Southern Air Temple, saying that he will enjoy looking back on the time he had to spend with his siblings and that it might be best for the three to visit their father's home together. In "Harmonic Convergence", Katara is seen in her healing hut attending to injured Southern Water Tribe soldiers, and later used healing to keep her granddaughter Jinora's body alive while her soul was trapped in the spirit world. In "Light in the Dark", she is seen listening to Avatar Korra addressing the independent Southern Water Tribe and how she decided to have spirits and human coexist by leaving the spirit portals open.

==== Book Four: Balance ====
In the fourth season episode "Korra Alone", Katara aids Korra in healing her body after being poisoned by Zaheer at the end of the third season, enabling her to walk again after being a wheelchair user for over six months.

== Abilities ==
Katara's abilities develop considerably throughout the series. At the outset, she has little control over her waterbending and often loses control in moments of frustration or anger. Thanks to diligent practice, an instruction scroll, and tutelage under a master, her skill improves until she is deemed a master herself. She was chosen to be Korra's master, and taught her waterbending and healing.

=== Waterbending ===
Katara is highly skilled in waterbending, which utilizes Chinese martial arts techniques of "internal style" tai chi and Jeet Kune Do; Katara is the only surviving master of "Southern style waterbending" after the 100-year war. The series' creators consulted a professional martial artist in the design of the show's fighting style. Waterbending represents the element of change – a shapeshifter constantly changing forms – and is categorized as the most adaptive or pliable of the "four bending arts". Waterbending emphasizes "softness and breathing" over "hard aggression"; fluid and graceful, acting in concert with the environment; and creating opportunities where none exist. This "flow of energy" allows their defensive maneuvers to translate into focus on control and counter-offenses, turning their opponents' momentum against them. Despite these advantages, waterbending is almost entirely dependent on inertia; it is essential for practitioners to not be rigid, but to be fluid and able to adapt to any situation.

"Water is the element of change. The people of the Water Tribes are capable of adapting to many things. They have a sense of community and love that holds them together through anything."

— General Iroh (Avatar: The Last Airbender, "Bitter Work")

Katara has demonstrated to be a formidable opponent to her enemies, able to fight on equal terms with Azula and Long Feng; she eventually outmatched the Fire Nation princess to demonstrate the extent of her skill. Katara can use water to cut through objects; summon lashing waves and whips of varying sizes; cover herself with a sheath of water; surf on a length of ice; run and stand on the surface of water; melt and control existing ice; form ice into various shapes; freeze water and objects surrounded by water with little effort; create walls of mist and steam; transform steam into ice; evaporate large amounts of water; or derive a weapon from any moisture including her own perspiration. She can control huge amounts of water at a time, forming huge waves and bubbles of water. On one instance, Katara knocked down the entire Dai Li, Zuko, and Azula while riding atop a giant wave. As with all waterbenders, Katara's powers increase under the influence of a full moon.

Katara demonstrates the ability to levitate and control water-based liquids, as well as pure water, in the episode "The Southern Raiders", wherein Katara bends ink onto a map. She is also seen bending soup (which allows her to cook meals), and bends perfume while battling a smell-dependent monster. In the episode "The Painted Lady," she uses her bending to create a thick fog. Katara also demonstrates the ability to bend sweat and the ability to manipulate mud with Toph, who manipulates the dirt while Katara controls the water.

==== Healing abilities ====
Katara is one of the few waterbenders born with the sub-ability of healing injuries or wounds, first demonstrated after she is burned by Aang's first attempt at firebending. She strengthens this ability under the tutelage of the Northern Water Tribe's healer Yagoda. She uses it thereafter to relieve sickness; overcome brainwashing; and heal wounds such as burns and bleeding injuries. Nevertheless, she cannot cure all sicknesses, mend brain damage, or heal internal injuries and birth defects. Using special water she obtained from the Northern Water Tribe's Spirit Shrine, she was able to heal a fatal wound Azula inflicted upon Aang, thus reviving him from death. She speculated that she would be able to use that same water to heal the scar on Zuko's face, but was interrupted before she could do so. By the time of The Legend of Korra, Lin Beifong (Toph's metalbender daughter) claims that she is the best healer in the world.

Scene where Katara learns bloodbending from Hama.

==== Bloodbending ====
Katara knows another waterbending technique known as "bloodbending". She first used this technique in the eighth episode of Book Three. This ability consists in manipulating the water inside a creature's body, leaving the target unable to move or resist in any way. Once she has taken control, she can make it move in any manner she desires. She is only able to bloodbend during a full moon, when her waterbending power is at its peak. Katara was forced to learn bloodbending by Hama, an elderly Water Tribe woman who originally developed the technique and who wanted Katara to learn it for it to be passed on to others. However, Katara abhors this technique and has only used it twice in times of great stress. She used it against her mother’s killer, but later forgave him. In later years, she worked to make the practice a criminal offense and ended up banning it in Republic City.

== Appearances in other media ==
Katara's character appeared in the Avatar: The Last Airbender Trading Card Game and three THQ video games, including the eponymous video game, Avatar: The Last Airbender – The Burning Earth, and Avatar: The Last Airbender – Into the Inferno.

Like Aang, Katara also appeared in Tokyopop's films comic (sometimes referred to as cine-manga).

Nicola Peltz portrayed Katara in the 2010 film adaptation of the series, The Last Airbender, directed by M. Night Shyamalan. Kiawentiio portrays Katara in the live-action television series adaptation, Avatar: The Last Airbender.

Katara is set to appear as a playable character via downloadable content in Sonic Racing: CrossWorlds.

== Reception ==
Hannah Grimes of Comic Book Resources stated that Katara is "rather mature and level-headed" compared to others in Team Avatar, and a "strong addition" for the Team. Rachel Sandell of Collider argued that Katara had one of the "best character arcs" in Avatar: The Last Airbender and a female protagonist not afraid to "admit areas in which she can grow". Tasha Robinson of Syfy has praised Katara's character as "smart, capable" but has also stated that she is "almost a generic anime heroine". While reception toward Katara's character has been largely positive, her romantic relationship with Aang has been criticized. Rachelle Hampton of Slate wrote, "For most of the show, Katara is like a mother towards Aang", "The romantic pining is almost entirely one-sided up until that very last scene", and "Katara’s ambivalence aside, that she and Aang end up together is [a] weirdly retrogressive message to send, as though she’s a prize for his persistence and heroism". Tom Russell of Screen Rant described the romance between Aang and Katara as "the show’s most underwhelming arc," which "lacked the nuance and care seen in the rest of the series" and "undermined Katara's character".

== Family tree ==
Water Tribe–Air Nomad family trees

Hakoda's father	Kanna	Pakku
Hakoda	Kya	Avatar Cycle (Note: Aang and Korra are both parts of Avatar Cycle of reincarnation, with Korra immediately following Aang.)
Sokka	Katara	Avatar Aang	Korra's grandparents
Bumi	Kya	Pema	Tenzin	Senna	Tonraq	Unalaq	Malina
Jinora	Ikki	Meelo	Rohan	Avatar Korra	Desna	Eska

Color key:
Color	Description
	Water Tribe and Waterbenders
	Air Nomads, Air Acolytes, and Airbenders
