= Tenzin (The Legend of Korra) =

Fictional character in The Legend of Korra

- Avatar Legends character
- Tenzin in The Legend of Korra.
- First appearance: "Welcome to Republic City" (2012)
- Created by: Michael Dante DiMartino; Bryan Konietzko
- Voiced by: J. K. Simmons

In-universe information
- Gender: Male
- Occupation: Spiritual mentor; Councilman for United Republic of Nations (Book 1); Leader of Air Nomads/Air Nation (Book 2–)
- Family: Aang (father); Katara (mother); Sokka (maternal uncle); Bumi (brother); Kya II (sister)
- Spouses: Pema (wife)
- Significant other: Lin Beifong (ex-girlfriend)
- Children: Jinora (daughter); Ikki (daughter); Meelo (son); Rohan (son)
- Relatives: Sokka (maternal uncle; deceased); Hakoda (maternal grandfather; deceased); Kya (maternal grandmother; deceased); Kanna (maternal great-grandmother; deceased); Pakku (maternal step-great-grandfather; deceased)
- Nationality: United Republic of Nations; Air Nomad/Water Tribe
- Bending element: Airbending
- Age: 51 in Book One; 52 in Book Two and Three; 55 in Book Four

Tenzin is a major character in Nickelodeon's animated television series The Legend of Korra, which aired from 2012 to 2014. He is part of the Avatar: The Last Airbender world. The character and the series, a sequel to Avatar: The Last Airbender, were created by Michael Dante DiMartino and Bryan Konietzko. He is voiced by J. K. Simmons. Tenzin's father, Aang, was the Avatar who preceded Korra and kept world peace by preventing the Fire Nation from taking over the world during the Hundred Year War, which occurred about seventy years before the beginning of The Legend of Korra. Tenzin's mother, Katara, greatly assisted Aang in his efforts to save the Earth Kingdom from destruction. Tenzin is the youngest of the three children of Aang and Katara.

Tenzin received a generally positive critical reception, with his role as Korra's mentor compared to Iroh's relationship with Zuko in the series' predecessor and Luke Skywalker's relationship with Yoda in the film The Empire Strikes Back.

== Character overview ==
Tenzin is a lead character in the series, serving as Korra's airbending master and spiritual mentor. He is the son of Aang and Katara. As the only airbender to be born in over a hundred years, Tenzin was taught the traditions and customs of the Air Nomads by his father, eventually earning the traditional Air Nomad tattoos. Tenzin inherited most of his father's mementos prior to his father's death. After Korra (who would eventually become Tenzin's student) was revealed at a very young age as the new Avatar, Tenzin, along with Sokka, Zuko, and Korra's father, Tonraq, thwarted an attempt to kidnap the child. The kidnappers, led by Zaheer, were apprehended and imprisoned. Because of this threat and the potential for future threats, Tenzin and Tonraq elected to move Korra to a compound at the Southern Water Tribe where she could live and train in safety.

Tenzin has a longstanding friendship with Lin Beifong, who is the daughter of Toph Beifong, and at one point the two characters were romantically involved. Tenzin offered her comfort and a higher level of trust was reached between the two. However, their romantic relationship deteriorated, partially because Tenzin wanted children while Lin did not and because of Lin's abrasive nature. It was during this time that Pema, who was an acolyte of the Air Nation, approached Tenzin and confessed her feelings for him. This indirectly led to the end of Tenzin's romantic relationship with Lin and the beginning of his relationship with Pema. The two eventually married, and would have four children: Jinora, Ikki, Meelo and Rohan.

In stark contrast to his father Aang, and his siblings Bumi and Kya, Tenzin is described as a stern and serious character. The character does possess a sense of humor which he shows at times. Tenzin projects a calm demeanor, but can be flustered by perceived foolishness or madness. The character is also characterized as prideful, particularly when it comes to addressing his shortcomings. Tenzin is also described as an authoritarian and traditionalist, though he has shown openness in breaking with tradition. Tenzin owns a flying bison named Oogi, a descendant of the group of flying bison discovered by Avatar Aang after the species was presumed extinct following the air nomad genocide.

== Creation and conception ==
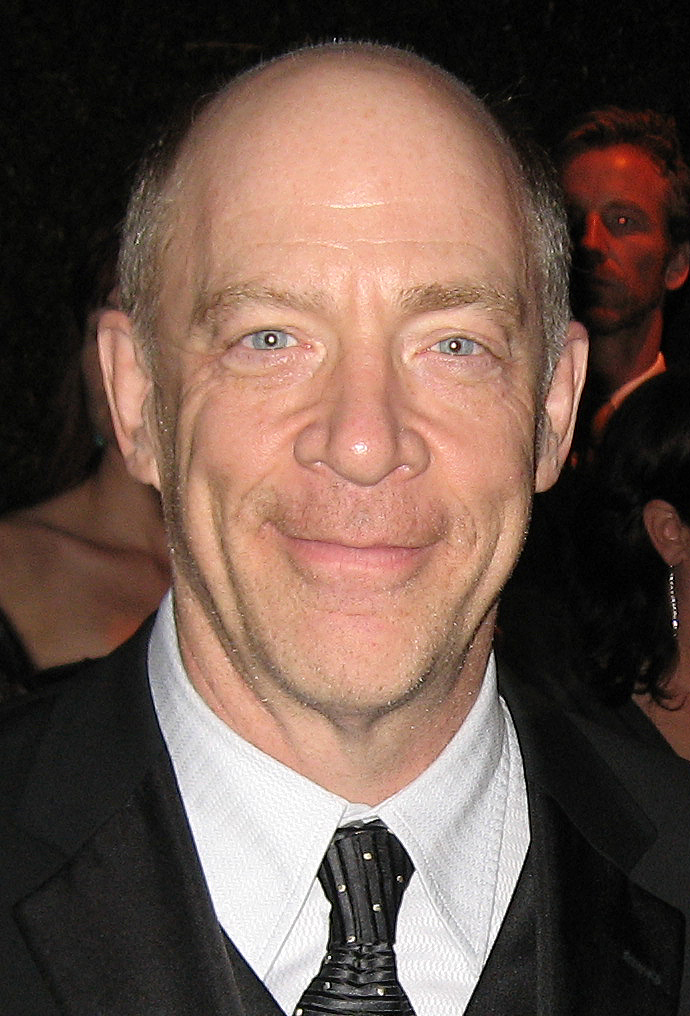
J. K. Simmons voices Tenzin.

Tenzin was envisioned to link The Legend of Korra with the series’ prequel, Avatar: The Last Airbender. Tenzin is one of three major characters in The Legend of Korra (Korra and Lin Beifong being the other two) who has a direct association with major characters in Avatar: The Last Airbender. Aang and Katara are the character's parents, while Sokka is his uncle. Tenzin was also envisaged to carry on his father Aang's legacy and to serve as a spiritual mentor to the new Avatar, Korra. His clothing, which is similar to Avatar Aang's, was designed to reflect his heritage as both an Air Nomad and as the previous Avatar's son.

Tenzin's siblings, Kya and Bumi, were originally intended to be airbenders as well. However this was later revised, with Kya reworked as a waterbender and Bumi initially a non-bender. Tenzin's design was very difficult to keep consistent as the animators had difficulty with consistently drawing the character's nose correctly. At the time of the series's initial production in 2011 the reigning Dalai Lama's name was Tenzin Gyatso, who also served as the inspiration for Aang's surrogate father when he was an Air Nomad, Monk Gyatso.

Tenzin was beaten profusely in the season three finale, causing some fans to believe the character had been killed, only for him to later be revealed alive. Series co-creator Michael Dante DiMartino stated that he and Bryan Konietzko never talked of killing the character off. Konietzko explained the reason the "full beatdown" was not seen was because it could not be shown and attributed fans thinking the character would die to the death of the Earth Queen earlier in the season.

== Appearances ==
=== The Legend of Korra television series ===
Tenzin (foreground), Pema (rear right) and three of their four children: Meelo (son, center above Tenzin), Jinora (daughter, rear left) and Ikki (daughter, rear center).

==== Book One: Air (2012) ====
A portrait of Tenzin's parents and siblings. Clockwise from top left: Aang, Katara, Tenzin, Kya and Bumi

In Book One, after a teenaged Korra successfully completed her training in the other three elements, Tenzin took her on as his pupil and trained her in the art of airbending and in spiritual matters. Korra left her home and moved in with Tenzin's residence on Air Temple Island, which is part of Republic City. Initially, the training sessions went poorly with the master and pupil arguing frequently. However, after Korra was incapacitated and nearly rendered powerless by Amon, the leader of a subversive movement who specialized in taking away the bending abilities of people, she revealed to Tenzin her deep-seated fears of Amon, crying on Tenzin's shoulder. Tenzin offered her comfort and a higher level of trust was established between the two. Later when Republic City came under attack from Amon's forces, Tenzin, his wife and their children were ultimately captured by Amon and were facing the real prospect of losing their bending when they were rescued by Korra and Mako. Korra would subsequently lose most of her bending abilities. After Korra regained her bending and restored Lin's earthbending through energybending, Tenzin told her "I am so proud of you, Avatar Korra."

==== Book Two: Spirits (2013) ====
In Book Two, Tenzin's relationship with Korra would once again be strained with Korra effectively dismissing Tenzin as her spiritual mentor, replacing him with her uncle Unalaq. While she chose to remain at the South Pole, he left for the Southern Air Temple with his family and siblings, Bumi and Kya. While at the Southern Air Temple, Tenzin, Bumi and Kya would discuss past familial conflicts and eventually find closure to past hurts and slights. Tenzin would eventually reunite with Korra, with the latter restoring the former as her spiritual mentor. Later when his daughter Jinora's soul was trapped in the Spirit World by Unalaq, who was revealed as a villain, Tenzin and his allies set out toward the South Pole to enter the Spirit World through the spirit portal there. In the Spirit World, Tenzin would encounter his father Aang's spirit. When Tenzin shared with Aang that he felt he was failure in following his father's footsteps, Aang encouraged Tenzin to be himself and not try to be someone else. Tenzin, encouraged by this would eventually find Jinora's soul in the Spirit World. During Harmonic Convergence (a moment where all the planets in the Solar System aligned perfectly), after Tenzin learned that Raava had been destroyed, severing Korra's connection to her past lives, he helped Korra learn how to bend her own spirit and fight Unalaq, who at this point was consumed by Vaatu and became the "Dark Avatar". Tenzin and others successfully defended Korra's body against countless evil spirits while her spiritual essence was locked in battle against the "Dark Avatar" until she returned. Korra, with the help of Jinora, emerged victorious.

==== Book Three: Change (2014) ====
Book Three saw the rebirth of the Air Nation. Many non-benders, including Tenzin's brother Bumi, suddenly acquired the art of airbending. Tenzin along with Korra, Asami Sato, Mako, Bolin and Bumi would go on a quest to recruit the new airbenders to rebuild the Air Nation. Initially the effort was met with limited success with only an orphan boy named Kai joining the Air Nation. However at the Earth Kingdom capital of Ba Sing Se, the group discovered that a number of airbenders were imprisoned by the Earth Queen. The group would successfully liberate the captive airbenders who all agreed to join the Air Nation. At the Northern Air Temple, Tenzin attempted to impart cultural knowledge to his pupils, but they generally showed little interest in learning about Air Nomad culture. The group would soon be joined by Ikki, Meelo, Pema, Kya and other airbenders who made the lengthy trek from Air Temple Island. Tenzin began to employ military-style training on his new recruits as well as Bumi, who was the one who suggested that Tenzin needed to employ harsher training methods if he was to become a successful teacher. Initially, the recruits did not respond favorably to his strict regimen. Later the training would pay off as his students, led by Bumi, were able to fend off a group of earthbending rustlers who were illegally capturing the Air Bison in the area. Subsequently, Zaheer and his allies arrived at the Northern Air Temple. After Zaheer revealed that he planned to capture the Air Nation and use them as leverage against Korra; Tenzin, along Bumi and Kya engaged in a battle with Zaheer, Ghazan, Ming-Hua and P'li in a desperate attempt to protect the rest of his family and his students. In his duel with Zaheer, Tenzin gained the upper hand. Soon however the tide of the battle turned when Ghazan and Ming-Hua joined the fight, the two having handily beaten Tenzin's siblings. P'li would subsequently join the fight. Despite being badly outnumbered, Tenzin fought valiantly, refusing to yield. He was eventually overcome by the four, sustaining severe injuries in the battle. The four took all the residents of the Northern Air Temple as prisoner, save Kai who was thought dead, but ultimately survived. Tenzin was essentially incapacitated for the rest of his time at the Northern Air Temple. He was eventually rescued by Asami, Bolin and Mako. Weeks later, a fully recuperated Tenzin presided over Jinora's ceremony, installing her as an airbending master. He announced that while Korra, who sustained serious injuries in her brutal fight with Zaheer, recuperated, the Air Nation would assist in restoring peace and balance to the world, essentially taking over the Avatar's role.

==== Book Four: Balance (2014) ====
Book Four saw the Air Nation make good on Tenzin's promise to assist others. They primarily focused their efforts around the Earth Kingdom which had fallen into disarray after the murder of the Earth Queen. Tenzin, who in effect was the political head of the Air Nation, was present at Wu's coronation ceremony when Kuvira appointed herself as the leader of the new Earth Empire. Concerned about Kuvira's declarations, Tenzin and the world leaders convened after the coronation and agreed to send Suyin Beifong, Lin's half-sister, as their representative to speak with Kuvira and convince her to step down. However, Kuvira was unmoved, holding on to her position. Tenzin subsequently tasked his children with a mission to locate Korra, whose whereabouts at this point were unknown, and bring her to Republic City. The children would successfully complete their mission returning Korra back to Republic City. When Korra shared with Tenzin that she felt like a failure in being badly outclassed by Kuvira in a battle, Tenzin stated no one expected her to face the dictator alone and that it was everyone's responsibility to resolve the Kuvira crisis. Several days later, Tenzin attended a meeting to discuss the Republic City's evacuation process in the scenario that Kuvira attacked the city. The meeting was interrupted by Lin, Suyin, Zhu Li, and Bolin, the latter who informed him the existence of Kuvira's powerful cannon. When Zhu Li added that Kuvira planned to invade the city two weeks later, Tenzin returned to his family at Air Temple Island to encourage them to leave the city. Instead, Pema and his three eldest children elected to stay and assist in any way possible. Later, Tenzin was chosen by Korra to be part of a stealth airbender team tasked with kidnapping Kuvira's fiancé, Bataar Jr, with the intention of using him as a bargaining chip against Kuvira. Utilizing their wingsuits, they successfully acquired their target, dumping him in a large traveling bag and transporting him to their hideout. Tenzin stood by as Korra eventually managed to force Baatar Jr. to contact Kuvira to call off her attack. To everyone's surprise, Kuvira traced the radio signal back to their location and decided to destroy it with her cannon. Tenzin narrowly escaped certain death. Tenzin and his friends would eventually emerge victorious over Kuvira and her army. In the series denouement, Tenzin hosted and attended Varrick and Zhu Li's wedding ceremony on Air Temple Island. Outside the after-party, Tenzin engaged in a conversation with the Avatar. Tenzin complimented his pupil noting that she transformed the world more in the few years than most of her predecessors did in their lifetimes. Tenzin was pleased to hear Korra confide that she felt her journey had only begun and that she desired to learn and do more. The moment was interrupted by Asami, however, who informed him that Varrick desired to borrow a wingsuit and jump off a tower. Tenzin immediately ran off to stop Varrick.

=== The Legend of Korra comic series ===
==== Turf Wars (2017–2018) ====
In part one of Turf Wars, Tenzin and the Air Nation help out at the evacuee camp for people whose homes were destroyed in Kuvira's assault. Upon Korra and Asami's return from the Spirit World, Tenzin fills them in on the situation at the camp. Tenzin notes that President Raiko was too preoccupied with his re-election to help the evacuees. Tenzin then accompanies Korra when she goes to reassure the evacuees and lift their spirits.

==== Ruins of the Empire (2019–2020) ====
In part one and three of Ruins of the Empire, Tenzin makes a cameo appearance as an attendant of Kuvira's trial.

== Airbending and special skills ==
"Notice that the stiffest tree is most easily cracked, while the bamboo or willow survives by bending with the wind."

— Master Tenzin (The Legend of Korra)

Tenzin is highly skilled in Airbending which utilizes aikido and the Chinese martial arts techniques of baguazhang and xingyiquan. The series' creators consulted a professional martial artist in the design of the show's fighting style. Airbending represents the element of freedom, and is categorized as the most elusive of the "four bending arts". Airbending involves "smooth coiling and uncoiling actions"; dynamic footwork, throws, and open-handed techniques; and swift, evasive maneuvers designed to evoke the "intangibility and explosive power of wind". These techniques are intended to increase the difficulty for opponents to attack directly or land a lethal blow—allowing airbenders to defend themselves while also protecting their attacker from injury—a pacifist-philosophy that is prevalent among the Air Nomad people.

== Reception ==
Tenzin was generally received well by the media and fans. As Korra's mentor, Tenzin's relationship with Korra has drawn comparisons with both Iroh's relationship with Zuko in the series' predecessor, Avatar the Last Airbender and Luke Skywalker's relationship with Yoda in the film The Empire Strikes Back. The depiction of Tenzin's struggles to establish his own identity outside of his father Aang also received positive reviews, praised as adding depth to the character. The portrayal of the character's complicated relationship with his siblings was also well-received, with reviewer Keval Shah noting that the depiction not only further developed the character, but helped make Tenzin a more likeable figure. Reviewer Noel Kirkpatrick conceded that while the depiction of the relationship between the siblings was not the most interesting part of the show, it was “refreshing to see that these three middle-to late-middle-aged adults on a show aimed at kids have problems, too—problems that younger audiences can grasp and relate to, but that still ring true for older audiences who have siblings.” Tenzin's stint as the teacher of the Air Nation at the Northern Air Temple drew comparisons with Hogwarts from the Harry Potter series with Tenzin being compared to both Minerva McGonagall and Severus Snape. Voice Actor J.K. Simmons has drawn praise for his work in portraying the sometimes contradictory nature of Tenzin's character. Tenzin, Kya and Bumi's battle with the Red Lotus has been described as one of the best scenes in Book Three. There was some angst among fans over the fate of Tenzin when it was not immediately clear whether Tenzin survived his battle with Zaheer and the rest of the Red Lotus gang, as Tenzin stubbornly refused to surrender despite being badly outnumbered.

Tenzin did receive criticism for at times not being a progressive enough character. For example, his support of the succession of King Wu to the throne of the Earth Kingdom, maintaining that nation's monarchy, drew some criticism. Additionally, criticism was leveled at the show's creators for not having enough Tenzin appearances in Book Four, despite him being a major protagonist.

== Family tree ==
Water Tribe–Air Nomad family trees

Hakoda's father	Kanna	Pakku
Hakoda	Kya	Avatar Cycle (Note: Aang and Korra are both parts of Avatar Cycle of reincarnation, with Korra immediately following Aang.)
Sokka	Katara	Avatar Aang	Korra's grandparents
Bumi	Kya	Pema	Tenzin	Senna	Tonraq	Unalaq	Malina
Jinora	Ikki	Meelo	Rohan	Avatar Korra	Desna	Eska

Color key:
Color	Description
	Water Tribe and Waterbenders
	Air Nomads, Air Acolytes, and Airbenders
