= Bolin (The Legend of Korra) =

Character in The Legend of Korra

- Avatar Legends character
- Bolin in The Legend of Korra.
- First appearance: "A Leaf in the Wind" (2012)
- Created by: Michael Dante DiMartino; Bryan Konietzko
- Designed by: Michael Dante DiMartino; Bryan Konietzko
- Voiced by: P. J. Byrne (The Legend of Korra)

In-universe information
- Gender: Male
- Occupation: Pro-bender (seasons 1-2); Actor (season 2); Soldier (Season 4); Police officer (Turf Wars)
- Family: San (father; deceased); Naoki (mother; deceased); Mako (brother); Chow (paternal uncle); LiLing (paternal aunt); Chow Jr. (paternal cousin); Tu (paternal cousin); Meng-Meng (paternal cousin); Yin (paternal grandmother); Bohai (paternal grandfather; presumably deceased)
- Significant others: Opal (girlfriend, Seasons 3-4); Eska (ex-girlfriend, ex-fiancée, Season 2)
- Relatives: Chow (paternal uncle); LiLing (aunt); Chow Jr. (first cousin); Tu (first cousin); Meng-Meng (first cousin); Grandfamily: Bohai (paternal grandfather); Yin (paternal grandmother)
- Nationality: United Republic of Nations; Earth Kingdom; Fire Nation
- Bending element: Primary: Earthbending; Sub-styles: Lavabending
- Age: 16 (Book One); 17 (Books 2-3); 20 (Book 4)

Bolin (博林, Bó Lín) is a major fictional character in Nickelodeon's animated television series The Legend of Korra, which aired from 2012 to 2014. He is part of the Avatar: The Last Airbender world. The character and the series, a sequel to Avatar: The Last Airbender, were created by Michael Dante DiMartino and Bryan Konietzko. He is voiced by P. J. Byrne. Bolin is able to manipulate the classical element of earth, which is known as earthbending. It is revealed in the third season that he is also able to create and control lava, which is a very rare sub-ability called lavabending.

== Character overview ==
Bolin (博林, in in-universe orthography) is an earthbender from a multicultural family who grew up on the streets of Republic City as an orphan with his older brother, Mako. As an earthbender, Bolin has the ability to move and shape earth at will. However, he knows a rare subset of earthbending called lavabending, allowing him to manipulate lava, turning it into earth and back. As a friend of Avatar Korra, the character often plays the role of comic relief within The Legend of Korra, taking over Sokka's role in Avatar: The Last Airbender. Bolin is characterized as being somewhat dimwitted, but having a "heart of gold." His enthusiastic personality led him to becoming an actor. Furthermore, much like Sokka, Bolin has had relationships with various young female characters within the show.

== Creation and conception ==
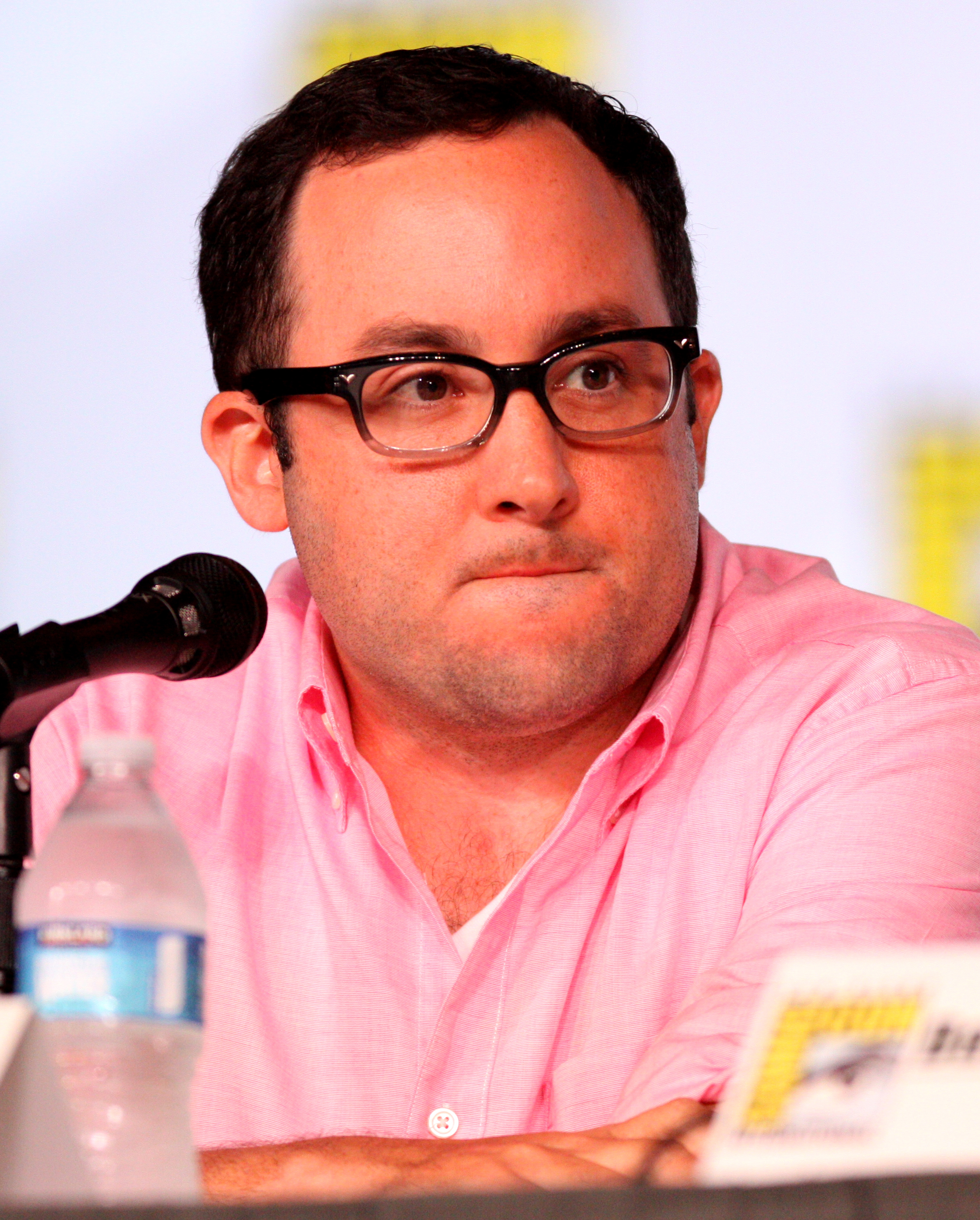
P.J. Byrne voices Bolin.

According to Bryan Konietzko, Bolin's character was inspired by the original concept of Toph Beifong, who was going to be a male character Konietzko described as "kind of a big, not sharpest tool in the shed." When Toph's character was decided to be a smaller girl, the creators still had many ideas for the male earthbender, which they implemented into Bolin.

Bolin along with his older brother Mako were designed by Ryu Ki-Hyun. The character went through a series of design changes in its development. Joaquim Dos Santos originally wanted both characters to have strong noses, however the idea was nixed. It was decided that as the younger brother, Bolin's character would have a somewhat simplistic and naive view of the world, while Mako's character as the older brother and provider for the two, would be more cynical and serious in nature.

Bolin and Mako live in Republic City, a “modern metropolis” in the United Republic. According to the creators, the United Republic was founded by Aang and Zuko after the Hundred Year War as a place where benders and non-Benders from all four Kingdoms could live in harmony. Mako and Bolin were created in part to highlight the radical changes that had occurred in the seventy years since the end of the war, specifically the ethnic diversity and blending of cultures of the various nations in the United Republic. The two are the sons of an Earth Kingdom father and a Fire Nation mother. Because of the heritages of their parents, Bolin is an earthbender and Mako is a firebender.

=== Voice actor ===
Bolin is voiced by P.J. Byrne. Byrne related to the character as he explained, "I'm a people person, I'm a peoplely people, and I think that's what my character is." Fellow The Legend of Korra voice actor David Faustino, who voiced Mako, said during the show's run that while they were all given "some freedom", Byrne especially as he was "sort of the comic relief of the show" and that much of his material was improv which would either be kept or cut depending on how it was received.

== Appearances ==
=== The Legend of Korra television series ===
==== Book One: Air ====
In the first season, Bolin was initially infatuated with Korra. He befriended her showing her pro-bending tricks. When the team needed to come up with thirty thousand yuans to enter the pro-bending Championship, Bolin accepted Shady Shin's offer to work for the local criminal underworld. He along with four triad members was kidnapped and taken before Amon, leader of the Equalists, a revolutionary movement dedicated to removing bending from all benders. Bolin was rescued by Mako and Korra. Bolin would take Korra on a date, although his feelings were unrequited. Later Amon and his Equalists destroyed the pro-bending arena, leaving Bolin and Mako homeless. Asami offered them a place to stay. However, after Hiroshi Sato was revealed as an Equalist, the brothers and Asami moved to Air Temple Island with Korra. After Bolin and his brother were arrested for allegedly interfering with police activities, Lin Beifong freed the two, who informed them that Korra was kidnapped. After finding Korra, Amon launched a large-scale attack on the city. "Team Avatar" (Korra, Mako, Bolin and Asami) was forced to retreat into the tunnel system of the city, where they would await the arrival of reinforcements. After the reinforcements were overwhelmed by the Equalists biplanes, the team split up, and Bolin accompanied Asami to an Equalist airfield in order to stop the planes from flying. They would eventually destroy the airfield capturing Hiroshi Sato in the process.

==== Book Two: Spirits ====
In the second season, after the Anti-bending Revolution, Bolin accompanied Team Avatar to the Southern Water Tribe. He became romantically involved with Korra's cousin, Eska, a macabrely domineering princess from the Northern Water Tribe, who was visiting her southern counterparts. Bolin soon found the relationship borderline abusive and intended to break up with the princess. However, when he tried to do so, Eska engaged herself to him. Bolin secretly left the Southern Water Tribe for Republic City, avoiding an angered and deranged Eska in the process. Later, Bolin was cast to play Nuktuk, the male lead in the businessman Varrick's film The Adventures of Nuktuk: Hero of the South. The movie was a success and Bolin enjoyed fame and fortune. On the night of the final screening of the film, Bolin thwarted a kidnapping of President Raiko. Despite being outnumbered by the would-be kidnappers, Bolin overpowered them. He forced one of them to reveal who his employer was, thus exposing Varrick's duplicity. Later Bolin rejoined Team Avatar at the South Pole. At the end of Season 2, Bolin assisted in the efforts to keep a multitude of evil spirits away from Korra's meditating body in the Tree of Time while the Avatar defeated the Dark Avatar. Bolin had an unlikely ally in this effort in Eska and at one point admitted his love for the princess, who in turn kissed him. Before they were completely overrun by the evil spirits, Korra's returning spirit nullified the threat. After the crisis ended, Bolin suggested to Eska that she live with him at Republic City. However, Eska declined, confessing that she was only caught up in the moment when she kissed him. She told Bolin that he would have a special place "in the organ that pumps [her] blood".

==== Book Three: Change ====
In the third season, Bolin would accompany Team Avatar as well as Tenzin and Bumi, in their quest to find new airbenders in the Earth Kingdom to help recreate the Air Nation. Initially they enjoyed limited success. However at the Earth Kingdom capital of Ba Sing Se, the group discovered that a number of airbenders were imprisoned by the Earth Queen. While in the capital Mako and Bolin reunited with their extended family, who resided in the city. The group would successfully liberate the captive airbenders who all agreed to join the Air Nation. Team Avatar traveled to the Earth Kingdom city of Zaofu to recruit one more known airbender, Lin Beifong's niece Opal. When Bolin met Opal, the two almost immediately fell in love, beginning a romantic relationship. Opal agreed to join the Air Nation, and departed Zaofu to join the nascent Air Nation at the Northern Air Temple. Later Bolin and Mako would find themselves locked in the first of a series of battles with Zaheer's Red Lotus allies Ming-Hua and Ghazan. The earthbender was routed by Ghazan and the brothers were captured. The brothers were transported to Ba Sing Se, where there was a bounty on the two for aiding the airbenders' escape, and incarcerated. After Zaheer murdered the Earth Queen, ushering a period of anarchy in the capital, Zaheer allowed every prisoner to escape except Bolin and Mako. Zaheer informed the two that they would be freed, but only after they agreed to relay a message to Korra. The two commandeered an airship and subsequently rescued their extended family from their burning house. They reunited with Korra and Asami where Mako relayed Zaheer's message to Korra: Zaheer and other members of the Red Lotus planned to travel to the Northern Air Temple to eliminate the Air Nation unless Korra surrendered to him. The Avatar agreed to surrender to the Red Lotus in exchange for the Air Nation, who were being held captive by the Red Lotus. When it became apparent that the Red Lotus double-crossed the group; Bolin and Mako attempted to battle Ghazan and Ming-Hua, but Ghazan utilized his lavabending to trap the brothers. Facing certain death in the collapsing temple which was being consumed by lava, Bolin miraculously discovered that he, like Ghazan, could lavabend. Coupled with the timely appearance of Kai on his baby bison, Lefty, the brothers were able to escape the doomed Northern Air Temple. Later the brothers would be locked in yet another battle with Ming-Hua and Ghazan, with Bolin once again battling Ghazan, this time in a cave. With Bolin utilizing his newly found lavabending abilities, the two were much more evenly matched. However, when Ghazan began to gain the upper hand Mako, having dispatched Ming-Hua, joined the fray. When it became apparent that Ghazan was no match for the two, the lavabender collapsed the entire cave on the three. Ghazan died in the process while the brothers safely escaped.

==== Book Four: Balance ====
Opal kissing Bolin on the cheek as a sign of forgiveness for his actions while working for Kuvira.

During the fourth season, Bolin began working to re-unite the Earth Kingdom under Kuvira, who would become the season's villain. During this season, he was stuck between being loyal to his boss or to his friends, where he believed that Kuvira was doing the right thing despite his friends trying to convince him otherwise. Later in the season, the character realized that Kuvira was going too far and escaped her control. By helping saving the family of his girlfriend Opal, Bolin regained her trust. After returning to Republic City, Bolin along with Lin, Suyin, and Zhu Li, interrupted a conference of President Raiko's, who was meeting with Korra, Prince Wu, Tenzin and Mako. Zhu Li informed everyone that Kuvira planned to attack Republic City in two weeks. The President ordered the evacuation of Republic City while Bolin, along with the rest of team Avatar, decided to launch a preemptive strike against Kuvira in an attempt to destroy the dictator's superweapon. However their mission was unsuccessful, discovering the army was only hours away from Republic city, a week earlier than expected, They also were surprised that Kuvira mounted her superweapon on a 25-story tall robot, which she controlled through her metalbending. The team briefed their allies on Kuvira's progress. After Kuvira's army arrived in Republic City, Bolin took part in a plan to stop the large robot: the benders would relentlessly attack the robot to distract Kuvira while two hummingbird mecha suits would cut a circular hole in the machine without being crushed. A team would then enter the suit through the hole and ultimately destroy the massive machine from its inside. The plan was generally successful as he managed to enter inside the hole with Suyin, Lin, Mako, and Korra. In the process Bolin saved Mako from certain death, carrying his brother to safety after he found him unconscious in the engine room of the crumbling machine. In the series' end, Bolin would preside over Varrick (who he befriended in Season Four) and Zhu Li's wedding at Air Temple Island.

=== The Legend of Korra comic series ===
==== Turf Wars ====
In part one of Turf Wars, Bolin is now a police officer on Chief Lin Beifong's triad task force, with Mako serving as his temporary partner. After breaking up a fight between the Triple Threat and the Creeping Crystal triads, Bolin and Mako arrest Two-Toed Ping. Bolin and Mako reunite with Korra and Asami, who have returned from their vacation in the Spirit World. The reunion is cut short when the Air Nomads are attacked by Triple Threats at the Spirit Portal. Bolin comes to Mako's rescue when he loses a fight with the Triple Threat's new leader, Tokuga, but Tokuga is able to get away. In the aftermath of the battle, Korra kisses Asami out of relief, leading to Bolin, Mako, Jinora and Opal discovering their relationship.

==== Ruins of the Empire ====
In part one of Ruins of the Empire, Bolin is now Secretary to the President of the United Republic.

=== In other media ===
Together with his brother Mako, Bolin starred in "Republic City Hustle", the first of three character-focused shorts Nickelodeon released in advance of the September premiere of the second season. In this short, a younger Mako and Bolin are shown living on the street, where they "enter the crime-ridden underworld of Republic City."

Bolin appears in The Legend of Korra: A New Era Begins as a playable character.

Bolin appears in The Legend of Korra books Revolution and Endgame, two novels that together adapt the first season of the series.

== Reception ==
Bolin was generally well received by press and fans alike. The character's backstory was commended, with the three part prequel to the series, "Republic City Hustle" praised for sensitively depicting Bolin and his brother's Mako difficult childhood. The depiction of the strong relationship between Mako and Bolin in the series also drew praise with the scene where Mako gives his grandmother his red scarf described as "an unbelievably powerful moment shared by [Mako], Bolin, and their family". Tor.com editor Moddicai Knode praised Bolin's role in the episode "Operation Beifong", seeing it as the start of his character arc. According to Knode, here Bolin finally became as good as a character as Sokka was in the original series. Knode states that it was clear from the start that Bolin was designed to be a similar character to that of Sokka, but he states that "you can't just provide a bit of comedic relief and call yourself the Sokka of the group." Knode claims that to be "the Sokka of the group," Bolin needed enough character growth, to be "the man with the plan" and, optionally, be the character with the most romantic development on the show. Knode praises how the character of Bolin makes bold, risky decisions while acknowledging when he makes a mistake, and that despite not being the "sharpest pencil in the box," he makes up for this by teamwork and "stepping up to the plate."

Matt Patches of ScreenCrush compared Bolin and Varrick's escape in the season four episode "Reunion" to the 2008 film Defiance, where the characters are "blasting their way through [enemies] as they survived in the woods." Patches enjoyed the comedy in the dialogue between Bolin and Varrick, but also comments that "there's a tremendous amount of moral insight too." Reviewer Michael Mammano of Den of Geek also praised Bolin's role in this episode, pointing out the "sense of authority and competence he's developed" and noting that he is "far more poised and precise" than in previous seasons. P.J. Byrne also drew praise for his frenetic voicework, with reviewer Oliver Sava noting that Byrne's performance helped convincingly reflect the character's occasionally "chaotic" mindset.

Bolin's relationship with "ice princess" Eska during season two has been criticized for playing an abusive relationship for laughs, with a scene where Eska forcefully separates Bolin and his friend Korra being brought up often as an example.

Following the conclusion of the series, reviewer William Cannon of the Latin Times listed a number of characters from The Legend of Korra series who he felt would be suitable to have the lead role in a spin-off series. Bolin and Mako as co-leads made his list, with the reviewer commenting that "the funny awkward brother and the more serious brooding bro" would make "sitcom magic". Cannon felt that the two brothers had the best chemistry on The Legend of Korra. He also believed the fact that the two characters were "powerful benders" would make the spin-off series interesting. In response to Cannon's article, Adam Bellotto of Venture Capital Post was more reserved in his assessment of Bolin and Mako co-starring in a spin-off series. While he agreed with Cannon that a spin-off series focusing on the brothers would work well, Bellotto felt that such a series would be unoriginal. He held that either a new character or an underdeveloped character from the series was most appropriate to star in a spin-off.
