= Mako (The Legend of Korra) =

Character from The Legend of Korra

- Avatar Legends character
- Mako in The Legend of Korra.
- First appearance: "A Leaf in the Wind" (2012)
- Created by: Michael Dante DiMartino; Bryan Konietzko
- Voiced by: David Faustino

In-universe information
- Full name: Mako
- Species: Human
- Gender: Male
- Occupation: Pro-bender (season 1); Police officer (seasons 2-3, Turf Wars); Bodyguard (season 4)
- Family: San (father; deceased); Naoki (mother; deceased); Bolin (brother)
- Significant others: Korra (ex-girlfriend, seasons 1-2); Asami Sato (ex-girlfriend, season 1)
- Relatives: Chow (paternal uncle); LiLing (aunt); Chow Jr. (first cousin); Tu (first cousin); Meng-Meng (first cousin); Grandfamily: Bohai (paternal grandfather); Yin (paternal grandmother)
- Nationality: United Republic of Nations; Fire Nation; Earth Kingdom
- Bending element: Primary: Firebending; Sub-styles: Lightning creation
- Age: 18 (Book One); 19 (Books 2-3); 22 (Book Four, Turf Wars)
- Hair color: Black
- Eye color: Gold

Mako (Chinese: 馬高, 馬科; pinyin: Mǎ Gāo, Mǎ Kē) is a major character in Nickelodeon's animated television series The Legend of Korra, which aired from 2012 to 2014. He is part of the Avatar: The Last Airbender world. The character and the series, a sequel to Avatar: The Last Airbender, were created by Michael Dante DiMartino and Bryan Konietzko. He is voiced by David Faustino. Because he is a firebender, Mako is able to create and manipulate the classical element of fire. Mako also has the ability to both generate and redirect lightning. The character is named in honor of the late Mako Iwamatsu who voiced Iroh, a major supporting character, in the first two seasons of Avatar: The Last Airbender.

== Character overview ==
Mako is a talented firebender from a multicultural family who grew up on the streets of Republic City as an orphan with his younger brother, Bolin. In sharp contrast to his brother, Mako's personality can best be characterized as stoic and brooding. Living on the streets has given him a "rough-edge", though he relaxes somewhat when he's with his friends. Mako is also described as being outspoken, generally not afraid to share his opinions with others. He's also characterized as smart and a dedicated worker who at times puts his career before anything else. Additionally, Mako is very guarded in his dealings with strangers, lacking the naivety of his brother. For roughly 1/2 of the series' run, Mako wore a signature red scarf that was once his father San's, who was murdered along with his mother when he was eight years old.

Mako formed a pro-bending team with his brother, dreaming that it would bring him fame and fortune. However, his aspirations changed when he met Avatar Korra, who joined the team and became a loyal friend. In the following months, Mako joined the Republic City Police Force, where he steadily rose in rank from a beat cop to a detective. He joined his friends, including Korra, on numerous occasions in stopping various global threats. Mako was later appointed as Prince Wu's bodyguard, a position he continued after the latter's coronation as Earth King. Mako eventually returns to his detective job as his exes, Asami Sato and Avatar Korra end up together.

== Creation and conception ==
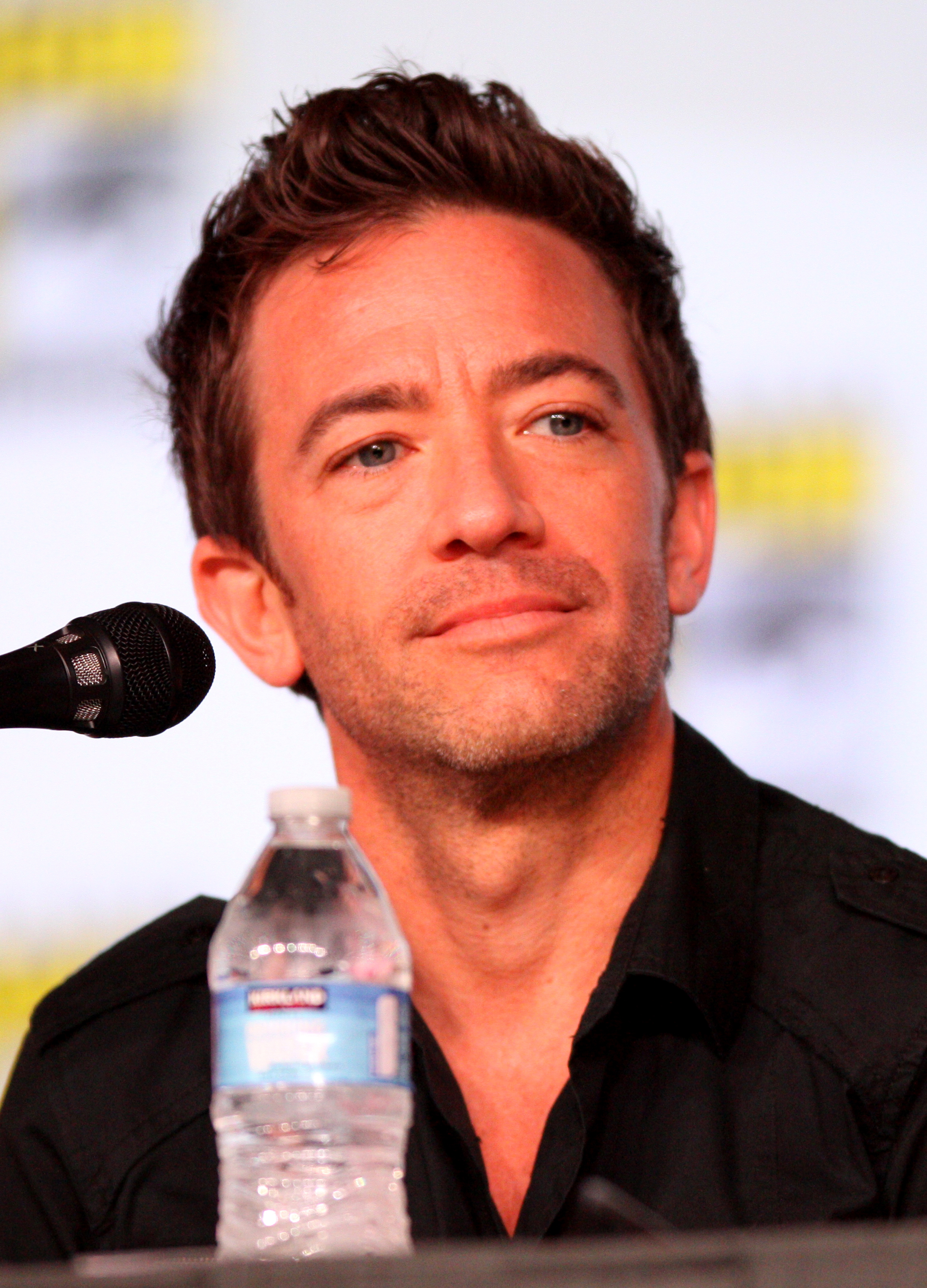
David Faustino voices Mako.

Mako along with his brother Bolin were designed by Ryu Ki-Hyun. Mako went through a number of design changes. Joaquim Dos Santos originally wanted both characters to have strong noses, however the idea was nixed. It was decided that as the younger brother, Bolin's character would have a somewhat simplistic and naive view of the world, while Mako's character as the older brother and provider for the two, would be more reserved, brooding and serious in nature.

Mako and Bolin live in Republic City a "modern metropolis" in the United Republic. According to the creators, the United Republic was founded by Aang and Zuko after the Hundred Year War as a place where benders and non-Benders from all four Kingdoms could live in harmony. Mako and Bolin were created in part to highlight the radical changes that had occurred in the seventy years since the end of the war, specifically the ethnic diversity and blending of cultures of the various nations in the United Republic. Mako and Bolin are the sons of an Earth Kingdom father and a Fire Nation mother. Because of the heritages of their parents, Mako is a firebender and Bolin is an earthbender.

Toza teaching Mako pro-bending as well as Mako learning lightning techniques from Lightning Bolt Zolt were cut from the series to save time. During production of the second season, wherein Mako becomes an officer in Republic City, the design for his police uniform went through several concepts before its final design was settled on, all of which having his trademark red scarf tucked into his jacket. Bryan Konietzko made the decision to have it removed. Though Joaquim Dos Santos was initially supportive of the scarf being implemented, he left open to the idea that a police officer having on scarf while showing up to a crime spree would be "strange".

Of the core members of Team Avatar in The Legend of Korra, Mako was the only one to remain single by the end of the series. He was originally intended to become romantically involved with Fire Lord Izumi's daughter during the fourth season, but the idea was scrapped as the writers felt there were too many characters in the season.

=== Voice ===
Mako is voiced by David Faustino. Faustino felt Mako's love for Asami was different than the love he had for Korra, calling it "much deeper". Faustino was supportive of the romantic relationship between Mako and Korra being reestablished during the fourth season.

== Appearances ==
=== The Legend of Korra television series ===
==== Book One: Air ====
At the beginning of the series, Mako is a member of the Fire Ferrets pro-bending team, alongside his brother and the waterbender Hasook. He initially does not get along well with Korra, mistaking her for one of Bolin's "fangirls" when they first meet, but later befriends her when she joins the Fire Ferrets after Hasook did not show up for a match. Mako later starts dating Asami Sato, the daughter of wealthy industrialist and Fire Ferrets sponsor Hiroshi Sato. Following the Equalists' attack on the Pro-Bending arena, Mako and Bolin moved in with Asami. Tensions between Korra and Mako again appeared when Korra began to suspect Hiroshi of being an Equalist, with Mako believing her to be acting on her jealousy towards Asami. After Korra's suspicions were proven to be true, he comforted the distraught Asami at the Avatar's urging. Mako – along with Asami and Bolin – later joined Korra in fighting the Equalists. The trio were subsequently arrested by Republic City Councilman Tarrlok, who wanted to use them as leverage against Korra. He, along with Asami and Bolin, were later freed by Lin Beifong after Tarrlok kidnapped Korra. During the crisis, Mako was very open about his feelings for Korra in front of Asami, leading to friction between the two of them. This was exacerbated when Asami found out about Mako and Korra's earlier kiss. Mako ended his relationship with Asami. Shortly, Mako and Korra later discovered that Amon, the leader of the Equalists, was a powerful bender and not the non-bender he claimed to be. They eventually exposed Amon, ending the revolution, but in the process Korra lost much of her bending. When Korra traveled to the South Pole to receive treatment from Katara, Mako accompanied her confessing his love for her while there. After Korra bending was restored by Aang, the two of them embraced and kissed, with Korra admitting her love for Mako.

==== Book Two: Spirits ====
By the second season, Mako has become a police officer for the Republic City Police Force. When a cultural center associated with the Southern Water Tribe was bombed, most suspected that the Northern Water Tribe was involved. However, Mako was one of the few who doubted that the Northern Water Tribe was the culprit. This brought him into sharp conflict with Korra, a native of the Southern Water Tribe. Once Mako revealed Korra's plans to ask the United Forces fleet to help the Southern Water Tribe in their civil war with their northern counterparts to the president, Mako and Korra's romantic relationship abruptly ended in a bitter argument. Determined to find the true culprits of the bombing and help Asami's struggling company, Mako set up a sting operation with the help of a local triad. However, they were double-crossed by the gangsters. During the operation, Asami's company's warehouse was raided, effectively bankrupting her company. While consoling the distraught Asami, Asami kissed Mako. Mako continued his investigation and eventually grew suspicious of the businessman, Varrick. Before he could proceed in his investigation, incriminating evidence concerning the bombing of the Southern Water Tribe center was found in his apartment. Mako was subsequently arrested. After Varrick was arrested for the attempted kidnapping of President Raiko, Mako was released from prison. In his subsequent reunion with Korra, who through an encounter with an evil spirit forgot she broke up with Mako, Korra kissed Mako in front of Asami, Bolin, Tenzin, Lin, Bumi and Kya. To the chagrin of everyone present, Mako failed to remind Korra of their breakup and that he was dating Asami. This ended Mako's romantic involvement with Asami. At the end of Season 2, Mako assisted in the efforts to keep a multitude of dark spirits away from Korra's meditating body in the Tree of Time while the Avatar defeated the Dark Avatar. After the battle, Korra revealed to Mako that she sensed the two broke up before her encounter with the evil spirit and the two agreed to end their romantic involvement.

==== Book Three: Change ====
The third season saw Mako, now uneasy around his ex-girlfriends, accompanying the rest of Team Avatar, Tenzin and Bumi to the Earth Kingdom in their efforts to recruit new airbenders to recreate the Air Nation. Initially they enjoyed limited success as they were able to successfully recruit one person, Kai, a young orphan whose life was not unlike Mako's childhood. However at the Earth Kingdom capital of Ba Sing Se, the group discovered that a number of airbenders were imprisoned by the Earth Queen. The group would successfully liberate the captive airbenders who all agreed to join the Air Nation. While in the capital Mako and Bolin reunited with their extended family, who resided in the city. In an emotionally poignant moment, Mako elected to give his scarf, which was his murdered father's scarf, to his grandmother, believing his parents would have wanted her to have it. Later Mako and Bolin would find themselves locked in the first of a series of battles with Zaheer's Red Lotus allies Ming-Hua and Ghazan. The firebender fared poorly against Ming-Hua and the brothers were captured. The brothers were transported to Ba Sing Se, where there was a bounty on the two for aiding the airbenders' escape, and incarcerated. After Zaheer murdered the Earth Queen, ushering a period of anarchy in the capital, Zaheer allowed every prisoner to escape except Mako and Bolin. Zaheer informed the two that they would be freed, but only after they agreed to relay a message to Korra. The two commandeered an airship and subsequently rescued their extended family from their burning house. They reunited with Korra and Asami where Mako relayed Zaheer's message to Korra: Zaheer and other members of the Red Lotus planned to travel to the Northern Air Temple to eliminate the newly reborn Air Nation unless Korra surrendered to him. The Avatar agreed to surrender to the Red Lotus in exchange for the Air Nation, who were being held captive by the Red Lotus. When it became apparent that the Red Lotus double-crossed the group; Mako was able to radio Korra about the deception. He and Bolin attempted to battle Ghazan and Ming-Hua, but Ghazan utilized his lavabending to trap the brothers. Thanks to a miraculous act of lavabending from Bolin and the timely appearance of Kai on his baby bison, Lefty, they were able to escape the doomed Northern Air Temple. Later the brothers would be locked in yet another battle with Ming-Hua and Ghazan, with Mako once again battling Ming-Hua. Utilizing his lightning-bending abilities, Mako electrocuted Ming-Hua, killing the waterbender in the process. Mako then assisted Bolin who was engaged in battle with Ghazan at a cave. When it became apparent that Ghazan was no match for the two, the lavabender collapsed the entire cave on the three. Ghazan died in the process while the brothers safely escaped.

==== Book Four: Balance ====
The fourth season began with Mako appointed the bodyguard of Prince Wu, who was next in line for the Earth Kingdom throne. He spent a large amount of his time in this capacity, helping the young prince get through some turbulent times, particularly when Kuvira refused to hand power to Wu. Later, Mako reunited with Korra, who he had not seen in three years, and Asami. When the businesswoman revealed that she had been worried when Korra informed her that she could no longer go into the Avatar State, Mako asked when Korra had told her that. He inquired what was going on between them, learning that Korra had written to Asami during her absence. This annoyed Mako, who was miffed that he was kept out of the loop. After Wu was kidnapped, the three set out to rescue the prince. The three were successful in rescuing Wu, though in the process, Mako and Korra clashed repeatedly. When Asami remarked that their rescue mission reminded her of their old times, minus the "getting on each other's nerves part", Mako good-naturedly replied that arguing with Korra was normal for him. Wu would eventually be moved to the Asami's mansion, where he would share residence with Mako's extended family Later, Mako suggested that they "toughen up" the prince, so that he would be able to protect himself in the future. Soon however the conversation turned to Mako's past as he told Wu, his grandmother and his cousin Tu about his complicated romantic history with Korra and Asami. He was critiqued by the trio, with Tu making the observation that "...it seems like you're [Mako] so afraid to disappoint anyone that you end up disappointing everyone." Later when it was revealed that Kuvira's army had a large superweapon and also planned to invade Republic City, Mako, Korra, Bolin and Asami decided that they would attempt to destroy Kuvira's superweapon before it reached the city. However, they were unsuccessful in their attempts. After Kuvira's army arrived in Republic City, Mako took part in a plan to stop the large robot: the benders would relentlessly attack the robot to distract Kuvira while two hummingbird mecha suits would make an incision in the machine. A team would then enter Kuvira's machine through the hole and destroy the massive machine from its inside. The plan was generally successful as he managed to enter inside the hole with Suyin, Lin, Bolin, and Korra. Mako and Bolin entered the engine room in an attempt to demolish the engine. After defeating the soldiers, the two were unable to shut the engine down. Mako ordered Bolin to remove the cataleptic engineers and leave the room explaining that he planned to utilize his lightning-bending to destroy the engine room. Bolin realized that doing so could cost Mako his life and raised serious reservations. Mako brushed off Bolin's concerns and promised him that he would escape safely, telling him he loved him. In the process of implementing his plan Mako was struck by a bolt of energy, rendering him unconscious. He was saved by Bolin who had returned and carried Mako to relative safety. In the series' closing, Mako attended the wedding ceremony of Varrick and Zhu Li at Air Temple Island. Outside the wedding party, Mako and Korra had a conversation in which the latter thanked Mako for his help. Mako and Korra reaffirmed their close friendship.

=== The Legend of Korra comic series ===
==== Turf Wars ====
In part one of the graphic novel continuation of the series, Mako is now a police officer in Chief Lin Beifong's triad task force, with Bolin serving as his temporary partner. After breaking up a fight between the Triple Threat and the Creeping Crystal triads, Mako and Bolin arrest Two-Toed Ping and Mako tricks Ping into revealing the name of the Triple Threat's new leader. Mako and Bolin reunite with Korra and Asami, who have returned from their vacation in the Spirit World. The reunion is cut short when the Air Nomads are attacked by Triple Threats at the Spirit Portal. Mako goes after their leader Tokuga but loses the fight when Tokuga exploits Mako's injured arm. Bolin comes to Mako's rescue but Tokuga is able to get away. In the aftermath of the battle, Korra kisses Asami out of relief, leading to Mako, Bolin, Jinora and Opal discovering their relationship.

==== Ruins of the Empire ====
Mako accompanies Team Avatar to Gaoling when remnants of the Earth Empire arise. His arm is healed and out of the sling, though he now has burn scars.

=== In other media ===
Together with his brother Bolin, Mako starred in Republic City Hustle, the first of three character-focused shorts Nickelodeon released in advance of the September premiere of the second season. In this short, a younger Mako and Bolin are shown living on the street, where they "enter the crime-ridden underworld of Republic City."

Mako appears in The Legend of Korra books Revolution and Endgame, two novels that together adapt the first season of the series.

== Abilities ==
As a police officer, Mako uses a motorcycle as his vehicle of choice, displaying great skill with maneuvering it over slick terrain and even incorporating his firebending as a booster to extend the distance of his jumps and to stabilize after a near crash.

=== Firebending ===
Mako is highly skilled in Firebending which utilizes chinese martial arts techniques of changquan, Shaolin kung fu, Southern Dragon kung fu and xingyiquan. Firebending represents the element of power, and is categorized as the most aggressive of the "four bending arts". Firebending involves "external styles" that prioritize one's legwork (as opposed to the arms) and emphasizes "kicking over hand fighting"; the highly technical kicking strikes are meant to "extend as far as possible" without compromising balance. This is intended to sacrifice defence for optimized preemptive strikes and attrition warfare.

Mako implements "a modern hybrid-martial arts style of firebending" that he developed as a pro-bending athlete; which primarily involves a series of defensive weaving and dodging patterns quickly followed by successive spurts of offense. This technique compensates for firebending's inherent lack of defence; rendering Mako capable of defeating an entire pro-bending team by himself. Outside of pro-bending, Mako demonstrated great skill in traditional firebending combat. The raw strength of his firebending is considerable, as he is able to offset a large and point-blank explosion unharmed.

==== Lightning generation ====
Mako is skilled enough to generate lightning and redirect it, having learned the skills from his former boss, Lightning Bolt Zolt. He is able to generate it from either hand quickly with little charging time and no arm movement and is also capable of maintaining the bolt for several seconds. He has used lightning for a job at a power plant in Republic City and can effectively use it in combat. Additionally, Mako is able to generate lightning in the most stressful situations. For example, when the equalist leader Amon had Mako restrained via bloodbending, Mako was able to maintain the clarity in his mind to conjure a precise lightning directly at Amon despite his predicament.

== Reception ==
Mako received a mixed reception from both the media and fans, best summarized by reviewer Michal Schick in an article for Hypable: "Mako is a hard character to love, but he's also almost impossible to hate." In some circles Mako received critical acclaim. The character's backstory was praised, with the three part prequel to the series, "Republic City Hustle" praised for sensitively depicting Mako's difficult childhood. Mako has been described as "a slender Clark Kent", "the stereotypical heroic-type lead" and a respectable male character. The depiction of the strong, positive sibling relationship between Mako and Bolin also drew praise and the scene where Mako gives his grandmother his red scarf was described as "an unbelievably powerful moment shared by him, Bolin, and their family". Mako's heroic actions in the finale nearly sacrificing himself in the effort to destroy Kuvira's large robot also drew praise from reviewer Max Nicholson of IGN who opined that the character "earned back all his street cred by making a powerful and emotional sacrifice to destroy the engine himself." Reviewer Lauren Davis felt that while the writers of the series "weren't entirely sure how to treat Mako" after his romantic relationships ended, they made his role during the fourth season "stronger" than that of the previous season and he was given "his moment" in the series finale. Zach Blumenfeld of Paste ranked Mako as the 11th best character from the Avatar universe, noting that Mako has "a heart of gold, the rare cop who shows tough love and sympathy in every situation."

In other circles, Mako was panned. Reviewer Erin Tatum described Mako as "...a botched attempt to recapture the popularity of Zuko, resident bad boy and puberty catalyst of the A:TLA universe". In particular Mako's "love triangle" with fellow characters Korra and Asami was heavily criticized. Reviewer Alex Cranz described the situation as "soapiness usually reserved for shows about women banging vampires". Reviewer Hannah Strom described the love triangle as "ridiculousness" and described Mako as "kind of a terrible person". She also held that "both Korra and Asami are way too cool for any of this ridiculousness and should go run away and have their own adventures". At the conclusion of Season Two, reviewer Jason Krell created an extensive list of suggestions to make Season Three "amazing". At the top of his list was for Korra and Asami to "love Mako no more". Krell characterized the love triangle as a tired romantic dynamic. Reviewer Max Nicholson noted that fans "expressed frustration" with Mako in his treatment of particularly Asami in the saga while praising the show's creators decision to give voice to fans' frustrations with Mako in the form of Prince Wu in "Remembrances". On the other hand, Zach Blumenfeld of Paste wrote that "Mako represents one of the more adult and important takes on romance ever to appear in all-ages entertainment. His confused feelings for both Korra and Asami mirror the situation in which many a young boy will eventually find himself—wanting two girls, ending up with neither."

Following the conclusion of the series, reviewer William Cannon of the Latin Times listed a number of characters from The Legend of Korra who he felt would be suitable to have the lead role in a spin-off series. Mako and Bolin as co-leads made his list, with the reviewer commenting that "the funny awkward brother and the more serious brooding bro" would make "sitcom magic". Cannon felt that the two brothers had the best chemistry on The Legend of Korra. He also believed the fact that the two characters were "powerful benders" would make the spin-off series interesting. In response to Cannon's article, Adam Bellotto of Venture Capital Post was more reserved in his assessment of Bolin and Mako co-starring in a spin-off series. While he agreed with Cannon that a spin-off series focusing on the brothers would work well, Bellotto felt that such a series would be unoriginal. He held that either a new character or an underdeveloped character from the series was most appropriate to star in a spin-off.
