= World of Avatar: The Last Airbender =

Fictional world

The Avatar: The Last Airbender franchise takes place in a fantasy world inspired primarily by Asian and indigenous cultures. In the first animated series, it is made up of four nations based on the four classical elements: the Air Nomads, the Water Tribes, the Earth Kingdom, and the Fire Nation. A fifth nation, the United Republic of Nations, is introduced in The Legend of Korra. The world experiences a devastating apocalypse before the events of Avatar: Seven Havens, destroying the nations and laying waste to the world, except stronghold cities called the Seven Havens.

Series creators Michael Dante DiMartino and Bryan Konietzko drew from historical Asian cultures to develop a tone and style for the franchise's world. China is the predominant influence of the fantasy world, though various East Asian, South Asian, Southeast Asian and North American cultures were also incorporated. Many characters in the world of Avatar have the ability to "bend", or to psychokinetically manipulate the element associated with their nationality. One individual, the Avatar, is able to bend all four elements. Avatar: The Last Airbender takes place 100 years after the Fire Nation carried out a genocide against the Air Nomads.

== Bending ==
The physical movements associated with bending in the franchise draw extensively on traditional Chinese martial arts. To ensure that each bending discipline had a distinct and authentic style, creators Michael Dante DiMartino and Bryan Konietzko consulted martial arts expert Sifu Kisu of the Harmonious Fist Chinese Athletic Association. Kisu’s involvement helped establish specific real-world martial arts influences for each type of bending: tai chi for waterbending, with its emphasis on fluid, controlled motion; Hung Gar for earthbending, with its deep-rooted stances and solid power; Northern Shaolin for firebending, characterized by dynamic and strong hand and leg techniques; and Bagua for airbending, noted for its circular footwork and agility.

== Cultures ==
=== Air Nomads ===
The Air Nomads are a culture influenced by the monastic society of Shaolin monks and Tibetan Buddhism. Their conception of the Avatar is reminiscent of how Buddhists perceive the Bodhisattva. Aspects of Hinduism are also incorporated into the beliefs of the Air Nomads, including chakras and mudras. The Air Nomands experienced their golden age during the era of Avatar Sonam.

=== Water Tribes ===
The Water Tribes (水族; Shuǐ Zú) are communities located in the polar regions, based on circumpolar peoples such as the Inuit. The Southern Water Tribe is made up primarily of small villages, whereas the Northern Water Tribe contains vast cities of ice and snow. The Southern Water Tribe was a vassal state of the North Water Tribe, but achieved independence in 171 AG (After Genocide) after a civil war ensued.

=== Earth Kingdom ===
The Earth Kingdom (土國; Tǔ Guó) is an expansive nation that incorporates several real-world cultures, most notably Ming dynasty and Qing dynasty of China. Ba Sing Se, the capital city, is based on Beijing and the Forbidden City. Kyoshi Island of the Earth Kingdom resembles feudal Japan, with the resident Kyoshi Warriors donning uniforms based on those used in kabuki theater.

=== Fire Nation ===
The Fire Nation (烈火國; Liè Huǒ Guó) is an archipelago island country influenced by the military of Imperial Japan and the clothes and architecture of China.

=== United Republic of Nations ===
The United Republic of Nations (共和國; Gòng Hé Guó), simply known as the United Republic, is founded by Avatar Aang and Fire Lord Zuko after the end of the 100 Year War as the symbol of global unity, hosting all benders. Its capital city, Republic City (共和城; Gòng Hé Chéng), was described as "if Manhattan had happened in Asia", inspired by the 1920s and incorporates influences from American and European architecture from that time period. Elements of film noir and steampunk also played a significant influence. The design for the metalbending police force is based on 1920s New York City police uniforms, crossed with samurai armor.

=== In Seven Havens ===
Almost the entire world becomes inhospitable after a worldwide apocalyptic event, allegedly caused by Avatar Korra, shatters the nations and human civilization. Survivors decry the Avatar and create the strongholds called the Seven Havens, which are seven cities humans are confined to, beyond which are the Harshlands populated by constant natural calamities. There are fewer benders in the world as the birthrate of children with bending abilities has gradually decreased over time.

==== Ellora ====
Ellora, the "Haven of Wind and Sand", is one of the Seven Havens. It is located in the southwestern portion of the continent that was formerly the Earth Kingdom. It is a cosmopolitan city, hosting non-bender and all four types of benders. It is guarded by the Bending Brigade, which conscripts all benders. The Twin Avatars Pavi and Nisha are from Ellora.

== Reception ==
The world-building of Avatar: The Last Airbender has been positively received. Nicole Clark of Vice Media favorably compared the world of Avatar to that of Harry Potter and to J. R. R. Tolkien's Middle-earth. Christopher Mahon of Clarkesworld Magazine praised the world's evolution between Avatar: The Last Airbender and The Legend of Korra.
