= Raikou (disambiguation) =

Raikou is an Electric-type Pokémon in the Pokémon franchise.

Raikou may also refer to:

- Raikou (雷公), also known as Raijin (雷神), Kaminari-sama (雷様), Raiden-sama (雷電様), Narukami (鳴る神), a god of lightning, thunder and storms in Japanese mythology and the Shinto religion
- Raikou Minamoto, a character in the Tactics (タクティクス, Takutikusu) Japanese manga series
- Minamoto no Raikou, a.k.a. Minamoto no Yorimitsu (源 頼光, 948 – August 29, 1021), a Japanese historical figure who served the regents of the Fujiwara clan
- President Raiko, a character in The Legend of Korra television series and comics

== See also ==
- Raiko
