= Raiko =

Raiko may refer to:

- RAIKO (satellite) (雷鼓), a Japanese satellite
- Polina Raiko, Ukrainian naïve painter
- President Raiko, a character in The Legend of Korra television series and comics
- Raiko Horikawa, a fictional character in Double Dealing Character from the video game series Touhou Project

== See also ==
- Raikou (disambiguation)
  - Raikou, in List of generation II Pokémon
