= The Legend of Korra: Turf Wars =

American graphic novel series

- Cover of The Legend of Korra: Turf Wars – Part One, art by Heather Campbell and Jane Bak
- Date: July 26, 2017 (Part One); January 17, 2018 (Part Two); August 22, 2018 (Part Three)
- No. of issues: 3
- Publisher: Dark Horse Comics

Creative team
- Writers: Michael Dante DiMartino
- Artists: Irene Koh
- Letterers: Nate Piekos
- Colourists: Killian Ng
- Editors: Dave Marshall

Original publication
- Published in: The Legend of Korra
- ISBN: 9781506700151 (Part One); 9781506700403 (Part Two); 9781506701851 (Part Three); 9781506702025 (Library edition)

Chronology
- Followed by: Ruins of the Empire

The Legend of Korra: Turf Wars is a three-part graphic novel series written by Michael Dante DiMartino, with art by Irene Koh. It serves as a canonical continuation of the animated television series The Legend of Korra, created by DiMartino and Bryan Konietzko. The graphic novel trilogy is set after the show's final season, with Avatar Korra dealing with the aftermath of Kuvira's attack on Republic City, while also exploring her new relationship with Asami Sato.

Following the conclusion of The Legend of Korra, DiMartino was touched by positive reactions to Korra and Asami's relationship and felt that there were more stories to tell with the show's characters. Although the shift to the comic book medium was a challenge for DiMartino, it gave the creative team more freedom to explore LGBT narratives. The series was announced in July 2015 and The Legend of Korra: Turf Wars – Part One was published by Dark Horse Comics on July 26, 2017. Part Two was published on January 17, 2018, followed by Part Three on August 22, 2018. Part One and Two were the publisher's best-selling graphic novels of 2017 and 2018 respectively. A library edition collecting the three volumes was released on March 13, 2019.

The Legend of Korra: Turf Wars received positive reviews for its handling of Korra and Asami's romance. Critics also praised DiMartino's writing and Koh's art for evoking the style of the original series. On the other hand, the new villain Tokuga was found to be lacking in depth.

== Plot ==
=== Part One ===
Korra and Asami, now a couple, are forced to cut their spirit world holiday short after an altercation with a giant rock spirit, who resents Korra for creating a new spirit portal following her battle with Kuvira. The pair travel to the Southern Water Tribe to come out to Korra's parents. Although they are supportive of the relationship, Korra is upset when her father warns her against coming out publicly, owing to Water Tribe traditions. They then return to Republic City to discover that property developer Wonyong Keum is planning to turn the land surrounding the spirit portal into a tourist attraction, despite opposition from the Air Nomads and the spirits. A dragon-eel spirit urges Korra to close the portal to prevent its exploitation, but Korra refuses, believing the portal will ultimately benefit Republic City.

The next day, Korra and Asami join Tenzin and Zhu Li in helping out the refugees left homeless by Kuvira's attack, but have trouble working with President Raiko, who is more concerned with the upcoming presidential election. That evening, the Triple Threat Triad, a major crime syndicate in Republic City, attack the Air Nomads at the portal on Keum's orders. Korra and Asami, as well as their friends Mako and Bolin, both of whom are now police officers, show up to help the Air Nomads. A group of spirits attack despite Korra's efforts, and Korra is distracted when Asami is nearly killed in the fighting, allowing the dragon-eel spirit to attack Tokuga, the new leader of the Triple Threats, mutating him into a spirit-human hybrid. In the aftermath of the battle, Korra kisses Asami out of relief, leading to their friends discovering their relationship. Elsewhere, a furious Tokuga confronts Keum and takes control of his assets.

Meanwhile, police chief Lin Beifong orders Mako and Bolin to stay away from the wealthy and connected Keum until they have hard evidence of his crimes. They later obtain a tip-off about Tokuga's location, but it turns out to be a trap, and they narrowly escape with their lives. Mako and Bolin decide to investigate Keum by themselves, and discover that he has been missing since Tokuga's attack. Elsewhere, Asami does not show up for a date with Korra, leading Korra, Mako and Bolin to learn that she has been kidnapped. The Triple Threat Triad then attack a weapons depot, intending to use the weapons leftover from Kuvira's attack to take over Republic City. Korra, Mako and Bolin try to stop them, but back off after Tokuga threatens to kill Asami if they interfere.

=== Part Three ===
Tokuga threatens a captive Keum's life to force Asami to build an airship-mounted gas weapon, intending to use it to threaten Republic City into submission. Korra, Mako and Bolin track them down, but they are unable to stop Tokuga's airship from taking off with Asami and Keum on board. Korra makes it onto the airship and battles Tokuga, while Asami overpowers Tokuga's men and pilots the airship into the spirit world so as to prevent Tokuga from using his weapon on the people of Republic City. Tokuga is sent falling from the airship, but survives and flees into the spirit world.

Out of gratitude to Korra and Asami for saving his life, Keum gives up his claim to the land around the spirit portal, ending the conflict with the spirits. At a party in support of Zhu Li, Korra reconciles with her father, who chooses not to let his people's traditions influence his behavior towards his daughter. Zhu Li later wins the election in a landslide victory, and as she gives her victory speech, Korra and Asami observe the new spirit portal and admit their love for one another.

== Publication history ==
=== Production ===
The Legend of Korra is an American animated television series that was created by Bryan Konietzko and Michael Dante DiMartino as a sequel to Avatar: The Last Airbender. It aired over four seasons on the Nickelodeon television network from 2012 to 2014. The series notably ended with its two female leads, Korra and Asami Sato, starting a romantic relationship. Following the conclusion of The Legend of Korra, DiMartino was touched by the positive feedback from LGBT audiences about the impact Korra and Asami's relationship had in their lives. He also felt that there were still a lot more stories to tell with the characters given the events of the final season. At San Diego Comic-Con in July 2015, Konietzko and DiMartino announced a graphic novel trilogy that would follow the aftermath of the animated series. It was revealed that the graphic novels would be written by DiMartino and published by Dark Horse Comics, with Konietzko consulting on the art.

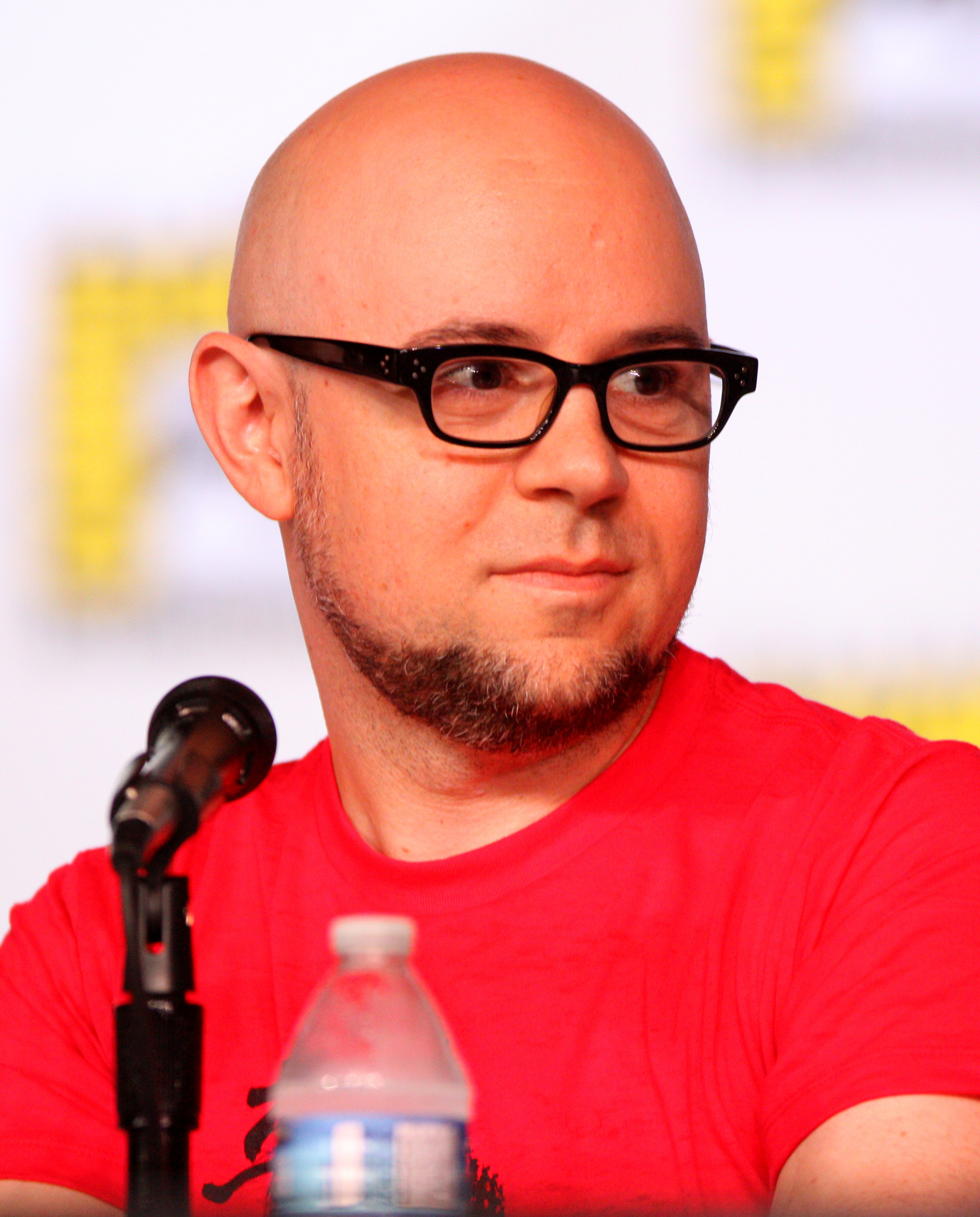
Michael Dante DiMartino, writer of The Legend of Korra: Turf Wars

DiMartino began outlining the trilogy in July 2015. Transitioning from television to the comic book medium posed a challenge for him, especially as this was the first comic he had ever written. The biggest change for DiMartino was being the sole writer as he was used to collaborating with others for his television scripts. The writer found that his background as a storyboard artist and director eased the transition as he was already used to visualizing images. DiMartino also had difficulty trying to incorporate the many characters and story arcs from the show into the graphic novels. On writing Korra and Asami's relationship, he noted that it was a balancing act as "[he] didn't want their romance to be too perfect, but [he] also didn't want to saddle it with too much conflict, either."

Brittney Williams was originally announced as the artist in October 2015. Williams later dropped out of the project and a new artist, Irene Koh, was announced in October 2016. After Williams' departure, a friend of Koh's was offered the job but recommended Koh instead. A self-described "bisexual Asian martial artist," Koh was already a fan of the franchise before being brought on and found that her background in martial arts helped her better illustrate the fighting sequences. She was asked to draw the art in her own style instead of the style of the animated series, and her style has been described as "more relaxed and loose." In addition to the largely Chinese, Japanese and Inuit-based characters featured in the animated series, Koh wanted to design more diverse Asian characters in the graphic novels. As a result, new characters introduced include a Bangladeshi, a Korean, as well as several South and Southeast Asians. Koh described working on The Legend of Korra: Turf Wars as "a deeply collaborative process," noting that she received a lot of feedback along the way from DiMartino, Konietzko and Nickelodeon.

=== Publication ===
The Legend of Korra: Turf Wars – Part One was released in comic book stores on July 26, 2017. Estimated sales were just under 4,000 copies, making it the sixth best-selling graphic novel for the month. It was released in mass market retailers the following month on August 8. Part Two was released in comic book stores on January 17, 2018, and was the best-selling graphic novel of the month with estimated sales of 6,262 copies. It was released in mass market retailers on January 30. Part Three was similarly first released in comic book stores on August 22, 2018, once again topping the best-sellers list with estimated sales of 5,481 copies. Part Three received mass market release on September 4, 2018.

Overall, Part One was Dark Horse Comics' best-selling graphic novel of 2017, while Part Two and Three were the publisher's top two best-selling graphic novels of 2018. The three volumes are collected in a library edition that was published on March 13, 2019. A sequel graphic novel trilogy, The Legend of Korra: Ruins of the Empire, began publication in May 2019.

== LGBT themes ==
Korra and Asami's first kiss. Art by Irene Koh and colors by Killian Ng.

The ending of The Legend of Korra, depicting its two female leads starting a same-sex relationship with each other, was unprecedented for LGBT representation in American children's television at the time. However, it was met with mixed reactions over the perceived subtle and last-minute reveal of the relationship. With The Legend of Korra: Turf Wars, the shift to the comic book medium gave the creative team more flexibility to explore LGBT themes, including showing the couple's first kiss.

The romance between Korra and Asami is a major focus of the graphic novels. DiMartino felt that it was natural for the books to give prominence to a same-sex couple as he and Konietzko had always considered the franchise to be "very inclusive." Jason Segarra, writing for Adventures in Poor Taste, saw this focus as DiMartino's attempt to address concerns over the ending of the animated series. Unlike the original series which had time jumps between each season, DiMartino felt that it was important for readers of the comics to see the early stages of Korra and Asami's relationship. As such, Part One begins immediately after the ending of the animated series, with the first part of the book dedicated solely to the pair's getaway in the spirit world. The Legend of Korra: Turf Wars also looks at the coming out process as Korra and Asami come out to friends and family to varying reactions.

Part One establishes the historical treatment of LGBT individuals by the different nations of this fantasy world, with some nations revealed to be unaccepting of them. According to DiMartino, he and Konietzko "thought the best approach was to view LGBTQ representation through the lens of the different cultures." Kya and Avatar Kyoshi were also revealed to be queer. On the decision to introduce homophobia into this fictional universe, artist Irene Koh noted that "there's a lot of potency to seeing loved, powerful characters like Korra and Asami dealing with the same struggles I (and other queer people) face." According to Koh, the creative team wanted Korra and Asami to be "empathetic parallels" for LGBT readers.

== Critical response ==
The Legend of Korra: Turf Wars was generally well received by critics as a "genuine" extension of the animated series. Reviews of Part One praised DiMartino's writing for keeping the characterizations true to the original series, such that "it really does end up feeling like you're reading the premiere of [The Legend of Korra] season five." Part One was named the "Best All-Ages Comic" of 2017 by Entertainment Weekly and selected as one of the top 15 comics of 2017 by io9.

Critics enjoyed the developing romance between Korra and Asami, described as the "emotional backbone" and the "strongest aspect" of the graphic novels. The addition of LGBT history and characters to the franchise's mythology received positive reviews: The A.V. Club felt it brought "considerable depth" to the worldbuilding, Geek.com found it "[made] for satisfyingly fresh and fascinating fantasy," and Autostraddle concluded it was "both great for representation and accurate to real life." Critical Hit observed: "It's a little jolting and anachronistic to hear characters dropping terms like 'coming out,' but everything is done with its heart in the right place."

Reviewers for Sci-fi and Fantasy Network and CGMagazine singled out main villain Tokuga as the weak point of the story, and were disappointed in his lack of depth compared to The Legend of Korra's previous antagonists. The Geekiary reviewer was also critical of the "simplified" handling of certain subplots such as Raiko's presidential election campaign. On the other hand, ComicsVerse felt that the tackling of gang violence and political corruption was timely and showed the "intellectual respect" the series has for its young readers.

Koh's art was praised for being unique and engaging, yet still evoking the familiar style of the animated series. Reviewers also complimented her "dynamic and exciting" action sequences, as well as her "nuanced grasp of facial expression and body language." Newsarama felt that Koh's main strength was in conveying the characters' emotions, but was disappointed with her "simplistic" backgrounds. According to io9's James Whitbrook, Koh's art coupled with Killian Ng's coloring—described as using "a much warmer palette compared to the show"— resulted in "some really vivid, sumptuous vistas." Part One's illustrations of Korra and Asami's vacation in the spirit world, colored by Ng with a "romantic pastel palette," was praised by Comic Crusaders for its "large luxurious panels filled with pure fantasy," and singled out by Geek.com as the "best stuff in the book." Writing for The A.V. Club, Oliver Sava appreciated Nate Piekos's lettering, particularly the "bending" sound effects which he thought enhanced the action sequences.
