= Irene Koh =

Comics artist

- Born: Irene Koh; September 18, 1990 (age 36) Seoul, South Korea
- Area: California

Irene Koh is a comics artist from Seoul, South Korea. She has previously worked with large comics publishers like Dark Horse Comics, DC Comics, and Marvel Comics. She was the main artist for Turf Wars trilogy of The Legend of Korra comics.

== Biography ==
Koh was born on September 18, 1990, in Seoul, South Korea. Since then, she has lived in Tokyo, New England and Los Angeles. She resides in the San Francisco Bay Area, where she continues to work as a comics artist. She went to school at the Rhode Island School of Design, where she graduated with her Bachelor of Fine Arts in Illustration in 2012.

== Career ==
Koh has had her work featured in comics published by Dark Horse Comics, DC Comics, Marvel Comics, IDW Publishing, Oni Press, and Stela. As of November 2017 she is the main penciller and inker for The Legend of Korra: Turf Wars comics. Koh is also the creator of the comic Afrina and the Glass Coffin. She has also worked on comics such as Teenage Mutant Ninja Turtles: Casey and April, Sensation Comics Featuring Wonder Woman, and Secret Origins #10: Batgirl.

== Bibliography ==
- Batgirl (2011) vol. 01: "Batgirl of Burnside", penciller
- Teenage Mutant Ninja Turtles: Casey and April (2015) #1-4, main artist
- Sensation Comics Featuring Wonder Woman (2014) #45: 'Besties' part 1 of 3, penciller and inker
- Secret Loves of Geek Girls (2015) #1, writer
- Another Castle (2016) #1, cover artist
- Fresh Romance: The Only One (2017) One-Shot, penciller and cover artist
- The Legend of Korra: Turf Wars (2017—2018) Part One – Part Three, artist
- Afrina and the Glass Coffin, creator
