= List of Avatar: The Last Airbender characters =

From left to right, Sokka, Mai, Katara, Suki, Momo, Zuko, Aang, Toph, and Iroh relaxing at the end of the series finale of Avatar: The Last Airbender.

This is a list of significant characters from the Nickelodeon animated television series Avatar: The Last Airbender and its sequel The Legend of Korra, co-created by Bryan Konietzko and Michael Dante DiMartino, as well the live-action Avatar series. This list also includes characters from the comic continuations as well as the Kyoshi, Yangchen and Roku prequel novels by FC Yee, Michael Dante DiMartino and Randy Ribay.

== Overview ==
In The Last Airbender, a fictional universe composed of four sovereign nations, some people are "benders" and can control air, fire, earth or water. Only the Avatar—a being who represents the bridge between the physical and spirit worlds—can master all four elements and thus bring balance to the world, but has been missing for the past 100 years. During this absence, a one hundred year-long world war started by the Fire Nation resulted in the Air Nomads' genocide, the near extinction of the Southern Tribes' waterbending population, and the Earth Kingdom's extensive forced displacement and colonization.

=== Character conception ===
Character designs were originated from a series of drawings by one of the show's creators, Bryan Konietzko. The main sketch depicted a middle-aged monk with an arrow on his head and later included a flying bison as his pet. Konietzko's partner, Michael Dante DiMartino, was interested in documentaries related to the South Pole at the time. They combined these ideas and created the concept of an "air guy" and "water guys" trapped in a snowy wasteland, with "fire guys" invading them. Additionally, the writers based the characters' different bending abilities on distinct styles of martial arts.

The characters of Avatar: The Last Airbender were designed by Michael Dante DiMartino and Bryan Konietzko, the co-creators of the series. The anime-styled character art was inspired by Shinichiro Watanabe's Cowboy Bebop, Samurai Champloo, and FLCL (Fooly Cooly) of Gainax. The original character conception was derived from a sketch by Bryan Konietzko that depicted a middle-aged balding man with an arrow on his head. Studios such as Studio 4°C, Production I.G, and Studio Ghibli, which produced anime-styled cartoons, were also sources of inspiration.

=== Influences ===
The greatest influences on the series were Asian art, culture and history; the characters' various personalities and traits are based on philosophical teachings such as Taoism and Buddhism. In the show, some characters have the ability to manipulate one of the four classic elements of ancient philosophy: Water, Earth, Fire and Air, although the Avatar has the ability to control all four. Each of these employ a different form of martial arts in their fighting choreography: tai chi for Waterbending, Hung Gar for Earthbending, Northern Shaolin for Firebending, and baguazhang for Airbending. These individual styles of martial arts also reflect on the personalities of the user and the nations as a whole. These starkly individual tendencies are explained in eighty-five distinct types of "jings", or internal energy. For example: baguazhang employs the "negative jing" to create erratic circular movements and capitalizes on centripetal force and defensive positions; Northern Shaolin follows the "positive jing" and emphasizes brute strength and aggression to generate power; and Hung Gar uses the "neutral jing" in its ability to predict an opponent's movements and heavily relies on patience and reacting to the opponent's fighting accordingly.

The cultures of the four nations are also greatly influenced by East Asian and indigenous cultures. The Water Tribe is based on Inuit, Yupik, and Sirenik cultures; the Fire Nation on Imperial China and Imperial Japan; the Air Nomads on Tibetan Buddhist monks, Tibetan culture, Buddhism and Hinduism; and the Earth Kingdom on Imperial China with Korean cultural influences.

=== Personalities ===
Many of the recurring characters of the series have received traits based on the respective element. Aang is carefree and childlike, as is commonly attributed to "wonder" of the unknown, or the "freedom" of the wind and the air. As a spiritualist, a pacifist and a vegetarian, he is very Yin, hyper-attuned to the spirit world, and prefers non-violent alternatives to solving problems. Toph, despite being blind, is extremely perceptive of the world around her due to her connection to the Earth. Unlike Aang, she is extremely brusque when criticizing others, as attributed to Earth's toughness.

== Avatar: The Last Airbender main characters ==
=== Overview ===
| Character | Voiced by | Avatar: The Last Airbender | | |
| Character | Voiced by | Book One: Water | Book Two: Earth | Book Three: Fire |
|---|---|---|---|---|
| Character | Voiced by | 2005 | 2006 | 2007–08 |
| Avatar Aang | Zach Tyler Eisen | Main | Main | Main |
| Katara | Mae Whitman | Main | Main | Main |
| Sokka | Jack DeSena | Main | Main | Main |
| Toph Beifong | Jessie Flower | | Main | Main |
| Zuko | Dante Basco | Main | Main | Main |
| Appa | Dee Bradley Baker | Main | Main | Main |
| Momo | Dee Bradley Baker | Main | Main | Main |
| Iroh | Mako Iwamatsu | Main | Main | |
| Iroh | Greg Baldwin | | | Main |
| Azula | Grey DeLisle | Silent | Recurring | Recurring |
| Fire Lord Ozai | Mark Hamill | Guest | Guest | Recurring |

=== Avatar Aang ===
Avatar Aang or simply Aang (Chinese: 安昂; pinyin: Ān'áng) (voiced by Mitchel Musso in the unaired pilot, voiced by Zach Tyler Eisen in Avatar: The Last Airbender, D. B. Sweeney in Books One and Two of The Legend of Korra, Eric Nam in Avatar Aang: The Last Airbender, Sander Argabrite as a young boy in Avatar Aang: The Last Airbender, portrayed by Noah Ringer in The Last Airbender, Gordon Cormier in the live-action series) is the main protagonist of the original series and the current Avatar, a cyclically reincarnating being who maintains world balance. Aang often acts in a fun-loving, carefree manner. His pacifism and vegetarianism are primary traits of Buddhism. The creators intended Aang to "defeat enemies with his wits" and be a "trickster hero". Though Aang is often frivolous and enthusiastic, he becomes serious during a crisis. In the original series, Katara and Sokka rescue Aang from a century of suspended animation due to being frozen in an iceberg. Having already mastered his native Airbending, Aang learns Waterbending from Katara and later Pakku at the North Pole in Book One, Earthbending from Toph in Book Two, and Firebending from Zuko in Book Three. Throughout the series, Aang aids the Water Tribes and the Earth Kingdom, whom the Fire Nation has oppressed. Unwilling to kill Fire Lord Ozai despite the past Avatars insisting on it, Aang ultimately learns the ancient Lion-Turtles' technique of energybending, which allows the user to give or take away a person's bending, and uses it to render Ozai a non-bender. According to The Official Cookbook: Recipes From the Four Nations, his favorite food is the egg custard tart. In The Legend of Korra, it is revealed that Aang, with the help of his friends, created the United Republic of Nations. He also married Katara and had three children, with his youngest son Tenzin restoring the Air Nomads while instructing the next Avatar, Korra. Like Roku before him, Aang appears at times before his reincarnation Korra, serving as a spiritual advisor, prior to their connection being destroyed by Unalaq.

=== Appa ===
Appa (阿柏; Ābǎi) (vocal effects provided by Dee Bradley Baker in the original animated series, Matthew Yang King in the live-action series) is Aang's male giant sky bison, animal guide and spirit companion. He was born in the Eastern Air Temple, the place where Aang met him. He is Aang's best friend and serves as the group's mode of transport around the world. He can fly and can use his tail to create powerful gusts of air. According to Aang, flying bisons were the first Airbenders. The show's creators, Michael Dante DiMartino and Bryan Konietzko, have described Appa's appearance as a cross between a bison and a manatee. He is known to shed his coat at the end of winter. According to The Official Cookbook: Recipes from the four nations, during long journeys when Appa is tired, Aang prepares an apple salad for him, a recipe found in the same book under the name "Appa's Apple Salad", as it provides him with enough energy to continue.

=== Momo ===
Momo (模模; Mómó) (vocal effects provided by Dee Bradley Baker in the original animated series, Matthew Yang King in the live-action-series) is the only known Winged Lemur. Avatar: The Last Airbender co-creator Bryan Konietzko admits that Momo is his favorite character to draw and that his body language is derived from memories of his childhood cat. Momo was introduced when Aang finds him at the Southern Air Temple and then keeps him as a pet. Although Momo has been in many dangerous situations while traveling with the protagonists, he has also been of aid to them and a source of comic relief throughout the series. According to the creators, Momo was intended to represent the spirit of Monk Gyatso, Aang's mentor. Momo is a cross between Bat and a Lemur and is the last of his kind in the show much like Appa (though it is possible based on the descriptions by the Pirate Captain in "The Waterbending Scroll" and by Tho in "The Swamp" that a few more of his kind may exist in captivity and circuses elsewhere in the Four Nations). Momo was introduced in the episode "The Southern Air Temple". In the episode, Aang finds Momo at the Southern Air Temple and then keeps him as a pet. After Momo eats a peach, Aang decides to name him Momo, which is Japanese for "peach".

=== Katara ===
Katara (卡塔拉; Qiǎtǎlā) (voiced by Mae Whitman in the original series, Eva Marie Saint in Books One, Two, and Four of the sequel series, Jessica Matten in Avatar Aang: The Last Airbender, portrayed by Nicola Peltz in the live-action film, Kiawentiio in the live-action series) is a 14-year-old Waterbending girl from the Southern Water Tribe, best friend, then love interest, and later wife of Avatar Aang, and Sokka's younger sister. In the original series, Katara is known to be very caring and compassionate while also having a strong determination to stand up against systems of oppression and injustice. While she may have been a relatively inexperienced Waterbender at the start of the series, by the end of Book One Katara manages to claim the title of "Waterbending Master" surpassing the skillset of Avatar Aang. Having left the Northern Water Tribe at the beginning of Book Two Katara continues to train Aang's as his teacher. In the episode "The Deserter" Katara learns that she possesses healing abilities, which she often uses to help her friends throughout the series. In addition to healing, Katara's abilities as a Waterbender range from temperature control, (turning water into ice shaped weapons such as spears, hooks, and blades as well as controlling steam) using streams of water to grab onto people and platforms, being able to manipulate the water in clouds, creating pockets of air in large bodies of water, being able to pull water from the air and plants, and the ability to control the water inside another living organism also known as Bloodbending. In The Legend of Korra, Katara is revealed to have married Aang and had three children with him. It is also revealed that she becomes Avatar Korra's Waterbending teacher after the death of Aang.

=== Sokka ===
Sokka (索卡; Suǒqiǎ) (voiced by Jack DeSena in the original series, Chris Hardwick in the sequel series, portrayed by Jackson Rathbone in the live-action film, Ian Ousley in the live-action series) is a 15-year-old warrior boy of the Southern Water Tribe, a cool joker and Katara's older brother. With no bending power of his own, Sokka relies largely on a metallic boomerang, a blunt metal club, a machete, and later a black jian, or sword, created from the metals of a meteorite. Surprisingly in an inhabitant of a mystical world, Sokka is an engineer and something of a jack-of-all-trades, in which respect he is easily able to understand the Fire Nation's advanced technology, and perfects the design of the hot air balloon. In addition, he is both heterodox and resourceful in his endeavors, and a source of comic relief throughout the series. Sokka was in love with the Northern Water Tribe princess Yue at the end of Book One and later shifted his affections to the Kyoshi Warriors' leader Suki in Books Two and Three. In the sequel series, flashbacks reveal Sokka was the first representative of the Southern Water Tribe to sit on the Republic City Council, and possibly its first chairman. He died a few years after Aang, when the next Avatar, Korra, was still a child.

=== Toph Beifong ===
Toph Beifong (北方拓芙; Běifāng Tuòfú) (voiced by Jessie Flower in Books Two and Three of the original series, voiced by Kate Higgins in flashbacks of Books One and Three from the sequel series, and by Philece Sampler in Book Four of the sequel series, portrayed by Miyako in the live-action series) is a blind and barefoot Earthbending girl of the prestigious Beifong family in the Earth Kingdom. In the original series, Toph helps Aang master Earthbending. Toph is often sarcastic, direct, and confrontational; commonly depicted as the choleric and tomboy of the group. Though blind, Toph can feel vibrations in the earth. Through this heightened sense, she can identify people's locations, their distance from her, and their physical build. She learned this technique from the blind Badgermoles. This 'seismic sense' provides her with a distinct advantage when facing other Earthbenders in combat, as they require contact with the ground and extract rocks from their surroundings. As another result of her blindness, Toph has acute hearing, enabling her to recognize people by the sound of their voices and to eavesdrop on distant conversations. Unlike other Earthbenders, Toph has a distinct style of earthbending not based on Hung Gar but on the Southern Praying Mantis, featuring quick generation of energy and low kicks, to suit her small stature. Toph taught herself metalbending by manipulating the metals' impurities at the end of Book Two and throughout Book Three. In the sequel series, flashbacks reveal that Toph was the first Chief of the Metalbending Police Force, the police department of Republic City. Toph eventually became a single mother of two daughters: Lin, who eventually succeeded her mother as police chief, and Suyin, who founded a commune of free-thinking Earth and metalbenders known as Zaofu. By the time the series begins, having once lived with Suyin's family in Zaofu, Toph took residence in the Foggy Swamp where she assists Korra.

=== Zuko ===
Zuko (豎髙, 祖寇, 蘇科; Shù Méng, Zǔ Kòu, Sū Kē) (voiced by Dante Basco in the original animated series, Bruce Davison in the sequel series, portrayed by Dev Patel in the live-action film, Dallas Liu in the live-action series) is the banished prince of the Fire Nation, who ultimately becomes Fire Lord. When exiled, prior to the beginning of the series, by his father Fire Lord Ozai for forfeiting an Agni Kai (a special firebending duel therewith) against him when Zuko thought that he would be facing the general whose plans he spoke out against, Zuko believed that capturing the Avatar would regain his honor. In addition to his firebending, Zuko is proficient in the use of double broadswords wielded in his alter ego of the "Blue Spirit".

Zuko's ancestry reflects his own anxieties, in that his paternal great-grandfather Fire Lord Sozin started the war to expand to the whole world his nation's greatness while his maternal great-grandfather Avatar Roku attempted to prevent it.

In Book One, Zuko fails many times to capture the Avatar but disguises himself as the Blue Spirit and rescues Aang from Zhao's fortress. In Book Two, Zuko and his Uncle Iroh earn further displeasure from Ozai and Azula and they are subsequently forced to flee into the Earth Kingdom, where he befriends locals and goes so far as to rescuing them from corrupt Earth Army guards. When tempted by his sister Azula's offer of honor's restoration, he betrays his uncle to assist Azula's fight against the Avatar. In Book Three, Zuko eventually rejects his father Ozai's plans and joins Aang.

After he learns the secret of Firebending with Aang from two dragons, Zuko becomes Aang's Firebending teacher; helps Sokka rescue prisoners; assists Katara in confronting her mother's killer; and receives his uncle Iroh's forgiveness. After defeating Azula, Zuko becomes the new Fire Lord and ends the war.

The sequel series reveals that Fire Lord Zuko aided Avatar Aang in reorganizing the Fire Nation's colonies in the Earth Kingdom as a United Republic of Nations and is the only one of Republic City's founders not to have lived there. After abdicating the throne in favor of his daughter Izumi while her son Iroh later serves as a general in the United Forces, Zuko travels the world as an ambassador for peace and keeping major threats in check while Aang's reincarnation Korra is still a child.

=== Uncle Iroh ===
Uncle Iroh (艾洛; Àiluò) (voiced by Mako in Books One and Two of the original series, Greg Baldwin in Book Three of the original series and Books Two and Three of the sequel series, portrayed by Shaun Toub in the live-action film, Paul Sun-Hyung Lee in the live-action series), also known as General Iroh and "The Dragon of the West", is an expert Firebending master and former heir to the Fire Nation throne. After the death of his son Lu Ten at the Siege of Ba Sing Se, his younger brother Ozai superseded him as Fire Lord. When his nephew Zuko was banished by Ozai with the banishment being lifted if he can bring him the Avatar alive, Iroh willingly accompanied Zuko and the soldiers assigned to him on the mission.

Unlike most firebenders, Iroh lacks hostility toward other nations and generates his fire and lightning not from fury, as is conventional, but from an understanding of fire as a source of life-giving energy. He learned this from the dragons, the original source of firebending, and protected them from being discovered by stating (falsely) that he killed the last remaining dragons. As a member of the Order of the White Lotus, Iroh has social connections throughout the Four Nations. Iroh is outwardly easy-going and friendly and particularly fond of food, good tea (ginseng tea is his favorite), the strategy game Pai Sho, cheerful company, and pleasant music.

In his old age, he focuses more on relaxation and amusements than on the pursuit of the Avatar, a habit that clashes with the obsessions of his nephew Zuko. At the end of the series, after enlisting his fellow White Lotus members to release Ba Sing Se from the Fire Nation's rule, Iroh reopened his tea shop within the city called "The Jasmine Dragon".

In The Legend of Korra sequel series, near the end of his life, Iroh left his physical body and his soul ascended into the Spirit World where he offers his assistance to Aang's reincarnation Korra, and later to Aang's children Tenzin, Kya, and Bumi during their initial visits to the Spirit World. Iroh is also the namesake of Zuko's grandson.

=== Azula ===
Azula (voiced by Grey DeLisle in Books Two and Three of the animated series, portrayed by Summer Bishil in the live-action film, Elizabeth Yu in the live-action series) is Zuko's younger sister and a gifted Firebending master and prodigy, capable of creating blue fire and lightning. After Zhao's death, Azula is sent by Ozai to capture the Avatar, Zuko (who is still considered a failure), and Iroh (who Ozai branded a traitor to his cause). Her amorality and ability to act without hesitation or remorse also accounts for her ability to create lightning, a skill that requires peace of mind. Despite her cruel temperament, she becomes distraught when abandoned by her friends Mai and Ty Lee, and collapses mentally when her father leaves her the now-worthless position of Fire Lord, in which she becomes increasingly irrational, paranoid, and mentally unstable, and ultimately suffers a full psychotic breakdown, in which she is overcome by Zuko and Katara. Following the end of the war, Azula is placed at a mental institution to be closely monitored. As revealed in the comic sequel, The Search, Azula managed to convince Zuko to let her accompany him in the search for their mother. But in reality, her madness tied to the hatred she bears towards her mother, Azula's reasons were to eliminate Ursa upon finding a letter that claimed Zuko to be only her half-brother and thus making her the legitimate heir to the throne. But after her attempt to kill her mother failed, and unable to accept Zuko still caring for her after everything she had done to him, Azula fled into the Forgetful Valley before the letter's contents were later revealed to be false.

=== Fire Lord Ozai ===
Fire Lord Ozai (奧載, 敖載; Ào Zǎi, Áo Zǎi) (voiced by Mark Hamill in the animated series, portrayed by Cliff Curtis in the live-action film, Daniel Dae Kim in the live-action series) is the ruler of the Fire Nation, Azulon and IIah's younger son, General Iroh's younger brother, Zuko and Azula's father, and the main antagonist of the series. He is often depicted as unnecessarily cruel and callous as well as hot-tempered, such as when he is seen scarring Zuko's face and banishing him for perceived disrespect during a flashback in "The Storm" when Zuko questioned a general's orders as the live-action series would have the general sacrificing the 41st Unit in a suicide mission. Ozai would only lift Zuko's banishment if he would bring the Avatar to him alive as the live-action series also had Ozai advising Zuko to take the 41st Unit with him. Ozai shows Azula favor, but only due to her skill as a prodigy and being an embodiment of his ideals rather than any genuine love. Having welcomed his son home after Azula lied to him that Zuko killed Aang, Ozai is furious to learn of the Avatar's survival. When Sozin's Comet draws near, Ozai crowns himself 'Phoenix King' and embarks to destroy the Earth Kingdom, entrusting an unstable Azula with their homeland. Defeated by Aang, Ozai is stripped of his ability to firebend and imprisoned.

== The Legend of Korra main characters ==
=== Overview ===
| Character | Voiced by | The Legend of Korra | | | |
| Character | Voiced by | Book One: Air | Book Two: Spirits | Book Three: Change | Book Four: Balance |
|---|---|---|---|---|---|
| Character | Voiced by | 2012 | 2013 | 2014 | |
| Avatar Korra | Janet Varney | Main | Main | Main | Main |
| Mako | David Faustino | Main | Main | Main | Main |
| Bolin | P. J. Byrne | Main | Main | Main | Main |
| Asami Sato | Seychelle Gabriel | Main | Main | Main | Main |
| Tenzin | J. K. Simmons | Main | Main | Main | Main |
| Lin Beifong | Mindy Sterling | Main | Main | Main | Main |
| Naga | Dee Bradley Baker | Main | Main | Main | Main |
| Pabu | Dee Bradley Baker | Main | Main | Main | Main |
| Jinora | Kiernan Shipka | Recurring | Main | Main | Main |

=== Avatar Korra ===
Avatar Korra (柯拉, 寇拉; Kēlā, Kòulā) (voiced by Janet Varney as a teenager, Cora Baker as a child) is the immediate reincarnation of Aang from the original series. Athletic, confident, tomboyish and headstrong, Korra fully embraces and relishes her role as the Avatar, but lacked in spiritual development. Over the course of the series, Korra battles foes, both within and outside herself, as she tries to keep the world in balance. She overcomes having her bending removed by Amon, having her connection to her past lives severed by Unalaq and Vaatu, suffering posttraumatic stress disorder due to Zaheer's mercury poisoning, and having her position as world peacekeeper usurped by the military dictator Kuvira. Korra is especially notable in the Avatar franchise for connecting with the first Avatar Wan and starting a new Avatar cycle.

Korra was designed to be an inversion of Aang. Said DiMartino, "We also wanted to explore an Avatar who was the exact opposite of peaceful Aang, so we chose a hot-headed teenage girl from the Water Tribe. Her 'punch first and ask questions later' attitude opened up a whole new world of story possibilities." Korra's design was a collaboration between Konietzko, co-executive producer Joaquim Dos Santos and supervising producer Ki-Hyun Ryu. Four-year-old Korra was designed by Ryu. For Korra's look and attitude, the designers took reference from mixed martial artist Gina Carano as well as competitive female snowboarders.

==== Naga ====
Naga (voiced by Dee Bradley Baker) is a female polar bear-dog that belongs to Avatar Korra as her loyal animal companion and main form of transportation. Historically, polar bear-dogs were feared and hunted by the Water Tribe, and Korra is the only person to have ever befriended one. Naga is very protective of Korra, and uses her strength to help Korra out of trouble. The story of how Korra and Naga met is featured in the first official The Legend of Korra comic, published by Dark Horse Comics for 2016 Free Comic Book Day.

Naga was first revealed at the 2011 The Legend of Korra San Diego Comic-Con panel. Naga's design is based on a hybrid of a polar bear and a golden retriever. One of the three original concepts for Avatar: The Last Airbender, Naga was first developed in 2002 as a sketch of a bipedal polar bear-dog creature by co-creator Bryan Konietzko. The creators never found a place for the character in the first series, but brought her back as Korra's companion as they wanted Korra to have an animal mode of transport, and the original sketch was remodeled after the co-creators' dogs.

=== Mako ===
Mako (馬高, 馬科; Mǎ Gāo, Mǎ Kē) (voiced by David Faustino) is a firebender who grew up on the streets of Republic City as an orphan with his younger brother, Bolin. Forced to take on adult responsibilities at a young age, Mako is cynical and serious. Physically, Mako is tall, lean and handsome. Mako is Korra's love interest during the first two seasons, but they decide in the season 2 finale "Light in The Dark" that they are better off as friends. Mako is level-headed and fiercely loyal, and as the series progresses, he becomes someone his brother and friends can always rely on.

The final design for Mako was done by supervising producer Ki-Hyun Ryu. The character was named after the late Mako Iwamatsu, the original voice actor of Iroh in the first two seasons of Avatar: The Last Airbender.

=== Bolin ===
Bolin (愽林; Bó Lín) (voiced by P. J. Byrne) is an earthbender who grew up on the streets of Republic City as an orphan with his older brother, Mako. Despite his tough childhood, Bolin is high-spirited, easy-going, optimistic, and has a somewhat childlike and naive view of the world. Physically, he is stocky and muscular. Bolin acts as the comic relief of the show, and is constantly underestimated by those around him. In the season 3 episode "Enter the Void", Bolin discovers he can lavabend, a rare earthbending technique. Loyal and brave, Bolin matures throughout the series and tries to help others in ways other than fighting.

The idea for Bolin and Mako's characters came from the creators desire to include a story about brothers in the series. They were also meant to illustrate how cultures had blended in Republic City, with their late mother and father hailing from the Fire Nation and Earth Kingdom respectively. Bolin's character was inspired by the original concept of Toph Beifong, who was going to be a male character Konietzko described as "kind of a big, not sharpest tool in the shed." When Toph's character was changed to a young girl, the creators still had many ideas for the male earthbender, which they implemented into Bolin. The final design for Bolin was done by supervising producer Ki-Hyun Ryu. Bolin is voiced by P.J. Byrne. Bryne related to the character as he explained, "I'm a people person, I'm a peoplely people, and I think that's what my character is."

==== Pabu ====
Pabu (voiced by Dee Bradley Baker) is a mischievous male fire ferret who Bolin rescued from a local pet store. The story of how Mako and Bolin come to adopt Pabu is featured in the Nickelodeon three-part web series Republic City Hustle.

Pabu was first revealed at the 2011 The Legend of Korra San Diego Comic-Con panel. Pabu was designed by Konietzko, and is based on a hybrid of a red panda and a black-footed ferret. The original inspiration for Pabu was Futa, the "seemingly-bipedal red panda who had captured the adoration of the Japanese public" years ago during the production of Avatar: The Last Airbender.

=== Asami Sato ===
Asami Sato (佐藤麻尾; Zuǒ Téng Má Wěi) (voiced by Seychelle Gabriel) is the nonbender only child of wealthy industrialist Hiroshi Sato. After her Equalist father was imprisoned following the events of season 1, she took over his company, Future Industries.

Although the well-mannered Asami grew up in a life of luxury, she also has a tough side. She is an expert driver and has been trained in self-defense since she was a child. She often uses an electrified chi-blocker glove for combat. As the only nonbender in Team Avatar, Asami compensates for this with her mastery of hand-to-hand combat, mechanic skills, and tech savvy. Throughout the series, she invents various weapons, devices and modes of transportation the team uses. Later on in the series, she becomes Korra's closest confidant and eventual girlfriend.

The idea for the character of Asami came later in the development process. Said DiMartino, "Once we had the idea for a nonbender revolution, we knew we'd need a character who wasn't a bender." Originally conceived to be an Equalist spy, DiMartino and Konietzko ended up liking the character so much that they decided to keep her on Team Avatar. Konietzko had previously had difficulty drawing women and chose to design Asami by himself, wanting a challenge. According to Konietzko, Asami's design was his "idea of a Hollywood Golden Age actress in the Avatar world," and her hair was inspired by that of 1940s actress Rita Hayworth.

=== Tenzin ===
Tenzin (voiced by J. K. Simmons) is the youngest child of Avatar Aang and Katara, and the couple's only airbending child. Tenzin is a traditionalist who works hard to protect and pass on Air Nomad teachings and culture. He embodies the peaceful, calm, spiritual nature of the Air Nomads. At the start of the series, he was the only airbending master in the world and thus served as Avatar Korra's airbending teacher and spiritual guide. Tenzin, however, had to undergo a lot of spiritual growth himself, facing his insecurities of living in his father's shadow. Tenzin and his wife Pema have four children: Jinora, Ikki, Meelo and Rohan.

Tenzin is the biggest link to Avatar Aang and the original series. On the conception of Tenzin's character, DiMartino said, "He was probably the second character we came up with after Korra. Since Korra would have to learn airbending, who would be better to teach it to her than Aang's son? His peaceful, traditionalist personality also provide a good source of conflict for the hotheaded, modern-thinking Korra." Tenzin's final design was done by supervising producer Ki-Hyun Ryu.

=== Lin Beifong ===
Lin Beifong (voiced by Mindy Sterling and by Grey DeLisle when young) is the Chief of Police of Republic City's metalbender police force, the daughter of Toph Beifong, and the older half-sister of Suyin Beifong. A play on the "tough cop trope", Lin is tough and uncompromising, but also loyal and brave.

Although her mother taught Avatar Korra's previous incarnation, Aang, how to earthbend, Lin displayed no affection toward her when they first met, instead seeing Korra's arrival as a threat to her authority and to the rule of law she's worked hard to enforce. Lin's feelings toward Korra improve as the series progresses, and she would do anything to protect the Avatar from danger. In season 1, Lin and Tenzin work through their strained relationship caused by their past romance, and Lin ultimately helps save Tenzin's family from The Equalists. Lin's estranged relationship with her mother and half-sister is explored in seasons 3 and 4. In the season 3 episode "The Metal Clan", Lin and her sister Suyin meet again for the first time in 30 years. It is revealed in the following episode, "Old Wounds", that Suyin was the one who gave Lin her distinctive facial scars. The sisters eventually reconciled after a duel. In the season 4 episode "Operation Beifong", Lin reveals that she still harbors a lot of anger over Toph's decision not to reveal the identity of her father to her. After 20 years apart, the estranged mother and daughter finally reconcile after admitting their flaws. Zach Blumenfeld of Paste magazine described Lin's story as one that "unfolds beautifully over the course of The Legend of Korra," noting that "she balances the female strength that pervades the Avatar universe with the very real loneliness that tends to arise when people prioritize their careers over personal relationships."

Lin's character design was partly inspired by Han Young Ja, a longtime friend and colleague of Konietzko and DiMartino. Elements of her design also came from Marlene Dietrich as the creators wanted her "to have a tough and natural beauty". Lin's design was collaborated on by DiMartino and Joaquim Dos Santos.

=== Jinora ===
Jinora (voiced by Kiernan Shipka) is an airbender and astral projectionist. She is the first child and eldest daughter of Tenzin and Pema, and the granddaughter of Katara and Avatar Aang. She has a major role starting in season 2. Unlike her rambunctious siblings, Jinora is a reasonable and disciplined airbender who takes her spiritual duties seriously. Unlike her father, Jinora has a natural affinity for spirits and is able to communicate with the spirits in the Spirit World from the physical world. In season 2, when Korra needed to enter the Spirit World to close the spirit portals before Harmonic Convergence, Jinora became Avatar Korra's guide into the Spirit World. In the season 3 finale "Venom of the Red Lotus", Jinora leads the new airbenders in creating a giant cyclone and she saves Korra, earning her airbending tattoos and the title airbending master from her father, assuming a permanent leadership role in the new Air Nomads. She entered a romantic relationship with Kai on season 4. Jinora is capable of astral projection, an advanced airbending technique combined with spirituality; when using this ability, her spirit is capable of teleportation. She can also track down people by locking on to their energy.

Oliver Sava of The A.V. Club described Jinora's role in the series as being very similar to Katara's in the original Avatar series: "a sweet, but powerful bending master in the early throes of puberty. That connection is accentuated by her romance with Kai, who is clearly carved from the Aang mold".

== Supporting characters and organizations ==
=== Known Avatar incarnations ===
The Avatar Cycle follows the cycles of the seasonal order of Earth's climate, as each element represents a season: Winter (Water), Spring (Earth), Summer (Fire) and Fall (Air).

Appearing Avatar: The Last Airbender

- Avatar Roku (voiced by James Garrett as an old man in the animated series, Keone Young in The Legend of Aang, Andrew Caldwell as a young man in the animated series, portrayed by C. S. Lee in season one of the live-action series, Lawrence Kao in season two of the live-action series) is Aang's immediate past life, a firebender Avatar, serving as his spiritual advisor. In Book Three, it is revealed that Roku's aiding Aang is motivated by his guilt over failing to stop his childhood friend Sozin (with whom he happened to share a birthday), later the Fire Lord of Roku's time, from his campaign of war. Roku is also the grandfather of Ursa and the great-grandfather of Zuko and Azula. In the live-action film, Roku's role as Aang's guide is assumed by the Dragon Spirit (John Noble).
  - Fang (vocal effects provided by Dee Bradley Baker) was Avatar Roku's dragon-animal guide. His spirit, with help from Hei Bai, guided Aang to Roku's Island and helped Aang achieve a connection with Roku. Fang died protecting Roku from a pyroclastic flow caused by the eruption of the volcano on Roku's Island.
- Avatar Kyoshi (虛子; Xū Zǐ (voiced by Jennifer Hale in the animated series, portrayed by Yvonne Chapman in the live-action series) was the earthbender Avatar preceding Roku, 412 years before the start of the series. Being straightforward and often cold in personality, Kyoshi is described as a gigantic woman, possessing the largest feet of any Avatar, and lived to be 230 years old. She is considered a legend. Her traditional weapons are golden war fans which were later adopted by the Kyoshi Warriors of Kyoshi Island, along with her attire and fighting style. She detached Kyoshi Island from the mainland to defy a self-proclaimed conqueror. Kyoshi was also responsible for the establishment of the Dai Li. According to The Legend of Korra: Turf Wars, Kyoshi is believed to have been bisexual. This would later be confirmed by the novel The Rise of Kyoshi.
- Avatar Kuruk (voiced by Jim Meskimen in the animated series, portrayed by Meegwun Fairbrother in the live-action series) preceded Kyoshi. He was the waterbender Avatar before Korra. A self-described "go-with-the-flow" personality, he lived in a time of relative peace and stability. Kuruk later suffered for being inattentive when the spirit Koh the Face Stealer stole the face of his true love. Kuruk spent the rest of his life hunting down Koh, but failed to take revenge. Having been afflicted with a spiritual sickness from fighting dark spirits, his life force was drained, ultimately leading to his death at the young age of 33.
- Avatar Yangchen (voiced by Tress MacNeille in the animated series, portrayed by Dichen Lachman in the live-action series) preceded Kuruk. She was the Air Nomad Avatar before Aang. Unlike the other Avatars, who advised Aang to end the Fire Lord's threat to world peace without hesitation, Yangchen understood Aang's reluctance to kill Fire Lord Ozai due to the Air Nomad culture of pacifism. However, she still reminded Aang that the Avatar's priority is to the world, rather than spiritual enlightenment.

Appearing in The Kyoshi's Novels

- Avatar Szeto preceded Yangchen. He was the firebender Avatar before Roku. He first appeared to Aang in a spiritual vision directed by Avatar Roku, in which he lavabended the magma from four volcanoes while in the Avatar State. He was named in The Shadow of Kyoshi, where he was described as living in an era of immense crisis that threatened to destroy the Fire Nation, and rose to Grand Advisor to strengthen the Fire Nation's government, restore economic balance, and set up programs to aid the poor and needy, becoming a revered figure with festivals in his honor following his death.

Appearing in The Legend of Korra

- Avatar Wan (voiced by Steven Yeun) was the first Avatar who lived 10,000 years prior to Avatar Korra's time. After obtaining the power of fire from his city's Lion Turtle to gather food, he instead abandons the hunting party to, with several others, rob Chu the Elder of his food stores. Everyone else escapes, but Wan is caught. Chu the Elder then banishes Wan to the Spirit Wilds for refusing to reveal the identities of his co-conspirators. The Lion Turtle allows Wan to keep the power of fire. Wan learned to live among the spirits and protected them from hostile humans. After being tricked into freeing the dark spirit Vaatu, Wan accompanied the light spirit Raava to track down and defeat Vaatu. Along the way, Wan acquired the ability to bend the other three elements of Air, Water, and Earth, eventually becoming the first Avatar as he merged with Raava during the Harmonic Convergence.

Appearing in Avatar Aang: The Last Airbender

- Avatar Sonam (voiced by Frieda Pinto) was an Airbender Avatar and is considered forgotten, even by other incarnations of the Avatar, with her being blocked from being seen and communicated with by Aang. She is revealed to have overseen a golden age for Airbenders, establishing them as a peacekeeping force throughout the world, and even creating more of them using her staff which could channel spiritual powers and make benders from non-benders. However, the resulting conflicts resulted in the deaths of many airbenders, which traumatized her disciple, Tagah. Tagah attempted to convince her to make more benders and to overthrow the other nations in a bid for supremacy, but when she refused, he proceeded to attack and mortally wound her before she sealed him away. She then proceeded to hide her staff only to be accessed with the powers of the Avatar, and proceeded to block herself from the other Avatars in an act of shame. After Aang deals with Tagah, Sonam is reconnected with the other Avatar selves.
- Avatar Xian (voiced by Ke Huy Quan) was an earthbender Avatar sometime after Sonam but before Szeto. He an eccentric, having issues with bare feet. He was the only Avatar who held some vague knowledge about Sonam and was able to provide to Aang.

Never seen

- Avatar Gun
- Avatar Salai
- Avatar Zalir

=== Spirit World Denizens ===
The Legend of Korra introduced the concept of dark spirits, spirits who have become unbalanced due to the influence of the spirit of darkness and chaos, Vaatu. Co-creator Bryan Konietzko designed how the spirits would look in various states: in the 'dark' state, they were "rough and jagged...with deep, jewel-like colors on the body and a bright pattern for the face"; in 'neutral' state, they were "smoother and less menacing"; and in 'light' state, their colors were a "negative image" of the 'dark' state.

After the events of season 2 of The Legend of Korra, spirits become a more regular fixture in the series, often seen floating around in the background. Co-executive producer Joaquim Dos Santos noted that some of the spirit designs were inspired by the works of Studio Ghibli, while "others were just a fun way for the designers to cut loose and create with a sense of whimsy."

Appearing in Avatar: The Last Airbender

- Tui (推, 月神; Tuī, Yuè Shén) and La (拉; Lā) are respectively the Moon (Tui) and Ocean (La) Spirits who traveled into the physical world and remained there. The two spirits assumed the form of koi that occupied the Spirit Oasis within the Northern Water Tribe's capital city. The two spirits play an important role in waterbending, information that Admiral Zhao learned and used to kill Tui to permanently remove waterbending. However, empowered by Aang in his Avatar State, La assumed its true form to drive off the Fire Nation invasion force before learning that Tui is revived by Yue's sacrifice. On its way back to the Spirit Oasis, finding the man who murdered Tui, La dragged Zhao into the depths. It would be later revealed in the Legend of Korra that La disposed of Zhao in the Spirit World's Fog of Lost Souls. The push and pull swimming motion of Tui and La, in their koi forms, resemble the Chinese philosophical symbol of Yin and Yang. Their resemblance to the symbol is more than coincidental, as the two spirits embody the symbol's meaning.
- Koh the Face Stealer (voiced by Erik Todd Dellums in the animated series, George Takei in the live-action series) is an ancient Spirit who steals the faces of his victims unless they are expressionless. One of Koh's victims was the beloved of Avatar Kuruk as a means to put the Avatar in his place for letting his guard down during peace time. During his time at the Northern Water Tribe, Aang met with Koh as he knew the identities of the Moon and Ocean spirits. In Avatar: The Last Airbender – The Search, it is revealed that Koh is the estranged son of the Mother of Faces, who can restore her son's victims to normal or alter their appearance.
- Wan Shi Tong (萬知堂; Wàn Zhī Táng) (voiced by Héctor Elizondo in the animated series, Randall Duk Kim in the live-action series) is a powerful owl-like Spirit, who claims to know ten thousand things who brought his library into the physical world, its content provided by his knowledge-seeking foxes, to help people better themselves through his collection. However, as a result of Zhao learning of the Ocean and Moon Spirits, Wan Shi Tong became disillusioned with humans for using his knowledge in their conflict. After Aang and his friends lie to acquire information on the Day of the Black Sun, despite their just reasons, Wan Shi Tong takes his library back to the Spirit World with humans no longer allowed, with the exception of Ba Sing Se Professor Zei who decided to live in the library. In the sequel series, Wan Shi Tong becomes an ally to Unalaq and played a role in the abduction of Aang's granddaughter Jinora, though he is shocked by Unalaq's true intentions.
- Hei Bai (黑白; Hēi Bái) (vocal effects provided by Dee Bradley Baker) is a black and white forest spirit that sometimes takes the form of a docile Giant panda, but can also change into a vicious giant four-armed spirit-monster when enraged. He is the protector of the Earth Kingdom's forests. He was first seen terrorizing the Senlin Village and blaming the occupants for the destruction of his nearby forest, not knowing it was caused by the Fire Nation. When Aang eventually calmed him down, he helped Aang make a connection to Avatar Roku's spirit and showed him a vision of Sozin's Comet. He is last seen guiding Avatar Aang out of the Spirit World when Aang was at the Northern Water Tribe.
- Lion Turtles (variously voiced by Kevin Michael Richardson, Jim Cummings, and Stephen Stanton) are gigantic lion-and-turtle hybrid creatures that are similar in size to the island turtles. They are the source-vessel of the Elemental Bending that is present throughout the series. Each Lion Turtle represents a specific element, and thus can only give bending related to that element. They are viewed as deities, and are thus the supreme authority of the Four Nations. Before the establishment of the Four Nations, they served as Lion-Turtle Cities, with an entire city on the back of their shells. Using Raava The Light Spirit, they granted Avatar Wan the ability to bend all four elements. It is unknown exactly what happened to them after they decided to leave the world in Wan's protection, only that one decided to remain and grant Avatar Aang spiritual bending.

The Legend of Korra

- Raava (voiced by April Stewart) and Vaatu (voiced by Jonathan Adams) are respectively the primal spirits of harmony, peace and light; and of chaos, strife and darkness. Vaatu is the other half of Raava, and vice versa. Their battle was a visual reference to the Chinese Yin Yang symbol, a similar reference was made in the original series with the Ocean and Moon spirits' koi form (see below). Raava is fused with Wan to become the Avatar Spirit. She is one of the oldest known spirits, having existed over ten thousand lifetimes before the appearance of the first humans. She and Vaatu, spent much of their existence combating each other, at least since the Harmonic Convergence in 19,829 BG, with neither able to fully vanquish the other. Even if Raava were to destroy Vaatu and usher in a new era of peace, what little darkness existed in Raava would magnify until Vaatu was reborn and burst forth, beginning the cycle again. The reverse would happen to Vaatu if he were victorious over Raava. The era of Raava encompasses the time period prior to the beginning of the Avatar Cycle around 9,829 BG, when Wan became the first Avatar. During the Harmonic Convergence in 9,829 BG, Raava permanently merged her essence with Wan's, creating The Avatar Spirit. Destined to be merged with a different human spirit every life time and reincarnate as the Avatar, creating the Avatar cycle according to the order of seasons; Summer (Fire), Fall (Air), Winter (Water), Spring (Earth). After her demise in 171 AG, Raava lost her connection to Wan and all the Avatars after him, but was able to merge again with Korra, restoring the Avatar spirit.
- Aye-aye Spirit (voiced by Jason Marsden) is a guardian of the Spirit Oasis that Avatar Wan first stumbled upon after his banishment into the Spirit Wilds. Though refusing to let him in at first, the Spirit developed a bond with Wan, whom he nicknamed ''Stinky'', and allowed Wan to live among them. Aye-aye also taught Wan about spirits.

=== United Republic of Nations ===
The United Republic of Nations is a sovereign state founded by Avatar Aang and Fire Lord Zuko after the events of the original series as a haven for immigrants from all four nations. Its capital is the 1920s-inspired metropolis, Republic City. Its inhabitants were designed to reflect the multiculturalism of the city, such as firebender Mako and earthbender Bolin, brothers whose late mother and father hailed from the Fire Nation and Earth Kingdom respectively.

The Legend of Korra

- President Raiko (萊科, 雷光; Lái Kē, Léi Guāng) (voiced by Spencer Garrett) is a nonbender native to Republic City and the first democratically elected president of the United Republic of Nations. Raiko was elected by the nonbending majority after the dissolution of the United Republic Council as a result of the Equalists movement in season 1. According to comics, events in seasons 3 and 4 diminished his popularity and was succeeded by Zhu Li.
- Sir Iknik Blackstone Varrick (法力克; Fǎ Lì Kè) (voiced by John Michael Higgins) is an eccentric and charismatic nonbending billionaire shipping magnate. Born in the Southern Water Tribe to a poor seal hunter, Varrick built Varrick Global Industries from a single canoe into a global enterprise and is always looking for ways to expand his business empire. Varrick enjoys gallivanting across the globe on his enormous yacht and flaunting his extravagant lifestyle, at the expense of his assistant, Zhu Li.

Varrick was introduced in the second season as a comedic character who represented the prosperity of the Southern Water Tribe. He masterminded a civil war between the Northern and Southern Water Tribes, but his attempt to draw the United Republic into the war led to his arrest. Varrick managed to escape from prison during Unalaq's attack on Republic City at the end of season 2. In the season 3 episode "The Metal Clan", it is revealed that he had settled down in Zaofu as the head of the city's technology division. In season 4, Varrick joined Kuvira on her quest to reunite the Earth Kingdom. Unwilling to weaponize spirit energy for her, Varrick eventually deserted her army and helped Team Avatar to stop her from conquering Republic City. After Kuvira was defeated, Varrick and Zhu Li get married in the series finale "The Last Stand".

Varrick was well-received, with critics praising the character's charisma and Higgins' voice acting. Ed Liu of ToonZone News wrote that Varrick "may be the Avatar franchise's most fascinatingly ambiguous character yet...The audience is kept as baffled and off-guard by Varrick as the characters on the show". Liu noted that the character had hidden depth despite "[seeming] like an oddball combination of Howard Hughes, Steve Jobs, and Andy Kaufman, and his flamboyant animation is matched by John Michael Higgins' enormously entertaining vocal performance." Zach Blumenfeld of Paste magazine ranked Varrick as the eighth best character from the Avatar franchise, writing:

He's consistently the funniest character on The Legend of Korra, combining the wackiness of The Last Airbender's Bumi with the mechanical genius and motormouth of Tony Stark. But more importantly, he's probably the most modern character in the entire Avatar universe: a war profiteer and robber baron who slowly discovers a conscience buried under his previous selfish motives. Varrick's charisma and ruthlessness allow Korra to address such topics as propaganda, the military-industrial complex and weapons of mass destruction in a light-hearted way. He contributes enormously to the series' vivacious, faux-1920s aesthetic, and he's almost impossible to dislike.

John Michael Higgins described the character as "part Rupert Murdoch, part Thomas Edison, part Bozo the Clown."

- Zhu Li Moon (朱莉月; Zhū Lì Yuè) (voiced by Stephanie Sheh) is a nonbender native to Republic City. Initially introduced as a minor character who was Varrick's highly competent personal assistant that served as comedic relief, Zhu Li's narrative role is greatly expanded in season 4 when she seemingly betrays Varrick to work for Kuvira as a ploy to sabotage Kuvira's weapon. In the season 4 episode "Kuvira's Gambit", Zhu Li finally stands up for herself and demands to be treated as Varrick's equal, after years of being unappreciated by him. Varrick and Zhu Li subsequently marry in the series finale "The Last Stand", and she is elected as the new President of the United Republic of Nations, succeeding President Raiko.
- General Iroh II (voiced by Dante Basco) is the youngest general in United Forces history and the commander of the navy's First Division. He is the son of Fire Lord Izumi, the grandson of Lord Zuko, and named after his grandfather's uncle Iroh. A firebending master and skilled military leader, Iroh played a crucial role in the battle for Republic City in season 1, in which he fought on despite losing his fleet.
- Tarrlok (voiced by Dee Bradley Baker and by Nicholas Braico and Zach Callison when young) was the representative for the Northern Water Tribe on the United Republic Council and also served as its chairman. He is the son of Yakone, a crime boss in Aang's time who was also a bloodbender. After escaping to the north, Yakone started a family, with his wife giving birth to Tarrlok and Amon who was born as Noatak. After Yakone learned that his sons could waterbend, he become consumed by revenge and trained them to bloodbend, despite them being hesitant, with Tarrlok in particular hating it. The adult Tarrlok became a politician and member of the United Republic Council to get revenge for his father but eventually saw the error of his ways after Amon took his bending. At the end of the season 1 finale, Tarrlok kills himself and his brother Amon by blowing up their speedboat with an Equalist glove to atone for their past mistakes and end Yakone's legacy once and for all.
- Tahno (voiced by Rami Malek) is a minor antagonist in season 1. He is a waterbender and the captain of the Wolf-bats, the rival championship probending team to Korra, Mako and Bolin's Fire Ferrets. Tahno is a ruthless probender whose bending was later removed by Amon. He makes a cameo in the series finale.

Co-creator Bryan Konietzko drew the first concept art for Tahno in 2010. Supervising producer Ki-Hyun Ryu then designed the character based on Konietzko's initial concept, with Konietzko adding minor tweaks to the final design. Tahno's character was largely inspired by Japanese kickboxer Kizaemon Saiga, who is known for his "ridiculously over the top" antics.

- Shiro Shinobi (voiced by Jeff Bennett) is the fast-talking probending match announcer in season 1. He also does the voice-overs for the short recaps during the opening sequence of each episode.

=== Earth Kingdom ===
Appearing in Avatar: The Last Airbender

- Suki (voiced by Jennie Kwan in the animated series, portrayed by Maria Zhang in the live-action series) is the leader of the exclusively female Kyoshi Warriors, a sect established by the Avatar incarnation of the same name. She is an exceptionally skilled fighter, first meeting Team Avatar when they visited her home of Kyoshi Island, where she captured the intruders. She also humiliated Sokka, causing him to change his chauvinistic ways, eventually striking up a friendship as she taught him how to fight. The two later reunited in Book Two, where she and Sokka began to date.

Later in Book Two, Suki and the Kyoshi Warriors encountered and fought Azula, after which they were defeated and imprisoned. She was liberated by Sokka and Zuko in Book Three, and remained with the protagonists thereafter.

Suki joined Toph and Sokka to disable the Fire Nation's air force. The other Kyoshi Warriors were released after the war and allowed Ty Lee to join them. She later served with Ty Lee as Zuko's bodyguards after the war ended, reuniting with Sokka on several occasions.

- Earth King Kuei (voiced by Phil LaMarr in the animated series, portrayed by Justin Chien in the live-action series), the 52nd Hou-Ting Dynasty-monarch of the Earth Kingdom. In his first appearance, he is shown to have been tricked by his chancellor, who kept the war with the Fire Nation a secret from him. Upon learning of the war, the king joined forces with the Avatar and arrested his chancellor. After the Fire Nation's invasion, he left to travel the world with his pet bear Bosco (which happens to be one of few non-hybridized real animals in the series) before resuming the throne sometime after the series ended. In The Legend of Korra, Kuei ceded the land that the United Republic was built on. In the live-action series, Long Feng and an intimidated Sung lie to Kuei stating that the Avatar and his friends can't be trusted. After this confrontation, Kuei tells Sung that he expects some reports from the wall. When Aang is defeated by Azula, Kuei was last seen in his garden watching Appa fly Aang's group away as the Fire Nation marches into Ba Sing Se.
- Haru (voiced by Michael Dow) is an Earthbender that Sokka, Aang, and Katara meet in Book One, and whom they assist freeing his father and other Earthbenders from the Fire Nation. In Book Three, he reappears in an invasion of the Fire Nation alongside other characters. After the invasion fails, Haru leaves with Aang and his group for the Western Air Temple, but is separated from them during Azula's attack. He is reunited with his father at the end of the finale.
- Tyro (voiced by Kevin Michael Richardson) is an Earthbender and the father of Haru. In Book One, he and many other Earthbenders escape from a Fire Nation prison thanks to his son along with Katara, Aang and Sokka. In Book Three, he later joins the invasion of the Fire Nation with his son, but is captured after the invasion fails. He is seen with Haru at the end of the finale.
- The Mechanist (voiced by René Auberjonois in the animated series, portrayed by Danny Pudi in the live-action series) is a brilliant and eccentric inventor in the Earth Kingdom, who led his people to take up residence in the abandoned Northern Air Temple when their village was destroyed by a flood. Unfortunately, his abilities come to the attention of the Fire Nation and he is coerced into developing a number of machines, redeeming himself after he breaks the arrangement and helps Aang repel the Fire Nation when they raid the temple. Because of his scientific approach to the world, he becomes friends with Sokka, and they develop a number of devices together. He later aids the invasion on the Day of the Black Sun with numerous new inventions, including waterbending-powered submarines. When the invasion fails, he is captured and later reunited with his son Teo after the war. In the live-action series, the Mechanist was given the name of Sai. Aang encounters Sai in Omashu.
- Teo (voiced by Daniel Samonas in the animated series, portrayed by Lucian-River Chauhan in the live-action series) is the Mechanist's son, rendered paraplegic by a flood. A kind-hearted, respectful, and honest boy, he soon becomes friends with Aang. After discovering that his father has been reluctantly creating machines for the Fire Nation, Teo aids Aang repelling Fire Nation raiders. He returns during the invasion of the Day of the Black Sun, but is forced to separate from his father when the Avatar's group is forced to surrender. He accompanies Aang to the Western Air Temple and befriends Haru and the Duke before the Avatar's group is forced to flee when Azula attacks the temple. He is reunited with his father after the war. In the live-action series, Aang encounters Teo in Omashu.
- June and Nyla are a pair of super-effective bounty hunters who travel the Earth Kingdom and were employed by Zuko in his search for Aang and later for Uncle Iroh. June (voiced by Jennifer Hale in the animated series, portrayed by Arden Cho in the live-action series) hunts her prey with the help of her mount 'Nyla', which is totally blind but possesses a heightened sense of smell. June is confident and self-assured, and possesses impressive physical strength. Nyla (vocal effects provided by Dee Bradley Baker) is a female Shirshu (an immense, star-nosed mole-like predator) who served as the mount and companion of the bounty hunter June. A characteristic of her species is that Nyla's tongue contains neurotoxins that temporarily paralyze an opponent/target. Also like other Shirshu, Nyla has no eyes and "sees" by her powerful scent receptors; a trait that backfired when it was utilized by a fleeing Sokka by tipping filled perfume-jugs into Nyla's path to confuse her. Aang's group later enlist June to help them find Iroh. In the live-action series, June ambushes Aang at the Fire Temple and brings him to Zuko and Iroh.
- Grand Secretariat Long Feng (voiced by Clancy Brown in the animated series, portrayed by Chin Han in the live-action series) is the intelligent Grand Secretariat of Ba Sing Se and chancellor to the Earth King, making him the power behind the throne, and the secondary antagonist of Book Two. As leader of the Dai Li, Long Feng uses propaganda to conceal the Hundred Year War while silencing anyone who disrupts the order. Once exposed, Long Feng is remanded to the dungeon as one Dai Li agent later informs that the Dai Li are still secretly loyal to him. Long Feng allies himself with Azula upon being temporarily released in a scheme to use her to pull a coup on the Earth King, only to find his men are more willing to follow Azula's commands than his. His status afterwards is unknown.
- The Dai Li are Ba Sing Se's secret police and cultural enforcers, that acted under Long Feng and then Azula. In "Sozin's Comet, Part 3: Into the Inferno" at the time when she was preparing for her coronation, a paranoid Azula had the Dai Li banished from her castle. In the sequel series, the Dai Li continue as an antagonistic form against the Avatar due to being the loyal enforcers of Earth Queen Hou-Ting. It is revealed in the secret episode that the Dai Li was founded by Avatar Kyoshi.
  - The unnamed Head of the Dai Li (voiced by Jason Charles Miller in "City of Walls and Secrets" and "Lake Laogai", André Sogliuzzo in "Sozin's Comet, Part 3: Into the Inferno") is the spokesperson for the Dai Li. He is the one who tells Long Feng that the Dai Li are still secretly loyal to him after Long Feng was remanded ot the dungeon. The unnamed Head of the Dai Li was also present when Azula had the Dai Li banished from her castle.
  - The unnamed Dai Li Sergeant (voiced by Gary Cole) is loyal to Earth Queen Hou-Ting.
- Joo Dee (voiced by Lauren Tom in the animated series, portrayed by Amanda Zhou in the live-action series) is a woman in Ba Sing Se who appears as the protagonists' hostess, but later turns out to be one of many female agents that the Dai Li brainwash into obedient servants. Joo Dee shows little emotion at all. Despite seeming brainwashed, she understands the city's situation. In the live-action series, the second Joo Dee (portrayed by Emma Yi) was brought in outside of the palace by Long Feng after Aang evaded the original one while chasing a supposed Dai Li agent and the third one (portrayed by Arielle Tuliao) was attacked by Azula.
- Lao Beifong (voiced by Cam Clarke in the animated series, portrayed by Shintaro Kanaoya in the live-action series) is a businessman and father of Toph. When Toph travels with Aang, Lao enlists Xin Fu and Master Yu to bring her back to him, but they were not successful. After the Hundred Years' War he became a co-founder of the Earthen Fire Refinery.
- Poppy Beifong (voiced by Gabrielle Carteris in the animated series, portrayed by Crystal Yu in the live-action series) is the mother of Toph.
- Xin Fu (辛富; Xīn Fù) (voiced by Marc Graue) was a promoter and host of an earthbending prizefighting ring who later becomes a bounty hunter, hired by Toph's father to bring her home. He works with Earthbending instructor turned bounty hunter Master Yu to accomplish this. While searching for Toph, he also briefly pursues Zuko and Iroh. He succeeds in capturing Toph in a metal box, but she manages to escape by creating Metalbending and proceeds to seal him and Master Yu inside. Neither is shown again after that. The three-part follow-up book series called "The Rift" revealed that they escaped and gave up going after Toph. In the live-action series, he was credited as the emcee (portrayed by Dave Dimapilis) and had a minor role.
- Master Yu (余; Yú) (voiced by Sab Shimono) is an instructor at an Earth-bending academy, as well as Toph Beifong's personal Earth-bending teacher. At first, he was unaware of Toph's prowess, considering that he saw her as blind and helpless. Later he, along with Xin Fu, is contracted by Toph's father as bounty hunters to bring her home. When they succeeded in capturing Toph, she manages to trap Master Yu and Xin Fu in the metal box with her Metalbending. Neither is shown again after that. The three-part follow-up book series called "The Rift" revealed that they escaped and gave up going after Toph. In the live-action series, Master Yu is replaced with Ji Shen (portrayed by Andy Yu) who serves as the personal secretary for the Beifong family.
- The Boulder (大塊石; Dà Kuài Shí) (voiced by Mick Foley in the animated series, portrayed by Kelemete Misipeka in the live-action series) is an earthbender first seen as a prizefighter in Book Two. The Boulder re-appears in Book Three during the attempt to invade the Fire Nation during the Day of Black Sun. He speaks of himself in the third person, and his name is thought to be a parody of The Rock. In the live-action series, the Boulder's Book Two role was expanded where he was sent by the Beifongs in order to reclaim Toph only for him and Ji Shen to be defeated by Aang and Toph.
- Big Bad Hippo (voiced by Kevin Michael Richardson) is an opponent of Boulder's in an Earthbending match in Book Two, and later appears with him in the invasion of the Fire Nation in Book Three during the Day of Black Sun. He is a tall, heavy man with 4 especially prominent teeth, and is possibly a parody of King Hippo of the Punch-Out!! franchise.
- Jin (voiced by Marcella Lentz-Pope, portrayed by Kelsey Lopes in the live-action series) was a girl from Ba Sing Se who developed a crush on Zuko and asked him out on a date. Like most people in the Lower Ring, Jin's parents were refugees who had moved to the city; though they struggled most of their lives, they were strong and able to provide for their family. On her date with Zuko, they go to a restaurant where she attempts to make conversation, and Zuko creates a story about his life in response. They later go to the town square to sit by the lit up fountain, but to Jin's disappointment, the lanterns are not lit. Zuko orders her to close her eyes and lights the lanterns. When she opens them, she is pleasantly surprised. She attempts to kiss him, but Zuko pulls away. She then reattempts the kiss, and Zuko returns it. He then runs off. She makes a brief cameo during episode one of book three, and is never seen again.
- Aunt Wu (voiced by Tsai Chin) was an elderly citizen of Makapu Village who worked as a fortune teller. The people of Makapu were so confident in her abilities that they abandoned going up the nearby volcano's crater to check if it would erupt, instead relying on Aunt Wu's predictions. Well-regarded for her free and accurate readings, every prediction she made was taken as gospel by the village at large, as well as Aang and Katara. Her methods of divination ran from palmistry to oracle bones and cloud reading. She was helped in her hut by her assistant, Meng. Though Sokka was heavily skeptical of her "fortune telling", he indirectly helped her prediction become a reality, such as when he helped convince Wu of her false prediction when Aang redirected the clouds to alert the town to a volcanic eruption, which happened at that instant. Aang prevented the lava from destroying the town by redirecting the flow, cementing Wu's prediction as a reality, as her exact words were: "The Town will NOT be destroyed by the volcano this year."
- The Cabbage Merchant (菜販; Cài Fàn) (voiced and portrayed by James Sie in both animated and live-action series, Ken Jeong in Avatar Aang: The Last Airbender) is a character (never directly given a name) that appears occasionally throughout Book One and Book Two, used mainly for comic relief. The cabbage merchant was an Earth Kingdom salesman who repeatedly had his cabbages destroyed or damaged. His only speaking parts throughout the original series is to shout his catchphrase "My cabbages!": provoked first by the Earth kingdom city of Omashu's import control earthbenders; secondly by Aang and the Omashu mail delivery service; and again by Aang chased by pirates. In Book Two, his cabbages are spoilt by a 'platypus-bear' at the Ba Sing Se ferry boat center and again by Aang when the latter relocates a zoo. In Book Three, "a surprisingly knowledgeable merchant of cabbage", though never seen, supplies the story of a theatrical play mimicking, and in some scenes mocking, the protagonists' adventures. In the sequel series, another man named Lau Gan-Lan (also voiced by James Sie) runs a company named Cabbage Corp, founded by the Cabbage Merchant; Avatar: The Last Airbender - The Rift reveals that he became interested in machinery shortly after opening a cabbage-themed restaurant.
- The Blind Badgermoles are badger/mole-like creatures who are revealed to be the original Earthbenders. They are giant wild creatures that burrow tunnels using Earthbending. It is unknown exactly how many of them are there, though 2 Badgermoles have made recurring appearances throughout the series. They found a helpless young blind Toph crying and wandering the caves one night. Though they are aggressive wild creatures, they felt an immediate bond towards Toph because of their shared disability with her, and they immediately took her under their tutelage and taught her how to use Earthbending as a means of sight.
- Oma and Shu (奧瑪; Ào Mǎ) and (舒; Shū) are the first humans to be taught earth-bending by the Badgermoles. The lovers created a maze of tunnels underneath the mountains that divided their feuding villages, in order to secretly meet up. Shu was killed in the war between their villages, and from her grief, Oma displayed her potent earth-bending powers, but instead of destroying the two villages, she declared the war between them over and together they build a city where they could coexist. The city was named Omashu.
- The Sandbender Tribes are Earthbenders who specialize in bending sand. They are indigenous to the Si Wong Desert within the Earth Kingdom. They are divided into separate tribes. Team Avatar utilized one of their sandsailers (a raft built for sailing on sand) while they were stranded in the desert (Toph discovered it by accident), while searching for Appa, who was stolen by Sandbenders.
  - Sha-Mo (voiced by Bill Bolender) is the leader of his Sandbender tribe.
  - Ghashiun (voiced by Paul McKinney) is the son of Sha-Mo and one of the people who abducted Appa.
- Foggy Swamp Tribe are the country-like folk of the foggy swamp. They use Waterbending to control the moisture in plants to control them in the swamp. The tribe also uses Waterbending to propel their wooden boats to catch food as demonstrated in season 2 when the two of its members attempted to capture Appa. They first appear in season two as hunters, and later in season three to help with the invasion of the Fire Nation during the Day of Black Sun. They are imprisoned when the invasion fails, but are released in the finale.
  - Huu (voiced by William H. Bassett) is an elderly Waterbender who is a member of the Foggy Swamp Tribe. Utilizing the water in the swamp plants, Huu would masquerade as a swamp monster to protect his swamp.
  - Tho (voiced by Carlos Alazraqui) is a member of the Foggy Swamp Tribe.
  - Due (voiced by Carlos Alazraqui) is a member of the Foggy Swamp Tribe.
- Fei (portrayed by Madison Hu) is a farmer who is exclusive to the live-action television series. Zuko stayed at her house after briefly separating from Iroh.
  - Peng (portrayed by Rickie Wang) is the younger brother of Fei who Zuko saves from bandits demanding a toll.
- Lau Wong (portrayed by Vincent Tong) is a Ba Sing Se inhabitant exclusive to the live-action series. He is an opportunitist who blackmails Toph over the allegations that her parents have been selling weapons to the Fire Nation.

Appearing in The Legend of Korra

- Kuvira (古維拉; Gǔ Wéilā) (voiced by Zelda Williams) is a master metalbender and the main villain of season 4. An orphan taken into the Metal Clan by Suyin Beifong (at the age of 8) the prodigal bender served as the captain of Zaofu's guard. Following the chaos in the Earth Kingdom after the Earth Queen's assassination, Kuvira earned the trust of the world leaders by stabilizing Ba Sing Se and was appointed as the nation's provisional leader. She subsequently set out to forcefully reunite the rest of the fractured kingdom with her army, denouncing the authority of Prince Wu in favor of an "Earth Empire" under her dictatorship, earning her the title of the "Great Uniter". Her reign came to an end, however, after she was defeated in Republic City and imprisoned. She was also engaged to Baatar Jr., who left Zaofu with her to support her ideals, though ended their relationship when she was willing to sacrifice him to have a chance to end Avatar Korra's life. In Ruins of the Empire, Kuvira was temporarily released into the Avatar's custody and brought a permanent end to the empire she had created by forcing Commander Guan to surrender. In light of her actions and her remorse, Kuvira was sentenced to house arrest at the Beifong estate in Zaofu, like her ex-fiancé, and welcomed back into the Beifong Family.

Kuvira was received well, with reviewers describing her as a sympathetic villain with noble but extremely misguided intentions. The Artifice wrote of Kuvira's motivations: "Kuvira may appear to be a cool and calculating villain on the outside, but much like Princess Azula of Avatar: The Last Airbender, there exists deep resentment and anger beneath that facade. In the series finale, Kuvira reveals the unlikely connection between her desire for world conquest and her personal background. The now-scattered Earth Kingdom is a painful reminder of her rootlessness as an orphan, feeling unwanted and having to construct and carve out her identity all on her own."

Said DiMartino on the conception of Kuvira, "For our fourth and final antagonist, we were looking to have a female character who was physically similar to Korra. We wanted our hero to have to face the shadow version of herself—a woman who was fierce, uncompromising, and a bending heavyweight, Kuvira brought a lot of new story and character possibilities to the table, and I really enjoyed writing the female hero/villain dynamic." DiMartino and Konietzko "took some pages out of history" in crafting Kuvira's villain arc, with DiMartino explaining that, "a lot of [dictatorships] would begin in the way we have Kuvira's story, where they were given power during a time of chaotic disruption, and it was a temporary power." Konietzko added that, "A dictator came from a temporary "okay, you can do whatever you want," because it's such an emergency, and then you're supposed to give it back. Historically, they rarely did that."

The character was designed by Konietzko and Ki-Hyun Ryu. Konietzko noted that "[he] had been wanting to do a military dictator as a villain for a long time, so it was fun to finally play around with what the uniform motifs would be." When designing Kuvira, Konietzko intentionally gave her a "somewhat similar vibe" to Korra, just a bit more intense." To incorporate Kuvira's metal armor in battle, the designers gave her thin strips of metal stacked on her back and upper arms that Kuvira could bend.

- Earth Queen Hou-Ting (voiced by Jayne Taini) was the 53rd monarch of the Earth Kingdom and daughter of Earth King Kuei. Hou-Ting was a tyrannical ruler who oppressed her citizens and used the Dai Li secret police to eliminate dissidents. In an effort to capitalize on the changes brought on by Harmonic Convergence, Hou-Ting ordered the capture of Ba Sing Se's new airbenders and conscripted them into her army. She was assassinated by Zaheer during the insurrection of the Red Lotus in the season 3 episode "Long Live the Queen", resulting in the collapse of the Earth Kingdom.
- Commander Guan (関; Yē) was the head of the Earth Empire's southern forces during the rule of Kuvira, and led an armed holdout following the latter's surrender. A cunning strategist, Guan conspired to restore Earth Empire influence by entering the Gaoling Election of 174 AG according to comics.
- Prince Wu (voiced by Sunil Malhotra) is a great-nephew of the late Earth Queen Hou-Ting and great-grandson of Earth King Kuei. Following the death of his Great Aunt at the hands of Zaheer in season 3, Prince Wu was next in line to the throne. Due to political instability, his coronation was postponed and he was forced to seek refuge in Republic City. In the season 4 episode "The Coronation", Wu was crowned King of the Earth Kingdom. However, his succession was denounced upon Kuvira's declaration as de facto leader of the newly established "Earth Empire", an action that was met with much delight from not just Kuvira's followers but also many of Wu's subjects. After Kuvira's defeat, Wu announced that he was abolishing the monarchy in favor of sovereign states with democratically elected leaders.

On Prince Wu's character, DiMartino said, "Despite Prince Wu's obnoxiousness and arrogance, he's a good guy underneath. We wrote him to be goofy and to annoy Mako, but when he has his breakdown on the fake throne in the restaurant in episode three, he showed his vulnerable side, and his character gained some more depth. It's always fun to write for characters like this, who don't have any social filters and say and do whatever they like." Prince Wu was designed by character designer Christie Tseng and Konietzko. The character's design went through a lot of versions during the concept stage. According to Konietzko, Wu seemed "too cool" in most of them, while Konietzko wanted him to be "more feeble, with less of a chiseled jawline." On Wu's final design, Konietzko noted he was "particularly happy with his fabulously coifed bangs."

=== Fire Nation ===
The Fire Nation is a highly industrialized absolute monarchy ruled by the Fire Lord. One hundred years prior to the events of the series, Fire Lord Sozin declared war on all other regions under the pretense of sharing the Fire Nation's prosperity with the rest of the world, criminalizing dissent in the process. Despite their altruistic claims, the Fire Nation actually adheres to a supremacist ideology, viewing fire above all other elements and treating other benders as second-class citizens, indoctrinating residents to accept this worldview from childhood via propaganda campaigns in state-sponsored entertainment and education. By the start of the series, they have conquered a substantial portion of the world, forming a giant empire that allows them to constantly pursue Aang and his friends during his journey to master the four elements.

After ascending to the throne, Fire Lord Zuko strips away Sozin and Ozai's ideology from Fire Nation society, reversing a century's worth of indoctrination and reorganizing the Fire Nation as a peaceful world power.

Appearing in Avatar: The Last Airbender

- Fire Lord Sozin (蘇進; Sū Jìn) (voiced by Ron Perlman as an old man in the animated series, Lex Lang as a young man in the animated series, portrayed by Hiro Kanagawa in the live-action series) was the Fire Lord who started the war with the other nations, and the great-grandfather of Zuko and Azula. In a flashback, it is shown that he was once friends with Avatar Roku, who happened to share a birthday with him, but disobeyed his edict against war and later permitted his death. With the Avatar no longer there to maintain balance, Sozin wiped out the Air Nomads using the power of a nearby comet, renamed Sozin's Comet in his honour. It is hinted that, in his last moments before death, Sozin regretted his actions.
- Mai (voiced by Cricket Leigh in the animated series, portrayed by Thalia Tran in the live-action series) is an impassive, bored, stoic young noblewoman who, along with Ty Lee, is a friend and accomplice of Azula. She is the elder child of Ukano, the Governor of New Ozai (previously Omashu, and renamed New Ozai). Her primary weapons are throwing knives, darts, and shuriken concealed in her clothing, all of which she can throw with lethal accuracy. Mai eventually becomes Zuko's girlfriend, although he leaves her to join Aang and Team Avatar. She later visits him when he is incarcerated in Boiling Rock prison; upon his escape, Mai shocks everyone by holding off the guards and dueling Azula herself, explaining that her love for Zuko is stronger than her fear of Azula. She is released after Azula's defeat, and reunites with Zuko. However, in Avatar: The Last Airbender - The Promise, she breaks up with Zuko after learning that he has been visiting his imprisoned father without telling her. She later was involved in Avatar: The Last Airbender - Smoke and Shadow, in which she joins forces with Zuko and Aang to deal with the threat of the Kemurikage Spirits and reactionary New Ozai Society led by her estranged father.
- Ty Lee (voiced by Olivia Hack in the animated series, portrayed by Momona Tamada in the live-action series) is cheerful, energetic, and somewhat of a valley girl who, along with Mai, accompanies her childhood friend Azula on her quest. She is one of seven sisters and joined the circus at an early age to appear "different from a matching set". She is a peerless acrobat and can paralyze people or temporarily neutralize their bending powers by striking pressure points in a similar fashion to the martial art style of Dim Mak. In Book Three, she was temporarily imprisoned after she supported Mai and Zuko against Azula, and released when the Fire Lord was defeated. She later joined the Kyoshi Warriors (contradictory to her earlier statement of not wanting to be part of a matching set), whom she had earlier impersonated in Book Two. Ty Lee's chi-blocking techniques were used for nefarious purposes in the sequel series, although it is not clear if there is a direct connection.
- Lo and Li (both voiced by Takayo Fischer in the animated series, both portrayed by Dolly de Leon in the live-action series) are two twin elderly women who are teachers to Princess Azula. Although they can teach firebending, they cannot perform firebending. As revealed in "Sozin's Comet, Part 3: Into the Inferno", neither of them knows who is who when Azula banishes Lo and allows Li to stay.
- On Ji (voiced by Tinashe Kachingwe in the animated series) is a young student in the Fire Nation who helps Aang (under his cover identity, Kuzon) multiple times during his time in the Fire Nation school. She's dating Hide, the troublemaker who picks a fight with Aang.

During the secret cave dance party, she's one of the students who helps cover for Aang, so he can scape from the headmaster.

- Admiral Zhao (formerly Commander) voiced by Jason Isaacs in the animated series, portrayed by Aasif Mandvi in the live-action film, Ken Leung in the live-action series) is a hot-tempered Fire Nation admiral in pursuit of the Avatar, Zuko's first rival and the secondary antagonist of Book One. The rivalry is shown throughout various episodes, including an Agni Kai in the episode The Southern Air Temple, various banters involving mass gloating, and even attempting to kill off Zuko in The Waterbending Master in retaliation for interference in his capture of Aang in The Blue Spirit. He also plans to kill the world's 'Moon Spirit' and thus destroy the waterbending capability of the Northern Water Tribe, in which he fails when Princess Yue becomes the new Moon Spirit to replace the original. Zhao is then dragged underwater to his demise by the vengeful Ocean Spirit. Despite Zhao's demise, he is mentioned in the second season when Wan Shi Tong tells Aang, Katara and Sokka how Zhao tried to read about the moon and ocean spirits so he could defeat the Water Tribes and the third season when Aang tells Katara and Sokka that Zuko rescued him from Zhao in The Blue Spirit while they are considering whether or not to allow Zuko to join their team in the episode The Western Air Temple. In the second season of the sequel series The Legend of Korra, it is revealed that Zhao's spirit was placed in the Fog of Lost Souls, where he became a victim of madness by the time he is encountered by Aang's children, mistaking Tenzin for his father.
- Princess Ursa (爾姝; Ěr Shū) (voiced by Jen Cohn in the animated series, portrayed by Lily Gao in the live-action series) is the mother of Zuko and Azula and the former wife of Fire Lord Ozai, later revealed to be the granddaughter of Avatar Roku. While she made few appearances in the series, Ursa's story is expanded in the sequel comics. As revealed in Avatar: The Last Airbender – The Search, Ursa was in love with an actor named Ikem before she is forced to end their relationship while betrothed to Ozai. Though told that she is to abandon her old life, expecting Ozai to have been intercepting her mail, Ursa secretly wrote letters that included a false letter claiming Zuko was Ikem's child. The false letter caused the rift between Ozai and Zuko, the former claiming to have arranged Ikem's death after the actor mysteriously vanished. When Ursa learned that Ozai was ordered by his father to kill Zuko, she becomes a means for Ozai to have his father murdered before banishing her in exchange for Zuko's life. As revealed in The Search, to forget her time with Ozai and ensure her children's protection, Ursa had the spirit known as the Mother of Faces change her face and alter her memories. Now going by name of Noriko, Ursa married Ikem, who also had his face changed with the name of Noren, and they have a daughter named Kiyi. Zuko finds her years later and despite Azula's attempt on her life, Ursa is welcomed back into her son's life as she is restored to her original self.
- Fire Lord Azulon (voiced by Walker Edmiston) was Sozin's son and Ozai & Iroh's father, and thus Zuko, Azula & Lu Ten's paternal grandfather. He was killed by Ozai in an attempt to revoke Iroh's birthright (as a first-born) after he believed Iroh to be unsuitable for the position considering he lost his son Lu Ten and has no heirs apparent. Upon hearing his conditions for the revoking of the birthright (a son for a son), Princess Ursa interfered and voluntarily poisoned him and offered herself for banishment in order to protect her son Zuko. It was revealed that his granddaughter Azula, and the Gates of the Fire Nation's harbor were named after him. During a flashback of his funeral service, it was mentioned that he was a widower as his wife Ilah (never seen in the series) died before him.
- Prince Lu Ten (路騰; Lù Téng) (voiced by Mae Whitman when young) was the only son, and heir apparent of General Iroh, thus Azula and Zuko's cousin, and Ozai's nephew. His death at the Siege of Ba Sing Se 5 years ago, led to Ozai's decision to usurp Iroh as heir to the throne of the Fire Nation. Iroh was shown still mourning his death in the season 2 episode "Tales of Ba Sing Se" short entitled "The Tale of Iroh".
- Fire Sages (烈火國諸賢; Liè Huǒ Guó Zhū Xián) are a group of elite Fire Nation religious guardians of the Avatar monuments. They are the founders of the Fire Nation, and the leader of the Sages was known as a Fire Lord. However, over the years, the Fire Nation became a monarchy and the title of Fire Lord was reserved for the head of state, thus the beginning of the Fire Nation Royal bloodline. The Sages distanced themselves from the Royal family and began serving the Avatar, but over the hundred years, some of them have soured towards the Avatar for abandoning them and thus started serving the Fire Nation Royal Family again. They alerted Fire Lord Ozai to Avatar Aang's existence when Aang entered the Avatar-state for the first time. The Sages are also the de facto religious authority for the Fire Nation's Royal wedding-, funeral- and coronation ceremonies, as well as identifying the newest Avatar born from the Fire Nation.
  - The Great Sage (voiced by Clement von Franckenstein in the animated series, portrayed by François Chau in the live-action series) is the leader of the Fire Sages.
  - The High Sage (voiced by Keone Young) is a member of the Fire Sages and was responsible for the coronation of the next Fire Lord.
  - Shyu (voiced by Michael Yama in the animated series, portrayed by James Rha in the live-action series) is a Great Sage who helped Aang connect with the spirit of Avatar Roku.
- Ran and Shaw (both vocal effects provided by Dee Bradley Baker) are two colossal red & blue dragons known as the Fire Bending Masters, and they are the last-known live-dragons at the time. As dragons, they are the source of all fire-bending. Iroh faced their judgement and received their teaching and in return, he kept their existence secret from everyone, even going so far as to lie about killing them and adopting the title "Dragon of The West". Both Zuko and Aang faced their judgement and received their teachings.
- The Sun Warriors are the ancient civilization that the Fire Nation descended from that first discovered fire-bending. They are thought to have died out thousands of years before the main events of the series, though they live in secrecy and as protectors of the Fire-bending Masters Ran and Shaw.
  - The unnamed Sun Warrior Chief (voiced by Robert Ito) is the chieftain of the Sun Warriors.
  - Ham Ghao (voiced by Brian Tochi) is a member of the Sun Warriors.
- Combustion Man (previously Sparky Sparky Boom Man; vocal effects provided by Greg Baldwin) is an assassin hired by Prince Zuko to kill Aang and the secondary antagonist of Book Three. His chief weapon is a unique method of Firebending allowing him to generate explosions from a third eye painted on his forehead, whereby he terrorizes the Avatar and his friends. His real name is unknown, though it is implied that Zuko knows his name. He has no speaking parts and shows no mannerism except those suggesting a fierce attachment to his purpose. It is unknown if there is any connection between him and the Korra character P'Li, who demonstrated similar abilities.
- Yon Rha (voiced by Tim Dang) was the Fire Nation commanding officer of the Southern Raiders who killed Katara and Sokka's mother Kya. Later on in the series, Katara seeks out revenge with help from Zuko. She couldn't bring herself to finish him off.
- General Shinu (formerly Colonel Shinu) voiced by Nick Jameson) first appeared as the officer commanding the Yuyan Archers, an elite archer squad. He was later promoted to General, and reported at the Fire Lord's war meeting the day before the eclipse.
- Ember Island Players (餘烬島演員; Yú Jìn Dǎo Yǎn Yuán) are an acting troupe that mimicked the protagonists' adventures thanks to the Merchant of Cabbage documenting the group's adventures. Though not known for their acting, they do put a lot of effort in their productions. Several of the series' main characters are portrayed by the actors in the play including: Katara (actress voiced by Grey DeLisle), Sokka (actor voiced by Scott Menville), Aang (actress voiced by Rachel Dratch), Zuko (actor voiced by Derek Basco), Iroh (actor voiced by John DiMaggio), Suki and the Kyoshi Warriors, Jet (actor voiced by Dee Bradley Baker), King Bumi (actor voiced by John DiMaggio), the Pirates, Blue Spirit (though portrayed as if it was not Zuko's alter ego while Zuko is portrayed as Aang's captor instead of Zhao), La's Avatar-monster form, Toph (actor voiced by John DiMaggio), Zhao, Yue, Azula, Fire Lord Ozai (actor voiced by Dee Bradley Baker), Ty Lee and Mai, The Dai Li and Earth King Kuei Hou-Ting. During the intermission the real Aang, Katara, Sokka, Toph, Suki and Zuko aired their grievances about their portrayals. With the group complaining about Aang's portrayal by a woman, Actor Sokka's unfunny food jokes, Actress Katara being a preachy cry-baby obsessed with hope and Zuko's past mistakes being shoved in his face.
- Kiyi is the daughter of Princess Ursa and Noren/Ikem and Fire Lord Zuko and Princess Azula's half-sister. Having been born after her mother left the Fire Nation Royal Court and assumed a new face and identity, Kiyi possessed no knowledge of her Royal connections or half-siblings and was raised simply until she encountered her maternal half-brother and sister in their search for Ursa. Despite not originally knowing that they shared the same mother, Kiyi quickly gained a close bond with Zuko and readily accepted him as her brother, who she greatly idolized, although she had great trouble adjusting to her mother's new face. Kiyi was later kidnapped by the 'Kemurikage', who were in fact being led by a fugitive Azula, but was later rescued by her brother, Aang, Mai, Kei Lo and Ukano after subsequently unlocking her firebending abilities and accepted her mother's new features.
- Tan (portrayed by Osric Chau) is a Fire Nation resident exclusive to the live-action series who is the leader of a group of Fire Nation rebels opposed to Ozai's leadership. Azula infiltrates their group and leads them into a trap. Tan and those with him are then killed by Ozai.

Appearing in The Legend of Korra

- Fire Lord Izumi (voiced by April Stewart) is Zuko's daughter and only child, and the mother of his grandson Iroh, a general in the United Forces. She is the current Fire Lord in Legend of Korra, as Zuko abdicated his title to her and she sees the safety of her people as her main priority. She is first seen during Prince Wu's coronation ceremony. She is later seen again discussing actions against Kuvira's Empire, refusing to let her Nation get involved in another war under the claim that the Fire Nation had spent too much of its time (the reigns of her grandfather, great-grandfather and great-great-grandfather) fighting the other nations, but agreeing to aid when needed in defending the city.

=== Water Tribe ===
Appearing in Avatar: The Last Airbender

- Chief Hakoda (voiced by André Sogliuzzo in the animated series, portrayed by Joel Montgrand in season one of the live-action series, Adam Beach in season three of the live-action series) is Katara and Sokka's father and the leader of the Southern Water Tribe. Much of Sokka's ingenuity in the show is attributed to Hakoda's teachings. Hakoda went to fight the Fire Nation before the beginning of the series, reappearing later to lead his son's invasion in Book Three.
- Princess Yue (voiced by Johanna Braddy in the animated series, portrayed by Seychelle Gabriel in the live-action film, Amber Midthunder in the live-action series) is the daughter of Chief Arnook of the Northern Water Tribe. When Yue nearly died at birth, her father pleaded with the Moon Spirit to save her life. In Book One, she appears as a sixteen-year-old girl engaged to marry warrior Hahn; but becomes enamoured of Sokka. When the Moon Spirit is killed by Admiral Zhao, Yue gives up mortal existence to become the new Moon Spirit, as the Moon Spirit previously gave her life and Yue felt indebted to the Spirit. In this role, she reappears occasionally in Books Two and Three, including a brief representation in the Ember Island Players episode. The word Yue (月) means "moon" in Mandarin Chinese.
- Kya (voiced by Grey DeLisle in the animated series, portrayed by Rainbow Dickerson in the live-action series) was Hakoda's wife and Sokka and Katara's mother. During the raids on the Southern Tribe, Kya was cornered by one of the raiders, Yon Rha. In order to protect her daughter, the actual last Southern waterbender, Kya lied and claimed she was the bender. Although she believed she would merely be captured, Yon Rha killed Kya. Kya's death has a profound effect on her children, particularly Katara.
- Bato (voiced by Richard McGonagle in the animated series, portrayed by Trevor Carroll in the live-action series) is a friend of Hakoda. He is first seen in Book One, and later takes part in Sokka's invasion of the Fire Nation during Book Three; eventually imprisoned at its failure, and released in the finale. Team Avatar crosses paths with him on the way to the North Pole while he is recovering from injuries at an abbey. While there, he performs an ancient Water Tribe ritual that Sokka misses out on, having been too young when the warriors departed for battle.
- Chief Arnook (voiced by Jon Polito in the animated series, portrayed by Nathaniel Arcand in the live-action series) is the Chief of the Northern Water Tribe in Aang's time, and father of Princess Yue. He helps to defeat the Fire Nation in their raid of the tribe at the end of Book One, but is not seen or mentioned thereafter.
- Kanna (voiced by Melendy Britt in the animated series, portrayed by Katharine Houghton in the live-action film, Casey Camp-Horinek in the live-action series) is Sokka and Katara's paternal grandmother, informally referred to as Gran-Gran. She encouraged them to help Aang on his journey as the Avatar.
- Yagoda (voiced by Lucille Bliss in the animated series, portrayed by Irene Bedard in the live-action series) is a healer for the Northern Water Tribe.
- Hahn (voiced by Benjamin Diskin in the animated series, portrayed by Joel Oulette in the live-action series) is a member of the Northern Water Tribe. He was betrothed to Princess Yue until she died.
- Hama (voiced by Tress MacNeille in the animated series, portrayed by Tantoo Cardinal in the live-action series) was an elderly woman living in the Fire Nation. She was an innkeeper who offered a place to stay to Team Avatar after finding them camping in the woods. She later revealed that she was, at that time, the last waterbender from the Southern Water Tribe, and a childhood friend of Kanna (Katara and Sokka's grandmother) before she was taken prisoner by the Fire Nation. She managed to escape prison by developing a technique called ''Bloodbending'' (water is a prevailing substance in blood), which works in a similar fashion to Puppetry. By controlling the water within the blood of a body, she could forcefully manipulate its movements. She held a grudge against the Fire Nation soldiers who imprisoned her, and thus ''possessed'' and captured Fire Nation citizen who went near the mountain during a full moon. She tricked Katara into learning the technique so that it could be passed on to others, though Katara used it against Hama herself to stop her from controlling Aang and Sokka. The bloodbending technique was eventually deemed illegal by the time of the Korra series, though a Water Tribe criminal named Yakone managed to learn of its existence and used it to criminal ends, later training his two sons, Tarrlok and Noatak (aka Amon), in the technique as well.

Appearing in The Legend of Korra

- Tonraq (voiced by Carlos Alazraqui in season 1, James Remar in seasons 2–4) is a powerful waterbender and the current Chief of the Southern Water Tribe, as well as the father of Avatar Korra. Born as the heir to the Chief of both Water Tribes, he is the older brother of Unalaq. Growing up in the Northern Water Tribe, Tonraq served as the Northern military's general in his youth. In the season 2 episode "The Southern Lights", it is revealed that Tonraq was banished and disinherited following the destruction of a sacred spiritual forest at his hands. He moved to the Southern Water Tribe, where he became the tribe's unofficial leader and married Senna, with whom he has one daughter, Korra. For many years, Tonraq lived in peace with his family, but when the tensions between the Northern and Southern Tribe escalated into a civil war, he discovered Unalaq had orchestrated his banishment. After this revelation, he led the Southern Water Tribe rebels against his younger brother and the Northern army. After Unalaq's death in the season 2 finale "Light in The Dark", the South gained independence from the North and the Council of Elders officially appointed Tonraq as the first Southern Chief.

Tonraq was designed by Bryan Konietzko and Joaquim Dos Santos. The design was based on the idea that Tonraq is "built like a barbarian and fights with a brutish in-your-face style" in contrast with his brother Unalaq's "slender frame and elegant technique."

Zach Blumenfeld of Paste magazine compared Unalaq to the High Sparrow from Game of Thrones, both being "a brilliant schemer who hides a power-hungry soul under a spiritual veneer." Unalaq was designed by Ki-Hyun Ryu and Joshua Middleton. Co-creator Bryan Konietzko said that initially he was not pleased with Unalaq's design due to its visual similarities with Tarrlok's, the secondary villain from season 1.

- Kya (voiced by Lisa Edelstein) is the second of Avatar Aang and Katara's three children and their only daughter, as well as the couple's only waterbending child. She is named after Sokka and Katara's mother. A waterbending master and healer, Kya has always felt a stronger connection with her mother than her Avatar father. Kya has a "free-spirited" personality. Kya and her older brother Bumi felt neglected by Avatar Aang, who focused his attention on their younger brother Tenzin, the only other airbender in the family. This childhood resentment surfaced in season 2. Kya is revealed to be lesbian in the sequel graphic novel The Legend of Korra: Turf Wars.

Set to be published by Dark Horse Comics on July 28, 2026, The Legend of Korra: Kya and the secret of the Sand focuses on Kya's journey of self-discovery at the edges of the Earth Kingdom.

Kya's design was a collaboration between supervising producers Lauren Montgomery and Ki-Hyun Ryu, and co-creator Bryan Konietzko. Kya's outfits were designed as a callback to Katara's outfits from the original series.

- Princess Eska and Prince Desna (voiced by Aubrey Plaza and Aaron Himelstein, respectively) are the androgynous waterbending twin children of Chief Unalaq of the Northern Water Tribe, and Avatar Korra's cousins. Eska and Desna are 16 years old when they are introduced in season 2; they share an unusually close connection and can seemingly communicate with each other without speaking. Desna and Eska "rarely show any emotion besides boredom, due to the fact that they dislike most people, places, and things." Sharing identical personalities, looks and waterbending abilities, the twins provide sardonic comic relief. Although they initially help their villainous father Unalaq, the twins later become Korra's allies. After their father's death, they succeeded him as the Northern Water Tribe Chiefs.

Eska and Desna were designed by Joshua Middleton and Ki-Hyun Ryu. Middleton initially struggled to design Eska and Desna's look, and it was not until Ryu "took a pass and gave them their distinctive hunch and dead-eyed expression that the characters finally came to life."

=== Air Nomads ===
Before the genocide, airbenders were a diverse and migratory people united by the Four Air Temples. The Four Air Temples were self-governed by a unitary pseudo-ecclesiastical adhocratic senate, known as the Councils of Elders. Composed of wise airbending masters, they had limited authority in their respective temples; they served as counsel for its citizens and airbending instructors. Except for Air Temple Island, sex segregation was par norm; the Northern and Southern Air Temple branches were exclusively male, while the Eastern and Western Air Temple branches were exclusively female. No non-benders existed amongst the Air Nomads: everyone can bend. Unlike the other nations, where bending is a rare gift, the Air Nomads were deeply spiritual and their entire culture was built around connecting with the world and the energy within themselves. That connection unlocked air bending for every single one of them. Air Nomads didn't pass on bending through bloodlines; it was awakened through intense spiritual practice and a peaceful lifestyle. It's why they lived in temples, meditated daily, and trained from childhood. For Air Nomads, bending wasn't power, it was balance.

After the genocide, to preserve the culture of the extinct Air Nomads, Avatar Aang founded the Air Acolytes; the group primarily consisted of Earth Kingdom non-benders preservationsists that would uphold Air Nomad philosophies and traditions. After the acolytes' formation, the air temples were each administered by abbots and abbesses. Following harmonic convergence-event of 171 AG, Tenzin, by virtue of being the world's most senior airbending master, continued to have a say in global affairs as the figurehead of the Air Nation. He continued to reside on Air Temple Island branch.

Appearing in Avatar: The Last Airbender

- Monk Gyatso (voiced by Sab Shimono as an old man in the animated series, Sean Marquette as a young man in the animated series, portrayed by Lim Kay Siu in the live-action Netflix adaptation) was a member of the Council of Elders at the Southern Air Temple that was killed by Firebenders 100 years prior to the show. In Book One, he is depicted as Aang's guardian and surrogate father, and is noted for his kindness and sense of humor. In Book Two, he is seen in Aang's dream sequence. In Book Three, he is also revealed to have a strong friendship with Roku, leading to the observation that some friendships are strong enough to transcend lifetimes. He was named after Tenzin Gyatso (the 14th Dalai Lama).
- The Sky Bison, sometimes Air Bison, are revealed to be the original Airbenders. Sky Bison can only start flying when they are more than a couple months old. Domesticated Sky Bison calves usually select an Air Nomad as their Master, and then become that person's best friend for life. Appa is a member of this species.

Appearing in The Legend of Korra

- Ikki (voiced by Darcy Rose Byrnes) is the second child and youngest daughter of Tenzin and Pema and the granddaughter of Katara and Avatar Aang. She is sweet and very energetic, but she matures as the seasons go on, and is a brave and skilled young airbender. Suffering from middle child syndrome, Geek.com described her as the "Jan Brady" of the Korra universe as she is constantly overlooked in favor of her older sister Jinora and younger brother Meelo, much to her annoyance. Along with her brother Meelo, Ikki is primarily used for comic relief. However, she also has a more important role than Meelo, helping her father reconcile with his siblings, reconciling with her own in the process in the second season, and (unintentionally) helped expose Zaheer and assisted the other airbenders in saving Korra in the third season. Ikki's biggest role is in the fourth season, when she and her siblings brought Korra back to Republic City. Later, she helped Team Avatar and the rest of the airbenders defeat Kuvira. Lauren Davis of io9 noted that Ikki's strengths are that she is friendly, empathic and not easily rattled.
- Meelo (voiced by Logan Wells) is the third child and eldest son of Tenzin and Pema and the grandson of Katara and Avatar Aang. Meelo is primarily used for comic relief aimed at younger viewers, such as his "fartbending". Lauren Davis of io9 noted that "growing up hearing about Aang's adventures have left [Meelo] with a romantic (and not terribly pragmatic) sense of life on the road."

According to series creators Bryan Konietzko and Michael Dante DiMartino, the inspiration for Meelo and many of his antics came from their mutual friend's son, Milo. Konietzko and DiMartino decided that the character "would be a fun, chaotic personality to throw in the mix and test Tenzin's patience and fathering skills." While they originally envisioned Meelo to be a "cute kid", supervising producer Ki-Hyun Ryu, who worked on Meelo's design, insisted that Meelo should be "ugly" instead.

- Rohan (voiced by Stephanie Sheh) is the fourth child of Pema and Tenzin. Younger brother of Jinora, Ikki and Meelo. He makes his first appearance in the episode "Turning the Tides" (10th episode of Book 1: Air of The Legend of Korra.
- Bumi (voiced by Dee Bradley Baker in season 1, Richard Riehle in seasons 2–4) is Avatar Aang and Katara's first child and eldest son. Originally a nonbender, he later developed airbending abilities in season 3 after Harmonic Convergence. Before his retirement, he was a respected commander of the United Force. Despite his immaturity, Bumi is known for his leadership, strategy, and bravery. He was named after Aang's childhood friend King Bumi.
- Kai (voiced by Skyler Brigmann) is an orphan from the Earth Kingdom who became an airbender after Harmonic Convergence. Introduced in the season 3 episode "Rebirth", Kai was initially a mischievous and selfish young thief; he ultimately grows into a valuable member of the Air Nomads. It is established in the season 4 episode "After All These Years" that he is in a relationship with Jinora.

Writer Joshua Hamilton, who wrote the first episode Kai appears in, named the character after his son. Kai's personality was inspired partly by Avatar Aang and Avatar Wan, with the writers wanting to have "an adventurous kid with a slightly shadowy background." Kai's design was done by character designer Angela Song Mueller and supervising producer Ki-Hyun Ryu.

- Opal (voiced by Alyson Stoner) is an airbending member of the new Air Nation and the daughter of Suyin Beifong and Baatar, half-niece of Lin Beifong, and granddaughter of Toph Beifong. At some point after the insurrection of the Red Lotus, she began a romantic relationship with Bolin.

=== Metal Clan ===
Zaofu is an autonomous city state. A progressive metalbending city, it is the home of the Metal Clan and was founded and governed by the Beifong family. Considered the safest and most prosperous city in the world, the settlement is constructed entirely out of metal alloys and protective platinum domes.

- Suyin Beifong (voiced by Anne Heche as an adult, Michaela Jill Murphy in her young age) is the matriarch of Zaofu, youngest daughter of Toph Beifong and half-sister to Lin. Suyin is married to an architect named Baatar, with whom she has five children: Baatar Jr., Opal, Huan, Wei, and Wing. Geek.com described Suyin Beifong as "one of the more morally flexible ally characters", noting that while Suyin is dedicated to helping others and is fiercely loyal to her family, she still holds onto some personality traits from her criminal past.

Suyin and her sister, Lin, clashed a lot in the past due to their different personalities. Matt Patches of ScreenCrush described Suyin as the "liberal arts-educated, poetry-quoting, world-traveling, New Yorker-reading, self-identified foodie" to Lin's "blue collar, bread-and-butter townie." Max Nicholson of IGN wrote that despite "how different Lin and Su were from each other," they were "also the same -- almost like two sides of Toph's coin." Suyin was designed by Konietzko and character designer Christie Tseng.

- Baatar (voiced by Jim Meskimen) is an architect and the husband of Suyin Beifong, with whom he has five children. He helped create the metal city of Zaofu.
- Baatar Jr. (voiced by Todd Haberkorn) is Suyin Beifong and Baatar's eldest son, the former fiancé of Kuvira, and Zaofu's chief engineer responsible for enacting his father's architectural designs. After Earth Queen Hou-Ting's murder and subsequent stabilization of the Earth Kingdom, he left Zaofu together with Kuvira to reunite the nation.

Baatar Jr.'s design was done by Konietzko and Angela Song Mueller. On designing Baatar Jr., Konietzko noted that the character "got a pretty major update from the dorky, awkward young engineer he was in Book Three to this harsh, creepy second in command of Kuvira's forces in Book Four."

- Huan (voiced by Jason Marsden) is the second oldest son of Suyin and Baatar. As a sculptor, he uses his metalbending abilities to create a variety of abstract statues and sculptures that he exhibits in the gardens of Zaofu.
- Wei and Wing (voiced by Marcus Toji) are the twin sons of Suyin and Baatar. The youngest of their siblings, they invented a game for metalbenders called power disc. They are described as the "jocks" of the Beifong family.
- Aiwei (voiced by Maurice LaMarche) was an earthbender and the trusted adviser of Zaofu's matriarch, Suyin Beifong. Aiwei was a truth-seer, capable of using his earthbending as a vibration-sensitive lie detector. In the season 3 episode "The Terror Within", he was discovered to be a mole for the Red Lotus after they failed to kidnap Avatar Korra. After his escape from Zaofu, Aiwei met the Red Lotus leader Zaheer in the Spirit World in the following episode "The Stakeout", where he was thrown into the Fog of Lost Souls by the airbender.

=== The White Lotus ===
The White Lotus is a Raava-aligned international bureaucratic secret-society organization of teachers, philosophers, and warriors, who value knowledge and wisdom above nationality. Their name comes from the White Lotus tile, a low-ranking piece in the game of Pai Sho (牌數; Pái Shù), which is the most common form of communication among members. Iroh is among the highest-ranking members, and hints of the Order are dropped throughout the series through his actions. Iroh, a Grand Lotus, eventually calls the entirety of the Order to reveal themselves and liberate Ba Sing Se during the events of "Sozin's Comet".

In The Legend of Korra, the White Lotus has expanded to act as an elite international police force among the Four Nations, while also taking responsibility for finding, guiding and defending the next Avatar, a task previously the responsibility of internal sages within each Nation. However, it would cause a division among its ranks with those disillusioned forming the Vaatu-aligned anarchistic Red Lotus.

In Seven Havens, the White Lotus reappear as central characters, continuing their mission of safeguarding, training, and maintaining secrecy of the Avatar twins, Pavi and Nisha, existence from a world that fears and hates them.

- King Bumi (布米; Bù Mǐ) (voiced by André Sogliuzzo as an old man in the animated series, Kevin Ng as a young boy in the animated series, Sunil Malhotra in Avatar: The Last Airbender: Quest for Balance, portrayed by Utkarsh Ambudkar as an old man in the live-action series, Pradnesh Prakash as a young boy in the live-action series) is the whimsical, elderly King of Omashu, an Earth Kingdom stronghold. As a child, Bumi was a close friend of Aang's. Despite his age and apparent frailty and eccentric personality, Bumi is an Earthbending master, himself claiming to be "the most powerful Earthbender you'll ever see". Putting Aang through a series of tests in Book One, Bumi surrendered to the Fire Nation in Book Two to avert any harm to his people while telling Aang to find another who can teach him Earthbending, stating he should find someone who waits, then listens (describing a then-unfamiliar Toph's fighting style). In Book Three, Bumi breaks free during the Day of Black Sun and single-handedly retakes Omashu before answering Iroh's call to liberate Ba Sing Se. The word Bumi comes from the Sanskrit 'bhūmi' meaning 'earth'. In the sequel series, Aang and Katara named their firstborn son after King Bumi.
- Master Pakku (voiced by Victor Brandt in the animated series, portrayed by A Martinez in the live-action series) is a Waterbending master and instructor of the North Pole's Northern Water Tribe Waterbending classes. He is dryly sarcastic and very serious about his teachings. He insists on only teaching male students but relents after identifying Katara as the granddaughter of his runaway fiancée Kanna. At the climax of Book Three, Pakku joins the rest of the order in liberating Ba Sing Se and reveals that he has married Kanna.
- Master Jeong Jeong (琤琤) (voiced by Keone Young in the animated series, portrayed by Terry Chen in the live-action series) is a former admiral of the Fire Nation's navy who lives in exile with his followers. Though he had once been Zhao's teacher, Zhao quit because he believed Jeong Jeong's teaching methods were ineffective. Even though he warned against it, Jeong Jeong taught Aang the basics of Firebending by using a flame and a leaf, although Aang eventually relented and realized he needed to follow the proper elemental cycle after he accidentally burned Katara. As with most of the elder masters encountered by Team Avatar, Jeong Jeong revealed himself as a member of the White Lotus at the gates of Ba Sing Se.
- Master Piandao (voiced by Robert Patrick in the animated series, portrayed by Jon Jon Briones in the live-action series) is a swordsmith and master of swordsmanship, based in the Fire Nation, who teaches a foundation of his skills to Sokka. His devotion to swordsmanship supersedes his affiliation with the Fire Nation. Even though he knew from the beginning that Sokka was from the Water tribe, he did not mind, as he believes the way of the sword is independent of any one nation. Piandao is later revealed to have tutored Zuko in swordplay. He later joins the Order of the White Lotus in liberating Ba Sing Se.

=== The Red Lotus ===
The Red Lotus are an Vaatu-aligned anarchist splinter faction of the Raava-aligned Order of the White Lotus that appears during the events of "The Legend of Korra" as the main antagonists of season 3. Disillusioned with the White Lotus doctrine and founded during Korra's childhood, former White Lotus member Xai Bau founded the Red Lotus on the ideal that chaos is the natural order of things and that all the world's existing power structures must dismantle. To achieve this "true freedom", the Red Lotus planned to eliminate world leaders and end the Avatar cycle. It is revealed in the season 3 episode "The Stakeout", that the Red Lotus attempted to kidnap Korra when she was a child and use her to release Vaatu: a scheme their former member Unalaq carried out to his own design. After being released when Zaheer manifested airbending abilities, the Red Lotus seek to capture Korra and kill her in the Avatar state to end the Avatar cycle. Though they failed, the Red Lotus's actions caused a power vacuum in the Earth Kingdom with the murder of the Earth Queen in the episode "Long Live the Queen".

Creating and writing for the Red Lotus was "a blast" said co-creator Bryan Konietzko, "[Michael Dante DiMartino], Tim Hedrick, Joshua Hamilton, and I got to dream up a team of baddies who represented each of the four elements, but with rare and deadly skills."

- Unalaq (voiced by Adrian LaTourelle) was a Red Lotus waterbending master, Chief of the Northern and Southern Water Tribes, Tonraq's younger brother, and Korra's uncle. He has two twin children, Desna and Eska. A traditionalist, Unalaq was a solemn man who took on the task of restoring the lost connection between the Southern Water Tribe and the Spirit World. A particularly spiritual man, Unalaq briefly served as Korra's spiritual mentor until her discovery of his involvement in her father's banishment, at which point he was absolved as her teacher and shunned. Unbeknownst to anyone, Unalaq was working to release Vaatu from incarceration in the Spirit World, and succeeded in this task before fusing with Vaatu to become the first and only Dark Avatar. To this end, Unalaq nearly destroyed Republic City before being defeated and killed by his niece. Even though his attempt to destroy the Avatar and usher the world into an era of darkness was consequently thwarted, Unalaq succeeded in reuniting humans and spirits and thus changing the world forever. In the season 3 episode "The Stakeout", it is revealed that Unalaq used to be a member of the Red Lotus anarchist group, helping them in their attempted kidnapping of Korra when she was a child.
- Zaheer (voiced by Henry Rollins) is the leader of the Red Lotus and an anarchist, who strongly believes in the foundation of a new world without the Order of the White Lotus, the four nations, or the Avatar. After season 2's Harmonic Convergence, he also became an airbender. In the season 3 episode "Enter the Void", after having let go of his final earthly tether upon P'Li's death, Zaheer unlocked the ability of flight. Prior to becoming an airbender, Zaheer was already a martial arts master who practiced a freeform, parkour style. Becoming an airbender only accentuated his already formidable skills.

In pursuit of his goals, Zaheer and three of his comrades were captured and imprisoned. After becoming an airbender thirteen years later, he escaped the custody of the Order of the White Lotus and subsequently freed his allies from prison. He threw the Earth Kingdom into chaos by assassinating the Earth Queen and attempted to end the Avatar cycle by killing Avatar Korra while she was in the Avatar State, though failed, leaving him as the only survivor of their group of four. Following his defeat, Zaheer was once again imprisoned. Zaheer returned in the season 4 episode "Beyond the Wilds" when Korra confronts Zaheer in his prison cell. Realizing his actions unintentionally created a tyrant, Zaheer helps Korra reconnect with Raava in the face of their common enemy Kuvira.

Zaheer was well-received as a morally ambiguous and sympathetic villain. Zaheer is the first, and only, villainous airbender seen in Avatar franchise. With Zaheer, it is the first time viewers see airbending used in brutal and agonizing ways. Geek.com noted that, "After two show's worth of seeing airbenders as oppressed, lighthearted, good people, it was jarring witnessing the logical dark conclusions of a valid interpretation of airbender philosophy. Air is the element of freedom, so total anarchy is the only real political stance. Zaheer's more violent airbending techniques, from flight to literally sucking the life out of someone, were also a visual treat."
Zaheer was designed by Konietzko. On the conception of Zaheer, Konietzko explained that, "All the way back to Avatar days, writers would pitch 'evil' Airbender premises. Whether these were interesting or not, Mike and I always shot them down, saying, 'Aang is the last Airbender.' But when Harmonic Convergence created new Airbenders, we finally had the opportunity to explore such a character, and we loved doing so!"

- Ming-Hua (voiced by Grey DeLisle) was the waterbender ally of Zaheer and a member of the Red Lotus. A powerful waterbender who was born without arms, Ming-Hua was able to waterbend liquid arms that were extremely effective, allowing her to use them as hands to grab things, as tendrils to climb or as deadly ice spears. She was freed from prison by both Zaheer and Ghazan. Ming-Hua played an integral part in deposing the Earth Queen and attempting to kill Korra. Ming-Hua died of electrocution by Mako.

The idea for Ming-Hua's character came from a joke pitch Konietzko and DiMartino had about Amon surviving the boat explosion at the end of season 1, but needing to bend water in the place of his missing limbs. The character was designed by Konietzko, who based Ming-Hua's face and petite build on a friend of his.

- Ghazan (voiced by Peter Giles) was the earthbender ally of Zaheer. Ghazan was a member of the Red Lotus with a special subset of bending, lavabending. Ghazan was freed from prison by Zaheer after Zaheer had acquired airbending. Ghazan played an integral part in deposing the Earth Queen and attempting to kill Korra. Ghazan eventually committed suicide when under threat of re-capture.

Ghazan was designed by Konietzko, who noted that "Ghazan's basic look came together pretty smoothly" for him, however, "pinning down the specifics of his tattoos in the final model sheet took much more time."

- P'Li (voiced by Kristy Wu) was the firebender ally and girlfriend of Zaheer. P'Li had the powerful firebending subset of combustionbending. As a girl, P'Li was saved by Zaheer from becoming a warlord's killing machine. Upon being freed from prison, P'Li joined the rest of the Red Lotus in trying to take down the world leaders and the Avatar. In the season 3 episode "Enter the Void", Suyin Beifong traps P'Li's head in a sheet of metal, causing her to blow up her own head when trying to attack.

To design P'Li, Konietzko researched extremely tall female athletes for inspiration as he wanted to break the stereotype of females being the smallest and shortest in a group. P'Li's third-eye tattoo design was derived from ancient depictions of the third eye of the Hindu god, Shiva.

=== Freedom Fighters ===
First encountered in "Jet", this rag-tag group led by the episode's namesake operates in the forests of the Earth Kingdom. The group consists of its leader Jet and his subordinates Pipsqueak, Smellerbee, Longshot, the Duke, and Sneers.

- Jet (voiced by Crawford Wilson in the animated series, portrayed by Sebastian Amoruso in the live-action series) is a charismatic teenage rebel who holds a deep grudge against the Fire Nation. He is the leader of the Freedom Fighters, a group of children antagonizing Fire Nation soldiers even at the expense of innocent lives. He is Katara's first crush. In Book Two, he encounters Zuko who goes by his alternate name, Li. The two bond and Jet attempts to persuade Li to join the Freedom Fighters but Li denies the offer. In later episodes, Jet openly condemns his previous actions (which include "misnaming" Li as a Firebender) in Ba Sing Se, where he is brainwashed by chancellor Long Feng. He is released from this condition by the protagonists and is later killed protecting Aang during a fight against Long Feng.
- Pipsqueak (voiced by Sterling Young in the animated series, portrayed by Vincent Huang in the live-action series) is the largest and strongest of the Freedom Fighters (despite his name), using a giant log as a weapon during the time of Book One. In Book Three, he joins the invasion against the Fire Nation and is taken captive when it falls. He is seen again at the end of the finale.
- Smellerbee (voiced by Nika Futterman in the animated series, portrayed by Wes Valarao in the live-action series) is a Freedom Fighter. In Book One, she is first seen when she helps Jet destroy a dam. In Book Two, she accompanies Jet and Longshot to Ba Sing Se, but leaves Jet after watching him obsess with trying to prove that Iroh and Zuko are Firebenders. She becomes the new leader of the Freedom Fighters after Jet's death. Due to her Tomboy appearance and behavior, she is constantly mistaken for a boy as a running gag.
- Longshot (voiced by Marc Donato in the animated series, portrayed by Nathaniel Kong in the live-action series) is a silent member of the Freedom Fighters by the time of Book One. In Book Two, he accompanies Jet and Smellerbee to Ba Sing Se. He only says one line after Jet was fatally injured.
- The Duke (voiced by Mitch Holleman in Book One of the animated series, Nick Swoboda in Book Three of the animated series, portrayed by Taylor Lam Wright in the live-action series) is the youngest and smallest member of the Freedom Fighters during Book One. He is first mistaken for Pipsqueak because he rode on Pipsqueak's shoulders when they met Sokka, Katara, and Aang. He is later seen in Book Three with Pipsqueak in the Day of Black Sun invasion force, goes with Aang to the Western Air Temple after the invasion's failure, and is separated from them after Azula's attack. He is also seen hugging Toph at the end of the finale.
- Sneers is a Freedom Fighter introduced in the episode titled "Jet." He is not very important to the plot.

=== The Equalists ===
The Equalists are an anti-bender revolutionary group based in Republic City that evolved into a full-blown terrorist organization under the leadership from Amon, and weapons supplied by Hiroshi Sato. Their ultimate goal was to create equality for all by eradicating bending altogether. According to The Equalists, nonbenders are systemically oppressed by benders in Republic City, where bending grants greater social power and nonbenders must work substantially harder in order to succeed. The Equalists used electrified chi-blocker gloves so as to even the playing field between them and benders. Although they were defeated at the end of season 1, The Equalists movement resulted in the dissolution of the non-elected City Council, with nonbender Raiko becoming the first democratically elected president of the United Republic of Nations after being elected by the nonbending majority.

Bryan Konietzko and Joaquim Dos Santos did the character designs for The Equalists, including their leader, Amon. According to Dos Santos, the design for the Equalist chi-blockers did not come easy and was only approved after 20 to 30 different takes.

- Amon (阿蒙; ā Méng) (voiced by Steve Blum), born Noatak, was the charismatic and mysterious leader of The Equalists, and the main villain of the first season. Nickelodeon's press release described Amon as "a nimble, stealthy fighter who shows no fear even against the highest-level bender." Amon wore a mask to conceal his face, which he claimed had been disfigured by a firebender. Claiming to be a nonbender to whom the spirits granted the ability to remove a person's bending permanently, a power previously demonstrated only by the Avatar, Amon gained the confidence and support of many people with his ideas. DiMartino said of the idea for Amon's character:

Korra is so in love with her powers and thinks bending is the greatest thing in the world, so we thought the best antagonist to challenge a character like that would be Amon and his anti-bending revolution. Since Korra isn't a reluctant hero, like Aang was, the challenge was coming up with a problem that she couldn't solve just by beating someone up, although she tries! Amon is able to sway people to his side with just his ideas. And the idea of a world where benders are targeted by the enemy is a shock to this young Avatar, who comes of age in a world where bending skills are traditionally celebrated.

By the end of season 1, when the complete conquest of Republic City by The Equalists became imminent, Amon's true identity was exposed to the public by Korra. In actuality, he was a prodigious Northern Water Tribe bloodbender, an illegal and highly feared style of bending, and the son of bloodbending crime boss, Yakone, whose own bending had been removed by Avatar Aang. Amon and his brother, former councilman Tarrlok, were forced by their cruel and perfectionist father to become master bloodbenders and shaped to become a tool in Yakone's master plan for revenge against the Avatar. Tarrlok described Amon as being obsessed with fairness throughout his life, helping those deemed inferior as a child, but growing colder as he got older. Although he succeeded in removing Korra's bending (which was later restored by Aang), Amon had to leave Republic City with his brother after his past was revealed. As they fled, a remorseful Tarrlok used an Equalist glove to ignite the fuel tank of Amon's boat, killing them both. Max Nicholson of IGN summed up Amon and Tarrlok's underlying story arc as being "about two estranged brothers striving to carry out their father's quest for vengeance, only to realize that it was a fool's errand all along," calling it "really a touching concealed narrative".

- Hiroshi Sato (voiced by Daniel Dae Kim) was a nonbending wealthy industrialist, the founder of Future Industries and the father of Asami Sato. Nickelodeon's press release described him as "a barrel-chested businessman with a big personality". A brilliant inventor who reviewers have compared to Henry Ford, Hiroshi invented the revolutionary Satomobile, the automobiles of this fictional world. Hiroshi, whose family lineage extends back to the first Fire Nation colonists, was born to a poor family and worked from a very young age to help support his family, before eventually convincing a wealthy banker to invest in his Satomobile idea. Hiroshi is also credited with inventing the platinum mecha tank, which Varrick modernized into the mecha suit for Kuvira's military in season 4, and the biplane, the airplanes of this fictional world.

In the season 1 episode "The Aftermath", he was revealed to be an Equalist, creating and supplying the anti-bending group high-tech weaponry to fight against benders. Hiroshi hated benders because a firebender had killed his wife, Yasuko. He was imprisoned for his crimes after the anti-bending revolution was quelled in season 1. By season 4, Hiroshi was shown to be remorseful over his actions and tried to reconcile with his daughter, Asami. When Kuvira threatened Republic City, Hiroshi was temporarily released from prison by Lin Beifong in the two-part series finale to help arm the prototype hummingbird mechas with plasma saws. He made his final amends with his daughter before ultimately sacrificing his life to give Team Avatar the opportunity to take down the giant mecha suit and its spirit energy cannon by cutting through its platinum armor and giving them an entry.

Hiroshi's character design was inspired by and modeled after US President Theodore Roosevelt and Japanese industrialist Keita Gotō. His mustache is based on Mitsubishi founder Iwasaki Yatarō's.

- The Lieutenant (voiced by Lance Henriksen) is a nonbender and Amon's second-in-command. Nickelodeon's press release described The Lieutenant as "an intense, disciplined fighter who augments his amazing skills with two electrified kali sticks." He wears a pack on his back that serves as a battery to charge up his kali sticks. He turns on Amon in the season 1 finale "Endgame", upon finding out about Amon's true identity as a bloodbender. The Lieutenant's final design was done by Dos Santos, and was inspired by steampunk culture.

== Reception ==
The characters of Avatar: The Last Airbender received praise from reviewers. Troy Island Mell, of IGN, felt that the story "would [not] be anywhere near as good as it is without its ability to create such strong characters". In particular, Mell enjoyed the development of Katara and Zuko throughout the first season, but thought that Zuko's relationship with his uncle was not "very organic." Jamie S. Rich of DVDTalk generally agreed with Mell's assessment of the characters. Rich also praised the fact that, unlike many cartoon television series, Avatar introduces antagonists that have a deep backstory and "are [not] just evil for the sake of it".

Jeremy Mullin, another IGN reviewer, felt that the characters were not brilliantly done, though he noted that they introduced some drama and romantic tension usually not found on Nickelodeon, especially between Aang and Katara. Lair of the Green Knight and DVD Verdict also enjoyed the romantic tension, focusing mainly on the female cast: Katara, Toph, and Azula, as well as the two minor characters, Mai and Ty Lee. Fitz at Lair of the Green Knight lauded the decision to not stereotypically fashion the women into the "usual weak female characters" but to instead give them "strong opinions and strength". IGN also compared character relationships, complimenting "Sokka and Princess Yue's forbidden love" while criticizing Iroh and Zuko's relationship as not being executed properly. DVDVerdict felt that some minor characters, especially Mai and Ty Lee, were "love em' or hate em'" characters. Gabriel Powers of DVDActive thought that while the characters fit into neat "archetypes", it was not a bad thing and fit well with the series.

In 2008, Avatar: The Last Airbender was awarded a Peabody for its "unusually complex characters". This makes the cartoon one of few animations to win the award and the only one to be cited for its character development.

== Film casting ==
Katara and Sokka as depicted in the third season of the animated series (left) and live-action film (right). The casting of white actors to portray dark-skinned characters sparked controversy and accusations of racism against the studio and casting agencies.

M. Night Shyamalan originally offered the roles of Aang to Noah Ringer; Sokka to Jackson Rathbone; Katara to Nicola Peltz; and Zuko to Jesse McCartney. In selecting Nicola Peltz, Shyamalan commented that he did not want to make The Last Airbender without her, saying that "I said that only once before in my career, and that was when I met Haley in The Sixth Sense auditions." In February 2009, Dev Patel replaced McCartney, whose tour dates conflicted with a boot camp scheduled for the cast to train in martial arts.

The casting of all-white actors for main protagonist roles in the live-action, Asian-influenced film triggered a negative reaction which was marked by accusations of racism, a letter-writing campaign, and a protest outside of a Philadelphia casting call for movie extras. Jackson Rathbone dismissed the complaints in an interview with MTV, saying, "I think it's one of those things where I pull my hair up, shave the sides, and I definitely need a tan. It's one of those things where, hopefully, the audience will suspend disbelief a little bit." Shaun Toub, who plays Iroh, also defended the casting choices. He noted that "if they would have put all Asians in a certain nation, I think then there would be people who come out and said, 'Well, now you're stereotyping, saying that anything that has to do with martial arts has to do with Asians and chop suey and all that.' So it's nice to mix it up and just do the unexpected."

Movie critic Roger Ebert was one of the critical voices against the casting decision. When asked about selection of primarily white actors to portray the characters, he said, "The original series Avatar: The Last Airbender was highly regarded and popular for three seasons on Nickelodeon. Its fans take it for granted that its heroes are Asian. Why would Paramount and Shyamalan go out of their way to offend these fans? There are many young Asian actors capable of playing the parts." Jevon Phillips of the Los Angeles Times noted that despite Shyamalan's attempts to defuse the situation, the issue will "not fade away or be overlooked", and that this film exemplifies the need for a debate within Hollywood about racial diversity in its films. Popular Korean cartoonist Derek Kirk Kim reacted to the film's casting by comparing it to a hypothetical film which depicts white actors wearing traditional African clothing and eating traditional African food in traditional African huts. Shyamalan, however, countered that "this movie, and then the three movies, will be the most culturally diverse tentpole movies ever released."
