= The Legend of Korra (comics) =

Comic series

- Created by: Michael Dante DiMartino; Bryan Konietzko

Publication information
- Publisher: Dark Horse Comics
Title(s)
Turf Wars (3 parts, 2017–18)
Ruins of the Empire (3 parts, 2019–20)
- Formats: Series of original graphic novels
- Original language: English
- Genre: Fantasy
- Publication date: July 26, 2017 – present
- Main character(s): Avatar Korra; Asami Sato

Creative team
- Writer(s): Michael Dante DiMartino; Bryan Konietzko
- Artist(s): Irene Koh; Michelle Wong
- Letterer(s): Nate Piekos; Rachel Deering; Ariana Maher
- Colorist(s): Killian Ng; Jane Bak; Adele Matera
- Editor(s): Dave Marshall; Rachel Roberts

The Legend of Korra comics are the continuation of the Nickelodeon animated television series The Legend of Korra, created by Michael Dante DiMartino and Bryan Konietzko. It is set after the series finale, and follows Avatar Korra and Asami Sato on their relationship. The comics are published by Dark Horse Comics, alongside Avatar: The Last Airbender.

== Short stories ==
The short comics appeared in the Free Comic Book Day issues.

Title	Date	Story	Art	Colors	FCBD issue
"Friends for Life"	May 7, 2016	Michael Dante DiMartino	Heather Campbell	Killian Ng	The Legend of Korra / How to Train Your Dragon / Plants vs. Zombies
"Lost Pets"	May 5, 2018	Michael Dante DiMartino	Jayd Aït-Kaci	Killian Ng	The Legend of Korra & Nintendo ARMS
"Clearing the Air"	August 25, 2021	Kiku Hughes	Sam Beck	Killian Ng	Avatar: The Last Airbender / The Legend of Korra
"Beach Wars"	May 7, 2022	Meredith McClaren			Avatar: The Last Airbender / The Legend of Korra

=== Patterns in Time ===
The Legend of Korra: Patterns in Time is a graphic novel anthology published November 30, 2022 with cover art by Sachin Teng. It collects the FCBD short stories "Friends for Life," "Lost Pets," and "Clearing the Air." It also includes five new stories written for the collection, which are listed below.

Title	Story	Art	Colors
"Skyscrapers"	Rachel Silverstein	Sam Beck	
"Wisdom"	Blue Delliquanti		
"A Change in the Wind"	Jen Xu and K. Rhodes		
"Weaver's Ball"	Victoria Ying		Lynette Wong
"Cat-Owl's Cradle"	Delilah Dawson	Alexandria Monik	

=== Avatar Legends: Masters of the Elements ===
Avatar Legends: Masters of the Elements was released on 25 August 2026. It collects the Avatar: The Last Airbender FCBD stories Lost and Found and Ramen Rumble, the Avatar: The Last Airbender CGD story Earth and Water, the The Legend of Korra FCBD story Beach Wars, and multiple new stories.

== Graphic novels ==
A continuation for The Legend of Korra, the story for the comic books were set after the television series.

Episode	Title	Date	Story	Script	Art	Colors	Cover	Notes
53	Turf Wars	July 26, 2017	Michael Dante DiMartino & Bryan Konietzko	Michael Dante DiMartino	Irene Koh	Killian Ng	Heather Campbell with Jane Bak	
53	Turf Wars	January 17, 2018	Michael Dante DiMartino & Bryan Konietzko	Michael Dante DiMartino	Irene Koh	Killian Ng	Heather Campbell with Killian Ng	
53	Turf Wars	August 22, 2018	Michael Dante DiMartino & Bryan Konietzko	Michael Dante DiMartino	Irene Koh	Killian Ng	Heather Campbell with Killian Ng	
54	Ruins of the Empire	May 21, 2019	Michael Dante DiMartino & Bryan Konietzko	Michael Dante DiMartino	Michelle Wong	Killian Ng	Michelle Wong with Killian Ng	
54	Ruins of the Empire	November 12, 2019	Michael Dante DiMartino & Bryan Konietzko	Michael Dante DiMartino	Michelle Wong	Killian Ng	Michelle Wong with Killian Ng	
54	Ruins of the Empire	February 25, 2020	Michael Dante DiMartino & Bryan Konietzko	Michael Dante DiMartino	Michelle Wong	Killian Ng and Adele Matera	Michelle Wong with Killian Ng	
55	The Mystery of Penquan Island	March 4, 2025	Michael Dante DiMartino & Bryan Konietzko	Kiku Hughes	Alex Monik	Diane Sousa	Alex Monik	
56	Kya and the Secret of the Sand	July 28, 2026	Michael Dante DiMartino & Bryan Konietzko	Kiku Hughes	Alex Monik	Diane Sousa	Alex Monik	

== Library edition hardcover ==
Material of the original graphic novels were collected in an oversized library edition featuring notes from the creators and a sketchbook section.

Volume	Title	Date	Collects	ISBN	Notes
1	Turf Wars	March 26, 2019 (LE); November 15, 2022 (Omni)	Turf Wars 1–3	9781506702025 (LE); 9781506733883 (Omni)	
2	Ruins of the Empire	September 22, 2020 (LE); April 11, 2023 (Omni)	Ruins of the Empire 1–3	9781506708935 (LE); 9781506733876 (Omni)	
