= List of The Legend of Korra episodes =

The Legend of Korra is an American animated television series created by Michael Dante DiMartino and Bryan Konietzko. A sequel to Avatar: The Last Airbender, the series premiered on Nickelodeon on April 14, 2012. Like its predecessor, the series is set in a fictional world inspired by Asian and Inuit cultures, and inhabited by people who can manipulate the elements of water, earth, fire or air through an ability called "bending." One person, the "Avatar," has the ability to bend all four elements. Reincarnating in turn among the world's four nations, the Avatar is responsible for maintaining peace, harmony, and balance in the world. Korra, the series' protagonist, is the next incarnation of the Avatar after Aang of Avatar: The Last Airbender. 52 episodes in total were produced, spanning four seasons.

== Series overview ==
Book	Name	Episodes	Originally released		
Book	Name	Episodes	First released	Last released	Network
1	Air	12	April 14, 2012	June 23, 2012	Nickelodeon
2	Spirits	14	September 13, 2013	November 22, 2013	Nickelodeon
3	Change	13	June 27, 2014	August 22, 2014	Nickelodeon; Nick.com
4	Balance	13	October 3, 2014	December 19, 2014	Nick.com

== Episodes ==
=== Season 1: Air (2012) ===
No. overall	No. in season	Title	Directed by	Written by	Storyboarded by	Original release date	Prod. code	U.S. viewers (millions)
1	1	"Welcome to Republic City"	Joaquim Dos Santos & Ki Hyun Ryu	Michael Dante DiMartino & Bryan Konietzko	Kang Sung Dae, Kim Sung Hoon & Lee Dae Woo; Storyboard revisions by: Alan Wan, Hyun Joo Song & Adam Lucas	April 14, 2012	101	4.55
2	2	"A Leaf in the Wind"	Joaquim Dos Santos & Ki Hyun Ryu	Michael Dante DiMartino & Bryan Konietzko	Han Kwang Il, Kim Young Chan & LeSean Thomas; Storyboard revisions by: Alan Wan, Hyun Joo Song, Adam Lucas & Colin Heck	April 14, 2012	102	4.55
3	3	"The Revelation"	Joaquim Dos Santos & Ki Hyun Ryu	Michael Dante DiMartino & Bryan Konietzko	Park So Young, Jeung Hae Young, Bae Ki Yong, Choi In Seung & Seung Eun Kim; Storyboard revisions by: Alan Wan, Hyun Joo Song, Adam Lucas & Colin Heck	April 21, 2012	103	3.55
4	4	"The Voice in the Night"	Joaquim Dos Santos & Ki Hyun Ryu	Michael Dante DiMartino & Bryan Konietzko	Han Kwang Il, Bae Ki Yong, Choi In Seung, Myoung Ga Young, Kim Sang Jin, Michael Dante DiMartino, Joaquim Dos Santos, Bryan Konietzko & Ki Hyun Ryu	April 28, 2012	104	4.08
5	5	"The Spirit of Competition"	Joaquim Dos Santos & Ki Hyun Ryu	Michael Dante DiMartino & Bryan Konietzko	Lee Dae Woo, Kim Sung Hoon & Kang Sung Dae; Storyboard revisions by: Alan Wan, Hyun Joo Song, Adam Lucas & Colin Heck	May 5, 2012	105	3.78
6	6	"And the Winner Is..."	Joaquim Dos Santos & Ki Hyun Ryu	Michael Dante DiMartino & Bryan Konietzko	Han Kwang Il, Kim Young Chan & LeSean Thomas; Storyboard revisions by: Alan Wan, Hyun Joo Song, Adam Lucas & Colin Heck	May 12, 2012	106	3.88
7	7	"The Aftermath"	Joaquim Dos Santos & Ki Hyun Ryu	Michael Dante DiMartino & Bryan Konietzko	Choi In Seung, Park So Young & Bae Ki Yong; Storyboard revisions by: Alan Wan, Hyun Joo Song, Adam Lucas & Colin Heck	May 19, 2012	107	3.45
8	8	"When Extremes Meet"	Joaquim Dos Santos & Ki Hyun Ryu	Michael Dante DiMartino & Bryan Konietzko	Myoung Ga Young, Kim Eui Jeong, LeSean Thomas & Kang Sung Dae; Storyboard revisions by: Alan Wan, Hyun Joo Song, Adam Lucas & Colin Heck	June 2, 2012	108	2.98
9	9	"Out of the Past"	Joaquim Dos Santos & Ki Hyun Ryu	Michael Dante DiMartino & Bryan Konietzko	Kim Sung Hoon, Lee Dae Woo, Bae Ki Yong, Choi In Seung & Park So Young; Storyboard revisions by: Alan Wan, Hyun Joo Song & Adam Lucas	June 9, 2012	109	3.58
10	10	"Turning the Tides"	Joaquim Dos Santos & Ki Hyun Ryu	Michael Dante DiMartino & Bryan Konietzko	Han Kwang Il, Kim Young Chan, LeSean Thomas, Bae Ki Yong & Lee Dae Woo; Storyboard revisions by: Alan Wan, Hyun Joo Song & Adam Lucas	June 16, 2012	110	3.54
11	11	"Skeletons in the Closet"	Joaquim Dos Santos & Ki Hyun Ryu	Michael Dante DiMartino & Bryan Konietzko	Bae Ki Yong, Choi In Seung & Park So Young; Storyboard revisions by: Alan Wan, Hyun Joo Song & Adam Lucas	June 23, 2012	111	3.68
12	12	"Endgame"	Joaquim Dos Santos & Ki Hyun Ryu	Michael Dante DiMartino & Bryan Konietzko	Lee Dae Woo, Bae Ki Yong, Choi In Seung, Kim Sung Hoon & Park So Young; Storyboard revisions by: Alan Wan, Hyun Joo Song & Adam Lucas	June 23, 2012	112	3.68

=== Season 2: Spirits (2013) ===
No. overall	No. in season	Title	Directed by	Written by	Storyboarded by	Original release date	Prod. code	U.S. viewers (millions)
13	1	"Rebel Spirit"	Colin Heck	Tim Hedrick	Joaquim Dos Santos, Lauren Montgomery, Ki Hyun Ryu, Colin Heck, Owen Sullivan, Olga Ulanova & Hyun Joo Song	September 13, 2013	113	2.60
14	2	"The Southern Lights"	Ian Graham	Joshua Hamilton	Joaquim Dos Santos, Lauren Montgomery, Ki Hyun Ryu, Ian Graham, Jay Oliva, Melchior Zwyer & Elsa Garagarza	September 13, 2013	114	2.60
15	3	"Civil Wars"	Colin Heck	Michael Dante DiMartino	Masami Annō, Joaquim Dos Santos, Ki Hyun Ryu, Lauren Montgomery & Colin Heck	September 20, 2013	115	2.19
16	4	"Civil Wars"	Ian Graham	Michael Dante DiMartino	Lee Dae Woo, Kim Sung Hoon & Park So Young; Storyboard revisions by: Owen Sullivan & Melchior Zwyer	September 27, 2013	116	2.38
17	5	"Peacekeepers"	Colin Heck	Tim Hedrick	Masami Annō; Storyboard revisions by: Owen Sullivan & Melchior Zwyer	October 4, 2013	117	1.10
18	6	"The Sting"	Ian Graham	Joshua Hamilton	Hyun Joo Song, Elsa Garagarza, Jay Oliva, Bobby Rubio, Sean Song, Dean Kelly, Johane Matte, Natasha Wicke & Ethan Spaulding	October 11, 2013	118	1.95
19	7	"Beginnings"	Colin Heck	Michael Dante DiMartino	Park So Young, Kim Sung Hoon, Han Kwang Il, Lee Dae Woo, Bae Ki Yong & Myoung Ga Young; Storyboard revisions by: Owen Sullivan & Melchior Zwyer	October 18, 2013	119	1.73
20	8	"Beginnings"	Ian Graham	Tim Hedrick	Park So Young, Kim Sung Hoon, Han Kwang Il, Lee Dae Woo, Bae Ki Yong & Myoung Ga Young; Storyboard revisions by: Owen Sullivan & Melchior Zwyer	October 18, 2013	120	1.73
21	9	"The Guide"	Colin Heck	Joshua Hamilton	Toshiyasu Kogawa; Storyboard revisions by: Owen Sullivan & Melchior Zwyer	November 1, 2013	121	2.47
22	10	"A New Spiritual Age"	Ian Graham	Tim Hedrick	Han Kwang Il, Lee Dae Woo, Kim Sung Hoon & Park So Young; Storyboard revisions by: Owen Sullivan & Melchior Zwyer	November 8, 2013	122	2.22
23	11	"Night of a Thousand Stars"	Colin Heck	Joshua Hamilton	Han Kwang Il, Lee Dae Woo, Bae Ki Yong, Park So Young, Kim Young Chan & Han Cheong Il; Storyboard revisions by: Owen Sullivan & Melchior Zwyer	November 15, 2013	123	1.87
24	12	"Harmonic Convergence"	Ian Graham	Tim Hedrick	Toshiyasu Kogawa; Storyboard revisions by: Owen Sullivan & Melchior Zwyer	November 15, 2013	124	1.87
25	13	"Darkness Falls"	Colin Heck	Joshua Hamilton	Han Kwang Il, Lee Dae Woo, Bae Ki Yong, Park So Young, Han Cheong Il & Kim Jung Hoon; Storyboard revisions by: Owen Sullivan & Melchior Zwyer	November 22, 2013	125	2.09
26	14	"Light in the Dark"	Ian Graham	Michael Dante DiMartino	Juno Lee, Jay Oliva, Dean Kelly, Johane Matte, Ethan Spaulding & Hyun Joo Song	November 22, 2013	126	2.09

=== Season 3: Change (2014) ===
No. overall	No. in season	Title	Directed by	Written by	Storyboarded by	Original release date	Prod. code	U.S. viewers (millions)
27	1	"A Breath of Fresh Air"	Melchior Zwyer	Tim Hedrick	Melchior Zwyer, Hyun Joo Song & Sol Choi	June 27, 2014	201	1.50
28	2	"Rebirth"	Colin Heck	Joshua Hamilton	Olga Ulanova, Natasha Wicke & William Ruzicka	June 27, 2014	202	1.50
29	3	"The Earth Queen"	Ian Graham	Tim Hedrick	Young Ki Yoon, Chris Palmer & Steve Ahn	June 27, 2014	203	1.29
30	4	"In Harm's Way"	Melchior Zwyer	Joshua Hamilton	Sol Choi, Hyun Joo Song & Shaun O'Neil	July 11, 2014	204	1.19
31	5	"The Metal Clan"	Colin Heck	Michael Dante DiMartino	Eugene Lee, Natasha Wicke & William Ruzicka	July 11, 2014	205	1.18
32	6	"Old Wounds"	Ian Graham	Katie Mattila	Young Ki Yoon, Chris Palmer, Johane Matte & Matthew Humphreys	July 18, 2014	206	1.28
33	7	"Original Airbenders"	Melchior Zwyer	Tim Hedrick	Sol Choi, Hyun Joo Song & Shaun O'Neil	July 18, 2014	207	1.33
34	8	"The Terror Within"	Colin Heck	Joshua Hamilton	Eugene Lee, Natasha Wicke & William Ruzicka	July 25, 2014	208	1.08
35	9	"The Stakeout"	Ian Graham	Michael Dante DiMartino	Young Ki Yoon, Chris Palmer, Justin Ridge, Haiwei Hou & Matthew Humphreys	August 1, 2014	209	N/A
36	10	"Long Live the Queen"	Melchior Zwyer	Tim Hedrick	Sol Choi, Hyun Joo Song & Shaun O'Neil	August 8, 2014	210	N/A
37	11	"The Ultimatum"	Colin Heck	Joshua Hamilton	Eugene Lee, Natasha Wicke & William Ruzicka	August 15, 2014	211	N/A
38	12	"Enter the Void"	Ian Graham	Michael Dante DiMartino	Young Ki Yoon, Chris Palmer, Elsa Garagarza, Dean Kelly, Steve Ahn, Johane Matte & Shaunt Nigoghossian	August 22, 2014	212	N/A
39	13	"Venom of the Red Lotus"	Melchior Zwyer	Joshua Hamilton & Tim Hedrick	Sol Choi, Hyun Joo Song & Shaun O'Neil	August 22, 2014	213	N/A

=== Season 4: Balance (2014) ===
No. overall	No. in season	Title	Directed by	Written by	Storyboarded by	Original release date	Prod. code
40	1	"After All These Years"	Colin Heck	Joshua Hamilton	Eugene Lee, Hyun Joo Song & Natasha Wicke	October 3, 2014	214
41	2	"Korra Alone"	Ian Graham	Michael Dante DiMartino	Chris Palmer, William Ruzicka, Steve Ahn, Jen Bennett & Brendan Clogher	October 10, 2014	215
42	3	"The Coronation"	Melchior Zwyer	Tim Hedrick	Sol Choi, Elsa Garagarza, Shaun O'Neil & Owen Sullivan	October 17, 2014	216
43	4	"The Calling"	Colin Heck	Katie Mattila	Eugene Lee, Hyun Joo Song, Olga Ulanova & Natasha Wicke	October 24, 2014	217
44	5	"Enemy at the Gates"	Ian Graham	Joshua Hamilton	Chris Palmer, William Ruzicka, Steve Ahn, Dean Kelly, Matthew Humphreys, Carli Squitieri & Jason Zurek	October 31, 2014	218
45	6	"The Battle of Zaofu"	Melchior Zwyer	Tim Hedrick	Sol Choi, Elsa Garagarza, Shaun O'Neil & Owen Sullivan	November 7, 2014	219
46	7	"Reunion"	Colin Heck	Michael Dante DiMartino	Eugene Lee, Hyun Joo Song, Natasha Wicke & Olga Ulanova	November 14, 2014	220
47	8	"Remembrances"	Michael Dante DiMartino	Joshua Hamilton, Katie Mattila & Tim Hedrick	Joaquim Dos Santos, Ki Hyun Ryu, Lauren Montgomery & Michael Dante DiMartino	November 21, 2014	221
48	9	"Beyond the Wilds"	Ian Graham	Joshua Hamilton	Chris Palmer, William Ruzicka, Steve Ahn, Johane Matte & Carli Squitieri	November 28, 2014	222
49	10	"Operation Beifong"	Melchior Zwyer	Tim Hedrick	Sol Choi, Elsa Garagarza, Shaun O'Neil & Owen Sullivan	December 5, 2014	223
50	11	"Kuvira's Gambit"	Colin Heck	Joshua Hamilton	Eugene Lee, Hyun Joo Song, Natasha Wicke & Olga Ulanova	December 12, 2014	224
51	12	"Day of the Colossus"	Ian Graham	Tim Hedrick	Chris Palmer, William Ruzicka, Steve Ahn, Chuck Drost, Johane Matte & Carli Squitieri	December 19, 2014	225
52	13	"The Last Stand"	Melchior Zwyer	Michael Dante DiMartino	Elsa Garagarza, Shaun O'Neil & Owen Sullivan	December 19, 2014	226

== Ratings ==
The Legend of Korra : U.S. viewers per episode (millions)

Season	Episode number													
Season	1	2	3	4	5	6	7	8	9	10	11	12	13	14
1	4.55	4.55	3.55	4.08	3.78	3.88	3.45	2.98	3.58	3.54	3.68	3.68	–	
2	2.60	2.60	2.19	2.38	1.10	1.95	1.73	1.73	2.47	2.22	1.87	1.87	2.09	2.09
3	1.50	1.50	1.29	1.19	1.18	1.28	1.33	1.08	–					

Audience measurement performed by Nielsen Media Research

== DVD and Blu-ray releases ==
=== Region 1 ===
Book 1: Air box set			Book 2: Spirits box set			Book 3: Change box set			Book 4: Balance box set			Complete Series box set		
Released	Discs	Episodes	Released	Discs	Episodes	Released	Discs	Episodes	Released	Discs	Episodes	Released	Discs	Episodes
July 9, 2013	2	12	July 1, 2014	2	14	December 2, 2014	2	13	March 10, 2015	2	13	December 13, 2016	8	52
