= Amon (The Legend of Korra) =

Character from The Legend of Korra

- Avatar Legends character
- An early concept illustration of Amon by Bryan Konietzko, from The Legend of Korra: The Art of the Animated Series – Book One: Air (p. 30).
- First appearance: "Welcome to Republic City" (2012)
- Last appearance: "Remembrances" (2014)
- Created by: Michael Dante DiMartino; Bryan Konietzko; Joaquim Dos Santos
- Voiced by: Steven Blum; Jacob Bertrand (child; age 6); Alexander Martella (child; age 14)

In-universe information
- Alias: Noatak
- Gender: Male
- Occupation: Leader of the Equalists
- Family: Tarrlok (brother, deceased); Yakone (father, deceased); Unnamed mother
- Nationality: Northern Water Tribe
- Bending element: Waterbending, Bloodbending

Amon (阿蒙; ā Méng), born as Noatak, is a fictional character in Nickelodeon's animated television series The Legend of Korra, and is part of the Avatar: The Last Airbender world. Amon first appeared in the series' premiere, Welcome to Republic City, and is the main antagonist of the first season. The character was created by Michael Dante DiMartino and Bryan Konietzko, with collaboration from Joaquim Dos Santos, and is voiced by Steven Blum.

Amon is a leader of an anti-bender revolutionary group known as the Equalists and claimed to be an innocent non-bender who had been granted by the spirits the ability to permanently remove a person's bending, a power previously demonstrated only by Avatar Aang.

== Appearances ==
He is introduced as the mysterious masked leader of the Equalists, a revolutionary group in Republic City that opposes bending and calls for equality between benders and non-benders. Claiming to be a non-bender whose face was disfigured by a firebender, Amon quickly gains a following by exploiting social unrest and promising to eliminate the power imbalance through the removal of bending.

Amon first publicly demonstrates his ability during an underground rally known as "The Revelation", where he removes the firebending of crime boss Lightning Bolt Zolt in front of a crowd, including Avatar Korra and Mako. Over time, his movement gains momentum as he targets bender-run gangs and criticizes the ruling council for its inaction, painting the Equalist cause as the only path to true justice. He repeatedly outmaneuvers law enforcement and embarrasses city officials, eventually leading a successful attack on the Pro-bending Arena, where he strips Tahno of his bending and delivers a warning to the city. Amon and the Equalists started a revolution and attacked Republic City. They were assisted by Hiroshi Sato, the father of Asami Sato, who was on the opposite side of the war.

As Korra becomes more involved in opposing the Equalists, Amon continues to display his tactical brilliance. He defeats several benders, including Bolin and councilman Tarrlok, and spares Korra during their first confrontation, claiming he will "save her for last". His ability to remove bending is eventually revealed to be a form of bloodbending, an advanced and illegal technique he mastered in childhood. Despite his claims of spiritual empowerment, Amon is later unmasked as Noatak, the eldest son of the criminal Yakone and the older brother of Tarrlok.

His past is revealed by Tarrlok, who recounts their childhood under Yakone, who trained them in bloodbending from a young age. Noatak ran away after turning against their father, eventually resurfacing years later as Amon. His use of bloodbending to block chi paths mimics the Avatar's energybending, giving the illusion of permanently removing someone's abilities.

During the Equalist takeover of Republic City, Amon captures Tenzin and his family and nearly defeats Korra by removing three of her bending abilities. However, Korra unexpectedly unlocks airbending, turning the tide. After being blasted out of a window into the bay, Amon instinctively uses waterbending to save himself, exposing his true identity in front of his followers. With his movement dismantled and reputation destroyed, Amon flees the city with Tarrlok by boat. While Amon speaks of starting over, Tarrlok uses an Equalist electric glove to ignite the fuel tank, killing them both.

=== Personality and characteristics ===
In season one finale, Amon applied face paint to simulate burn scars, which he revealed when questioned by Korra about the truth of his past.

As a child, Amon was compassionate and fair-minded, protecting his younger brother Tarrlok from their father's verbal abuse. Years of bloodbending training and the weight of his father's expectations gradually hardened him, leading to emotional detachment and a lack of empathy toward his victims, including Tarrlok. He ultimately embraced his power and independence by stopping Yakone's abuse, asserting dominance over him, and condemning him as weak.

Amon was a calculating and manipulative strategist who executed his plans with precision and foresight. To support his fabricated backstory, he created a false burn scar, reinforcing his image as a victim of bender oppression.

In the fourth season (Book Four: Balance), Korra gets a hallucination, where Amon removed her bending. Amon is mentioned by Toph Beifong, who tells Korra that while he fought for the wrong side, his desire for "equality" for all was a reasonable motive.

== Creation and conception ==
Amon's character were designed by Bryan Konietzko and Joaquim Dos Santos. Amon went through several developmental challenges. Konietzko noted that portraying Amon/Noatak's early years was considered difficult. However, animation designers Il-Kwang Kim and Jin-Sun Kim quickly captured the character, and Konietzko approved their work without realizing that Noatak's hairstyle was identical to that of Korra. Although he initially wished to change it, the production process made revisions impractical. Konietzko later regarded the similarity as an interesting and unexpected connection between Korra and Noatak, suggesting that despite their differences in the story, both characters share cultural commonalities. Co-creator Michael Dante DiMartino stated that bloodbending, first introduced in the original series, is a rare variation of waterbending. Yakone later advanced the technique, learning how to psychically bloodbend another person. He then passed this skill on to his son, Noatak, who discovered how to use bloodbending to disrupt a bender's chi, rendering them unable to bend.

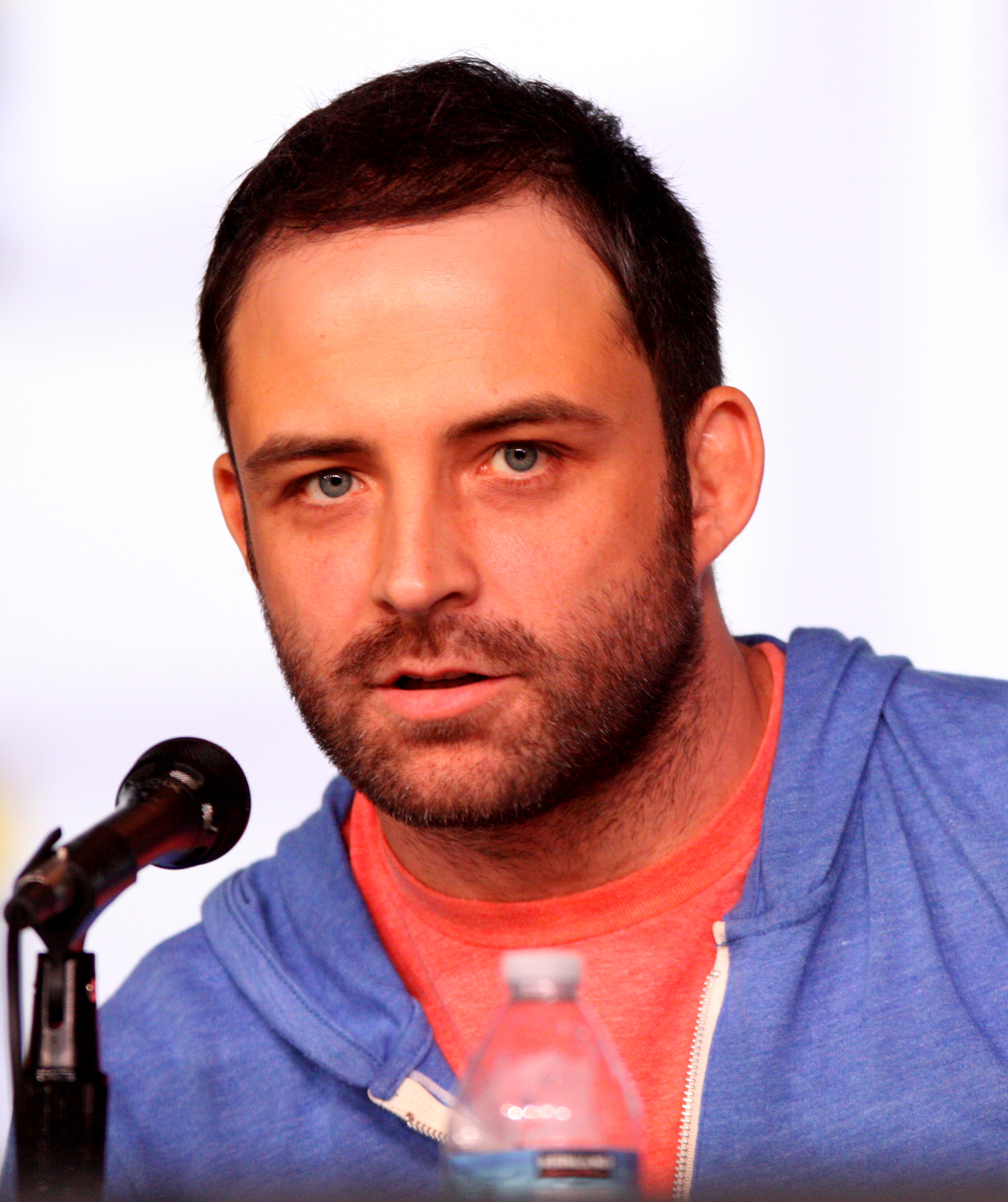
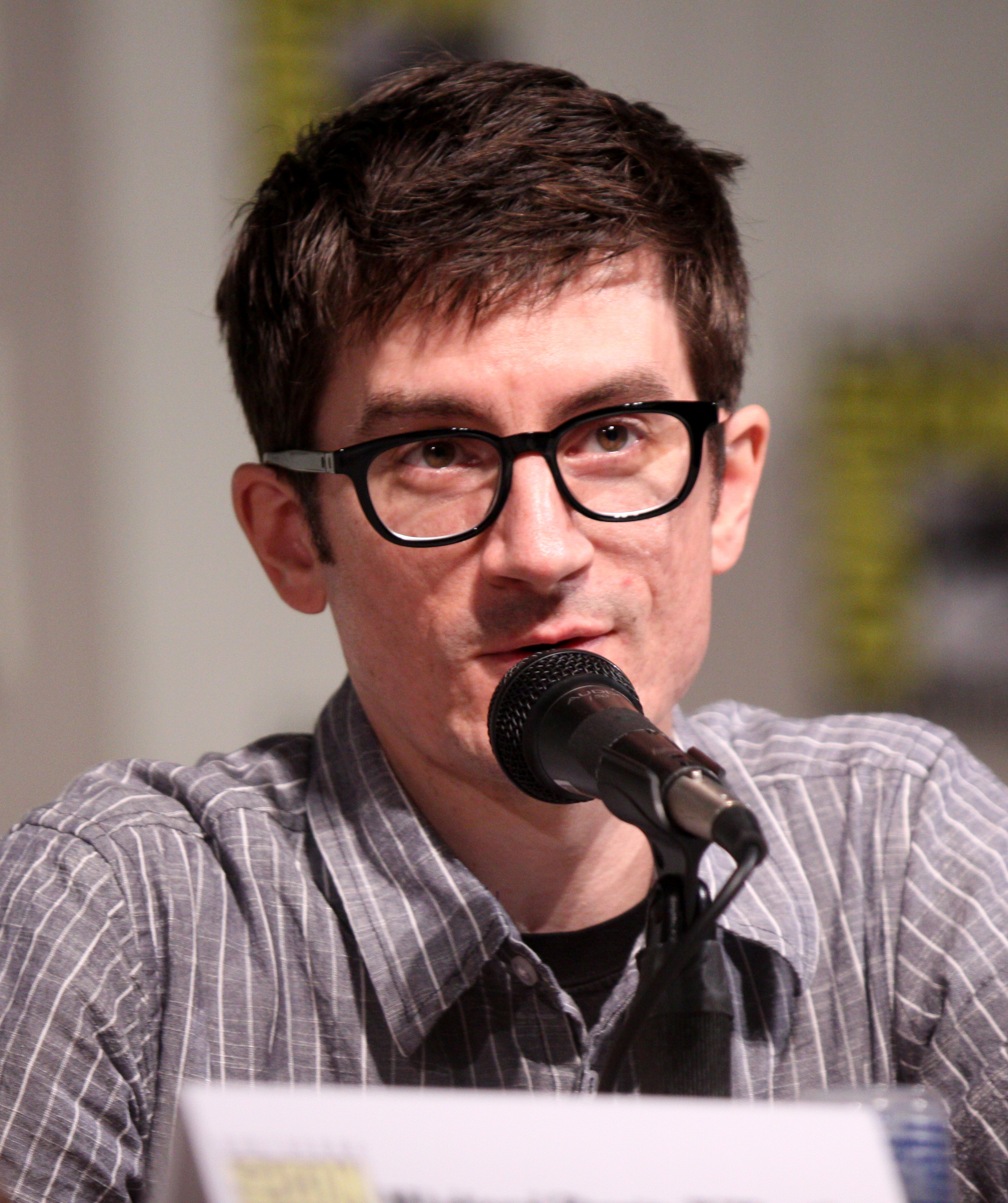
The character's body and costume were designed by Joaquim Dos Santos (left), while his mask created by Bryan Konietzko (right).

Amon's body and costume were designed by Dos Santos, while his mask was designed by Konietzko. According to Konietzko, Amon's mask was designed to reference Chinese and Korean masks and face painting traditions, while remaining simple enough for animators to draw and "iconic" enough to be a symbol of the Equalist revolution. DiMartino, stated that the idea for Amon's mask came from his and fellow co-creator Konietzko's interest in "mysterious antagonists with masks", DiMartino explained that Amon was intended to be a mysterious figure whose origins and ultimate goal were unknown, with the story designed so that the audience would learn about him alongside Korra. He noted that Amon's fearsome presence comes from the uncertainty surrounding him, making the conflict more complex than simply defeating a villain.

Amon was voiced by Steve Blum. According to Blum that his performance was noted for emphasizing the character's dual role as both a conceptual and physical threat, making the character a high point among antagonists in the Avatar franchise. Also, under the name Noatak, at age six was voiced by Jacob Bertrand, while at age fourteen he was voiced by Alexander Martella.

== Abilities ==
Amon is an exceptionally skilled waterbender and bloodbender, trained from childhood by his father, Yakone, a notorious crime lord during Avatar Aang's era.

=== Waterbending ===
From a young age, Amon displayed prodigious talent in waterbending, quickly mastering the discipline under Yakone's strict instruction. Tarrlok described him as the most powerful bender he had ever encountered. During a confrontation with Korra and Mako, Amon concealed his identity as a waterbender from the people of Republic City to maintain the image of a non-bender and further his cause. He ultimately used waterbending to escape.

=== Bloodbending ===
Amon mastered bloodbending by the age of fourteen, performing it without the aid of a full moon and without any gestures or physical movements.

== Reception ==
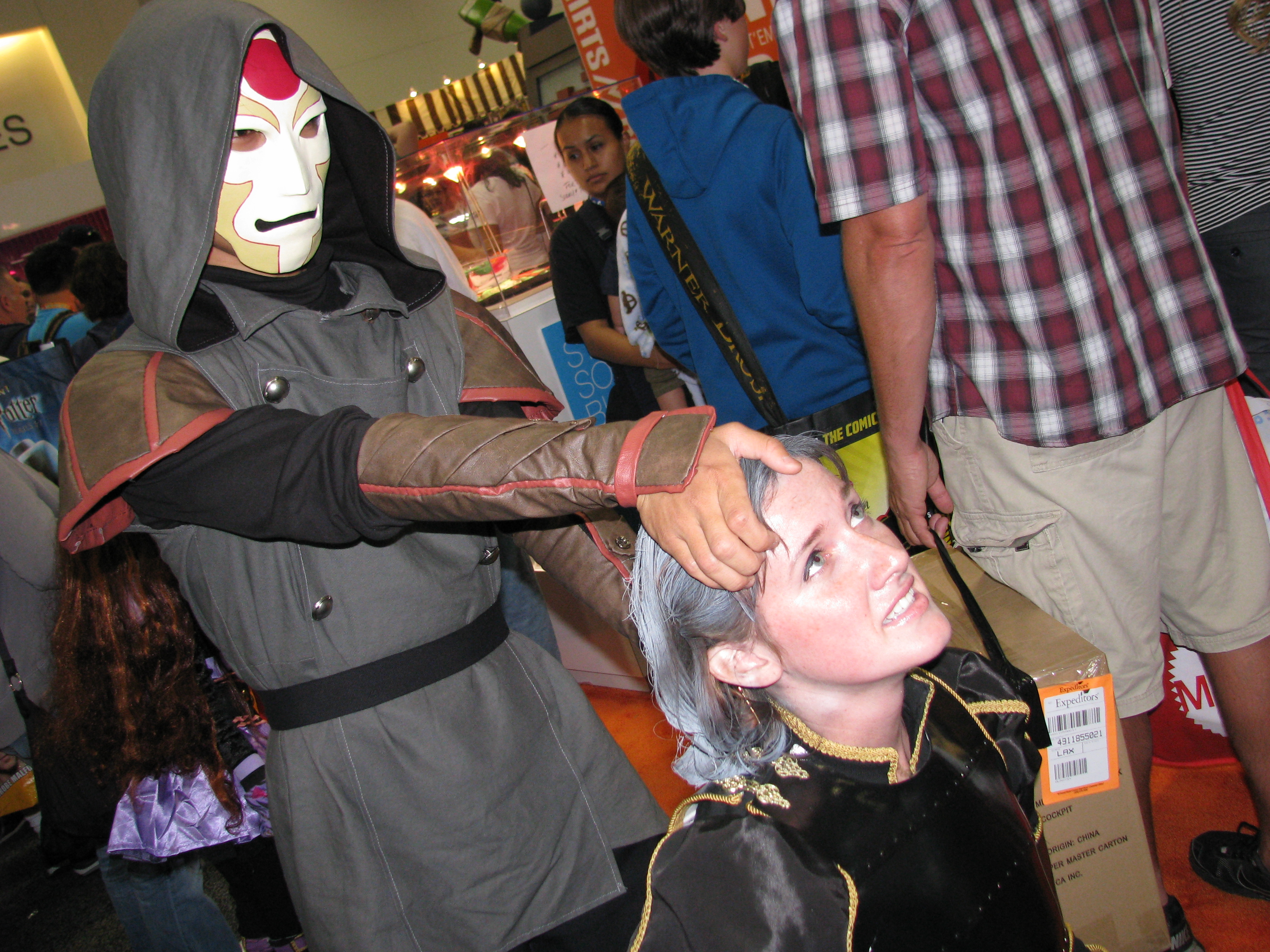
Cosplayers depicting Amon removing Lin Beifong's bending at San Diego Comic-Con in 2012.

Some critics have regarded Amon as one of the most memorable antagonists in The Legend of Korra. Writing for Max Nicholson of IGN stated that Amon is portrayed as a more "sympathetic" figure than Fire Lord Ozai, although he is similarly radical in his beliefs and actions. He also noted that, in his opening speech, Amon raised a few valid points. Lewis Kemner of Comic Book Resources noted that Amon's mask is modeled after Korean and Chinese traditional patterns, and the red disc on his forehead corresponds to the one associated with the Egyptian god of the same name. He compared the character to Guy Fawkes, and also emphasized that Noatak's hairstyle in his youth is similar to Korra, and wrote about Amon's charisma, which allowed him to lead people. Devin Meenan of SlashFilm described Amon as a "populist" leader whose aims are unique to the fictional world of Avatar. As proof of that, the character shows fascist traits, pointing to his cult-like leadership and the Equalists' portrayal of benders as an "other". Sam Reynolds of The Dot and Line stated that one of the most compelling aspects of Amon's character is the influence of real-life historical figures. He compared him to dictators and revolutionaries throughout history, noting that his villainy lies in the way he employs seemingly idealistic viewpoints to persuade and inspire his followers. He also stated that Amon's words are carefully chosen, his actions meticulously executed, and his image and voice, provided by Steve Blum, contribute significantly to the character's impact.
