= Bailin =

Bailin may refer to:

- Bailin bracket, piece of grip equipment used in film production
- 柏林 (disambiguation), transliterated as Bólín or Bǎilín

== Surname ==
- Alex Bailin (born 1969), English barrister
- Gladys Bailin (born 1930), American choreographer, dancer, and instructor
