= Rebel Soul =

Rebel Soul may refer to:

- Rebel Soul (Bonfire album), 1997
- Rebel Soul (Kid Rock album), 2012
- "Rebel Soul", a song by Bis from the album The New Transistor Heroes
- "Rebel Soul", a song by Gotthard from the album Need to Believe

== See also ==
- "Rebel Spirit", the second season premiere of The Legend of Korra, 2013
