= 柏林 =

柏林, meaning "cypress forest", may refer to:

In the Mandarin Chinese reading bólín or bǎilín:

- Bailin station, station of the Wuhan Metro
- Chi Po-lin (1964–2017), Taiwanese documentary filmmaker
- Choti Lamsam (伍柏林), Thai businessman
- Hao Bailin (1934–2018), Chinese theoretical physicist
- Zhu Bailin (朱柏麟), Chinese actor who was cast in the television series General's Lady

== See also ==
- Bailin (disambiguation)
- Bolin, a given name and surname
- Hakurindai Station (柏林台駅), railway station in Obihiro, Hokkaidō, Japan
