= Bolin =

Bolin is a surname or given name.

== Given name ==
- Bolin Chetia, Indian politician
- Chen Bolin (born 1983), Taiwanese actor
- Chi Po-lin (1964–2017), Taiwanese documentary filmmaker
- Liu Bolin (born 1973), Chinese performance artist "The Invisible Man"

== Surname ==
- Anatole Bolin (1893–1983), Swedish champion middle-distance runner
- Bert Bolin (1925–2007), Swedish meteorologist
- Bob Bolin (1939–2023), American Major League Baseball pitcher
- Bookie Bolin (born 1940), former American football offensive lineman
- Charles E. Bolin (1843–1924), American politician
- Enrique Bolín (1940–2018), Spanish politician
- Fredrik Th. Bolin (1931–2005), Norwegian newspaper editor
- James Bolin (1843–1939), American Union soldier, Helen Viola Jackson's husband
- Hugo Bolin (born 2003), Swedish footballer
- James E. Bolin (1914–2002), American politician and judge
- Jane Bolin (1908–2007), American judge
- Jim Bolin (born 1950), American politician
- Luis Bolín (1894–1969), Spanish lawyer
- Michael F. Bolin (born 1948), American lawyer
- Oscar Ray Bolin (1962–2016), American serial killer
- Rolf Ling Bolin (1901–1973), American academic ichthyologist
- Shannon Bolin (1917–2016), American actress and singer
- Tommy Bolin (1951–1976), American guitarist and songwriter
- Wesley Bolin (1909–1978), American politician

== Fictional characters ==
- Bolin (The Legend of Korra), a major character in the animated series The Legend of Korra

== See also ==
- Bolin Branch, Bearskin Creek in Pittsylvania County, Virginia
- Boline (knife)
- Boleyn, a surname
- Bohlin, a surname
- Bowline, a knot
- 柏林 (disambiguation)
