= Bohli =

Bohli is a surname. Notable people with the surname include:

- Raïs M'Bolhi (born 1986), Algerian football player
- Stéphane Bohli (born 1983), Swiss tennis player
- Tom Bohli (born 1994), Swiss cyclist

== See also ==
- Bohlin
- Boli (disambiguation)
