= The Southern Lights =

- The Legend of Korra episode
- Avatar Korra fights dark spirits at the spirit portal near the South Pole.
- Episode no.: Season 2 Episode 2
- Directed by: Ian Graham
- Written by: Joshua Hamilton
- Production code: 114
- Original air date: September 13, 2013
- Running time: 23 minutes

Episode chronology
← Previous "Rebel Spirit"	Next → "Civil Wars"

"The Southern Lights" is the second episode of the second season of the American animated television series The Legend of Korra, a sequel to Avatar: The Last Airbender, and the 14th episode overall. Like the previous episode, the story of this episode was written by Michael Dante DiMartino and Bryan Konietzko; meanwhile, the episode was written by Joshua Hamilton and directed by Ian Graham. The episode originally aired on Nickelodeon in the United States on September 13, 2013, immediately after the season premiere, "Rebel Spirit".

== Plot ==
Unalaq, Korra's new teacher, strikes out with the Avatar, her friends and his children for an expedition to the South Pole, where he wants Korra to open a portal to the spirit world. He explains that the South's estrangement from the spiritual world has caused the spirits to rage in an "Everstorm" around the pole, instead of dancing as lights in the sky as in the North.

Despite his apparent dislike for his brother Unalaq, Korra's father Tonraq insists on accompanying the party. He reveals to Korra that his father, the chieftain, banished him from the North for causing a spirit rampage by destroying a forest in pursuit of bandits. Learning of this, and in the last episode that it was Tenzin and Tonraq, rather than Aang, who directed Korra grow up sheltered at the South Pole, an angry Korra orders her father to leave.

Meanwhile, Tenzin and his family arrive at the Southern Air Temple, where they are being fawned over by the Air Acolytes. Tenzin's eldest daughter Jinora is drawn to the statues of the previous Avatars, particularly those of Aang and an ancient Avatar she does not recognize. At that time, Korra manages to open the spirit portal despite being assailed by dark spirits, thereby relighting the Southern Lights. Upon returning to the festival, the party is witness to an invasion of Northern Water Tribe troops. Their purpose is, according to Unalaq, to help the South "get back on its righteous path" and to unite the two tribes.

== Reception ==
=== Ratings ===
The first U.S. airing of "Rebel Spirit" and "The Southern Lights" on Nickelodeon was seen by 2.6 million viewers.

=== Critical response ===
Max Nicholson of IGN praised the episode for its fight scenes, its worldbuilding and the introduction of Jinora's story arc, while noting that the episode was loaded with much exposition.

Several publications reviewed the two premiere episodes jointly. The A.V. Club's Emily Guendelsberger noted that they kept up the first season's plot's "breckneck pace" and appeared intent on signaling a break with the convention of avoiding death in children's entertainment, by showing a spirit dragging a sailor to his likely death in the sea. She appreciated the nuanced portrayal of Korra's and Mako's relationship and Korra's character flaws, but remarked that Unalaq was being set up as the season's antagonist a bit too obviously. At TV.com, Noel Kirkpatrick commented favorably on how "one of television's best programs" handled the necessary quantity of exposition, and on its introduction of the theme of conflict between spiritualism and secularism. Writing for Vulture, Matt Patches highlighted the loose, handheld-style cinematography – challenging for an animated series – and the "weird, wonderful", wildly imagined spirits fought by Korra; "a Kaiju parade with beasts that mirror velociraptors".
