= Bohlin =

Bohlin is a surname of notable people including:

- Adolf Bohlin (1873–1964), Swedish missionary
- Allan Bohlin (1907–1959), Swedish film actor
- Birger Bohlin (1898–1990), Swedish palaeontologist
- Britt Bohlin Olsson (born 1956), Swedish social democratic politician
- Carl-Oskar Bohlin (born 1986), Swedish moderate politician
- Ella Bohlin (born 1979), Christian Democratic politician in Sweden
- Erik Bohlin (1897–1977), Swedish road racing cyclist
- Folke Bohlin (sailor) (1903–1972), Swedish sailor
- Folke Bohlin (musicologist) (born 1931), Swedish musicologist
- Kjell Bohlin (1928–2011), Norwegian politician
- Nils Bohlin (1920–2002), Swedish inventor
- Peter Bohlin (born 1937), American architect
- Ragnar Bohlin (born 1965), Swedish conductor
- Ross Bohlin, former Australian politician
- Sinikka Bohlin (born 1947), Swedish social democratic politician
- Yoie Bohlin (born 1990), Swedish sportswoman

== See also ==
- Bohlin Cywinski Jackson, United States -based architectural practice
- Bolin
