= Beginnings (The Legend of Korra) =

- The Legend of Korra episodes
- Wan watching Raava and Vaatu fight.
- Episode nos.: Season 2 Episodes 7 and 8
- Directed by: Colin Heck (Part One); Ian Graham (Part Two)
- Written by: Michael Dante DiMartino (Part one); Tim Hedrick (Part two)
- Production code: 119-120
- Original air date: October 18, 2013

Guest appearances
- Steven Yeun as Avatar Wan; Serena Williams as Fire Sage; James Garret as Avatar Roku; D. B. Sweeney as Aang

Episode chronology
← Previous "The Sting"	Next → "The Guide"
- The Legend of Korra season 2

"Beginnings" is the seventh and eighth episode of the second season of the American animated television series The Legend of Korra, a sequel to Avatar: The Last Airbender, and the 19th and the 20th episode overall. Both parts aired on October 18, 2013 on the United States Nickelodeon. "Beginnings, Part 1" was directed by Colin Heck and written by the series co-creator Michael Dante DiMartino, while "Beginnings, Part 2" was directed by Ian Graham and written by Tim Hedrick. The two-part episode follows the story of Wan (Steven Yeun), who becomes the first Avatar, and received positive reviews from critics.

== Plot ==
=== Part One ===
After losing her memory and waking up in a Fire Nation island, (Note: As depicted in "The Sting") Korra is found by the Fire Sages. In order to restore her memory and remove the dark energy inside her, the sages place Korra in the sacred water. Korra meets her past incarnations, who ask her to find Raava and show her the story of the first Avatar to help her remember who she is.

10,000 years ago, humans lived on the shells of the lion turtles in order to protect themselves from dangerous spirits. Wan and his friends live in poverty and hunger, while the Chu family has enough food for the whole city but does nothing to help them. In order to protect humans, the lion turtles grant them the power to bend elements for a limited time when they venture into the wilds.

Wan and some of his fellow citizens ask from their city's lion turtle to give them the ability to firebend so as to go to the forest and find food. Wan pretends to be afraid of the spirits, and goes back to the city without returning his abilities to the lion turtle. He manages to persuade the citizens to steal food from the Chu, but their mission fails when Wan decides to spare the life of one of its members. Wan is banished from the city and is sent to the forest, with the lion turtle allowing him to keep his firebending. He befriends the spirits and lives with them for two years, until he decides to travel to the other cities.

Upon his journey, Wan meets two spirits who are apparently fighting. One of the spirits tells him that the other spirit is torturing him for ten thousand years and asks him to help him escape. Wan does what he asks, but the other spirit tells him that he made a huge mistake. The spirit reveals that she is Raava, the spirit of light, and that the spirit that Wan helped escape is Vaatu, the spirit of darkness and war.

=== Part Two ===
Wan discovers another lion turtle city inhabited by airbenders, but when he approaches them Vaatu appears, taking all the spirits with him and threatening to destroy the world. Wan asks Raava to help him master all the other elements in order to be ready to fight Vaatu when the 'Harmonic Convergence' begins, during which Raava and Vaatu will fight for the fate of the world. Wan manages to persuade her by reminding her she cannot stop Vaatu alone, as she becomes increasingly drained. During the next year, Wan masters all four elements while the world is in chaos.

Wan and Raava arrive at the Southern spirit portal, where they fight Vaatu, with Raava inhabiting Wan's body to make him more powerful. While all hope seems lost and the Harmonic Convergence begins, Wan and Raava manage to fuse together forever, becoming the first ever Avatar. In order to stop the war between humans and spirits, Wan persuades the spirits to go back to the spirit world and closes the portals.

After many years, an elderly Wan apologizes to Raava for failing to restore peace. Raava assures him that their mission is not over yet, as she will accompany him throughout his lifetimes. Wan dies and the cycle of the Avatar begins. Korra wakes up, having her memories back, and leaves the island.

== Reception ==
=== Ratings ===
The two-part episode's premiere was watched by 1.73 million viewers, the second lowest viewership for the series up until then.

=== Critical response ===
IGN rated the episodes 9.6/10, praising the animation style, the plot, and Wan's character, comparing him to Aladdin. Writing for The A.V. Club, Emily Guendelsberger also gave a positive review, praising the fact that the episode tells a standalone story and that it takes a break from Korra's "complicated and gray and long-term" story.
