= Steve Blum =

American voice actor (born 1960)

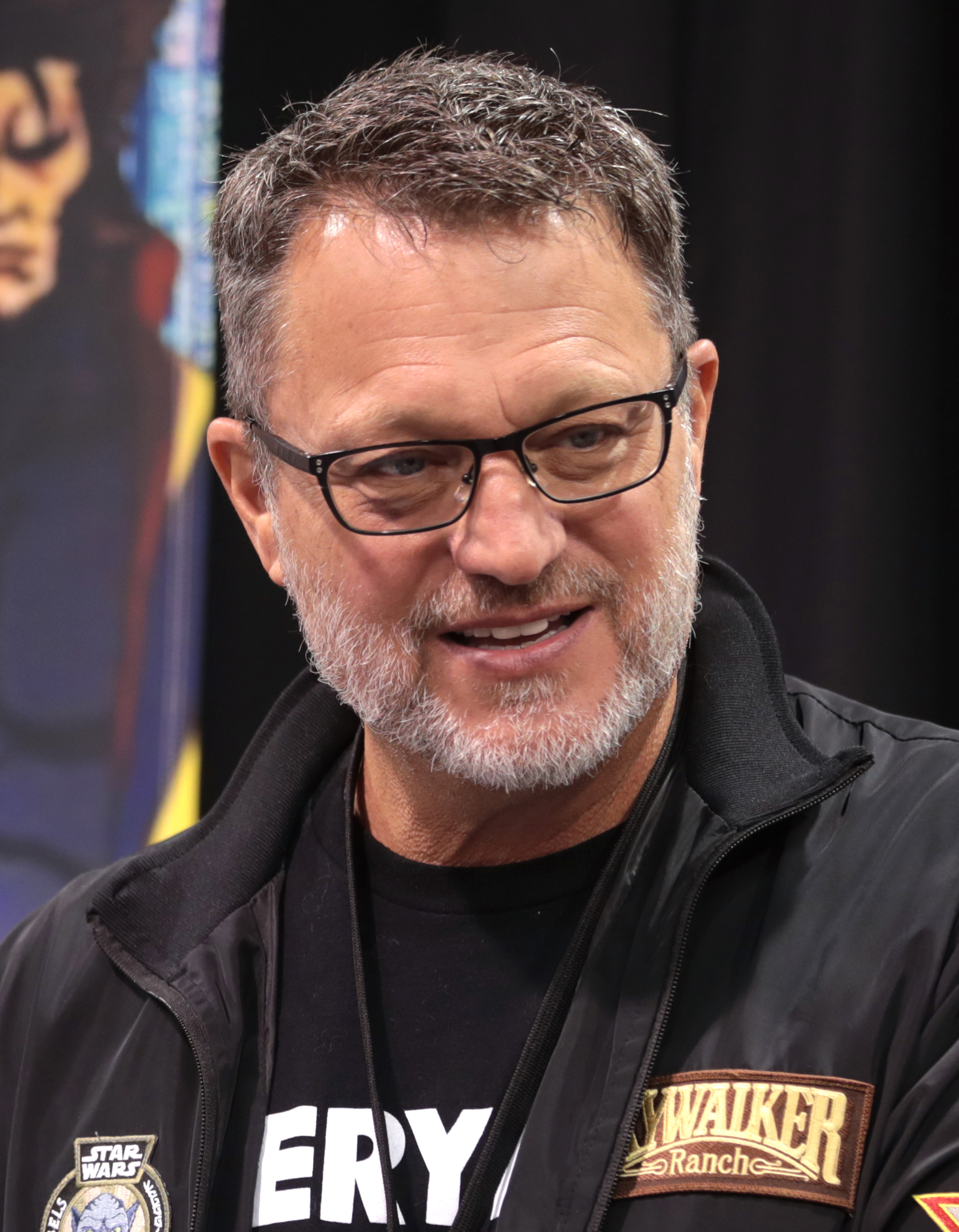
- Blum at the 2023 WonderCon
- Born: Steven Jay Blum; April 29, 1960 (age 66); Santa Monica, California, U.S.
- Occupation: Voice actor
- Years active: 1992–present
- Spouse: Mary Elizabeth McGlynn (m. 2017)
- Children: 3
- Website: steveblumvoices.com

Steven Jay Blum (/bluːm/; born April 29, 1960) is an American voice actor. Known for his distinctively deep voice, his roles include Spike Spiegel from the anime series Cowboy Bebop; Amon from The Legend of Korra; Heatblast, Ghostfreak, and Vilgax from Ben 10; Star Wars franchise; Starscream from Transformers: Prime; Sub-Zero from the Mortal Kombat franchise; Tank Dempsey from the Call of Duty Zombies franchise; Ares in God of War, God of War: Ghost of Sparta, and God of War: Ascension; and Wolverine from Marvel's Wolverine and the X-Men, Marvel Anime: X-Men, and various other projects featuring the character.

Blum has also been credited as David Lucas, Richard Cardona, Roger Canfield, Tom Baron, and Daniel Andrews in various anime and other live-action appearances.

== Early life ==
Steven Jay Blum was born on April 29, 1960, to a Jewish family in Santa Monica, California. As a child, Blum was overweight and bullied. To cope with these struggles, he would often draw, sculpt and create music. He would also often go outside and observe nature, marveling at sounds, shapes, and colors. When he was 12 years old, Blum worked at the comic section of his grandfather's book store in Hollywood, California where he would sort and catalogue titles. He was a huge fan of cartoons and would often do impressions. Blum started doing impressions by request after leaving a voicemail with the voice of Goofy.

== Career ==
Blum started his career working at the mail room of film studio Empire International Pictures. The head of the mailroom offered him a job on a "Japanimation" project since he had the deepest voice. Blum would eventually become head of marketing at a studio while doing voice acting on the side before deciding to become a voice actor full time. His credits include the voice of Spike Spiegel in Cowboy Bebop, Zeb Orrelios in Star Wars Rebels, Mugen in Samurai Champloo, Roger Smith from The Big O, Orochimaru, and Zabuza Momochi in Naruto and Wolverine in multiple Marvel productions. In video games, he provided the voice of main protagonist Jack Cayman in MadWorld, Captain Foley and Tank Dempsey in the Call of Duty series, Professor Galvez in Metal Gear Solid: Peace Walker, Ares in God of War, and God of War: Ascension, main protagonist Grayson Hunt in Bulletstorm, Brimstone in Valorant, Zoltun Kulle in Diablo III, Grunt in Mass Effect, Sub-Zero in Mortal Kombat X and 11, Hal Jordan / Green Lantern in Injustice 2, Rytlock Brimstone in Guild Wars 2, and main protagonist Capt. Devin Ross in Clive Barker's Jericho.

Starting in 2000, Blum was the voice of TOM, the robotic host of Cartoon Network's Toonami programming block. He replaced Sonny Strait in the character's subsequent appearances, until the cancellation of Toonami in 2008. When Toonami was revived on March 31, 2012, he returned as the voice of TOM. He is also the announcer for 7-Eleven's "Oh Thank Heaven" television and radio advertisements and partnered with Vic Mignogna in the series Real Fans of Genius (a parody of Anheuser-Busch's Real Men of Genius radio ad campaign).

In animation, he is the voice of Heatblast, Ghostfreak and Vilgax in the Ben 10 franchise; Garazeb Orrelios in Star Wars Rebels; Count Vertigo in DC Showcase: Green Arrow and Young Justice; Wolverine, Red Skull, and Beta Ray Bill in Wolverine and the X-Men and The Avengers: Earth's Mightiest Heroes; Starscream in Transformers: Prime; Heatwave in Transformers: Rescue Bots; and Amon in the first season of the Nickelodeon animated series The Legend of Korra.

On June 5, 2012, he was awarded a Guinness World Record for being the most prolific video game voice actor, having 261 credited appearances as of May 10, 2012.

== Personal life ==
Blum married voice actress Mary Elizabeth McGlynn in 2017. He has three sons from a prior relationship. One of them, Brandon, is also an actor, while another, Jeremy, is a teacher. Blum enjoys collecting reptiles, fish and birds.

== Filmography ==
Preceded by Sam Riegel	Voice of Starscream; 2010–present	Succeeded by Charlie Adler
Preceded by Brendan O'Brien	English voice of Crash Bandicoot; 2003	Succeeded by Jess Harnell
Preceded by Hugh Jackman	Actor portrayed/voiced Wolverine; 2008–present	Succeeded by Hugh Jackman
