= Milton, Illinois =

Milton
- Village
- Location of Milton in Pike County, Illinois.
- Coordinates: 39°33′53″N 90°39′00″W
- Country: United States
- State: Illinois
- County: Pike

Area
  - Total: 0.39 sq mi (1.00 km^{2})
  - Land: 0.39 sq mi (1.00 km^{2})
  - Water: 0 sq mi (0.00 km^{2})
- Elevation: 676 ft (206 m)

Population (2020)
  - Total: 214
  - Density: 554.9/sq mi (214.24/km^{2})
- Time zone: UTC-6 (CST)
  - Summer (DST): UTC-5 (CDT)
- ZIP code: 62352
- Area code: 217
- FIPS code: 17-49477
- GNIS feature ID: 2399366

Milton is a village in Pike County, Illinois, United States. As of the 2020 census, Milton had a population of 214.

== History ==
Charles E. Bolin (1843–1924), Illinois state representative and businessman, lived in Milton.

== Geography ==
According to the 2010 census, Milton has a total area of 0.38 square miles (0.98 km^{2}), all land.

== Demographics ==
Historical population
Census	Pop.	Note	%±
1870	354		—
1880	457		29.1%
1890	415		−9.2%
1900	420		1.2%
1910	330		−21.4%
1920	348		5.5%
1930	332		−4.6%
1940	327		−1.5%
1950	337		3.1%
1960	309		−8.3%
1970	337		9.1%
1980	349		3.6%
1990	270		−22.6%
2000	274		1.5%
2010	271		−1.1%
2020	214		−21.0%
U.S. Decennial Census

As of the census of 2000, there were 274 people, 107 households, and 77 families residing in the village. The population density was 731.0 inhabitants per square mile (282.2/km^{2}). There were 122 housing units at an average density of 325.5 per square mile (125.7/km^{2}). The racial makeup of the village was 100.00% White. Hispanic or Latino of any race were 0.36% of the population.

There were 107 households, out of which 33.6% had children under the age of 18 living with them, 56.1% were married couples living together, 11.2% had a female householder with no husband present, and 28.0% were non-families. 25.2% of all households were made up of individuals, and 13.1% had someone living alone who was 65 years of age or older. The average household size was 2.47 and the average family size was 2.95.

In the village, the population was spread out, with 25.5% under the age of 18, 9.5% from 18 to 24, 29.2% from 25 to 44, 16.4% from 45 to 64, and 19.3% who were 65 years of age or older. The median age was 34 years. For every 100 females, there were 74.5 males. For every 100 females age 18 and over, there were 74.4 males.

The median income for a household in the village was $26,591, and the median income for a family was $28,333. Males had a median income of $26,786 versus $18,281 for females. The per capita income for the village was $11,847. About 10.8% of families and 10.0% of the population were below the poverty line, including 13.9% of those under the age of eighteen and 3.2% of those sixty five or over.
