= Civil Wars (The Legend of Korra) =

- The Legend of Korra episodes
- Avatar Korra fending off her own people's contempt as she attempts to deescalate clashes between Southern and Northern tribesmen.
- Episode nos.: Season 2 Episodes 3 and 4
- Directed by: Colin Heck (Part One); Ian Graham (Part Two)
- Written by: Michael Dante DiMartino
- Production code: 115-116
- Original air dates: September 20, 2013 (Part 1); September 27, 2013 (Part 2)

Episode chronology
← Previous "The Southern Lights"	Next → "Peacekeepers"

"Civil Wars" are the third and fourth episodes of the second season of the American animated television series The Legend of Korra, a sequel to Avatar: The Last Airbender, and the 15th and the 16th episodes overall. Part 1 first aired on September 20, 2013, and Part 2 aired on September 27, 2013, on Nickelodeon in the United States. The episodes were written by series co-creator Michael Dante DiMartino. "Civil Wars, Part 1" was directed by Colin Heck and "Civil Wars, Part 2" was directed by Ian Graham. The two-part episode received generally positive reviews from critics, praising the storyline and the subplot involving Tenzin, Kya and Bumi but criticizing the subplot involving Bolin and Eska's troubled relationship.

== Synopsis ==
Tensions and disagreements are suddenly stirring between the Southern and Northern Water Tribes; particularly since Northern soldiers have invaded the Southern tribe's home villages and palace. Avatar Korra attempts to restore harmony and understanding between the two, to no avail. Will the mighty Avatar be able to maintain order between her homeland and its sister tribe, or will everything erupt into chaos?

=== Part One ===
As the Southern Water Tribe chafes under what they perceive as an occupation, Unalaq explains to Korra that he wants to protect the Southern spirit portal and have Korra open its northern counterpart. Varrick, whose business suffers from Unalaq's blockade, begins fomenting a revolt. Korra unsuccessfully tries to keep the peace and prevents an abduction of Unalaq by Southern rebels. As she reconciles with her mother and father, Unalaq appears to arrest them.

Meanwhile, Bolin suffers in an increasingly abusive relationship with the domineering Eska, but is too afraid to break it up. At the Southern Air Temple, Ikki runs away after being teased by Jinora and Meelo, and Tenzin, Kya, and Bumi search for her, falling out with each other over their differing recollections about their childhood with their late father, Avatar Aang.

=== Part Two ===
After her father is sentenced to life in prison for treason, Korra discovers that Unalaq stage-managed the trial, just like Tonraq's earlier banishment, to rid himself of a rival. With the help of her friends and Varrick, Korra breaks Tonraq and other condemned rebels out of prison, also saving Bolin from a forced marriage to Unalaq's enraged daughter Eska. She promises to seek the United Republic's support for the Southern rebellion. At the Southern Air Temple, Ikki and Tenzin each reconcile with their siblings.

== Reception ==
=== Ratings ===
The original broadcast of "Civil Wars, Part 1" on Nickelodeon was seen by 2.19 million viewers, the lowest viewership for the series up until then. Ratings for the second part's first airing were slightly higher, with 2.38 million viewers.

=== Critical response ===
In IGN, Max Nicholson appreciated the series setting up the conflict between the Water Tribes and considered that the story of Aang's and Katara's children "stole the show". He described the subplot about Mako, Bolin and his troubled romance with Eska as weak, as did Emily Guendelsberger, who, writing for The A.V. Club, also felt that the world-building and the character interactions were less developed than in the first season.

At TV.com, Noel Kirkpatrick also described Bolin's scenes as "obligatory 'Oh, we need some humor here' moments" rather than integral parts of the plot, and noted that the pacing felt slow at times because of the amount of setup the plot required, but appreciated the increased development of Korra's character as she faces conflicting loyalties, as well as "another wrinkle of modernization in Korra coming into play" by portraying economic interests as a driver of conflict through Varrick. He also appreciated the nuanced depiction of the dysfunctional relationship among Aang's children, and the less than perfect picture it painted of the later life of the previous series's young hero.
