= Light in the Dark (The Legend of Korra) =

- The Legend of Korra episode
- Korra's spirit fighting Unavaatu.
- Episode no.: Season 2 Episode 14
- Directed by: Ian Graham
- Written by: Michael Dante DiMartino
- Production code: 126
- Original air date: November 22, 2013

Episode chronology
← Previous "Darkness Falls"	Next → "A Breath of Fresh Air"
- The Legend of Korra season 2

"Light in the Dark" is the fourteenth and final episode of the second season of The Legend of Korra, a sequel to Avatar: The Last Airbender, and the 26th episode overall. It was directed by Ian Graham and written by the Avatar franchise co-creator Michael Dante DiMartino. The episode aired on November 22, 2013 on Nickelodeon and received positive reviews from critics.

== Plot ==
Tenzin and his siblings, Kya and Bumi, find Korra, Mako and Bolin wounded and unconscious in the Spirit World. Once healed by Kya, Korra states that with Raava gone the cycle of the Avatar is over and she is most likely the last Avatar. Meanwhile, Unalaq, now bonded with Vaatu, (Note: As depicted in "Darkness Falls") attacks Republic City. Tenzin leads Korra to the Tree of Time, where Vaatu was previously imprisoned, and tells her to meditate within it.

As she meditates, Korra unlocks previously untapped spiritual potential and teleports to Republic City. She discovers that a fragment of Raava lies within Vaatu, as light and dark cannot exist without each other and one will always regrow from within the other. Jinora's spirit shows Korra where it is, and Korra removes Raava from Vaatu, killing Unalaq and defeating Vaatu.

Tenzin, Kya, Bumi, Mako, Bolin, Desna and Eska defend Korra's body from dark spirits attacking them. Korra and Raava return to the Spirit World and use the Harmonic Convergence to re-merge, reforming the Avatar Spirit. However, Korra's link with the previous Avatars apparently remains lost. After deep contemplation, Korra decides to leave the spirit portals open, believing that spirits and humans can find a way to coexist and should be allowed the chance. She also declares the Southern Water Tribe to now be independent from the North as its own state. Korra and Mako decide that they have to end their romantic relationship as it does not seem to work out for them, instead opting to remaining friends by doing their last kiss, but always be there for each other.

== Reception ==
=== Ratings ===
The episode's premiere was watched by 2.09 million viewers, shared with Darkness Falls.

=== Critical response ===
IGN's Max Nicholson rated the episode 9/10, praising the action, the plot, and the music, but criticizing the scene where Jinora's spirit shows Korra that Raava is still within Vaatu, noting that "it really doesn't make that much sense". Writing for The A.V. Club, Emily Guendelsberger agreed with Nicholson that some scenes didn't make sense, but still described it as a finale that is "sort of a perfect encapsulation of the second season".
