= Enrique Bolín =

Spanish industrialist and politician

Enrique Bolín Pérez-Argemí (27 February 1940 – 17 October 2018) was a Spanish industrialist and People's Party politician who served as Mayor of Benalmádena and Senator.

In 1989 he was sentenced to prison for the crime of possession of cocaine, for which he was expelled from the party despite reducing the penalty to a fine, and in 2008 he was sentenced to eight years of disqualification for a crime of urban trespass.

He was the son of Enrique Bolín Bidwell, promoter of tourism and hospitality on the Costa del Sol, and nephew of Luis Bolín, correspondent in London of the newspaper ABC, who rented the Dragon Rapide plane that took Francisco Franco from the Canaries to Tetouan so he could join to the coup d'état in Spain in July 1936 that led to the Spanish Civil War and the fall of the Second Republic.
