= Charles E. Bolin =

American politician and businessman

Charles E. Bolin (April 29, 1843 – April 12, 1924) was an American politician and businessman.

Bolin was born in DeWitt County, Illinois near Wapella, Illinois. Bolin was involved with the banking business in Milton, Illinois in Pike County, Illinois. He served on the Pike County Board and was chairman of the county board. Bolin served in the Illinois House of Representatives from 1907 to 1913 and was a Democrat. Bolin died in Milton, Illinois after suffering a stroke.
