= Bailin bracket =

Grip equipment used in film production

The Bailin bracket is a piece of grip equipment used in film production. The bracket is a slotted metal device, with a 1-1/8" junior pin on one end. It is meant to support a 2x4 or 2x6 piece of wood from any junior pin receiving device.
