= Hao Bailin =

Chinese theoretical physicist

- Born: 26 June 1934; Beijing, China
- Died: 7 March 2018 (aged 83); Beijing, China
- Education: National University of Kharkiv
- Scientific career
- Fields: Theoretical physics
- Workplaces: Fudan University, Institute of Theoretical Physics, CAS

Signature
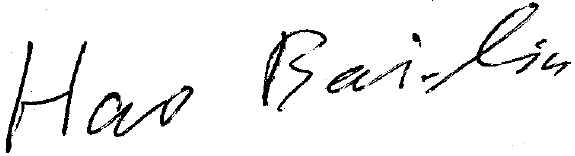

Hao Bailin (Chinese: 郝柏林; pinyin: Hǎo Bǎilín; Wade–Giles: Hao Po-lin; 26 June 1934 – 7 March 2018) was a Chinese theoretical physicist, an academician of the Chinese Academy of Sciences, and Fudan University professor.

== Biography ==
Hao was born in Beijing, 1934. He graduated from then Beijing Russian Institute in 1954, then went to Kharkiv and studied mining at Kharkov Engineering-Economic Institute. He transferred to the Department of Mathematics and Physics, Kharkiv University in 1956 and completed his bachelor's degree in the next three years.

He entered the Institute of Physics, Chinese Academy of Sciences as a trainee researcher afterwards. He went to Moscow State University and Soviet Academy of Sciences for the further studying on physics since 1959.

Hao had meant to become a postgraduate under Lev Landau, but Landau was injured in a road accident in 1962, he returned to China without a postgraduate diploma.

He continued his job in CAS until the Cultural Revolution began. During the decade, he participated the Task 1019 for the military. Hao was elected as an academician of the Chinese Academy of Sciences in 1980. Hao took interdisciplinary research programmes later, he also sequenced DNA since 1997.

== Personal life ==
Hao had three siblings. Their father, Jingsheng was a botanist, thus Bailin was supposedly named after a Chinese native tree, Cupressus funebris.

Hao met Zhang Shuyu, a Chinese student from Jiangxi province, in Kharkiv. They married in the late 1950s, and had two children.

== Death ==
Hao died on 7 March 2018, aged 83.
