= Rebel Spirit =

- The Legend of Korra episode
- The episode establishes the conflict between Unalaq (left), Tenzin (center) and Tonraq (right) for influence over Avatar Korra (center-right).
- Episode no.: Season 2 Episode 1
- Directed by: Colin Heck
- Written by: Tim Hedrick
- Production code: 113
- Original air date: September 13, 2013
- Running time: 23 minutes

Episode chronology
← Previous "Endgame"	Next → "The Southern Lights"

"Rebel Spirit" is the second season premiere of the American animated television series The Legend of Korra, a sequel to Avatar: The Last Airbender, and the 13th episode overall. The episode's story was written by series creators Michael Dante DiMartino and Bryan Konietzko, with screenplay by Tim Hedrick, while was directed by Colin Heck. The episode originally aired on Nickelodeon in the United States on September 13, 2013, immediately followed by the second episode, "The Southern Lights".

== Plot ==
Six months after the end of Book One: Air, Korra believes she has mastered airbending, Mako works as a policeman, Bolin fares poorly in pro-bending with the new "Fire Ferrets", and Asami tries to keep Future Industries afloat.

With Tenzin and his brother Bumi, now retired from the military, the friends visit Korra's and Tenzin's family in the Southern Water Tribe. They reunite with Tenzin's mother Katara and his sister Kya, as well as Korra's parents Tonraq and Senna. Also arriving for the solstice festival is the Northern Water Tribe's chief Unalaq (who is Tonraq's brother) and his twin children Desna and Eska. Unalaq criticizes the Southern Tribe's loss of spirituality and seeks to tutor Korra in the ways of the spirits. Meanwhile, Asami sets up a business deal with the eccentric shipping magnate and movie producer Varrick, and Eska adopts Bolin as her boyfriend.

After an angry spirit attacks the festival, and Korra tries to fight it off to no avail, it is instantly calmed by Unalaq. Despite her father's warnings, Korra chooses Unalaq instead of Tenzin as her spiritual teacher. Tenzin and his family including Kya and Bumi then leave to visit all the air temples while Korra and her friends remain in the South Pole for her to train with her uncle.

== Development ==
The premiere episode was screened in advance at The Legend of Korra panel at San Diego Comic-Con on 19 July 2013, together with the release of a trailer video for Book Two.

== Reception ==
=== Ratings ===
The original broadcast of Rebel Spirit and The Southern Lights on Nickelodeon was seen by 2.6 million viewers.

=== Critical response ===
The premiere episode was positively reviewed after its advance screening by IGN, which appreciated the setup of the overarching conflict and the humorous writing. The reviewer also remarked that "the animation in Book Two has taken yet another step up in quality, with noticeable advances in the action sequences and color treatment".

Several publications reviewed the two premiere episodes jointly. The A.V. Club's Emily Guendelsberger noted that they kept up the first season's plot's "breckneck pace" and appeared intent on signaling a break with the convention of avoiding death in children's entertainment, by showing a spirit dragging a sailor to his likely death in the sea. She appreciated the nuanced portrayal of Korra's and Mako's relationship and Korra's character flaws, but remarked that Unalaq was being set up as the season's antagonist a bit too obviously. At TV.com, Noel Kirkpatrick commented favorably on how "one of television's best programs" handled the necessary quantity of exposition, and on its introduction of the theme of conflict between spiritualism and secularism. Writing for Vulture, Matt Patches highlighted the loose, handheld-style cinematography – challenging for an animated series – and the "weird, wonderful", wildly imagined spirits fought by Korra; "a Kaiju parade with beasts that mirror velociraptors".
