= The Legend of Korra season 2 =

The Legend of Korra
- Season 2 Book Two: Spirits
- Second season DVD cover art; featuring Korra (foreground), along with the spirits Raava and Vaatu (background)
- Showrunners: Michael Dante DiMartino; Bryan Konietzko
- Starring: Janet Varney; David Faustino; P. J. Byrne; Seychelle Gabriel; J. K. Simmons; Mindy Sterling; Dee Bradley Baker; Kiernan Shipka
- No. of episodes: 14

Release
- Original network: Nickelodeon
- Original release: September 13 – November 22, 2013

Season chronology
- ← Previous; Book One: Air Next → Book Three: Change

Book Two: Spirits is the second season of the American animated television series The Legend of Korra created by Michael Dante DiMartino and Bryan Konietzko. It consists of fourteen episodes ("chapters"). It focuses more on spiritual concepts and themes than the preceding season, Book One: Air. Ordered in early 2011, Book Two: Spirits began airing on Nickelodeon in the U.S. on September 13, 2013.

== Premise ==
In a world in which some people can telekinetically control one of the four classical elements, the Avatar is the only individual who can "bend" all four elements and is responsible for maintaining balance in the world. This season focuses on Avatar Korra coming to terms with her role as the liaison between humans and the mystical "Spirit World".

Book Two takes place six months after Book One; its narrative is divided between Republic City (the primary setting of the first season) and other locations such as the Spirit World and the South Pole home of the Southern Water Tribe. Korra's uncle Unalaq, the chief of the Northern Water Tribe, seizes control of the Southern Water Tribe as part of a scheme to free Vaatu, an ancient dark spirit. The story follows Korra's friends' efforts to win support for the southern tribe in Republic City, and Korra's quest to foil Unalaq's plans while learning about spirits. A two-part episode entitled "Beginnings" delves into the history of the Avatar lineage. It tells the story of Wan, the young man who became the first Avatar as a result of his attempts to maintain balance between the material and spirit worlds, and to atone for empowering the dark spirit Vaatu.

New characters introduced in this season include Unalaq and his children Desna and Eska; Kya and Bumi, the siblings of Korra's mentor Tenzin; Varrick, an eccentric and wealthy inventor and businessman from the Southern Water Tribe.

== Episodes ==
No. overall	No. in season	Title	Directed by	Written by	Storyboarded by	Original release date	Prod. code	U.S. viewers (millions)
13	1	"Rebel Spirit"	Colin Heck	Tim Hedrick	Joaquim Dos Santos, Lauren Montgomery, Ki Hyun Ryu, Colin Heck, Owen Sullivan, Olga Ulanova & Hyun Joo Song	September 13, 2013	113	2.60
Six months after the defeat of Amon and the Equalists, Korra believes she has mastered airbending, Mako works as a policeman, Bolin fares poorly in pro-bending with the new "Fire Ferrets", and Asami tries to keep Future Industries intact. Team Avatar joins Tenzin and his family in a visit to the Southern Water Tribe for the winter solstice. The festivities are disrupted by the rampage of a dark spirit, which neither Korra nor Tenzin can calm or repel. Unalaq, Korra's uncle and the chief of the Northern Water Tribe ultimately assuages the spirit's anger with a "spiritual" form of waterbending. Despite the misgivings of her father, who has a strained relationship with his brother, Korra apprentices herself to Unalaq to continue her spiritual development, rebuffing previous mentor Tenzin in the process.
14	2	"The Southern Lights"	Ian Graham	Joshua Hamilton	Joaquim Dos Santos, Lauren Montgomery, Ki Hyun Ryu, Ian Graham, Jay Oliva, Melchior Zwyer & Elsa Garagarza	September 13, 2013	114	2.60
Korra and company journey with Unalaq and his children Desna and Eska to the South Pole, where Korra is to attempt to return the long-absent Southern Lights, at Unalaq's urging. When Korra learns that her father was once banished from the Northern Water Tribe for causing a spirit rampage, and that he and Tenzin were responsible for her seclusion in her youth, she insists on Tonraq returning home, and tensions begin to grow between herself and Tenzin. At the South Pole, Korra succeeds in returning the southern lights by opening a blocked "spirit portal" one of two gateways which allows access to the spirit world and regulates the flow of spiritual energy between the two worlds. Returning from the pole, Korra's party discover that Northern Water Tribe have come to occupy the south at Unalaq's direction, to initiate a "reunification" of the two tribes. At the Southern Air Temple, Jinora is strongly drawn to the statues of the past avatars, particular that of her grandfather Aang and an unidentified carving of another ancient Avatar.
15	3	"Civil Wars"	Colin Heck	Michael Dante DiMartino	Masami Annō, Joaquim Dos Santos, Ki Hyun Ryu, Lauren Montgomery & Colin Heck	September 20, 2013	115	2.19
16	4	"Civil Wars"	Ian Graham	Michael Dante DiMartino	Lee Dae Woo, Kim Sung Hoon & Park So Young; Storyboard revisions by: Owen Sullivan & Melchior Zwyer	September 27, 2013	116	2.38
Part 1: As the Southerners resist Northern occupation, Unalaq offers to protect the southern portal while Korra opens its northern counterpart, claiming that this will deepen the connection between humanity and the spirits and prevent further dark spirit attacks. Eccentric Southern Tribe inventor and entrepreneur Varrick, whose business suffers from Unalaq's blockade, begins a revolt. Korra prevents an abduction of Unalaq by Southern rebels. As she tries to reconcile with her mother, Senna, and Tonraq, Unalaq appears to arrest them for conspiring to assassinate him. At the Southern Air Temple, Ikki disappears and Tenzin, Kya, and Bumi search for her while recalling their childhood with their late father, Avatar Aang. Part 2: After her father is sentenced to life in prison for conspiring to assassinate Unalaq, Korra discovers that Unalaq staged the trial, as well as Tonraq's much earlier banishment from the Northern Tribe, where Tonraq had been expected to succeed as chief. With the help of her friends and Varrick, Korra frees Tonraq and other condemned rebels from prison, and extracts Bolin from an impending forced marriage to Eska. She promises to seek the United Republic's support for the Southern rebellion. At the Southern Air Temple, Ikki and Tenzin each reconcile with their siblings.
17	5	"Peacekeepers"	Colin Heck	Tim Hedrick	Masami Annō; Storyboard revisions by: Owen Sullivan & Melchior Zwyer	October 4, 2013	117	1.10
In Republic City, tensions between Southern and Northern Water Tribe people rise as a Southern Water Tribe cultural center is bombed. Mako, back in the police force, tries to track down the culprits while Varrick produces anti-Northern propaganda "movers" (motion pictures) starring Bolin. Korra fails to persuade President Raiko to send troops in support of the Southern rebellion. A conflicted Mako reveals Korra's plan to suborn General Iroh to commit the United Forces to the war to Raiko. Korra sets off on a sea voyage to the Fire Nation to seek the Fire Lord's support, but is pursued by Eska and Desna, and eventually swallowed by a gargantuan dark spirit.
18	6	"The Sting"	Ian Graham	Joshua Hamilton	Hyun Joo Song, Elsa Garagarza, Jay Oliva, Bobby Rubio, Sean Song, Dean Kelly, Johane Matte, Natasha Wicke & Ethan Spaulding	October 11, 2013	118	1.95
Mako and Asami investigate the theft of a shipment of Future Industries mecha-tanks bound for the Southern rebels, and enlist the Triple Threat Triads for a sting operation. They are double-crossed and find Asami's warehouses looted. In desperation, Asami sells a controlling share of Future Industries to Varrick before Mako identifies him as the instigator of the various bombings and thefts, though he lacks the evidence to convince his superiors. An amnesiac Korra washes ashore on a Fire Nation island.
19	7	"Beginnings"	Colin Heck	Michael Dante DiMartino	Park So Young, Kim Sung Hoon, Han Kwang Il, Lee Dae Woo, Bae Ki Yong & Myoung Ga Young; Storyboard revisions by: Owen Sullivan & Melchior Zwyer	October 18, 2013	119	1.73
20	8	"Beginnings"	Ian Graham	Tim Hedrick	Park So Young, Kim Sung Hoon, Han Kwang Il, Lee Dae Woo, Bae Ki Yong & Myoung Ga Young; Storyboard revisions by: Owen Sullivan & Melchior Zwyer	October 18, 2013	120	1.73
Part 1: While being healed by the Fire Sages, Korra has visions of Wan, the first Avatar, who lived 10,000 years earlier. At this time, humans lived on the shells of the giant lion turtles to protect themselves from the spirit wilds that dominate the physical world. Wan and his friends live in poverty, under the nepotistic family that rules his city. As a form of protection, the lion turtles grant the power to bend elements for a limited time when humans venture into the wilds. After Wan violates the prohibition against bringing his bending into the city to steal food for his friends, he is banished, but allowed to keep his firebending. He survives by befriending the spirits in the forest. Two years later, while exploring, he encounters two powerful spirits battling each other. One of the spirits, Vaatu, asks Wan for assistance, when he is held down by the other, Raava. When Wan separates the two, Vaatu escapes. Raava, explains that she is the spirit of light and peace, and Vaatu is the spirit of darkness and war; by inadvertently freeing Vaatu, Wan has inadvertently initiated an age of darkness for the world. Part 2: Vaatu turns other spirits dark and threatens to destroy the world. To stop Vaatu, Wan resolves to master additional elements with Raava's help, and prepare for the 'Harmonic Convergence', during which Vaatu and an increasingly weakened Raava will battle for the world's fate. Wan and Raava fail to stop a war initiated between the humans and spirits by Vaatu. At the Southern spirit portal, Wan and Raava enter the spirit world and join the battle against Vaatu by having Raava temporarily inhabit Wan. The battle goes poorly, but when the Convergence begins, Wan and Raava fuse together permanently, thereby becoming the first Avatar. After sealing Vaatu in the Tree of Time, Wan convinces the spirits to return to the spirit world and seals the portals, becoming the "bridge" between the two worlds. Years later, a dying Wan lies on a battlefield and apologizes to Raava for not bringing peace to the world. Raava says that their journey has just begun; they will have many lives together in the avatar cycle of reincarnation. Korra awakens, memories restored, and leaves the island to stop Unalaq's plans for the next Harmonic Convergence, which is weeks away.
21	9	"The Guide"	Colin Heck	Joshua Hamilton	Toshiyasu Kogawa; Storyboard revisions by: Owen Sullivan & Melchior Zwyer	November 1, 2013	121	2.47
Korra seeks Tenzin's help to enter the spirit world; but much to Tenzin's frustration, their attempts fail; Korra is instead guided by Jinora, who proves to have a strong connection to the spirits. In Republic City, Mako continues his investigation of Varrick. When Asami goes to cheer Mako up, his apartment is raided by the police and they find evidence, planted by Varrick, that he was responsible for the thefts from Future Industries, resulting in his second arrest. At the South Pole, Unalaq fails to open the sealed North Pole portal himself, and reports to Vaatu, who promises that Korra shall come to them.
22	10	"A New Spiritual Age"	Ian Graham	Tim Hedrick	Han Kwang Il, Lee Dae Woo, Kim Sung Hoon & Park So Young; Storyboard revisions by: Owen Sullivan & Melchior Zwyer	November 8, 2013	122	2.22
In the spirit world with Jinora, Korra must contend with the difficult relationships between spirits. When the two are separated, Korra is transformed into a childlike version of herself. She is rescued by Iroh, who has "retired" into the spirit world and who teaches her that she must exert strong control over her emotions in the spirit world, among other lessons, allowing Korra to travel to the Tree of Time, where the portals meet in the spirit world. Meanwhile, Jinora finds Wan Shi Tong's library and convinces the Spirit of Knowledge to allow her to learn about the spirit portals. While learning that Vaatu's seal can indeed be broken if both portals are opened during Harmonic Convergence, Jinora learns that Wan Shi Tong is in league with Unalaq. Attempting to rescue Jinora, Korra is forced by Unalaq to open the northern portal. After a short battle, Korra is rescued by a friendly spirit and forced out of the spirit world without Jinora, whose inanimate physical body remains in a coma-like state.
23	11	"Night of a Thousand Stars"	Colin Heck	Joshua Hamilton	Han Kwang Il, Lee Dae Woo, Bae Ki Yong, Park So Young, Kim Young Chan & Han Cheong Il; Storyboard revisions by: Owen Sullivan & Melchior Zwyer	November 15, 2013	123	1.87
Bolin visits Mako in prison, and Mako tries to warn his brother against Varrick. Disbelieving him, Bolin goes to the finale of his "movers" series, which President Raiko is also attending. During the performance, Bolin foils an apparent attempt to kidnap President Raiko. When he interrogates one of the kidnappers, the man incriminates Varrick, who is promptly arrested, with Mako freed. Korra warns President Raiko about Harmonic Convergence and Unalaq's plans, but President Raiko retains his army to defend Republic City. Korra turns to Varrick, who agrees to give her his personal battleship. At the South Pole, Tonraq is defeated in a grueling duel by Unalaq.
24	12	"Harmonic Convergence"	Ian Graham	Tim Hedrick	Toshiyasu Kogawa; Storyboard revisions by: Owen Sullivan & Melchior Zwyer	November 15, 2013	124	1.87
Senna tells Korra and her friends that the Southern resistance has been defeated and Tonraq captured. Meanwhile, Jinora nears death. With Harmonic Convergence hours away, Korra and her friends stage a frontal attack on the fortified South Pole, wherein everybody except Bumi is captured. Bumi infiltrates the camp and through a series of absurdities which mirror the supposed "tall tales" which he often tells, annihilates all opposition, freeing Korra and her friends. Korra and numerous of her allies follow Unalaq into the portal, while Asami takes an injured Tonraq to Katara for healing. While Tenzin, Kya, and Bumi seek Jinora, Korra goes to close the portals while Mako and Bolin hold off Unalaq, who reveals that he plans to unite with Vaatu to become a Dark Avatar and rule the world. Korra is too late to close the portal and Harmonic Convergence begins; Vaatu is freed for the first time in 10,000 years.
25	13	"Darkness Falls"	Colin Heck	Joshua Hamilton	Han Kwang Il, Lee Dae Woo, Bae Ki Yong, Park So Young, Han Cheong Il & Kim Jung Hoon; Storyboard revisions by: Owen Sullivan & Melchior Zwyer	November 22, 2013	125	2.09
Korra tries to imprison Vaatu while Mako and Bolin attempt to keep Unalaq out of the spirit world. Aided by Desna and Eska, Unalaq overpowers Mako and Bolin, ambushes Korra, and merges with Vaatu, becoming the Dark Avatar. Korra and Unalaq then battle each other in their respective Avatar States. In the Spirit World, Tenzin and his siblings meet Iroh, who indicates how to find Jinora. The siblings then venture into the Fog of Lost Souls, which drives humans mad with their self-doubts. Kya and Bumi succumb to the fog and Tenzin nearly does as well, but is visited by a vision of Aang, by whose advice Tenzin clears the fog and frees his relatives, accepted his destiny as separate from that of his father for the first time in his life. Mako and Bolin convince Eska and Desna to free them, but cannot render aid to Korra in time; Vaatu tears Raava out of Korra and Unalaq severs her connection with her past lives. Jinora senses the destruction of Raava and goes to help. Unalaq transforms into "Unavaatu", a powerful dark spirit, and departs into the physical world to destroy it and remake it in a fashion of his own choosing.
26	14	"Light in the Dark"	Ian Graham	Michael Dante DiMartino	Juno Lee, Jay Oliva, Dean Kelly, Johane Matte, Ethan Spaulding & Hyun Joo Song	November 22, 2013	126	2.09
Tenzin and his siblings find Korra and her friends wounded and unconscious. Unavaatu attacks Republic City. During the attack, Varrick escapes prison. In the Spirit World, Kya heals Korra, whom Tenzin leads to the Tree of Time, telling her to meditate within it. While meditating, Korra unlocks previously untapped spiritual potential and teleports to Republic City to discover a fragment of Raava within Vaatu; both spirits cannot exist without each other and one will always regrow from within the other. Jinora's spirit illuminates the fragment, and Korra withdraws Raava and purifies Unavaatu, killing Unalaq and defeating Vaatu. Tenzin, Kya, Bumi, Mako, Bolin, Desna and Eska defend Korra's body from attacking dark spirits. Korra and Raava return and use the Convergence to re-merge; the Avatar Spirit is reformed, but Korra's link with the previous Avatars appears to remain lost. After some contemplation, Korra decides to leave the spirit portals open, believing that spirits and humans can find a way to coexist and should be allowed the chance. She also declares the Southern Water Tribe to now be independent from the North as its own state. Korra and Mako break up, but pledge to remain friends.

== Production ==
=== Development ===
In early 2011, during the production of Book One: Air – initially conceived as a standalone 12-episode miniseries – Nickelodeon decided to order fourteen additional episodes to round out a standard 26-episode season. As of June 2012, Book Two's writing had been completed and the episodes were in the process of being storyboarded and animated. Joshua Hamilton and Tim Hedrick, writers for Avatar: The Last Airbender, contributed to the scripts of Book Two, and the season's episodes were directed by Colin Heck and Ian Graham.

=== Cast ===
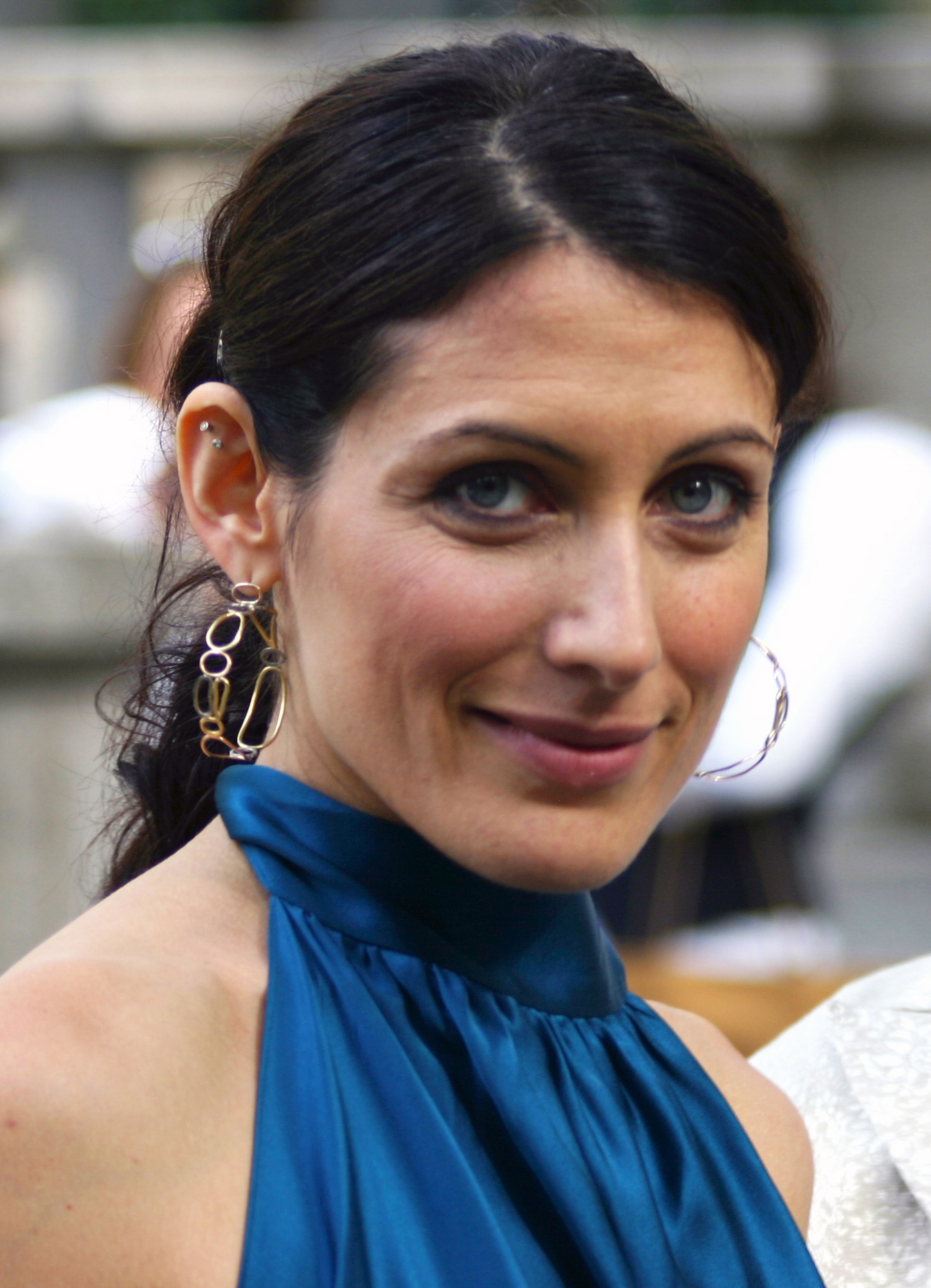
Lisa Edelstein (Kya)

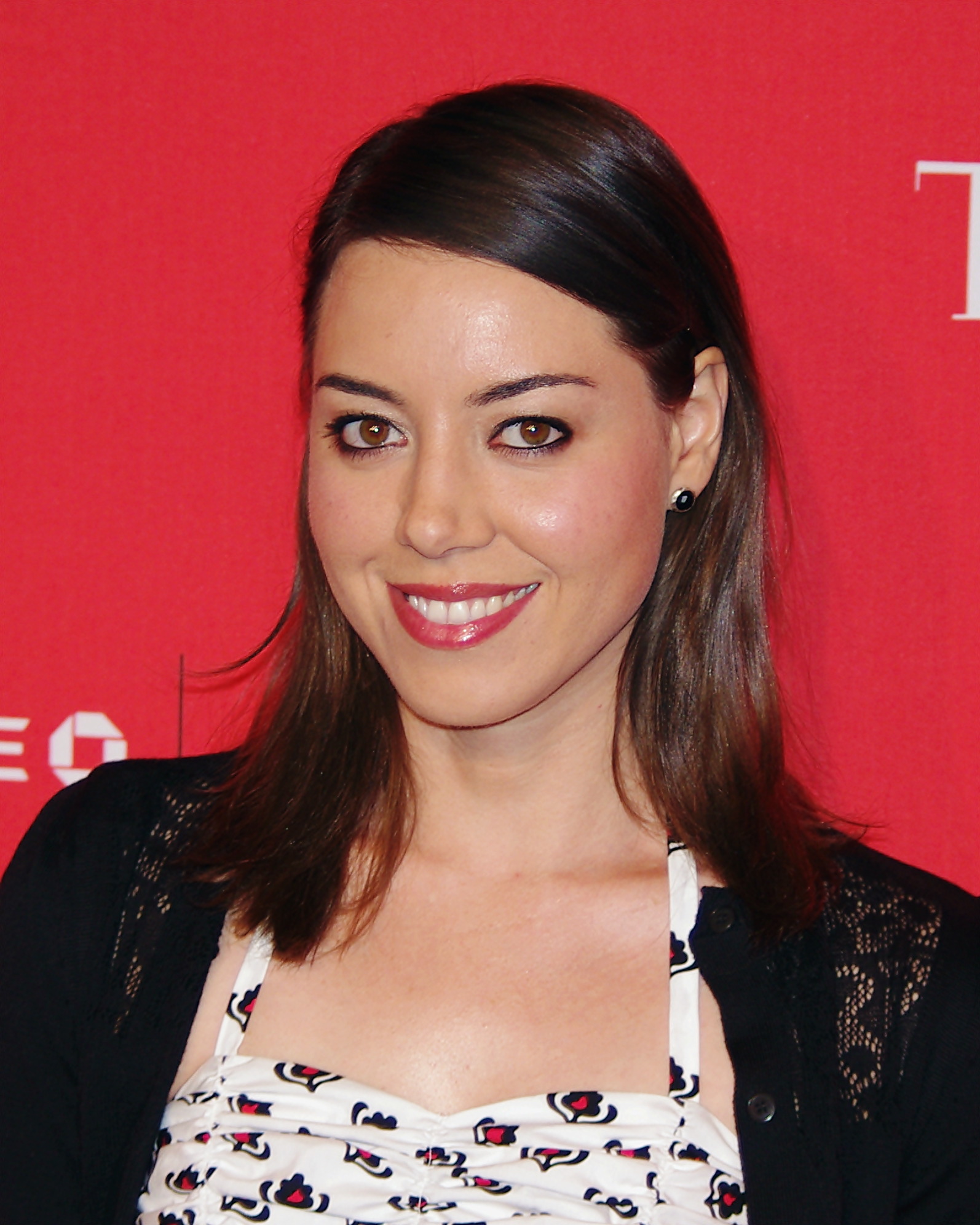
Aubrey Plaza (Eska)

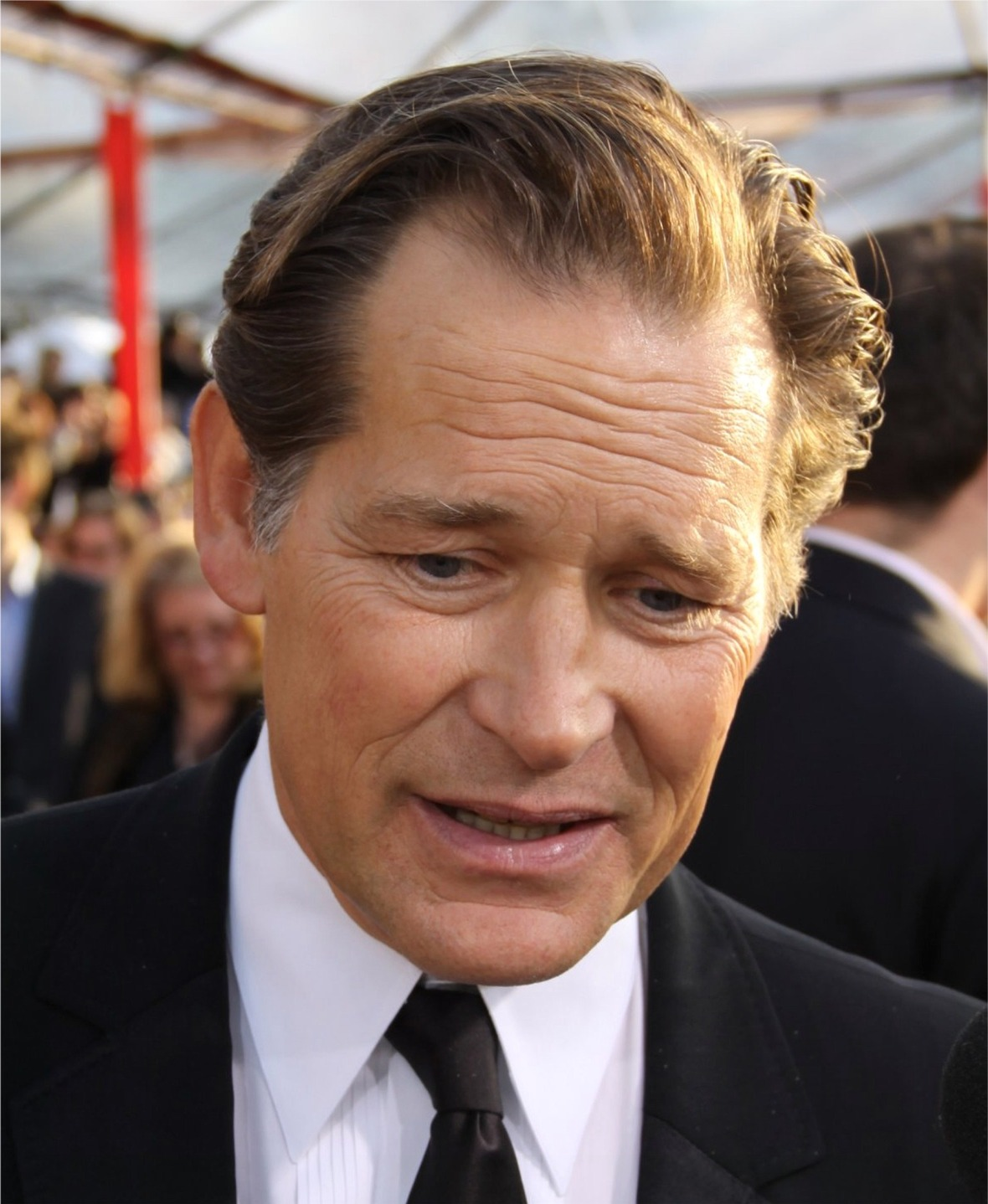
James Remar (Tonraq)

Voice actors added to the cast for Book Two: Spirits include:

- Lisa Edelstein as Kya, Tenzin's elder sister, a waterbender, and the only daughter of Aang and Katara.
- John Michael Higgins as Varrick, an eccentric businessman
- Adrian LaTourelle as Unalaq, Korra's paternal uncle, Tonraq's younger brother, Senna's brother-in-law, Desna and Eska's father and chief of both Water Tribes who serves as the main antagonist of Book Two along with Vaatu
- Aaron Himelstein as Desna, Korra's cousin
- Aubrey Plaza as Eska, Desna's fraternal twin sister and Korra's other cousin.
- James Remar as Tonraq, Korra's father and de facto leader of the Southern Water Tribe. Remar replaces Carlos Alazraqui, who voiced Tonraq in "Welcome to Republic City".
- Alex McKenna as Senna, Korra's mother. McKenna reprises her role from "Welcome to Republic City".
- Richard Riehle as Bumi, Tenzin's older brother, and the eldest child of Aang and Katara. He is a non-bender as he does not have any bending abilities.
- Steven Yeun as Wan; a young man who lived ten thousand years ago, and became the first Avatar by fusing with Raava, the spirit of light.
- April Stewart as Raava, the spiritual embodiment of light and peace. After permanently fusing with Wan, she was transformed into the divine Avatar Spirit.
- Jonathan Adams as Vaatu, the main antagonist of Book Two, and the spirit of darkness and chaos.
- Stephanie Sheh as Zhu Li, Varrick's assistant.
- Greg Baldwin as Iroh, an ally of Aang from the original series, who is revealed to have lived in the Spirit World ever since his physical body's death forty years before the start of the series.
- Amy Gross as Ginger, an actress who stars in Varrick's movers who constantly rejects Bolin's advances on her.
- Spencer Garrett as Raiko, the president of Republic City who was elected following Amon's attack on Republic City in the first book.
- Héctor Elizondo as Wan Shi Tong, the owl spirit of knowledge from the previous series who believes Unalaq to be a true friend of the spirits. Elizondo reprises his role from Avatar: The Last Airbender.
- Jason Isaacs as Zhao, the former Admiral of the Fire Nation Navy that encountered Aang on multiple occasions in the first series. He encounters Aang's children in the Fog of Lost Souls, where he is forced to wander for eternity while going insane, his punishment for killing the moon spirit. Isaacs reprised his role after starring in Avatar: The Last Airbender.

=== Animation ===
After Studio Mir, which worked on the series' first season, initially declined to work on Book Two: Spirits, it was set to be completely animated by Japanese animation studio Pierrot. However, Mir's animation director Yoo Jae-myung said that because of problems with this arrangement, the series's producers asked Studio Mir to help step in and animate Book 2 as well, an offer they accepted to preserve their studio's reputation. He said that Studio Mir initially chose to focus on animating the less challenging The Boondocks rather than the second season of The Legend of Korra because of the exhaustion brought about by their work on the first season. Pierrot eventually animated episodes 1 through 6 and episode 9, while Studio Mir was responsible for episodes 7, 8, and 10 through 14.

== Release ==
=== Broadcast ===
Book Two began broadcast on Nickelodeon in the U.S. on September 13, 2013, after a 1-year hiatus. Airing on Fridays, it initially premiered at 7:00 PM EST but then shifted in mid-October to an 8:00 PM timeslot. Episodes 11 and 12 were shown on November 15, 2013. The Book Two Finale, episodes 13 and 14, were to be broadcast on November 22, 2013, but became available online on November 16, 2013. It was followed by Book Three: Changes, which consisted of thirteen episodes.

=== Marketing ===
Completed footage from Book Two was first made public in a June 2013 promotional video, in which Korra fights spirit creatures in an Arctic setting. The premiere episode was shown in full at The Legend of Korra panel at San Diego Comic-Con on 19 July 2013, together with the release of a trailer video for Book Two.

== Reception ==
Book Two, overall, received mixed-to-positive reviews from critics, with review aggregator Rotten Tomatoes calculating a 64% approval rating for the season from 11 reviews and an average rating of 8.40/10.

The premiere episode screened in advance at Comic-Con was positively reviewed by Max Nicholson of IGN, who appreciated the setup of the overarching conflict and the humorous writing. He also stated that "the animation in Book Two has taken yet another step up in quality, with noticeable advances in the action sequences and color treatment". At TV.com, Noel Kirkpatrick commented favorably on how the episode handled the necessary quantity of exposition, and on its introduction of the theme of conflict between spiritualism and secularism. Writing for Vulture, Matt Patches highlighted the loose, handheld-style cinematography – challenging for an animated series – and the "weird, wonderful", wildly imagined spirits fought by Korra; "a Kaiju parade with beasts that mirror velociraptors". The A.V. Club's Emily Guendelsberger stated that they kept up the first season's plot's "breakneck pace" and appeared intent on signaling a break with the convention of avoiding death in children's entertainment, by showing a spirit dragging a sailor to his likely death in the sea. She appreciated the nuanced portrayal of Korra's and Mako's relationship and Korra's character flaws, but remarked that Unalaq was being set up as the season's antagonist a bit too obviously.

Parts 1 and 2 of the medial episode, "Beginnings", were positively received by critics as well. Max Nicholson of IGN rated the episode 9.6/10 and praised "Beginnings" for its "stunning" animation, "top-notch" voice acting, character origins of Avatar Wan, the friendship and heartfelt relationship between Wan and Raava, "great" new insights in the Avatar universe, and as a "masterstroke in storytelling and worldbuilding." At the end of his review, he opined that "Book 2 has never looked so good.". "The Sting", which premiered before "Beginnings", was equally praised by Nicholson for the improvement of the characterizations of Mako and Asami and their chemistry between each other, in addition to establishing Varrick as a "greedy mastermind" rather than as an eccentric businessman and entertainer as he had been before. For "The Guide", Nicholson praised the character growths of Tenzin and the fleshed-out characterization of Jinora. He lauded the episode "A New Spiritual Age" for a "great character narrative" for Korra and the establishment of Unalaq as a more of a corrupt, twisted, and menacing villain. He was also surprised to see the return of Iroh of Avatar: The Last Airbender; this time, to help Korra with her journey in the spirit world. Parts 1 and 2 of "Civil Wars" were equally acclaimed by Nicholson for the friendship between Bolin and Varrick, the sibling dynamic of Tenzin, Kya, and Bumi, a "strong, complex conflict" for Korra, the respective relationship of Tenzin, Kya, and Bumi, and Korra, Tonraq, and Senna as the heart of the story, and the twist behind Tonraq's banishment from the Northern Water Tribe and his imprisonment. According to him, "Night of a Thousand Stars" brought out the best of Bolin and the worst of Varrick, as well as setting up the conflict for the last three episodes of Book 2. For "Harmonic Convergence", Nicholson praised its spectacular action sequences, fleshing out more on Unalaq's intriguing evil purpose, the heroism of Bumi, and the animation.
