= Adolf Bohlin =

Swedish missionary

Adolf Fredrik Persson - Bohlin
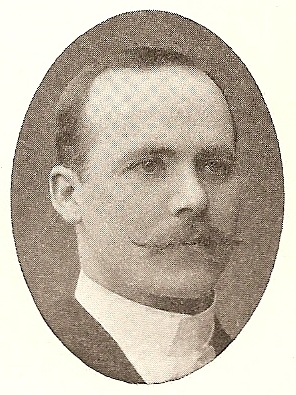
- Missionary to East Turkestan
- Born: 9 March 1873; Tived, Skaraborg County, Sweden
- Died: 27 November 1964; Los Angeles, California, US
- Parent(s): Per Erik Carlsson and Maja Cajsa Jacobsdotter

Adolf Bohlin (born 9 March 1873) was a Swedish missionary. He served with the Mission Union of Sweden in Chinese Turkestan (present day Xinjiang). Born Adolf Fredrik Persson in Tived, Skaraborg, Sweden, he was the ninth child of 12 for Per Erik Persson and Maja Cajsa Jacobsdotter. In late 1920 he moved to Los Angeles, California in the United States where he worked as a gardener until his retirement.

== Bibliography ==
- J. Lundahl (editor), På obanade stigar: Tjugofem år i Ost-Turkestan. Stockholm, Svenska Missionsförbundet Förlag, 1917
