= Korra =

Title character of The Legend of Korra

- The Legend of Korra character
- Korra as she appears in Book One of The Legend of Korra
- First appearance: "Welcome to Republic City" (2012)
- Created by: Michael Dante DiMartino; Bryan Konietzko
- Designed by: Michael Dante DiMartino; Bryan Konietzko
- Voiced by: Janet Varney (2012–2022); Cora Baker (young; The Legend of Korra); Cia Court (Seven Havens); Jacqueline Grace Lopez (2023–present)
- Incarnation(s): Pavi and Nisha (immediate successors); Aang (immediate predecessor); Roku (preceding Aang); Kyoshi (preceding Roku); Kuruk (preceding Kyoshi); Yangchen (preceding Kuruk); Szeto (preceding Yangchen); Xian (past Avatar); Sonam (past Avatar); Wan (the original Avatar)

In-universe information
- Species: Human (Bonded with Raava, the Light Spirit)
- Gender: Female
- Titles: The Avatar; Preceded by: Aang; Succeeded by: Pavi and Nisha
- Occupation: Avatar: Mediator of balance, harmony, peace, order, and reconciliation; Bridge between spirit and material world
- Fighting style: Cage Fighting Free Form-style; Pro-Bending Tournament Rules Water-style; Island Temple Aikido-style; Southern Temple Bagua-style; Southern Tribe Yang-style; Northern Tribe Yin-style; Metal Clan Beifong-style; Chu Gar Praying Mantis-style; Southern Dancing Dragon-style; Fire Nation Long Fist-style; White Lotus Form-Intention Fist-style
- Weapon: The elements; glider staff
- Family: Tonraq (father); Senna (mother)
- Spouse: Asami Sato (wife)
- Significant others: Mako (ex-boyfriend; Book One and Two)
- Relatives: Unalaq (uncle; deceased); Eska (cousin); Desna (cousin)
- Nationality: Southern Water Tribe
- Animal guide: Naga
- Bending element: Primary: Waterbending (native); Earthbending; Firebending; Airbending; Energybending; Sub-styles: Healing; Metalbending; Spiritbending
- Age: 17 in Book One; 18 in Book Two & Book Three; 21 in Book Four & comics
- Hair color: Dark brown
- Eye color: Cyan

Avatar Korra (柯拉, 寇拉; Kēlā, Kòulā) is the title lead character in Nickelodeon's animated television series The Legend of Korra, the sequel to Avatar: The Last Airbender. She is the successor and reincarnation of Avatar Aang, the lead character from The Last Airbender. As the Avatar—master of all four elements—Korra is responsible for maintaining peace and harmony in the world and defending it from both human and spiritual threats. The character was created by Michael Dante DiMartino and Bryan Konietzko and was primarily voiced by Janet Varney. Cora Baker voiced her as a child in The Legend of Korra, and Cia Court voices the character in the sequel series Avatar: Seven Havens, which follows Korra's successors as the Avatar: twin sisters Pavi and Nisha.

Korra debuted in the first episode of The Legend of Korra, "Welcome to Republic City", originally airing on Nickelodeon on April 14, 2012. At the start of the series, she met Bolin and Mako after arriving in Republic City, where she first experiences independence after living a secluded life of training, led by the Order of the White Lotus. The series' final scene, indicating the beginning of a romantic relationship between Korra and Asami Sato, was unprecedented in its LGBTQ representation in western children's television.

== Appearances ==
=== The Legend of Korra television series ===
After the death of Aang, Korra is born among the Southern Water Tribe, her bending abilities over Water, Earth and Fire manifesting by age 4.

==== Book One: Air ====
In Book One: Air, Korra, now seventeen, and having mastered three of the elements, needs to learn airbending from the only living airbending master: Aang's son, Tenzin. Korra moves to Republic City to go after him following a brief encounter with Katara, being taken in by Tenzin and meeting both Mako and Bolin before joining their pro-bending team. After saving Bolin and having her first sighting of Amon, Korra's romantic struggles lead to difficulty with the pro-bending team, which the group recovers from to successfully win their match and make it to the finals, where they are defeated and Amon strikes with his group of followers, the Equalists. Korra afterward discovers Hiroshi Sato's ties to the Equalists, then allowing Asami Sato, Bolin and Mako to live with her, forming a team with the group that Councilman Tarrlok breaks up by arresting the others and revealing himself as a bloodbender in an encounter with Korra where he subdues her. She is locked in a secluded cabin that holds her for a short time before she breaks out once it is ambushed by Amon and his Equalists, the group launching an assault on Republic City that Korra and the others are overpowered in, forcing them to retreat until General Iroh and the United Forces come to the city as reinforcements, who are also overwhelmed. Following saving Tenzin and his children and seemingly losing her bending of three of the elements to Amon, Korra engages in a battle with Amon where she emerges victorious thanks to her newly acquired airbending, having the other elements restored by Aang and in doing so gaining the power to restore bending as well.

==== Book Two: Spirits ====
In Book Two: Spirits, taking place six months after the Anti-bending Revolution, Korra learns from her uncle Unalaq of her seclusion being set by both Tenzin and her father, causing her to break off with Tenzin and have Unalaq become her mentor. During her training, Korra has to mend fences between both factions of the Water Tribe and after learning that her father had nothing to do with an attempted kidnapping of Unalaq, she participates in freeing him. Her actions prompt a civil war between the Southern and Northern Water Tribes, Korra afterward making a move to have General Iroh's assistance without President Raiko's authority, which Mako reveals to Raiko. Korra loses consciousness after an attack by her cousins Desna and Eska and a dark spirit swallowing her. She was left without her memory, learning the origins of Wan, the first Avatar, and entering the Spirit World to prevent Vaatu's escape with the aid of Jinora. After the two are separated, Korra reverts to her child self and meets Iroh, then meets her again before opening the Northern spirit portal per Unalaq's request in exchange for Jinora's soul not being destroyed by him. Korra escapes but is unable to bring Jinora with her, returning to the physical world where she makes plans to counter Unalaq, engaging him in battle where she is not only bested, but has her connections to her past lives disconnected with the destruction of the Light Spirit. In another confrontation not long after, Korra destroys Unalaq by purifying him, ending the Civil War and ushering the coexistence of humans and spirits.

==== Book Three: Change ====
Two weeks later, marking the beginning of Book Three: Change, Korra leaves Republic City to offer training to new airbenders across the Earth Kingdom after further straining her relations with President Raiko, recruiting Kai and freeing airbenders whom Earth Queen Hou-Ting had been training underground to join her army. She traveled to Zaofu next, meeting Suyin Beifong, who taught her metalbending, nearly being kidnapped after, by Zaheer, Ghazan, P'Li and Ming-Hua though she is saved by her allies. With it being discovered Aiwei was part of the conspiracy to kidnap her, Korra sets out to find him, staking out his room and entering the Spirit World after him, where she learns Zaheer and his followers are part of the Red Lotus from the latter. Though managing to escape the Red Lotus, she is captured by Earth Kingdom soldiers, the Earth Queen having declared Korra an enemy. Korra and Asami succeed in escaping, but Korra is forced to give herself up so Zaheer will not harm the captive airbenders. Zaheer double-crosses Korra, taking her unconscious body with him, poisoning her with mercury so she can enter the Avatar State and be killed in it to end the Avatar Cycle. She breaks free and is able to combat Zaheer while battling the poison, though she succumbs to it before Suyin attempts to bend it out of her. Korra is left in a fragile emotional state and unable to walk.

==== Book Four: Balance ====
In the final season, Book Four: Balance, Korra returns to the Southern Water Tribe to recuperate under Katara's care, regaining her ability to walk but losing her ability to enter the Avatar State. She then travels the world for the next three years though is haunted by a spirit of herself, even losing to it in battle. With the help of Toph Beifong, she removes the remaining mercury from her body and reconnects with the world. Initially planning to reach a peace agreement with Kuvira, Korra duels her and loses her advantage when being haunted once more, being saved by Jinora and Opal. She is then reunited with Asami and Mako when they as a group of three are successful in recovering a kidnapped Prince Wu, though Korra soon begins doubting her effectiveness as Avatar prior to Asami and Tenzin encouraging her. Korra has a reunion with Zaheer who aids her in rescuing trapped souls in the Spirit World, preparing afterward for a showdown with Kuvira by requesting the aid of spirits in the conflict and tries to interrogate Baatar Jr., Kuvira's fiancé, nearly being killed when the Future Industries factory is destroyed by Kuvira. After convincing Kuvira to surrender following showing sympathy with her motivations, she begins a romantic relationship with Asami.

=== The Legend of Korra comic series ===
==== Turf Wars ====
Korra appears in Turf Wars, the first of several graphic novel trilogies that serve as a continuation of the animated series. Following Kuvira's defeat, Korra and Asami spend time in the Spirit World exploring their romantic feelings for each other. The pair then travel to the Southern Water Tribe to reveal their relationship to Korra's parents. Upon returning to Republic City, Korra and her friends attempt to stop tycoon Wongyong Keum's plans to form an amusement park around the city's newly-created spirit portal, and face off against the Triple Threat Triad and its new leader, Tokuga, who is attempting to seize power following the devastation caused by Kuvira.

==== Ruins of the Empire ====
In Ruins of the Empire, Korra and her friends attend the trial of Kuvira, who pleads not guilty to her charges. Korra, Asami, Mako, and Bolin later travel to Gaoling with Earth King Wu to oversee the first democratic election of state governors in the Earth Kingdom, as part of Wu's efforts to reform the nation. When the election is disrupted by Commander Guan, a former subordinate of Kuvira who refused to surrender and is hoping to re-establish the Earth Empire, Korra and her friends reluctantly enlist the help of an imprisoned Kuvira to stop Guan.

=== Avatar: Seven Havens ===
Set 225 years after The Legend of Korra, the series follows Avatar Pavi and her twin sister, Avatar Nisha, the successors and reincarnations of Korra. The two are born into a world that has been decimated by an event known as the "Cataclysm", widely believed to have been caused by Korra prior to her death. As a result, the Avatar has been villainized and is seen as humanity's destroyer rather than its savior, while the remnants of humanity have organized themselves into the Seven Havens, isolated cities that serve as the last hubs of civilization.

==== Book One: Survival ====
Korra's spirit appearing before Pavi in the Book One finale.

During an exploration mission to try and dig up information on their parents, Pavi and Nisha make contact with dormant spirit energy, leading them to experience a vision of Korra causing the Cataclysm by entering the Avatar State and seemingly destroying Republic City. Later, after dissipating an energy dome created by misused spirit energy, Pavi enters a spiritual realm, where she witnesses the memories of several past Avatars before Korra's spirit appears in the form of a constellation. With Pavi having unlocked her Root Chakra by facing her fear of being recognized as the Avatar and accepting her role, Korra shows her a glimpse of the Floating Isles, indicating the next stop in Pavi's journey. Pavi asks if the haven is in trouble, but Korra only frowns in response and vanishes.

== In other media ==
Korra is featured in The Legend of Korra video game, which takes place in between the second and third seasons of the series. She has her bending abilities taken away from her at the beginning of the game and she has to regain them as it progresses. She is the only The Legend of Korra character, besides Naga and Jinora, to make an appearance in the game's story mode, which earned it criticism.

In March 2015, Bryan Konietzko posted artwork of Korra and Asami embracing, entitled Turtle-duck Date Night. The art was announced to be sold as an exclusive print for The Legend of Korra / Avatar: The Last Airbender Tribute Exhibition at Gallery Nucleus with its proceeds donated by Konietzko to an LGBTQ suicide prevention hotline. After same-sex marriage was declared legal in all 50 states of the U.S., Konietzko posted a rainbow version of the artwork. Korra and her predecessor Aang were featured on a print available for attendees of the 2015 San Diego Comic-Con.

Korra appears in The Legend of Korra books Revolution and Endgame, two novels that together adapt the first season of the series. Korra is also a playable character in Super Brawl Universe, a playable character in Nickelodeon Kart Racers 2: Grand Prix and 3: Slime Speedway, and a skin for Skadi in Smite. She also appeared as a playable character in Nickelodeon All-Star Brawl and its sequel. She was added to Fortnite Battle Royale in 2024.

Korra appears in the epilogue of RE:Anime fan film Avatar: The Last Airbender: Agni Kai in a silent cameo appearance, portrayed by Katrina Rosita, partially adapting the events of "Sozin's Comet" with the difference of Katara accidentally killing Azula, as explained to Korra by an older Katara.

== Creation and conception ==
Bryan Konietzko's interest in martial arts influenced him to draw inspirations from various female MMA fighters for the design of Korra's character, one inspiration being Gina Carano. In addition, she was indirectly inspired by one of Bryan Konietzko's sisters. Korra was also designed to be an inversion of Aang, the title character of the preceding story Avatar: The Last Airbender. Instead of the young, spiritual Aang, Korra is a more physical character who has trouble grasping the spiritual side of being the Avatar while being able to already bend three elements at the age of four. In contrast, Aang takes a while to master each of the elements, but connects with the spirit world instantaneously. Korra's name was settled long after her character was imagined. Konietzko and DiMartino could not agree to a name for her until they learned "Cora", the name of a hotel operator's dog. The name was kept, and only changed in spelling.

The creators felt the second season was built around Korra becoming more in-tuned with her spiritual side, reinforcing their belief that a giant spirit version of herself would be the "ultimate manifestation". DiMartino wrote that Korra's lack of usage of the Avatar State during the third season was purposefully done to show her connection with Raava as being full-fledged, her developed understanding that type of power should be reserved for the "most extreme circumstances."

Along with Asami Sato, Korra is half of the first major acknowledged LGBT couple in western children's animation. Regarding Korra's sexuality, Konietzko admitted that the idea of a romantic relationship between Korra and Asami had been discussed by the creators during production of season one, but had not been given much weight due to assumptions that the show would not be permitted to openly depict a same-sex relationship. As development of the last two seasons went on and Korra and Asami's friendship progressed, "the more the idea of a romance between them organically blossomed for [the creators]," and so the show started hinting at the possibility of such a relationship. In the end, Konietzko and DiMartino chose to openly depict Korra and Asami's relationship in the series finale because they didn't want to regret not doing so after the series ended. While still having limits on what could be shown, Nickelodeon was supportive of the relationship when approached.

=== Design ===
Korra as she appears in Book 4.

Before drawing the character, Konietzko and DiMartino discussed her athleticism and physicality which factored into the earliest illustrations of Korra. It took the pair and Joaquim Dos Santos's combined efforts to finalize her character design. In the pilot (2012) episode "Welcome to Republic City", Korra is introduced as a teenager wearing Fire Nation attire over her traditional Water Tribe garb. She is briefly seen wearing it again during a flashback in the fourth season. Konietzko thought it was "fun to play with" the familiar Water Tribe outfit. After her defeat of Amon, she underwent an outfit change, gaining an asymmetrical top and sleeves.

Korra for the first three seasons is depicted with long hair that is usually kept in a ponytail, though she has it down on several occasions such as when attending festivities, during her final battle with Unalaq, while entering the Avatar State after being poisoned by the Red Lotus, and during her final battle with Zaheer shortly afterward. Korra is so rarely seen with her hair down that DiMartino wrote that whenever the character had her hair down, "you know something bad has happened." She maintains the hairstyle for the next three years as she recovers until shortly after regaining her mobility, at which point she cuts it. The hairstyle change was revealed in September 2014 by Konietzko, who wrote that the character was returning to her roots by sporting a bob cut similar to the one she was given by Dos Santos in his original concept for her, Konietzko adding that the alteration was carrying on a tradition in the Avatar franchise to have hairstyle changes over the course of a series. Korra's initial clothing in the fourth season is purposely designed to mirror that of her Water Tribe attire in the previous seasons, consisting of a sleeveless shirt and baggy pants, DiMartino finding it paramount that it resemble her prior clothing due to the duration for which she wore it. Korra gains another outfit midway through the fourth season. This outfit's boots are based on an existing pair of faux suede flat winter buckle boots.

=== Voice ===
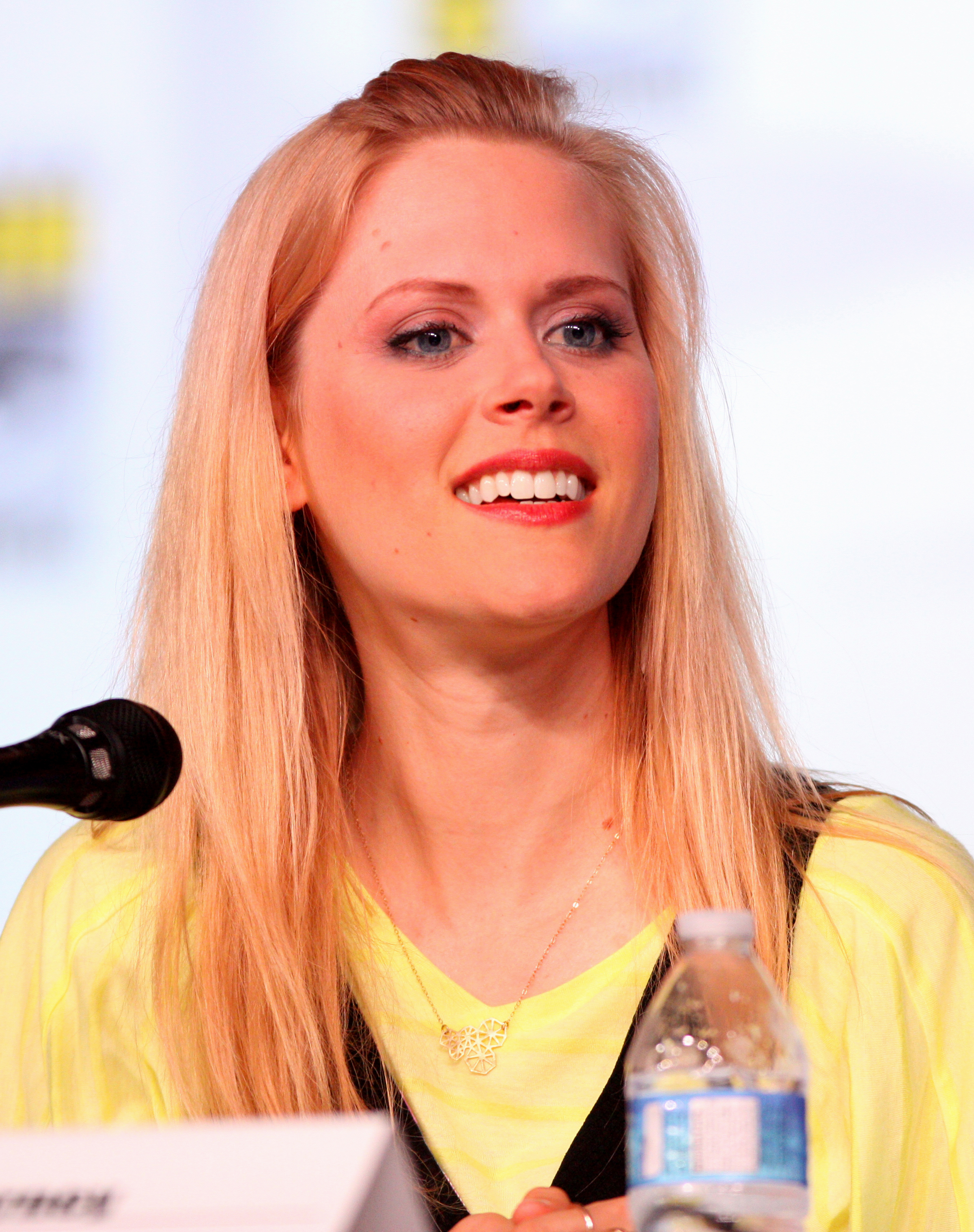
Korra's original actress, Janet Varney, at San Diego Comic-Con 2012.

Janet Varney was the original voice actress for Korra during the show's run. Varney stated that she loved the character, describing her as being "complicated" while reasoning that this was due to her age and responsibilities, and summarized her experience voicing Korra as having been "such a privilege to be a part of". Varney understood the criticism of her character and felt it was one of the compelling aspects of the series, as Korra was someone that "you're not always looking up to" and mentioned Superman while saying that a character is more interesting to her when they are flawed. Responding to being questioned about negative reception for the series in general, Varney admitted to preferring to live in a world of "unicorns and rainbows" and only pay attention to the positive feedback she received since she believed she would not "do a better job on the show if my feelings are crushed by someone who's just angry at me for no reason." Friends with Grey DeLisle, who voiced Azula in the original series, Varney remembered her advice about the fandom where DeLisle told her to be ready for her "life to change."

During a panel at MCM London Comic Con with Zuko's voice actor, Dante Basco in 2022, amidst racial tensions in the United States, Varney, who is caucasian, confirmed that she will no longer be reprising Korra in the future after a decade of voicing the character in the years since the show's conclusion and expressed hope that a woman of color would assume the role. Basco then supported Varney's decision to step down from voicing her. The actress's final time voicing Korra was in the racing title, Nickelodeon Kart Racers 3: Slime Speedway that fall. She would be subsequently voiced by Jacqueline Grace Lopez in Nickelodeon All-Star Brawl 2 the following year. In the sequel series Seven Havens, Cia Court voices an older Korra through flashbacks.

== Characterization ==
=== Personality and characteristics ===
Unlike her predecessor Aang, Korra is described by her creators as "very tough, very headstrong, and not scared to get into a fight." Her stubborn and hot-headed personality detracts from her talents, preventing her from easily learning airbending or connecting with the Spirit World. The Avatar traditionally has the greatest difficulty mastering the element diametrically opposed to the Avatar's personality. For instance, Avatar Roku—a firebender—took longer to learn waterbending and Aang—an airbender—took longer to learn earthbending. The waterbender Korra, on the other hand, had little difficulty with firebending and earthbending but had considerable trouble with airbending, a situation noted to be spiritual and not elemental.

Her best friend and animal guide is a polar bear-dog named Naga, whose strength helps Korra out of many dangerous situations. Although wild polar bear dogs were originally feared and hunted by Water Tribes, Korra is the first person to ever tame one. Korra is good friends with her pro-bending teammates, the brothers Mako (her romantic interest in seasons 1 and 2) and Bolin. She also develops a strong friendship, and later romance, with Asami Sato, a wealthy industrialist. Korra has strong relationships with the family of her previous life: Having learned waterbending from Katara and then airbending from Tenzin, Tenzin's children Jinora, Ikki, and Meelo look up to her as an older sister, and Kya and Bumi regard her as a friend. Korra is generally on good terms with her own parents, but has little contact with her uncle or cousins, whom she considers weird (and her father considers dangerous). Korra is unusual amongst her past lives in that she is technically royalty: her father Tonraq was in line to be the chief of the Northern Water Tribe before being banished and relocating to the South.

Korra's character develops and matures during episodes 11 through 12 of the first season when she is confronted with detachment from her main three bending skills, leaving her only with airbending, which she had unlocked to save Mako from Amon. Later, she connects to her spiritual self through Aang. Once the connection to her Avatar predecessors is established, Aang is able to bestow energybending upon Korra (as well as her main three bending skills lost earlier). Although Korra is able to bend all four elements, while being capable of entering the Avatar State, Korra is still in the process of perfecting her airbending skills as well as having a true connection and understanding of her spiritual self to complete her training as a fully realized Avatar. Combined with the events of seasons 2 and 3 placing her in life and death situations, the former having her no longer able to contact her past lives for advice, Korra begins to suffer post-traumatic stress by the events of Book Four: Balance while doubting her abilities as the Avatar to maintain balance after those she faced have each disrupted the order she was struggling to protect in massive ways. But ultimately, once able to let go of the pain she went through and realizing the significance to her past suffering, Korra returns to her usual self while becoming a more kind, mature, compassionate, levelheaded, thoughtful and intelligent (and a bit more sarcastic) person from her ordeals.

=== Martial arts mastery ===
"I can't believe your sweet-tempered father was reincarnated into that girl. She's tough as nails."

— Lin Beifong (The Legend of Korra)

Korra has impeccable athleticism and acrobatics, shown being capable of simultaneously lifting Tenzin and his children with relative ease. She has surprising speed that go along with her agility and reflexes, which make her a skilled combatant in and of themselves. Her physical strength and stamina makes her capable of swimming across large bodies of water for days, or lift and throw significantly larger opponents. She can punch with enough force to break iron pipes or shatter large chunks of ice launched at her. Her dexterity and balance allows her to skillfully dodge a large barrage of projectiles and easily leap across long distances and over high obstacles from a stationary position. She is shown to be quite flexible, able to bend and twist effectively enough to attack from various angles or squeeze through tight spaces.

The series' creators consulted a professional martial artist in the design of the show's fighting system. Under the White Lotus' watchful protection, Korra was educated in all known academic fields, and trained by the best martial arts instructors. She was a fast-learner and considerable prodigy, seemingly driven. Eventually, she sought out training from Aang's original teachers—Katara, Zuko, and Toph—but had great difficulty under the mentorship of Aang's son, Tenzin. Her predecessor lived with personal grief over the genocide of his people, and his personal failure as The Avatar in his inability to prevent the century long world war that destroyed millions of lives. He had vowed "never-again" would he allow himself to be unprepared in his subsequent live(s), and Korra unconsciously channels this oath in her insatiable quest to master every known martial arts that exists in her world, including:

- Mixed martial arts
- Jeet Kune Do
- Aikido
- Baguazhang
- Yang-style tai chi
- Yin-style baguazhang
- Hung Ga
- Southern Praying Mantis
- Southern Dragon kung fu
- Changquan
- Xingyiquan
- Wing Chun

=== Bending the elements ===
Korra firebending.

As the Avatar, Korra is capable of bending all four elements (air, water, earth and fire). Even as a young child, she was already a child prodigy, able to bend them with ease since and displayed a level of proficiency that would have rivaled her predecessor, Avatar Aang. At the start of the series, Korra is proficient in water, earth and fire, but struggles with airbending due to the difficulties of embracing her spiritual side. She utilizes all elements equally, but favors each one for different strategies: airbending mostly for crowd control and non-lethal purposes, such as gliding and evasive manoeuvres; waterbending for both defensive and offensive manoeuvres; earthbending for strong attacks; firebending for raw "all-in" aggression. She learned metalbending, being the first metalbending Avatar. She also tends to use firebending when she is angered or acts with hostility towards an opponent, as she demonstrated when threatening the Red Lotus when expressing outrage to Zaheer for attempting to murder her father.

Energybending

After learning energybending thanks to Aang's spirit, she becomes capable of restoring bending to those who had blocked their abilities. Her duties as Avatar and her personal feelings towards people did come into play with the restoring power, as she did not grant bending abilities back to individuals with backgrounds in crime. During Harmonic Convergence she was able to use energybending to connect with her inner spirit and gain cosmic energy from the universe to project her giant spirit.

Spirituality

As the Avatar, Korra is as a bridge between "Material World" and the "Spirit World", the plane of existence where the universe's disembodied spirits dwell. As her training under Tenzin progressed, she had slowly reconnected with her spirituality, seeing visions and accessing various memories from her past lives. Korra is able to purify "dark spirits" by balancing the energy within them. She learned to enter the Spirit World through the guidance of Jinora, her spiritual guide. Due to some residual traces of mercury in her body and mental pain after Zaheer poisoned her, Korra temporarily lost the ability to contact Raava and was unable to enter the Spirit World for three years, but regained these spiritual powers in the last season.

The Avatar State

As her predecessors, her most powerful ability is the Avatar State, in which she receives a massive boost in raw power from the cosmic energy, enabling her to easily overcome any opponent that tries to fight her head on. In the series it was revealed the Avatar State, and the Avatar itself, were created after the spirit of light Raava and the firebender Wan merged forever. In addition, this state allows her to access bending techniques she would not have learned during her own lifetime but throughout that of her past lives. If she is killed in this state, then this would cause the Avatar to cease being reincarnated. After the events of second season, Korra's Avatar State isn't able to access to the knowledge of her predecessors since she lost her connection to them indefinitely. However, she can communicate with Raava directly instead, something her predecessors were generally unable to do.

== Reception ==
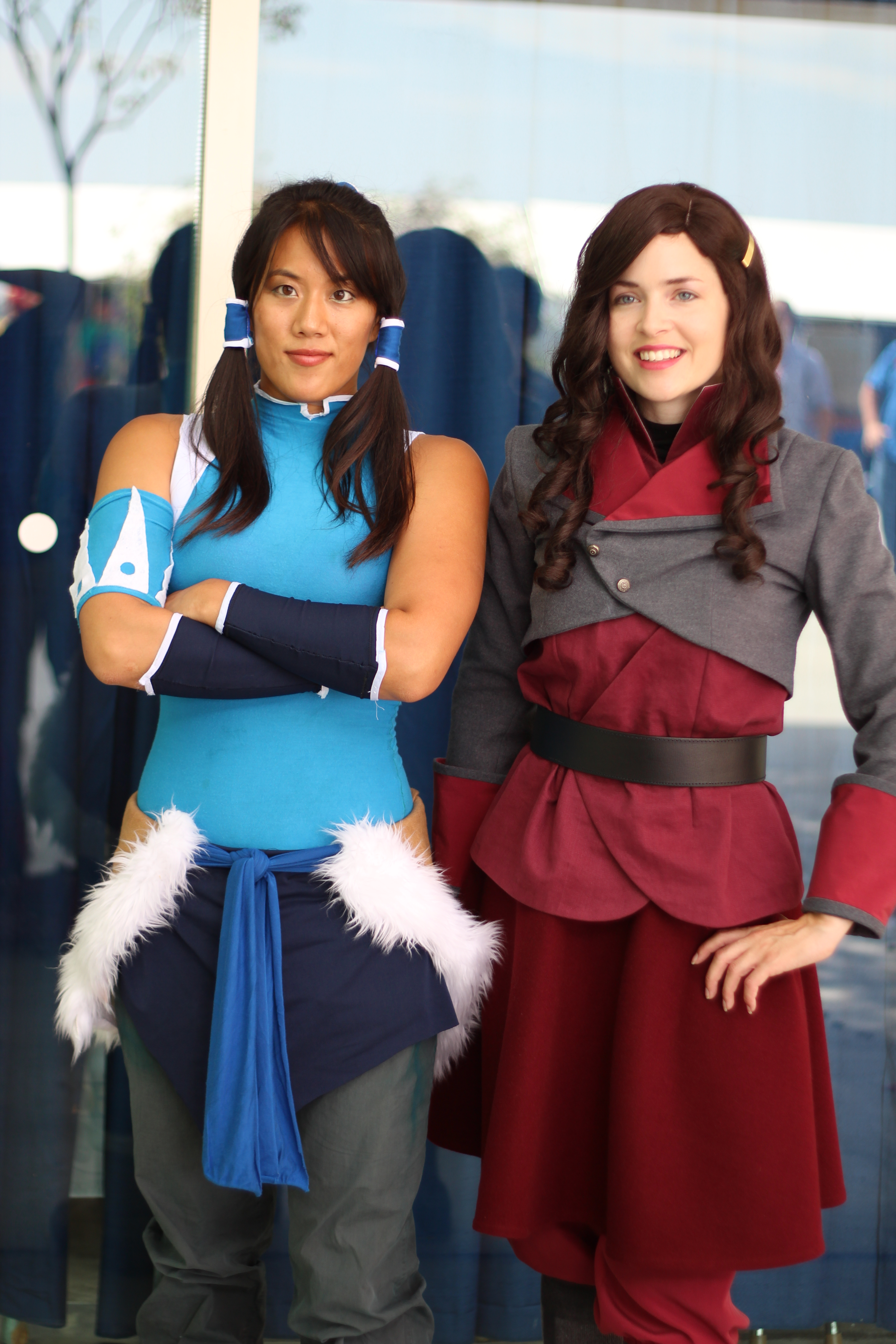
Cosplayers as Korra and Asami at San Diego Comic Con 2012.

Korra has been widely praised as a realistic, well-developed and sophisticated character by critics and viewers alike. Her position as a female protagonist, unusual for American animation, caused Nickelodeon to originally suspend production on the series. According to co-creator Bryan Koniezko, this was because the executives believed that "girls will watch shows about boys, but boys won't watch shows about girls". Production resumed though when Korra performed well during test screenings, with young boys saying they "didn't care that Korra was a girl," only that "she was awesome."

Common Sense Media praised Korra as a good role model, citing her dedication to her goals and open-mindedness towards new ideas.

Noel Kirkpatrick felt the character had become unlikeable during the second season, though applauded the show for putting her at the center of its narrative as we saw the character "without a moderating influence, like Tenzin".

Korra's experience with post traumatic stress disorder during Book Four has been highly praised as a realistic approach to the subject. Max Nicholson of IGN wrote that it was "heartbreaking" to see Korra following her battle with Zaheer "in such a vulnerable, weakened state." Janet Varney's acting received particular praise, with The A.V. Club describing it as "an exceptional performance that fully captures the Avatar's pain, fear, and sadness. [Varney's] voice work is essential to bringing a sense of reality to Korra's struggle".

Following the conclusion of the series, Zach Blumenfeld of Paste ranked Korra as the second-best character from the Avatar universe, concluding that Korra was more interesting, relatable and inspiring than her predecessor, Avatar Aang. Screen Rant ranked Korra #8 on its "30 Best Animated TV Characters Of All Time" list.

=== Relationship with Asami Sato ===
The series' final shot, showing Korra (right) and Asami as a romantic couple, was seen as pushing the boundaries of LGBTQ representation in children's television.

Korra's position as a bisexual protagonist, as well as her eventual relationship with Asami Sato have been the subject of many very positive reviews from the media. In light of the finale, Vanity Fair called the show "one of the most powerful, subversive shows of 2014", saying that the show "challenged expectations and bravely explored content outside the scope of children's television". IGN commended the action-packed and emotional finale, noting that ending was one that "fans will be talking about for a long time". Forbes predicted that, in the future, Korra holding Asami's hand and leaping into the Spirit World "will become one of the hallmarks of this series". Megan Farokhmanesh of Polygon wrote that by portraying Korra and Asami as bisexual, the series even avoided the error of assuming sexual orientation, as many other TV series did, to be a strict divide between "gay" and "straight". Reviewers have noted that the two characters complement each other well as a couple, with Korra's brashness balancing Asami's levelheadedness.

Korra and Asami's relationship has also been noted for being a "landmark moment for American and family animation." The Advocate included Korra and Asami in their 2017 list of "35 LGBT Characters Who Redefined Family TV", noting that the series "ended on a note that changed family television forever." In 2018, io9 ranked the series finale's reveal of Korra and Asami's relationship #55 on its list of "The 100 Most Important Pop Culture Moments of the Last 10 Years".

Among the critics who viewed the pairing negatively, Daniel Rodrigues-Martin of Geeks Under Grace argued that the pairing was a detriment to the characters and the story, opining that there was no foreshadowing of a romantic relationship between the two characters until the series' final moments.

In response to criticism that Korra and Asami's relationship was thrown in to appeal to fans who "shipped" the two of them together, Konietzko pointed out that any decision they made regarding Korra's romantic life could be interpreted as caving to a specific group of fans who supported Korra being paired with a certain character, and claimed that at the end of the day, the creators went for the relationship that felt right to them. He also suggested that anyone who felt the relationship was not adequately foreshadowed had watched the last two seasons only expecting to see heterosexual relationships.

== Family tree ==
Water Tribe–Air Nomad family trees

Hakoda's father	Kanna	Pakku
Hakoda	Kya	Avatar Cycle (Note: Aang and Korra are both parts of Avatar Cycle of reincarnation, with Korra immediately following Aang.)
Sokka	Katara	Avatar Aang	Korra's grandparents
Bumi	Kya	Pema	Tenzin	Senna	Tonraq	Unalaq	Malina
Jinora	Ikki	Meelo	Rohan	Avatar Korra	Desna	Eska

Color key:
Color	Description
	Water Tribe and Waterbenders
	Air Nomads, Air Acolytes, and Airbenders
