= BFF =

BFF may refer to:

== Computing ==
- "Backend for Frontend" pattern, a client-oriented design of web and mobile API in frontend and backend development
- Backup-file Format, a data archive format used by IBM AIX

== Film ==
- Belfast Film Festival, an annual film festival in Belfast, Northern Ireland, United Kingdom
- BFF: Best Friends Forever, a 2009 Filipino comedy film
- Bicycle Film Festival, a festival to celebrate the bicycle through music, art, and film
- Birrarangga Film Festival, a biennial Australian film festival focusing on indigenous filmmakers from around the world
- Boston Film Festival, an annual film festival in Boston, Massachusetts, United States
- Brooklyn Film Festival, an annual film festival in New York City

== Music ==
- Ben Folds Five, an American rock band
- "BFF", a song by Kesha from the album High Road (2020)
- "BFF", a song by Slayyyter featuring Ayesha Erotica from the mixtape Slayyyter (2018)

== Sport ==
- Bangladesh Football Federation, the governing body of football in Bangladesh
- Basque Football Federation, the governing body of football in the Basque Country

== Transport ==
- Blaenau Ffestiniog railway station (National Rail station code), near Gwynedd, Wales
- Western Nebraska Regional Airport (IATA code), near Scottsbluff, Nebraska, United States

== Other uses ==
- Best friends forever, a close friendship
- Batten Fighters Forever, British charity
- Bofi language (ISO 639-3 language code: bff)

== See also ==
- Best friends forever (disambiguation)
- BF2 (disambiguation)
- BFFs, a 2014 American comedy film
- "BFFs" (The Cleveland Show), a 2011 episode of The Cleveland Show
- BIFF (disambiguation), includes several film festivals
