= List of Ben 10 characters =

List of characters in the Ben 10 franchise

This is a list of characters in the universe of the Cartoon Network's Ben 10 franchise.

== Overview ==
=== Television series ===
- This table shows the recurring characters and the actors who have portrayed them throughout the franchise.
- A dark grey cell indicates the character was not in the series or film, or that the character's presence in the series or film has not yet been announced.
- A ^{Y} indicates an appearance as a younger version of a pre-existing character.
- A ^{C} indicates a cameo appearance.
- A ^{P} indicates an appearance in onscreen photographs only.
- A ^{D} indicates an appearance in deleted scenes only.
- A ^{M} indicates a motion-capture role.
- A ^{U} indicates an uncredited role.

= Main cast
= Recurring cast
= Guest cast

| Characters | Ben 10 (2005) | Ben 10: Alien Force | Ben 10: Ultimate Alien | Ben 10: Omniverse | Ben 10 (2016) |
| Characters | 2005–2008 | 2008–2010 | 2010–2012 | 2012–2014 | 2016–2021 |
| Characters | Team Tennyson | | | | |
|---|---|---|---|---|---|
| Benjamin "Ben" Kirby Tennyson Ben 10 | Tara Strong | Yuri Lowenthal | Yuri Lowenthal | Yuri Lowenthal | Tara Strong |
| Benjamin "Ben" Kirby Tennyson Ben 10 | Tara Strong | Yuri Lowenthal | Tara Strong^{Y}^{C} | Tara Strong^{Y} | Yuri Lowenthal^{C} |
| Gwendolyn "Gwen" Tennyson Lucky Girl | Meagan Smith | Ashley Johnson | Ashley Johnson | Ashley Johnson | Montserrat Hernandez |
| Magister Maxwell "Max" Tennyson Grandpa Max | Paul Eiding | Paul Eiding | Paul Eiding | Paul Eiding | David Kaye |
| Kevin Ethan Levin Kevin 11 | Michael Reisz | Greg Cipes | Greg Cipes | Greg Cipes | Greg Cipes |
| Kevin Ethan Levin Kevin 11 | Charlie Schlatter | Greg Cipes | Greg Cipes | Greg Cipes | Greg Cipes |
| Rook Blonko | | | | Bumper Robinson | |
Secondary characters
| Azmuth | Robert David Hall | Jeff Bennett | Jeff Bennett | René Auberjonois | David Kaye |
| Julie Yamamoto | | Vyvan Pham | Vyvan Pham | Vyvan Pham | |
| Professor Paradox | | David McCallum | David McCallum | David McCallum | |
| Kai Green | Bettina Bush | | | Bettina Bush | |
Antagonists
| Vilgax | Steve Blum | James Remar | James Remar | Steve Blum | Yuri Lowenthal |
| Doctor Aloysius Animo | Dwight Schultz | Dwight Schultz | Dwight Schultz | Dwight Schultz | Dwight Schultz |
| Hex | Khary Payton | Khary Payton | Khary Payton | Khary Payton | Robin Downes |
| Hex | Kari Wahlgren | Khary Payton | Khary Payton | Khary Payton | Robin Downes |
| Charmcaster | Kari Wahlgren | Kari Wahlgren | Kari Wahlgren | Kari Wahlgren | Tara Strong |
| Zombozo | John Kassir | | John DiMaggio | John DiMaggio | John DiMaggio |
| Acid Breath | Dee Bradley Baker | | | Dee Bradley Baker | Josh Keaton |
| Thumbskull | Jeff Doucette | | | David Kaye | John DiMaggio |
| Frightwig | Cree Summer | | | Cree Summer | Jessica DiCicco |
| Zs'Skayr | Steve Blum | Jeff Bennett | | Steve Blum | |
| Albedo | | Yuri Lowenthal (Note: Voiced by Tara Strong as a child) | Yuri Lowenthal | Yuri Lowenthal | |
| Albedo | | | Yuri Lowenthal (Note: As a Galvan) | Eric Bauza | |
| Mike Morningstar Darkstar | | Wil Wheaton | Wil Wheaton | Wil Wheaton | Yuri Lowenthal |
| Mike Morningstar Darkstar | | | | | Drake Bell |

=== Film series ===
- This table shows the recurring characters and the actors who have portrayed them throughout the franchise.
- A dark grey cell indicates the character was not in the series or film, or that the character's presence in the series or film has not yet been announced.
- A ^{Y} indicates an appearance as a younger version of a pre-existing character.
- A ^{C} indicates a cameo appearance.
- A ^{P} indicates an appearance in onscreen photographs only.
- A ^{D} indicates an appearance in deleted scenes only.
- A ^{M} indicates a motion-capture role.
- A ^{U} indicates an uncredited role.

| Characters | Film series | | | | | Special |
| Characters | Ben 10: Secret of the Omnitrix | Ben 10: Race Against Time | Ben 10: Alien Swarm | Ben 10: Destroy All Aliens | Ben 10 Versus the Universe: The Movie | Ben 10/Generator Rex: Heroes United |
| Characters | 2007 | | 2009 | 2012 | 2020 | 2011 |
| Characters | Team Tennyson | | | | | |
|---|---|---|---|---|---|---|
| Benjamin "Ben" Kirby Tennyson Ben 10 | Tara Strong | Graham Phillips | Ryan Kelley | Tara Strong | Tara Strong | Yuri Lowenthal |
| Gwendolyn "Gwen" Tennyson Lucky Girl | Meagan Smith | Haley Ramm | Galadriel Stineman | Meagan Smith | Montserrat Hernandez | Silent cameo |
| Magister Maxwell "Max" Tennyson Grandpa Max | Paul Eiding | Lee Majors | Barry Corbin | Paul Eiding | David Kaye | Silent cameo |
| Kevin Ethan Levin Kevin 11 | | | Nathan Keyes | | Greg Cipes | Silent cameo |
| Rex Salazar | | | | | | Daryl Sabara |

== Main characters ==
=== Ben Tennyson ===
Voiced by:

- Tara Strong – Ben 10 (2005), Ben 10: Ultimate Alien, Ben 10: Omniverse & Ben 10 (2016) (child)
- Yuri Lowenthal – Ben 10: Alien Force, Ben 10: Ultimate Alien, Ben 10: Omniverse & Ben 10 (2016) (teenager)

Portrayed by:

- Graham Phillips – Ben 10: Race Against Time
- Ryan Kelley – Ben 10: Alien Swarm

Ben Tennyson is the titular character and the main protagonist of the franchise. At the start of Ben 10, he is a 10-year-old boy (Note: 15 in Alien Force and 16 in Ultimate Alien and Omniverse) from Bellwood who, during his summer vacation, discovers the Omnitrix, a prototype device that attaches to his wrist and allows him to transform into various aliens. He uses the prototype Omnitrix to become a hero while traveling across the USA. After the prototype Omnitrix is self-destroyed at the end of Alien Force, Ben retrieves the Ultimatrix from Albedo and uses it as a replacement. At the end of Ultimate Alien, Azmuth takes the Ultimatrix away to destroy and gives Ben the official version of the Omnitrix.

=== Gwen Tennyson ===
Voiced by:

- Meagan Smith – Ben 10 (2005)
- Ashley Johnson – Ben 10: Alien Force, Ben 10: Ultimate Alien, & Ben 10: Omniverse
- Montserrat Hernandez – Ben 10 (2016)

Portrayed by:

- Haley Ramm – Ben 10: Race Against Time
- Galadriel Stineman – Ben 10: Alien Swarm

Gwen Tennyson is Ben's paternal cousin. In the original series, Gwen shared a love-hate family relationship with Ben. Before discovering and reinventing her dormant magic powers, she helped Ben using her innate intelligence; she is also a talented martial artist who has received black belts in karate and taekwondo. Gwen is a model student, and in Omniverse, she is shown leaving for an Ivy League college.

Gwen is able to manipulate mystical energy named "mana" to create energy blasts, shields, and other constructs. She later learns that her powers are not magic in origin, but rather alien, and her paternal grandmother, Verdona, is a powerful Anodite alien who can manipulate mana, the essence of magic and life. Gwen later learns to take on a fully Anodite form at will.

=== Max Tennyson ===
Voiced by:

- Paul Eiding – Ben 10 (2005), Ben 10: Alien Force, Ben 10: Ultimate Alien & Ben 10: Omniverse (adult)
- Adam Wylie – Ben 10 (2005) (child)
- Jason Marsden – Ben 10: Ultimate Alien (teenager)
- David Kaye – Ben 10 (2016)

Portrayed by:

- Lee Majors – Ben 10: Race Against Time
- Barry Corbin – Ben 10: Alien Swarm

Max Tennyson is Ben and Gwen's paternal grandfather. He is 60 years old in the original series, 65 in Alien Force and the reboot, 66 in Ultimate Alien and Omniverse, 80 in Ben 10,000 and 92 in Ken 10. (Note: 60 in Ben 10, 65 in Ben 10: Alien Force and in the reboot, 66 in Ben 10: Ultimate Alien and in Ben 10: Omniverse, 80 in Ben 10,000 and 92 in Ken 10) Despite his age, he is shown to be an experienced capable fighter, and after Ben finds the Omnitrix, supports him any way he can. Max was once a candidate for the Apollo 11 mission and one of the leaders, or "Magisters", of the Plumber organization, but Ben and Gwen did not know of this at first, believing him to have been a literal plumber.

=== Kevin Levin ===
Kevin Levin (voiced by Michael Reisz in the original series episode "Kevin 11", Charlie Schlatter in later episodes of the original series, and Greg Cipes in subsequent series; portrayed by Nathan Keyes in Alien Swarm) is initially depicted as an Osmosian with the ability to absorb matter, energy, and DNA and initially appears in the original series as an 11-year-old (Note: 16 in Ben 10: Alien Force, 17 in Ben 10: Ultimate Alien (through present)) boy and one of Ben's enemies. Believing his stepfather Harvey Hackett convinced his mother to abandon him after he accidentally destroyed his family's house when his powers first manifested, Kevin ran away and ended up living in the subway of New York City, where he met Ben and used him to siphon the Omnitrix's energies to get back at those who demonized him. However, Kevin was also infused with the DNA of the aliens Ben had access to at the time and became a chimeric hybrid of the alien forms, which rendered him psychotic and unstable. Kevin managed to return to his original form after being trapped in the Null Void. In Omniverse, it is revealed that Kevin is actually a human and derived his powers from a genetic mutation.

In the reboot, Kevin is a human who wields the Antitrix, a version of the Omnitrix that allows him to transform into modified versions of Ben's aliens.

=== Rook Blonko ===
Rook Blonko (voiced by Bumper Robinson) is a Revonnahgander Plumber who Max assigns to work with Ben after Gwen and Kevin leave Bellwood for college. He is a top Plumber Academy graduate and skilled fighter who wields the Proto-tool, a shapeshifting weapon that can transform into various tools.

=== Alternate versions of Ben ===
==== Ben 23 ====
Ben 23 (voiced by Tara Strong) is an alternate universe Ben from Dimension 23 debuting in "Store 23". This version is a celebrity, using the Omnitrix to become famous, and lacking the morals of Ben Prime due to the death of his universe's Max. Ben begins to change his ways after meeting the prime universe Ben.

==== Ben 10,000 ====
Ben 10,000 (voiced by Fred Tatasciore in the original series and reboot, Sean Donnellan in Ultimate Alien, Judd Nelson in Omniverse) is the future version of Ben. Ben's depiction changes between series; the original version of the character is named for his expanded roster, consisting of 10,000 aliens.

== Secondary characters ==
=== Julie Yamamoto ===
Julie Yamamoto (voiced by Vyvan Pham) is Ben's love interest in Alien Force and Ultimate Alien, and his ex-girlfriend in Omniverse.

=== Professor Paradox ===
Professor Paradox (voiced by David McCallum) is a time traveler who received government funding to work on breaking a hole in the space-time continuum during the Cold War. A miscalculation caused Paradox to get sucked into the Event Horizon, where he remained displaced from time for 100,000 years. Losing his mind and regaining his sanity, he gained a complete understanding of the space-time and renamed himself Paradox. Paradox uses the Chrononavigator to traverse space and time, which initially appears in the series as a pocket watch.

=== Kai Green ===
Kai Green (voiced by Bettina Bush) was Ben's first love interest, current girlfriend and future wife.

=== Azmuth ===
Azmuth (voiced by Robert David Hall in the original series, Jeff Bennett in Alien Force and Ultimate Alien, René Auberjonoisis in Omniverse, and David Kaye in the reboot) is an elderly Galvan who created the Omnitrix.

=== Plumbers' Helpers ===
The Plumbers' Helpers are the children of Plumbers, assembled by Ben and Max in Alien Force to help them fend off the Highbreed invasion. All of the group's members, save Cooper, are alien hybrids who were originally believed to have been conceived naturally. In Ben 10: Omniverse, the Plumbers' Helpers are retroactively established to have been human before Proctor Servantis mutated them using Kevin's abilities.

- Cooper (voiced by Cathy Cavadini in the original series, Corey Padnos in Alien Force, Chris Pratt in Ultimate Alien, Eric Bauza in Omniverse) is a mutant human with the ability to manipulate technology. Cooper was introduced in "Ben 10 vs. the Negative 10", the finale of the original series, where he assisted the Tennysons in fighting the Negative 10.
- Alan Albright (voiced by Zeno Robinson in Alien Force and Ultimate Alien, Bumper Robinson in Omniverse) is a Pyronite hybrid who can return to his human form at will, unlike the other Plumbers' Helpers.
- Helen Wheels (voiced by Juliet Landau) is a Kineceleran hybrid and friend of Manny. The two used to hunt aliens they confused for criminals whom they would throw into an old Null Void projector, which they mistook for a disintegration weapon. Manny convinces Helen that Ben, Gwen and Kevin are DNAliens, but the confusion is eventually cleared up after Ben proves that the Null Void projector was not a weapon.
- Manny Armstrong (voiced by Khary Payton) is a Tetramand hybrid and friend of Helen. The two formerly hunted aliens before realizing their wrongs and reforming. Manny is like Kevin: hot-headed, aggressive, a rebel and sometimes cocky, often willing to fight even when it may be not necessary. He shows an anti-hero personality and is stubbornly dedicated to their mission, immediately assuming that Ben, Gwen, and Kevin are DNAliens. Manny is finally convinced to listen after being brought down by Ben.
- Pierce Wheels (voiced by Adam Wylie) is a hybrid of an unidentified species and Helen's adoptive brother. He has the ability to sprout quills from anywhere on his body, which he uses in tandem with his martial art skills. Pierce re-appears in the Ultimate Alien episode "The Purge", where he is killed by the Forever Knights during their purge of alien life on Earth.

== Antagonists ==
=== Vilgax ===
Vilgax (voiced by Steve Blum in the original series and Omniverse, James Remar in Alien Force and Ultimate Alien, Yuri Lowenthal in the reboot) is a Chimera Sui Generis warlord who is Ben's first and most recurring arch-nemesis through the series. Vilgax was exiled from his home world for being ruthless, cruel, and power hungry. Soon after, Vilgax learned of the Omnitrix's existence after being attacked by George Washington and a time-traveling Ben. Vilgax became determined to have the Omnitrix and use it to build an army for his use. He is assisted by Psyphon (voiced by Dee Bradley Baker).

=== Doctor Animo ===
Doctor Aloysius Animo (voiced by Dwight Schultz) is a mad scientist specializing on the experimentation of animals, often creating mutated or hybrid creatures. He appears in every incarnation of the series.

=== Hex and Charmcaster ===
Hex (voiced by Khary Payton, Robin Atkin Downes in the reboot) and his niece and apprentice Charmcaster (voiced by Kari Wahlgren, Tara Strong in the reboot) are a pair of magical humans who have clashed with Ben and his allies often.

=== Forever Knights ===
The Forever Knights are a group of high-tech knights determined to stop alien invasions. In the reboot series, the Forever Knight is one person.

=== Zs'Skayr ===
Zs'Skayr (voiced by Steve Blum, and Jeff Bennett in Alien Force) is an Ectonurite who was trapped inside the Omnitrix, becoming the genetic sample for Ben's Ectonurite form Ghostfreak. Zs'Skayr eventually escaped and became Ben's enemy. Zs'Skayr was the High Lord of the Anur System, and was assisted by Anur System aliens such as Viktor (voiced by Michael Dorn), a Transylian who resembles Frankenstein's monster.

=== SixSix ===
SixSix is a Sotoraggian bounty hunter.

=== Albedo ===
Albedo (voiced by Yuri Lowenthal as a human teenager, and as a Galvan in Ultimate Alien, Eric Bauza as a Galvan in Omniverse, and Tara Strong as a child) is the former apprentice of Azmuth. He developed a duplicate version of the Omnitrix which turned him into an imperfect clone of Ben, with a swapped color palette.

=== Michael Morningstar/Darkstar ===
Michael "Mike" Morningstar, also known as Darkstar (voiced by Wil Wheaton, and Drake Bell and Yuri Lowenthal in the reboot) is the son of a Plumber who has energy absorption abilities, serving as a recurring villain of Ben. He briefly dated Charmcaster.

=== Zombozo and the Circus Freak Trio ===
Herbert Zomboni, known as Zombozo (voiced by John Kassir in the original series, and John DiMaggio in other appearances) is a clown themed vampire with the ability to absorb laughter and happiness. He was initially accompanied by a trio of circus-themed mutant supervillains, the Circus Freak Trio. The team consisted of Acid Breath, who can generate acid; Thumbskull, who possesses superhuman strength; and Frightwig, who possesses prehensile hair.
