= Gwen Tennyson =

Character from the Ben 10 franchise

- Ben 10 character
- Gwen Tennyson as depicted in (from left to right) Ben 10 (2005), Ben 10: Alien Force, Ben 10: Ultimate Alien, Ben 10: Omniverse, and Ben 10 (2016).
- First appearance: Original continuity version: "And Then There Were 10" (2005); As Lucky Girl: "Lucky Girl" (2006); Reboot version: "The Filth" (2016); As Lucky Girl: "Brief Career of Lucky Girl" (2016); Dynamite version: "Event Arrival, Part One" (2026)
- Last appearance: Original continuity version: "A New Dawn" (2014); Reboot version: "Alien X-Tinction" (2021)
- Created by: Joe Kelly; Joe Casey; Duncan Rouleau; Steven T. Seagle
- Voiced by: Meagan Smith (2005–2008; 2012); Ashley Johnson (2008–2014); Montserrat Hernandez (2016–2021)
- Portrayed by: Haley Ramm (Race Against Time); Galadriel Stineman (Alien Swarm)

In-universe information
- Full name: Gwendolyn Catherine Tennyson
- Aliases: Lucky Girl; Sorceress; The Witch
- Nickname: Gwen
- Species: Anodite (genetically human)
- Affiliation: Team Tennyson; Plumbers; Anodites
- Family: Frank Tennyson (father); Natalie Tennyson (mother); Ken Tennyson (older brother); Ben Tennyson (paternal cousin); Carl Tennyson (paternal uncle); Sandra Tennyson (paternal aunt-in-law); Manny Tennyson (Note: Manny was mentioned in Gwen 10, a non-canon episode. It is unknown if he exists in the canon timeline.) (paternal uncle); Max Tennyson (paternal grandfather); Verdona (paternal grandmother)
- Significant others: Kevin Levin; Michael Morningstar (formerly)
- Children: Eunice / The Unimatrix (genetic copy)
- Relatives: Gordon Tennyson (paternal granduncle); Betty Jean Tennyson (paternal grandaunt-in-law); Vera Tennyson (paternal grandaunt); Joyce (maternal grandaunt) (Note: Mentioned in What Are Little Girls Made Of?.); Ben (paternal great-great-grandfather); Jedediah Tennyson (paternal great-granduncle); Sunny (paternal cousin); Joel Tennyson (paternal first-cousin-once-removed); Camille Mann-Tennyson (paternal first-cousin-once-removed-in-law); Clyde Fife (paternal second-cousin)
- Nationality: American
- Abilities: Magic/sorcery and mysticism: Life force/chakra creation, manipulation and absorption; Spellcasting of various types of magic, sorcery and mysticism; Teleportation spells; Power augmentation spell; Elemental magic: Water; Fire; Earth; Air/Wind (Turbo spell); Aether/quintessence/mana; Nether; Light; Shadow/darkness/dark; Portal creaton; Extrasensory/psionic abilities: telepathic abilities; namely mind-reading; Dowsing; Clairvoyance; Telekinetic and levitation spells; Natural abilities: Expert martial artist; Expert acrobat; Genius level intelligence; High intuition; Natural potential to utilize supernatural artifacts

Gwendolyn "Gwen" Tennyson, occasionally known as Lucky Girl, is a fictional character that appears in Cartoon Network's Ben 10 franchise, created by Man of Action. The paternal first cousin and best friend of title protagonist Ben Tennyson, Gwen is a core member of Ben's team who frequently aids him in his various adventures to defeat villains and criminals and protect and save earth and the universe. A highly intelligent and strong martial artist, Gwen later develops magic abilities that are eventually revealed to be alien in nature, having inherited it from her alien paternal grandmother, Verdona.

Gwen was created for Ben 10 (2005–2008), in which she was voiced as a 10-year-old by Meagan Smith. Smith was replaced by Ashley Johnson, who voiced the teenage Gwen for the sequel series Ben 10: Alien Force, Ben 10: Ultimate Alien, and Ben 10: Omniverse, while Montserrat Hernandez voiced Gwen for the 2016 reboot. Tara Strong also briefly voiced a version of Gwen set in an alternate future from the original series.

== Fictional character biography ==
=== Ben 10 (2005–2008) ===
In the series, Gwen Tennyson (Meagan Smith) is sent by her parents on a road trip with her Grandpa Max and her cousin Ben. She and Ben constantly argue, however they are both shown to deeply care for each other on various occasions throughout the series. Following Ben's acquisition of the Omnitrix, the trio embark in a series of adventures, encountering various extraterrestrial and supernatural entities, including the intergalactic alien warlord overlord and conqueror Vilgax and master magician Hex and his niece Charmcaster, the latter of whom detects a "magical aura" within Gwen, which she begins tapping into, acquiring magic powers of her own and obtaining Charmcaster's spellbook. On two occasions, Gwen uses the magic artifacts known as the Charms of Bezel to become the superhero Lucky Girl while becoming powerful like her cousin Ben with his Omnitrix. Besides magic, Gwen's biggest power is her intelligence: she is a computer expert and revealed to have extensive knowledge of history and science. She is also a skilled martial arts practitioner and adept gymnast.

=== Ben 10: Alien Force (2008–2010) ===
Set five years after the end of the original series, Gwen Tennyson is now a black belt in karate, but tends to favor using her powers. She is capable of creating energy blasts and constructs for nearly any purpose and opening up interdimensional portals, which she uses to assist Ben after Max's disappearance forces him to put the Omnitrix back on. In the episode "Everybody Talks About the Weather", the pair's former enemy Kevin tells Gwen her powers and abilities originate from her "alien bloodline", which she refuses to believe. In "What Are Little Girls Made Of?", Gwen discovers this to be true, that her paternal grandmother, Verdona, is an energy being known as an Anodite; a magic-wielding race made of the magic energy mana from the planet Anodyne, and that Gwen seems to be her only human descendant to have inherited her powers. Verdona offers to take Gwen to her home planet and train her in magic, but Gwen prefers to remain on Earth with Ben and Kevin. She later comes into conflict with a returned Charmcaster and Michael Morningstar, who after initially seeking to absorb her powers, seeks revenge against her after her taking back her powers reduced him to a husk. Gwen later unleashes her true Anodite form for the first time in "War of the Worlds", succeeding defending the world from the Highbreed. During the course of the series, she develops a romantic relationship with Kevin, and is revealed to suffer from both arachnophobia and claustrophobia. Galadriel Stineman portrays Gwen in the 2009 television film Ben 10: Alien Swarm.

=== Ben 10: Ultimate Alien (2010–2012) ===
Set several weeks after the previous series, Gwen Tennyson, now sixteen years old, releases her dormant, inner Anodite for the second time against Zombozo after he attempts to kill her aunt and Ben's mother Sandra, growing to a gigantic size and shouting at him to leave Ben and Kevin's families alone, terrifying him before letting him go to spread the word to all of their other enemies. Gwen also discovers that her black-haired near-identical cousin Sunny is also an Anodite and once again encounters Charmcaster and Darkstar, who are engaged in a romantic relationship after Charmcaster failed to use Dagon to resurrect her father, before helping Ben save the universe in destroying Dagon. Ben 10/Generator Rex: Heroes United, a one-hour crossover with fellow Man of Action series Generator Rex, aired on November 25, 2011 on Cartoon Network, in which Gwen is featured towards the beginning and in a flashback in a cameo appearance.

=== Ben 10: Omniverse (2012–2014) ===
In Ben 10: Omniverse, Gwen is now sixteen years old. She attends the college Friedkin University, with one of her teachers being a reformed Hex. She is reduced to a supporting role in this series. She is often depicted in flashback sequences to when she was 11. She looks just like she did in the Original Series, except that she has freckles, she begins to experience growth spurts, and the cat logo on her shirt is now bigger. It is also revealed she had developed a crush on Kevin over the summer.

At the end of the series finale, "A New Dawn", after travelling back in time to stop Maltruant and watching the birth of the universe, Ben calls Gwen to get Kevin as he proposes that the trio and his partner Rook Blonko go on a road trip together to explore the universe that they watched being created.

=== Ben 10 (2016–2021) ===
Ben 10 introduces a re-imagined Gwen (in her 10-year-old form), her cousin Ben, and Grandpa Max, as they travel the country during summer vacation. When Ben finds the Omnitrix, a mysterious watch that transforms him into 10 different aliens, a world of extraterrestrial superpowers opens up to him; Gwen's identity of Lucky Girl from the previous continuity exists as a popular in-universe multimedia franchise of which she is a fan, while her enemy Kevin has a crush on her, to which she is oblivious.

== Concept and creation ==
The original design of Gwen from the original pilot of Ben 10 (2005).

Glen Murakami's original concepts for Gwen.

Ben 10 was created by Man of Action (consisting of comic book creators Duncan Rouleau, Joe Casey, Joe Kelly, and Steven T. Seagle) and was produced by Cartoon Network Studios. The group worked on the concept of Ben 10 and its title character roughly three years before Cartoon Network picked up the series. Dave Johnson also helped in the design development. Gwen was originally developed to be a classmate of Ben's accompanying on his road trip with his grandfather. Later in development, she was changed to be his cousin, the pair being the same age.

Gwen's original design, including a yellow t-shirt and ponytail, was inspired by the original design of Ben Tennyson, the red hair retained for all series, while the ponytail would be incorporated into her outfit redesign by Glen Murakami for the last season of Alien Force, the entirety of Ultimate Alien and the first season of Omniverse. Her head and hair were reworked by Glenn Wong, who also gave the character her blue top in Alien Force, while colors were added by Chris Hooten.

The original concept behind the characters was later cited as the primary inspiration for the characters of Patrice Blazing and Nate Timely in PopCap Games and Dark Horse Comics' Plants vs. Zombies comic series, with Patrice designed after Gwen and Nate after Ben.

== Personality ==
In the original series, Gwen is portrayed as intelligent and mature, but she is usually stubborn and quick-witted when interacting with Ben. Her quick thinking and strong instincts give her an advantage in dangerous situations.

As she grew older, she became even more mature, caring, and sympathetic. Her affection for her cousin Ben became more evident, as she had formed a deep bond with him during that adventure-filled summer, realizing how much she truly cared for him. Gwen is willing to forgive villains for their wrongdoings, most notably Kevin, if she believes they have changed for the better.

Despite being significantly more mature and reasonable than Ben and Kevin, Gwen can be somewhat hot-headed and may lose control of her abilities if provoked.

== Powers and abilities ==
Due to her Anodite heritage and having inherited "the spark", Gwen is able to manipulate mana.

=== Magic ===
In the original series, Gwen has shown a latent knack for magic, able to handle multiple magical artifacts. In the third season, after keeping the villain Charmcaster's small spellbook, Gwen begins casting spells and practicing magic. Throughout the Original Series, her abilities manifested as light blue energy, due to her being a badly trained Anodite as well her manipulating mana indirectly. Despite abandoning these tactics in favor of her Anodite powers (depicted in magenta) starting in Alien Force, she continued casting spells later on Ultimate Alien and Omniverse.

=== Mana manipulation ===
Starting in Alien Force, Gwen's abilities have progressed to a magenta-colored energy. She soon discovers her Anodite heritage and comes to learn the energy she manipulates is mana, a life force energy present in all living beings. Mana is the basis of magic, which explains Gwen's previous magical proficiency.

By manipulating mana, Gwen is able to create forcefields, energy blasts, beams, stepping stones and energy constructs. She is also able to track living beings by sensing their mana and can absorb or generate mana at will. Through her powers, she is also capable of telekinesis, teleportation, clairvoyance and healing.

=== Anodite form ===
Gwen can take on an Anodite form, where she appears in a dark purple hue with long, glowing pink and white hair. In this state, she has the ability to increase her size, fly, and attain immortality, while her powers are significantly amplified.

=== Martial arts ===
Gwen is a skilled martial artist and has been practicing since before the events of the original series. She used these skills often to help Ben prior to discovering her magical and Anodite abilities and was capable of taking on opponents much larger than herself. She is trained in Karate, Taekwondo, Jujutsu, Judo and Savate. She is also a highly skilled gymnast as she is very agile and can jump great heights and distances. She uses her acrobatic skills in combat to dodge enemy attacks, avoid obstacles or to traverse around her environment.

=== Intellect ===
Gwen is highly intelligent and graduated high school early at 16.

== Portrayal ==
=== Voice actors ===
She is voiced by Meagan Smith in the 2005 original series as 10-year old Gwen until the series finale in 2008. Smith reprises her role in the film Ben 10: Destroy All Aliens.

In the 2008 sequel series, Ben 10: Alien Force; teenage Gwen (15 years old), is voiced by Ashley Johnson (replacing Smith) and continued to voice Gwen in both Ben 10: Ultimate Alien and Ben 10: Omniverse respectively. In Omniverse, she voices both the kid and teenage versions of Gwen, as well as all her alternate timeline counterparts.

Tara Strong voices Gwen as an adult from an alternate timeline in the original series for two episodes ("Ben 10,000" and "Ken 10").

Gwen is voiced by Montserrat Hernandez in the 2016 reboot, who additionally voices both alternate variants (from the future and a universe where she had the Omnitrix instead of Ben) and all alien forms she assumes.

=== Live-action ===
Gwen is played by Haley Ramm in Ben 10: Race Against Time and by Galadriel Stineman in Ben 10: Alien Swarm.

== In popular culture ==
In the 2013–present Dark Horse Comics series Plants vs. Zombies by Paul Tobin, co-protagonist Patrice Blazing is visually based on Gwen Tennyson, with her best friend Nate Timely designed after Ben. Patrice has since also been made available as a playable character in the video game Plants vs. Zombies 3.

In the Marvel Unlimited digital comic Alligator Loki #25 (published December 2023), the Marvel Comics superhero Gwen Poole is given the color scheme of Gwen Tennyson by the issue's colorist Pete Pantazis, who, on not being given a reference image for "Gwen" and not being familiar with the character of Gwen Poole, elected as an Easter egg to give the normally blonde-haired and pink-highlighted Gwen Poole the same red-orange hair color palette as Gwen Tennyson, and making her one-piece swimsuit (drawn by Bob Quinn with the same design as-in The Unbelievable Gwenpool and It's Jeff!) the same two shades of blue as Gwen's clothing in Ben 10 and the flashback narrative of Ben 10: Omniverse, in place of Poole's usual white-and-pink look.

== See also ==
- List of Ben 10 characters
