= Best friends forever (disambiguation) =

Best friends forever describes a close social relationship.

Best friends forever may also refer to:

- Best Friends Forever (film), a 2013 American female buddy road comedy film
- Best Friends Forever (American TV series), an American sitcom television series
- Best Friends Forever (Indonesian TV series), an Indonesian teen drama mystery thriller television series
- Best Friends Forever (sculpture), a 2025 statue of Donald Trump and Jeffrey Epstein
- Best Friends Forever?, an Indian teen drama television series
- "Best Friends Forever" (South Park), an episode of the American animated television series South Park
- BFF: Best Friends Forever, a 2009 Filipino comedy film
- "Best Friends Forever", a 2001 song by Tweenies

== See also ==
- BFF (disambiguation)
