= BF2 =

BF2 may refer to:

- Battlefield 2, a video game developed by Digital Illusions CE (DICE)
- Star Wars: Battlefront II (2005 video game), a 2005 video game developed by Pandemic Studios
- Star Wars Battlefront II (2017 video game), a 2017 video game developed by EA DICE
- BF2 IAU Minor Planet Center nomenclature for small solar system bodies
  - (6008) 1990 BF2 a.k.a. 1990 BF2
  - (5489) 1992 BF2 a.k.a. 1992 BF2, see 5489 Oberkochen

== See also ==
- BFF (disambiguation)
- BF3 (disambiguation)
