= Ben Tennyson =

Fictional character from Ben 10

- Ben 10 character
- Ben Tennyson as depicted in (from left to right) Ben 10 (2005), Alien Force & Ultimate Alien, and Omniverse.
- First appearance: "And Then There Were 10" (December 27, 2005)
- Last appearance: "A New Dawn" (November 14, 2014)
- Created by: Joe Kelly; Joe Casey; Duncan Rouleau; Steven T. Seagle
- Voiced by: Tara Strong (child) (2005–2008; 2012–2014); Yuri Lowenthal (teenager) (2008–2014)
- Portrayed by: Graham Phillips (Race Against Time); Ryan Kelley (Alien Swarm)

In-universe information
- Full name: Benjamin Kirby Tennyson
- Species: Human
- Occupation: Superhero; Soccer Player
- Weapon: prototype Omnitrix (formerly); Ultimatrix (formerly); Completed Omnitrix
- Family: Carl Tennyson (father); Sandra Tennyson (mother); Max Tennyson (grandfather); Verdona (grandmother); Gwen Tennyson (cousin)
- Significant others: Julie Yamamoto (ex-girlfriend); Ester (ex-girlfriend); Kai Green (girlfriend and future wife)
- Nationality: American
- Abilities: Omnitrix allows transformation into various alien species; Skilled hand-to-hand combatant; Eidetic memory

Benjamin Kirby “Ben” Tennyson, commonly known as Ben 10, is a superhero and the titular protagonist of the Ben 10 franchise. Created by Man of Action and produced by Cartoon Network Studios, he first appeared in the animated series Ben 10 (2005-2008), following his journey through Ben 10: Alien Force (2008–2010), Ben 10: Ultimate Alien (2010–2012), Ben 10: Omniverse (2012–2014). The franchise has been rebooted twice, first in the animated series Ben 10 (2016–2021), and then in the Dynamite Comics series Ben 10 (2026), reimagining the character as a 10-year-old for a modern audience. Across these iterations, he matures from a reckless and adventurous child into a capable and responsible hero once he obtains the Omnitrix, a watch-like device which allows him to turn into various alien species. The version of Ben Tennyson presented in the first four series is identified as Ben Prime from the Prime Timeline, making him the progenitor of the entire multiverse.

Since his debut, Ben Tennyson has become one of Cartoon Network's most recognizable characters and has appeared in various media such as feature-length films, specials, comic books, video games, park attractions, books, game shows, plays, and attractions. He is voiced by Tara Strong as a child and Yuri Lowenthal as a teenager throughout the franchise, in addition to being portrayed by Graham Phillips and Ryan Kelley in their live-action versions.

== Concept and creation ==
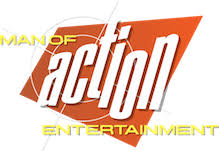
Logo of Man of Action Entertainment

In the early 2000s, Man of Action (writer collective composed of comic book creators Duncan Rouleau, Joe Casey, Joe Kelly, and Steven T. Seagle) was hired by Cartoon Network Studios to create an action animated show. They pitched twenty different ideas in twenty minutes, with each being a minute long. The eighth pitch, one about a boy named Ben 10 with the ability to change between 10 transformations, ended up being chosen. It was pitched to Cartoon Network in 2002 and during pre-production phases, the title went through several revisions, including Force 10 and Ben to the Tenth. The pitch in its earliest stages featured Ben Tennyson wielding a device known as the "Megawhat" that would transform him into alternate versions of himself around the multiverse. Around this time, the working title was Ben^{10}, before the final title was decided to be Ben 10.

Artist Steven E. Gordon designed concepts for Ben, his device (later named "the Omnitrix"), and Ben's transformations. Gordon's concepts of Ben depicted him as a redhead boy with a medium-sleeved, orange and white shirt with an orange collar. He has baggy, olive toned dark yellow pants with two large pockets. He wears white shoes with that are light blue around the bottom and grey on the top and the sole. His Omnitrix resembled an ordinary wristwatch.

Ben's final design for the 2005 series was made by Dave Johnson. The design depicts him shorter than Gordon's design, with brown hair and green eyes. Ben's clothes consisted of a black-striped, white shirt with short sleeves, military green cargo pants with side pockets with a black belt hidden under his shirt, and black and white sneakers with black stripes.

The character's middle name, Kirby, was conceived as a reference to comic book artist Jack Kirby.

Initial concepts for Ben's Alien Force and Ultimate Alien designs were made by Glen Murakami. His head and hair were reworked by Glenn Wong, who also gave him his green jacket, while colors were added by Chris Hooten.

=== Transformations ===
In Gordon's concepts, the transformations were shifted from being alternative versions of Ben to superheroes. Gordon designed concepts for the ten Omnitrix transformations. Unlike the official versions, these transformations were all still humanoid superheroes, each possessing one unique ability. These superheroes were Digger, Dragonfly, Ghostfreak, Greymatter, Inferno, PlantGuy, Razorjaws, StrongGuy, Upgrade, and XLR8. Aspects of Gordon that were retained included the names of Ghostfreak, Greymatter, Upgrade, and XLR8.

The idea of bringing in aliens was conceived by writer Greg Johnson during the original show's three-year production, though he was uncredited. Gordon updated his concepts, making his superhero concepts more alien and monster in nature. By 2005, artist Dave Johnson redesigned the transformations, following the decision to make them extraterrestrial aliens instead of superheroes. Johnson was credited with redesigning Ben and his transformations, in addition to the major supporting cast during the first two seasons of the classic series. He left the show, citing poor treatment and was replaced with Thomas Perkins. Johnson's final contribution to the franchise was designing the alien transformation Feedback for Ben 10: Omniverse years later.

Early on in development, it was decided that a villain would be within the Omnitrix. After Ghostfreak was created, dialogue was added into the first season to hint there is something more to Ghostfreak. Originally, Cannonbolt, the 11th alien transformation in the series, was intended to be in the original set of aliens but was replaced with Diamondhead. When working on test animations for the series, the first transformation to be showcased was Four Arms, and it was the most popular transformation out of all the aliens for Man of Action. Many unused designs for Upchuck were repurposed in the episode "Ben 10,000" as two of Ben's aliens, Spitter and Arctiguana, and the villain Sploot.

== Portrayal ==
=== Voice actors ===
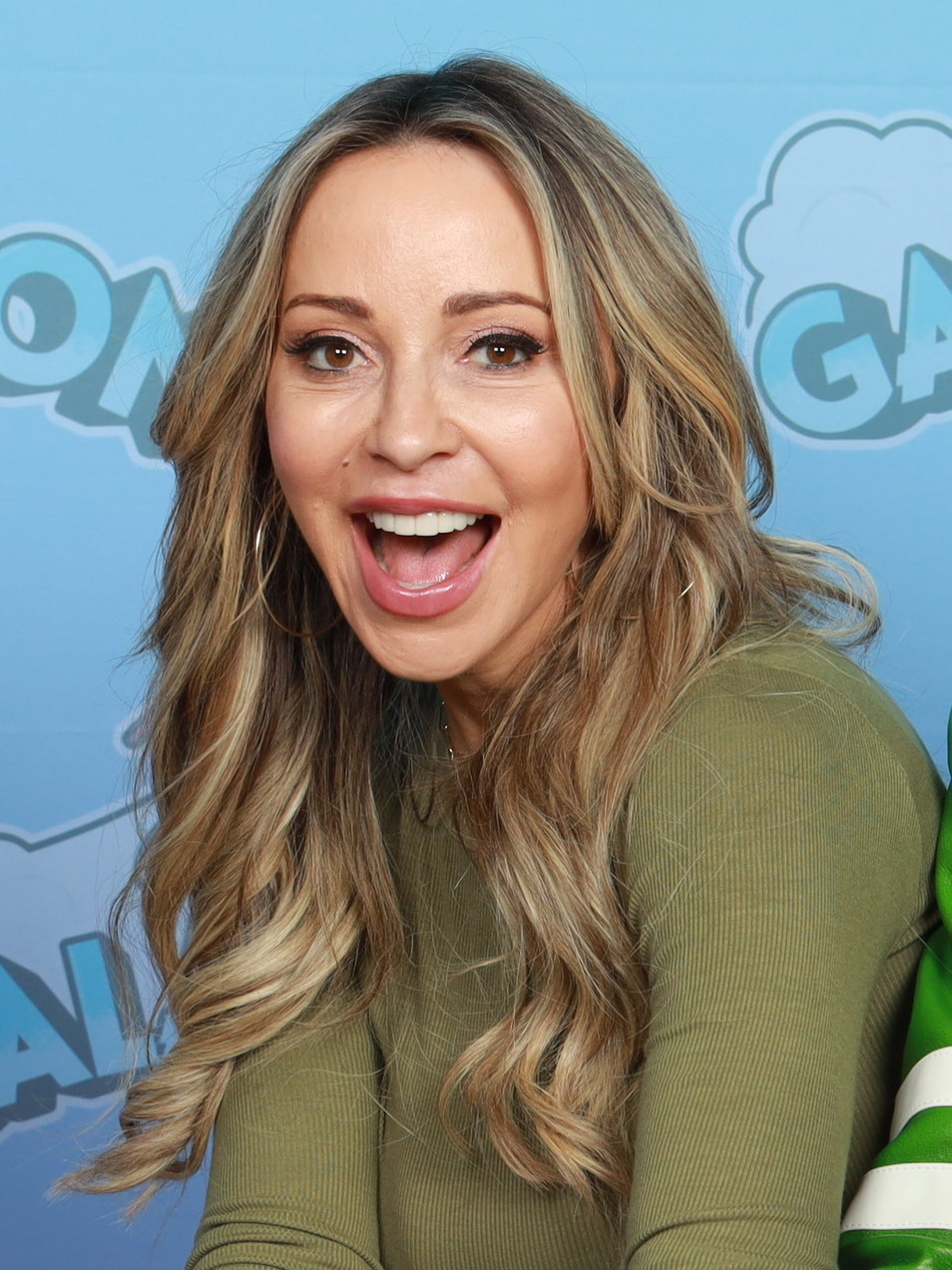
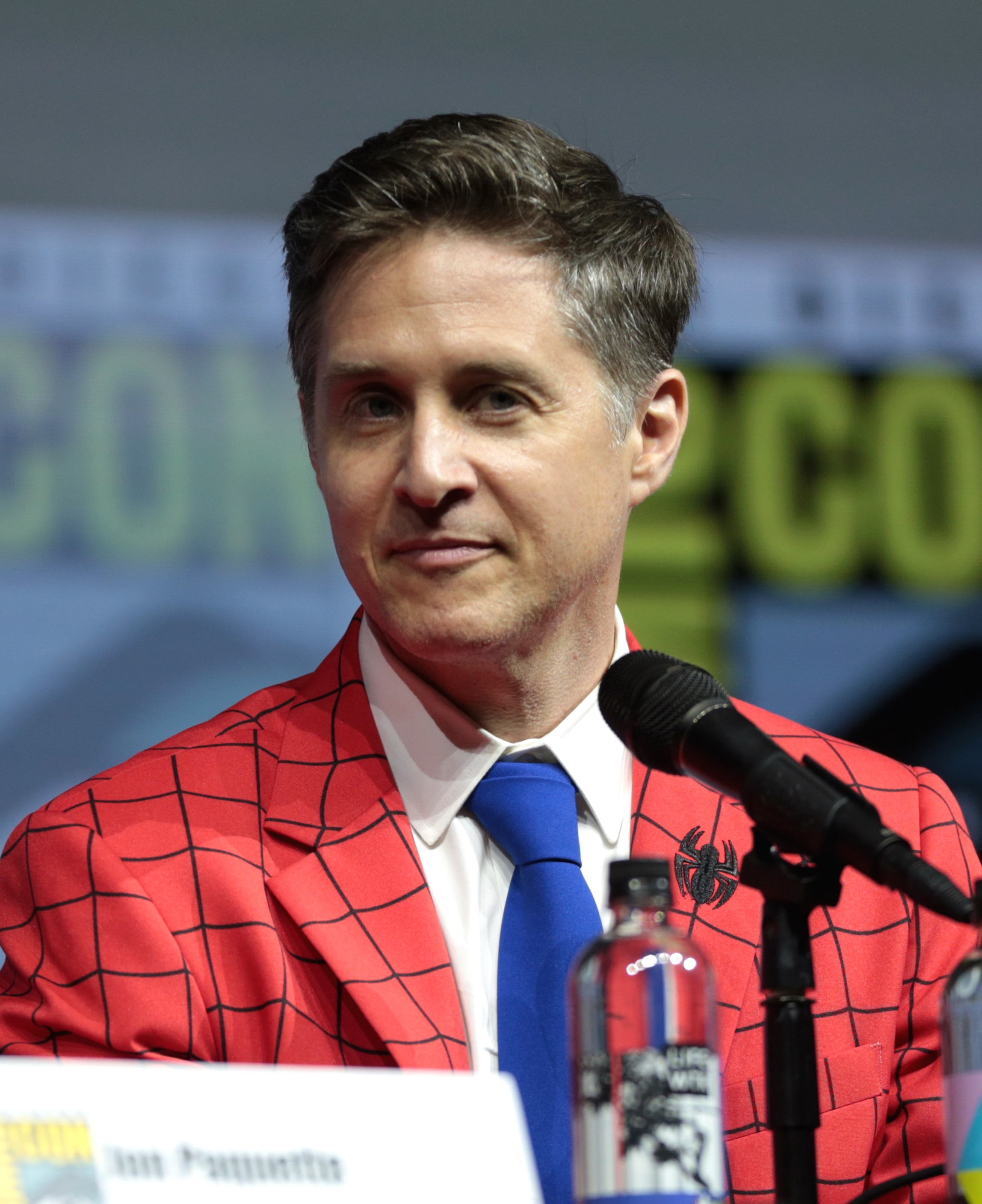
Tara Strong (left) and Yuri Lowenthal (right) have voiced Ben as a child and teenager respectively throughout the franchise.

Tara Strong first voiced 10-year-old Ben in the original 2005 series. She later reprised the role in Ultimate Alien, in the episode "The Forge of Creation" and in flashback episodes of Omniverse, with Ben at age 11. Strong also returned to voice Ben in the 2016 reboot, again portraying the character as a 10-year-old; along with voicing his original series incarnation at age 10 in "Alien X-Tinction". According to Man of Action, Strong had to re-audition for the role in the reboot; as they initially considered casting a child actor before ultimately retaining her in the role. Monsterrat Hernandez and Gunnar Sizemore, who voice Gwen Tennyson and Billy Billions in the reboot, respectively; also auditioned for the role Ben before Strong was brought back. According to Strong, the biggest adjustment she had to make in voicing Ben for the reboot was portraying him as less mean to Gwen than he had been in the 2005 series. Strong voiced 10-year-old Ben in every series to date except Ben 10: Alien Force, where he never spoke.

Yuri Lowenthal first voiced Ben at age 15 in Ben 10: Alien Force. When casting Ben for Alien Force during the audition process, Lowenthal revealed that he was called back multiple times during the audition process to read for the role before ultimately being cast. He would later reprise his role as 16-year-old Ben in Ben 10: Ultimate Alien and Ben 10: Omniverse, sharing the role in the latter with Strong, who voices the younger Ben. Both Strong and Lowenthal also voice alternate versions of Ben in Omniverse. Lowenthal returns in the 2016 reboot cameoing as an elderly Ben in the episode "The 11th Alien: Part 2", and later returns to voice the aforementioned 15 and 16-year-old counterparts of Ben in "Alien X-Tinction".

== Personality ==
"You think I don't know? When it's hero time, if I mess up, somebody could die. From what you told me, if we mess up this time, everybody could die... Maybe that's too much to have in your head when you have to win. Maybe if I pretend everything is a big joke, when the time comes, I'll be able to do what I have to do."

— 10-year-old Ben to 17-year-old Kevin asking him to be serious.

Initially cocky, childish, and selfish, Ben's immaturity and attention-seeking behavior often led him to joke around, regardless of the situation, which landed him in trouble with adults.

As a child, he often used the Omnitrix improperly in order to benefit himself instead of actually helping others. His allies often criticized his attitude, unaware of the fact that he used humor to mask his fears. It was also implied that, on some level, Ben helped people to get rewards. and for the thrill of being a hero, rather than because it was the right thing to do. Despite some childish attitude, Ben was heroic, caring and generally good-natured, always willing to save others at any time even at the risk of himself. In spite of this good nature, heroism, and his moments of maturity, Ben could occasionally get carried away when it came to fame and recognition. This led him to act rather arrogantly and recklessly, and occasionally made dire mistakes and alienated his loved ones. However, he was quick to realize his mistakes and is quick to take responsibility and knew not to take things too far.

Over the years, Ben has displayed good leadership skills, as well as the ability to adapt his attitude to a situation, becoming serious when it's called for. He became more mature, responsible and sensible. He continues to be kind-hearted and willing to lay down his own life for others. His idealistic views and unwillingness to compromise his values sometimes drive him to act against reason, such as helping his enemies if they need it. Professor Paradox has praised Ben's good nature, going so far as to say he had the gift to make the right choices at the right moments, and even Azmuth states that Ben ultimately always does the right thing. Also, Ben doesn't give up and wouldn't let anyone stop him from doing what's right for those in need, especially his family, friends and mentors, or to bring enemies down, even when he once got a broken arm.

However, even as a teen, Ben still displays some of his negative childish traits at times, which usually comes to light when Ben gets too caught up with fame much to the annoyance of Gwen and Kevin. Ben also has a violent, aggressive side: when Ben fails to save someone, is worried about the well-being his loved ones, or if people get hurt because of his failure, he becomes angry and lashes out, even at people he cares about. Ben confessed to Max that he felt guilty for letting fame get into his head and claimed that he was trying to act more mature for once.

Ben has experienced trust issues, when it comes to automatically trusting everybody and teaming up with people whose true colors are later revealed and turns against the team. Though often perceived as unintelligent because of his immaturity and constant joking, Ben is cunning and resourceful when needed, quickly adapting when the Omnitrix doesn't provide him with the alien he wanted. He has once admitted that people assume he's not paying attention, but he actually is. In Omniverse, Ben started thinking of himself as more of a superhero than a Plumber, often remarking that he's not a cop, but a superhero.

== Abilities ==
Ben is a fairly proficient fighter, even as a human. Although he mainly employs a loose street fighting style, he also knows martial arts. On top of that, he has gained practical experience from years of fighting aliens. Has also received basic Plumber training, having succeeded in the Plumbers' Academy with a 95 out of a 100.

Ben can jump very high, is acrobatic, and has parkour skills. Ben has quick reflexes, being able to dodge attacks and shots, as well as retaliate in kind. It is evident that Ben is smart in some respects, possessing an above-average to high intelligence, and has a good memory. Ben has strong willpower and often manages to turn his weaknesses into strengths.

He is skilled on hoverboards and snowboards, and is an expert pilot of cars and spaceships. He is ambidextrous and also a skilled marksman and fencer. Ben can play baseball, soccer (primarily as a goalie), and drums, and knows several electric guitar techniques, including shredding, hammer-ons, and artificial harmonics.

=== Equipment ===
At age 10, Ben became the bearer of the Prototype Omnitrix (which was later replaced by the Ultimatrix, and then by the Completed Omnitrix), an alien watch-shaped device that gives him the power to modify his own genetic code to transform into various alien creatures. Traditionally, he was only allowed to transform into ten aliens, but he later gained additional forms, either by unlocking them or by scanning the DNA of aliens he encountered. In total, Ben has access to 1,000,912 transformations, though the Omnitrix mostly allowed sets of 10 aliens at a time.

When transforming, Ben acquires all the characteristics of the creature, including its appearance, voice, and all of its unique and special abilities, powers, strengths and weaknesses. He usually retains his personality, but there are some cases where the transformation causes a change in it. Although he uses them to fight, he can also use them to impersonate them.

Among other functions, the Omnitrix includes a Universal Translator, which allows him to communicate in any language in the universe, a Genetic Repairer, which manipulates and repairs genetic data and can even bring back extinct species, and a safety system that prevents Ben from dying.

The Ultimatrix allowed him to evolve his aliens, through the "Evolutionary Function" into their so-called "Ultimate" forms. Ben also possesses an alien hoverboard, a sports car called the "Mark 10", given to him by Kevin, and the "Tenn-Speed", a motorcycle made by Jury Rigg with alien technology.

== Fictional character biography ==
=== Ben 10 (2005) ===
Ben was born in December in the city of Bellwood in the United States, the only son of Carl and Sandra. Ben begins his summer vacation with his cousin Gwen and his grandfather Max. During their first night camping in Max's RV, Ben finds an alien pod containing the prototype Omnitrix after a meteorite crashes nearby. The device latches onto his wrist, granting him the ability to transform into ten different alien life forms. With his newfound abilities, and later discovery of Max's past as part of a secret government organization called The Plumbers, Ben navigates through the responsibilities of being a hero. Throughout the summer, Ben encounters a range of villains, including Dr. Animo, Kevin Levin, and the Forever Knights, with Vilgax serving as the series' primary antagonist, alongside various other foes. Despite his immaturity and occasional use of the prototype Omnitrix for selfish purposes, Ben proves to be a worthy wielder of the device. Over the summer, Ben grows closer with his family and becomes more proficient with the prototype Omnitrix.

After discovering that the prototype Omnitrix can unlock transformations beyond the ten he initially had, Ben gains access to new alien forms, including Cannonbolt and Wildvine, ultimately unlocking nine additional transformations by the end of the series. He later loses the ability to transform into Ghostfreak after the prototype Omnitrix's Ectonurite DNA sample, which retained the consciousness of its original host, (Note: His name would be revealed as Zs'Skayr in Ben 10: Omniverse) manifests independently and escapes. In his first time-travel adventure, Ben is sent twenty years into the future, where he meets his future battle-hardened version of himself, known as Ben 10,000, who has mastered the prototype Omnitrix, along with future versions of Gwen, Max, and several of his long-time enemies. Later, Ben accidentally unlocks "Master Control", a feature enabling him to switch between his alien forms without time constraints. He also learns that the prototype Omnitrix was originally intended for Grandpa Max. Towards the end of summer, the Tennysons battle the Negative 10, a coalition of the family's numerous enemies.

In the film Secret of the Omnitrix, Ben and Gwen are brought to space by Tetrax in search of the prototype Omnitrix's creator after the self-destruct mode is activated. They are headed to Incarcecon to find the creator but instead find Myaxx, a former assistant involved in the development of the prototype Omnitrix and locate the creator on the planet Xenon who is revealed to be Azmuth of the Galvan race. Frustrated by the weaponization of his creation, Azmuth refuses to help Ben, preferring the universe to be destroyed. Meanwhile, Vilgax launches an attack on Xenon using an alien army. Witnessing Ben's battle against Vilgax, despite the futile circumstances, restores Azmuth's faith, repairs the prototype Omnitrix and unlocks the To'kustar alien transformation, which Ben names Way Big to aid in defeating Vilgax. Tetrax returns Ben and Gwen home, and the Tennysons resume their summer adventures.

In the CGI animated film Destroy All Aliens, after the end of summer, Ben returns to his home city but continues to act as a hero occasionally. During a chase with criminals, Gwen hits him with Mana, causing the prototype Omnitrix to overload. Azmuth discovers this and goes to confront him, but is accidentally transformed into Way Big and attacks him. Unexpectedly, he disappears, and Ben and Tetrax head into space, but are hit and Ben is chased around the world by a Galvanic Mechamorph. Back home, Ben is attacked again, with him and his pursuer being teleported inside the prototype Omnitrix. The pursuer believes that the evil Way Big killed Azmuth and seeks revenge. After leaving the prototype Omnitrix, Ben uses Way Big to fight him and reverses his transformation. The pursuer is revealed to be Azmuth's father and apologizes.

In the live-action movie Race Against Time, Ben faces the time traveler Eon, who plans to invade Earth with his army. After being captured, Eon transforms him into himself, but Ben breaks free and defeats him. Originally, it was part of the continuity, but it was retconned from continuity during the airing of Ultimate Alien. Furthermore, the Omniverse flashbacks introduce new storylines that took place a year later, during weekends.

=== Ben 10: Alien Force ===
In between the events of the original series and Alien Force, Ben removed the prototype Omnitrix for unspecified reasons. After Max disappears in the line of duty, Ben reequips the prototype Omnitrix, which, after several years of dormancy, reboots itself, locking his older batch of aliens in favor of a new set of ten aliens. Assisted by Gwen and a reformed Kevin, the group embarks on a mission to find Max. Upon discovering the Highbreed, an alien supremacist race, and their servants, the DNAliens, who are planning to invade Earth, they assemble a team dubbed the Alien Force to thwart their conspiracy.

In his free time, Ben is in a romantic relationship with Julie Yamamoto, and during a date she takes ownership of "Ship," a pet Galvanic Mechamorph. The Alien Force locates Max, but he sacrifices himself to save them from a Highbreed. Following Max's death, the Alien Force forges alliances with several people, including a half Pyronite Alan, time-traveller Professor Paradox, a group of alien hybrids known as the Plumber's Helpers, and a technopath named Cooper. Ben unlocks his 10th alien, Alien X, a Celestialsapien who possesses vast reality-altering abilities. However, he refrains from regular usage of Alien X due to the two personalities, Bellicus and Serena, within it that he must compromise with to use the transformation's abilities. Meanwhile, Albedo, a former assistant of Azmuth, frames Ben for crimes after gaining a duplicate prototype Omnitrix and being transformed into his doppelgänger. Later, while fending off the Null Void from complete control by Dr. Animo, the Alien Force learn Max is still alive and has taken refuge there.

The Highbreed launch their galaxy-wide offensive across the universe, prompting Azmuth to travel to Earth and reinstate the Master Control in the prototype Omnitrix. The Alien Force travel to Augstaka, the Highbreed home world, where they learn that the species is facing extinction due to generations of inbreeding and plan to annihilate the universe as a result. In response, Ben uses the prototype Omnitrix to infuse the Highbreed with DNA from other species, averting their extinction. Although he loses access to Master Control, he retains access to all the aliens he previously used. In Alien Swarm, Ben prevents the Queen from controlling humanity through microchips.

After Vilgax threatens to attack Earth, Ben requests Master Control from Azmuth, who declines due to Ben's growing arrogance. Ben and Kevin's attempt to unlock Master Control independently results in Kevin mutating again, the prototype Omnitrix malfunctioning, and several aliens gaining sentience and escaping. The Alien Force recapture the aliens, and Ben confronts and stops Vilgax.

After escaping from prison and stealing an unstabled and incompleted Omnitrix from Azmuth, Albedo modifies it into the Ultimatrix and equips it with the evolutionary feature: evolving existing aliens within the prototype Omnitrix into their "Ultimate" forms. Seeking revenge on the Alien Force for thwarting his previous attempts to steal the Omnitrix, Vilgax and Albedo form an unlikely alliance and perform abductions of Gwen and Kevin. Max alerts Ben of the situation and Ben battles Albedo but is ultimately defeated. To save his allies, Ben surrenders the prototype Omnitrix, which he self-destructs to prevent Vilgax from using it. Ben takes Albedo's Ultimatrix, which is synced to the prototype Omnitrix's DNA source, the Codon Stream.

=== Ben 10: Ultimate Alien ===
Ben has wielded the Ultimatrix for over a year since defeating Vilgax, and his secret identity has been revealed to the world by a young boy named Jimmy Jones. Ben's newfound fame alters his life, as he is frequently smeared in the news by Will Harangue and is entangled with the celebrity world and media industry. When not navigating the media landscape, the Alien Force is investigating the arrival of five aliens from the Andromeda Galaxy. They learn that these aliens were being hunted by an Osmosian warlord named Aggregor and sought refuge on Earth. Despite the Alien Force's efforts to assist the aliens, they inadvertently facilitate their recapture by Aggregor. After imprisoning the Andromeda aliens, Aggregor merges their DNA with his own and embarks on a quest to gather the four pieces of the Map of Infinity. Despite Ben's efforts, Aggregor manages to obtain the Map of Infinity.

With no other options, Kevin absorbs the alien DNA of Ben's Ultimatrix, sacrificing his sanity in an effort to defeat Aggregor and stop him from gaining the powers of a Celestialsapien. After absorbing Aggregor's acquired DNA from the Andromeda aliens, Kevin departs from the Forge of Creation while leaving Aggregor unconscious. Throughout the universe, Kevin embarks on a revenge-fueled rampage against those who wronged him in the past. Kevin's actions lead to Ben becoming convinced that Kevin needs to be killed to put an end his madness, causing friction between Gwen and Ben as they battle each other. Ultimately, Ben, as Ultimate Echo Echo, confronts Kevin and defeats him in battle. Ben, despite his earlier intention to kill Kevin, ultimately spares him. Kevin is reverted to normal, and the Andromeda aliens are revived.

The Alien Force later encounter another and different future version of Ben 10,000, known as Ultimate Ben, who possesses the ability to use his alien powers in human form. Ultimate Ben, with the assistance of Professor Paradox, confronts Eon, an evil alternate future version of Ben. After defeating Eon and his minions, Ultimate Ben unlocks every locked alien Ben has ever used. In Heroes United, Ben is transported to Generator Rex's universe, where he helps him defeat Alpha.

George, the founder of the Forever Knights, reunites the group's divided splinter factions to combat the return of the entity Dagon. Meanwhile, the Flame Keepers Circle, a cult dedicated to Dagon, discovers the stranded Vilgax and mistakenly assume him to be Dagon. Vilgax becomes a pawn for Dagon while a war breaks out between the Forever Knights and the Esoterica, Dagon's followers. The conflict results in most of the Knights being killed, including George. Vilgax betrays Dagon and absorbs his essence into himself. Ben stops Vilgax and absorbs Dagon's essence into the sword Ascalon before using Ascalon to revert the Esoterica to normal. In recognition of Ben's efforts, Azmuth awards him the completed Omnitrix and takes the Ultimatrix to destroy.

=== Ben 10: Omniverse ===
The storyline alternates between that of 11-year-old Ben (one year after the original series) and 16-year-old Ben (several months after Ultimate Alien). In the present day, Gwen and Kevin leave for college and Ben is assigned to work with Rook Blonko, a newly deputized Plumber. Together, Ben and Rook travel underneath Bellwood to the underground city of Undertown to address the rising rates of organized crime. Ben is pursued by the alien hunter Khyber, whose hunting dog Zed can transform into predatory aliens utilizing the Nemetrix (a device similar to the Omnitrix).

Ben and Rook investigate an abandoned ship near Earth containing the Annihilargh, a doomsday device capable of erasing entire universes. It attracts the attention of multiple parties, including the Plumbers and the Incurseans. It is mistakenly activated, erasing the entire universe except for Ben, who survives as Alien X. Unable to reverse the universes' destruction, Ben convinces its personalities, Bellicus and Serena, to recreate the universe.

Ben is captured by Khyber after an argument with Rook and he learns about the creation of the Nemetrix along with the shared history between Khyber and his allies. Ben and Rook reconcile and later fend off Plumber HQ from Psychobos after he steals a piece of the Omnitrix to perfect the Nemetrix.

Khyber and his allies launch an attack on Galvan Prime, and Malware destroys Galvan B, the Galvanic Mechamorph home world. After landing on Galvan Prime, Malware battles Ben, defeating him and trapping him within his body. Inside Malware, Ben subconsciously meets his 11-year-old younger self and confronts his past. By addressing his regret over the loss of Feedback, who was destroyed by Malware five years prior, Ben makes amends with himself and regains Feedback. As Feedback, Ben defeats Malware, leaving his remains as stone. Ben joins the Saturday family to defeat V. V. Argost, who has allied himself with Dr. Animo. Shortly afterward, Ben and Rook accidentally travel to an alternate universe and meet Ben 23, a version of Ben who became a celebrity and began acting recklessly after his universe's Max died. They manage to help him become more responsible.

The Incurseans, a frog-like alien species, launch an invasion of Earth and succeed in conquering it with the help of mutated To'kustars. Ben is sent to exile in outer space but is saved by Azmuth. Ben uses his Incursean alien transformation, Bullfrag, to infiltrate the Incurseans and free their prisoners, without any of his friends knowing. The Incurseans are ultimately stopped and the To'kustars are imprisoned in the Null Void.

Vilgax and Eon form a partnership and secretly recruit evil versions of Ben across the multiverse along with Albedo. Professor Paradox enlists the help of Ben—referred to by Paradox as "Ben Prime", due to his role as the origin point of the entire multiverse—along with Ben 23, Gwen 10 (a version of Gwen who acquired the prototype Omnitrix before Ben) and his future self Ben 10,000 to save No Watch Ben, a version of Ben from a universe where the prototype Omnitrix was never created. Vilgax betrays Eon and uses the Chronosapien Time Bomb to erase every universe except No Watch Ben's universe. Before Ben Prime is erased from existence, he gives the Omnitrix to No Watch Ben, who utilizes the alien transformation Clockwork to restore the multiverse before returning the Omnitrix to Ben Prime.

The Celestialsapiens hold Ben for trial for his illegal recreation of the universe. After being found guilty, Ben's Galvan lawyer, Chadzmuth, offers to invoke the "Tetramand Trial of Combat" to ensure his innocence. He wins and, in the process, gains the complete control of Alien X. Ben Prime and Ben 23 are left stranded in an alternate universe and have to work with Dr. Psychobos to free themselves. They later stage a revolt against that world's leader, Mad Ben, and return to their respective universes.

Ben and Rook follow Maltruant in his quest to reach the beginning of time. After reaching the Contemelia ship, Maltruant uses the Annihilargh in an attempt to recreate the universe in his image. Ben uses Feedback to absorb the Annihilargh's energy and destroy Maltruant, who is trapped in a time loop where he will attempt to reassemble himself and create his own universe, but fail each time at the end after his last defeat by Ben. After returning to Bellwood, Ben and Rook contact Gwen and Kevin to join them in a road trip across space.

== Ben Tennyson (2016 series) ==
Ben Tennyson
- Ben 10 character
- Ben Tennyson as depicted in Ben 10 (2016)
- First appearance: "Waterfilter" (October 8, 2016)
- Last appearance: "Alien X-Tinction" (April 11, 2021)
- Created by: Joe Kelly; Joe Casey; Duncan Rouleau; Steven T. Seagle
- Voiced by: Tara Strong (child) (2016–2021); Yuri Lowenthal (elderly; teenager counterparts) (2018; 2021)

In-universe information
- Full name: Benjamin Kirby Tennyson
- Species: Human
- Occupation: Superhero
- Weapon: Omnitrix
- Family: Max Tennyson (grandfather); Gwen Tennyson (cousin)
- Nationality: American
- Abilities: Omnitrix allows transformation into various alien species

This version is a reboot of the franchise set in an alternate universe—later designated in Alien X-Tinction as Dimension 27998.3—featuring a reimagined Ben, his cousin Gwen, and Grandpa Max as they travel the country during summer vacation. Tara Strong reprises her role as Ben with Yuri Lowenthal briefly voicing an elderly version of Ben in the episode "The 11th Alien, Part 1". Both Strong and Lowenthal also voice alternate counterparts based on the earlier incarnations of Ben from previous shows in "Alien X-Tinction".

=== Personality ===
"No, I'm Ben Tennyson, and I'll do anything to save my family. Omnitrix or not. That's what a hero does."

— Ben to Azmuth.

Ben is portrayed as someone who prefers having fun to fulfilling his obligations. However, despite his carefree attitude, Ben has also demonstrated heroic and altruistic behavior, being willing to help and save anyone in need, including his enemies. He can be impulsive and reckless, often acting without thinking, which can cause him problems. He also tends to get bored easily and has difficulties with math and science.

Ben is known for acting without considering the consequences, and his reckless behavior frequently gets him into trouble. His tendency to make mistakes has been noted by his family, who sometimes comment on it even when he hasn't done anything wrong. He has admitted to feeling self-assured and afraid to show his emotions, often hiding behind various identities. He has expressed that the Omnitrix is the only thing he considers truly valuable about himself, although he has also demonstrated the ability to focus on the positive side. He has also shown himself to be understanding and sometimes recognizes almost immediately when he says something offensive or "exaggerated."

Despite his flaws, Ben is committed to protecting his family and his planet, even in the face of challenges. Although he is generally impulsive, reckless, and tends to choose his alien forms based on superficial preferences or favoritism, he is surprisingly aware of his limitations and, in certain situations, manages to choose the correct form without any encouragement from others. Ben is also cautious with alien forms over which he has little control, often needing encouragement to even consider using them.

=== Abilities ===
Ben has already demonstrated enhanced physical capabilities, possibly resulting from the Omnitrix's physiological adaptations.

==== Equipment ====
Like his original counterpart, Ben is the wielder of the Omnitrix, which allows him to transform into millions of alien forms from across the galaxy, usually in sets of 10 alien forms at a time. Unlike its original counterpart, the Omnitrix tends to malfunction whenever the watch has more than 10 alien forms, as seen when Ben acquired the 11th alien, Gax, a Chimera Sui Generis later revealed to be the stolen genetic half of Vilgax. Vilgax later absorbs Gax, regaining his full strength and resulting in Ben losing access to Gax.

In addition to his aliens transformations, through various circumstances throughout the series, Ben gained the ability to equip his alien forms with powerful armor as the result of the Omnitrix being upgraded: the Omni-Enhanced Armor, accidentally unlocked after Ben uses Upgrade to update the Omnitrix during his battle with Vilgax in the first season finale, which grants energy-based stone armor that boosts offensive power; the Omni-Kix Armor, unlocked during the fourth season when Ben inserting the Omnitrix Key into the watch, giving his alien forms highly durable mechanical armor; and the Omni-Naut Armor, an upgrade to the Omni-Kix Armor built specifically for space exploration, unlocking during the events of Ben 10 Versus The Universe: The Movie when Ben reinserts the Omnitrix Key in the right way.

Also in the movie, Ben discovers a new method in using the Omnitrix during one of Azmuth's trials in the Null Void, figured that by manually pulling up the dial, he unlocked an option to manually select an alien form that was not in the current default roster. Through this method, Ben barely able to pass Azmuth's trials using Goop, and even transforming into Way Big through this method to even the playing field against a Celestialsapien-infused Vilgax, dubbed "Alien V".

=== Fictional character biography ===
The three stopped near Mount Rushmore, where Ben ended up seeing a capsule fall while collecting firewood. Upon arriving at the crash site, he found the Omnitrix, which was stuck to his wrist. Immediately, he transformed into Four Arms and confronted some drones that had been sent to Earth to obtain the Omnitrix. After unlocking his 11th alien, Gax, Ben encounters the elder Vilgax. Vilgax absorbs Gax's DNA to regain his youth and full power, removing Gax from the Omnitrix. While battling Vilgax, Ben uses Upgrade to enhance the Omnitrix, which removes Upgrade from the Omnitrix and unlocks a new alien named Shock Rock. Shock Rock's influence gives Ben's other aliens "Omni-Enhanced" forms, coating them in electrical rock armor similar to Shock Rock's own.

Ben and Vilgax travel within the Omnitrix and meet Glitch, a hybrid entity created from Ben and Upgrade's DNA. It is revealed that Shock Rock had been sending signals to his species' home planet, creating a portal that allows the Fulmni to invade Earth. The three battle the Fulmini, but matters are complicated when the High Override sends Vilgax to the Null Void and Ben is placed under his control. Max and Gwen go within the Omnitrix and help Ben break free from the Override's control and help defeat the High Override. The Omnitrix reboots and Glitch transports them and himself out of the Omnitrix.

Phill Billings, Max's friend, gives the Tennysons the Omni Copter to traverse around the world and they learn that Ben's old schooler Kevin Levin has his own version of the Omnitrix dubbed the Antitrix. Ben and Kevin form a rivalry with each other and battle around the world. In Crossover Nexus, Ben is sent to the Nexus Realm, where, along with Garnet, K.O., and Raven, they defeat Strike, who was stealing the powers of Cartoon Network characters. Meanwhile, the mysterious Forever Knight is gathering intel on Ben. Ben is manipulated into working with the Forever Knight and the group of villains he has gathered up for his goal of preventing alien life from reaching Earth, only to come to his senses and betray Forever Knight.

In the film, VS The Universe, Vilgax crashes to Earth in a pod that is mistaken for a meteor. While trying to stop the pod, Ben is abducted by a spaceship and is sent to the Null Void, where he meets Azmuth, the creator of the Omnitrix. Ben learns how to unlock more aliens, including several aliens that were previously locked and replaced, and leaves the Null Void to return to Earth. Meanwhile, the Tennysons are assisting Kevin, but encounter Vilgax. Vilgax takes the Antitrix from Kevin and attacks the Tennysons, Phil, and Kevin. Vilgax grows exhausted of setbacks and terraforms Earth, but Ben stops him and Azmuth uses the Omnitrix to return Earth to normal.

Towards the end of summer, Ben meets his future self and defends Earth from the invading Xerge. He assists a young Rex Salazar and teams up with several heroics alternate versions of himself throughout the multiverse to stop an evil Alien X, who turns out to be an alternative version of Ben called Ben X.

== Ben Tennyson (2026 Dynamite comics) ==
Ben Tennyson
- Ben 10 character
- First appearance: Ben 10 (Vol. 1) #1 (May 6, 2026)
- Created by: Joe Kelly; Joe Casey; Duncan Rouleau; Steven T. Seagle
- Designed by: Robert Carey

In-universe information
- Full name: Benjamin Kirby Tennyson
- Species: Human
- Occupation: Superhero
- Weapon: Omnitrix
- Family: Max Tennyson (grandfather); Gwen Tennyson (cousin)
- Nationality: American
- Abilities: Omnitrix allows transformation into various alien species

This version is another reboot of the franchise set in an alternate universe featuring a reimagined Ben, his cousin Gwen, and Grandpa Max as they travel the country during summer vacation.

=== Concept and creation ===
Man of Action announced their collaboration with Dynamite Comics in January 2026, to develop a new line of Ben 10 comic books. The announcement marked the franchise's return to comic publishing under Dynamite. The initial story arc will be written by Joe Casey with art by Robert Carey. The story format will reportedly be similar to classic superhero comics, building the mythology slowly and steadily with short, accessible story arcs. The comics series will explore Ben in more dangerous and high-risk situations than ever before, and will include elements of cosmic and body horror. The tone of the series is darker than previous versions. The series debuted in May 2026.

=== Fictional character biography ===
Ben was taken, along with his cousin Gwen, on a summer road trip across the country with his grandfather Max. One night, while melting marshmallows in a forest, Ben went exploring the woods after an argument with Gwen, which led him to find a meteor that had fallen into the forest. After inspecting the crater, the Omnitrix emerged from the hole and quickly coiled around his wrist. Realizing that the military was looking for him, Ben fled until he encountered a cybernetically enhanced bear, with the Omnitrix transforming him into Four Arms. After a brief fight, Ben reverted to human form and fled from the bear, begging the Omnitrix to transform him back. When the device's green button lit up, Ben pressed it and transformed into Heatblast, which scared the bear away.

Desperate, he asked to revert to normal while burning everything around him, with the Omnitrix rapidly transforming him into a series of other aliens before reverting back to normal. Unable to find his way in the forest, Ben encountered the military again after seeing something fall from the sky. While fleeing, the Omnitrix transformed him into Cannonbolt, who escaped at high speed in his spherical form. Thinking he had reached the camp, he was pursued by Gwen, who mistook him for an alien invader and tried to run him over with the trailer.

Ben escaped the Rustbucket and reverted to his human form. After telling Gwen what had happened, the RV was summoned by Max and began driving itself toward the military complex in the forest, carrying them along. Upon seeing the military forces being slaughtered by Kraab, Gwen urged Ben to use the Omnitrix to take action. Transforming into Diamondhead, he attacked the alien but was defeated and reverted to his human form, revealing to Kraab that he possessed the Omnitrix. Before Kraab could kill him, Max briefly stunned the alien with a particle blast, giving Ben enough time to transform into Four Arms. He defeated Kraab and got into the Rustbucket, escaping the military while they were distracted by Max's smoke screen.

In a nightmare, Wildvine has his limbs torn off by black tentacles, an event that wakes Ben up. Gwen teases him, and Max intervenes to comfort Ben. Gwen and Ben argue about his competence with the Omnitrix; this leads him to try and scare her by transforming into Four Arms, but she knocks him down. Max tells them they don't want to draw unwanted attention to the RV. At the supermarket, the cousins buy supplies. Ben spots a Sumo Slammers card but is startled when a clown hands him an amusement park flyer. Ben, who is afraid of clowns, argues against going, but Gwen thinks Max would disagree. Suddenly, he transforms into Heatblast and tries to grab the flyer from Gwen, but she knocks him down. Max finds them and scolds Ben for transforming before even looking at the flyer. At the amusement park, Max and Ben reconcile, though Ben soon breaks his promise. Using XLR8, he tries to win a game but fails, unlike Gwen. At the circus, Zombozo performs. When Ben mocks him, Zombozo uses his hypnotic powers, causing Max and the audience to panic. Zombozo taunts Ben, who tries to transform into Four Arms but ends up as Stinkfly instead. Zombozo tricks Max into believing Stinkfly is a demon, causing him to flee. Stinkfly chases after his grandfather but reverts to human form just as Max trips and falls off a cliff.

As Max plummets down a ravine, Ben calls out to him. Luckily, Max catches onto a branch on the slope. Gwen throws a rope to Ben. Not strong enough to pull him up, Ben tries to use the Omnitrix but transforms into Grey Matter instead. He executes a plan, but just as he nears Max, the branch snaps. Gwen ties the rope to a stump, suspending them in mid-air before they hit the ground. Max remains in a trance, calling Ben a monster. The Circus Freaks catch up to the trio and rescue Max. Gwen grabs Grey Matter and escapes by swinging away, landing in some trees. Ben reverts to human form, and after spotting several pairs of glowing eyes in the forest, the two decide to make a strategic retreat. Back in the Rustbucket, Ben complains that the Omnitrix isn't working. Gwen snaps him back to reality as she plans a way to save their grandfather. Ben brainstorms ways to defeat the Circus Freaks, though Gwen objects to his ideas. He exits the Rustbucket and, as Heatblast, flies over the circus grounds. Acid Breath spots him and tries to attack with toxic gas but is neutralized, causing the villain to fall. Thumbskull and Frightwig join the fight, which spills over into the circus itself. Zombozo greets Ben—who has reverted to human form—and begs the boy to join his circus. He orders the activation of the "Zombo-wave," but Gwen appears driving a clown-themed go-kart. She picks up Ben and begins pouring gasoline around the tent. Gwen leaves Ben to rescue Max, but Zombozo grabs him. Ben transforms into Grey Matter and escapes. While Zombozo is distracted, Ben reverts to human form, snapping Max out of his trance. Suddenly, thanks to Gwen, the dish explodes, thwarting Zombozo's plans. Later, miles away in the Rustbucket, Ben wakes up from another nightmare. Before telling Gwen about it, he thanks her for destroying the plate, and she praises his idea to lure the police to the circus using his aliens. Ben begins to recount his nightmare about an impostor of Max taking the cousins to Cluckee's Roadside Haven. The real Max then appears and offers to take them to Cluckee's Haven—an offer they refuse, much to his confusion.

== Alternate versions ==
=== Ben 10,000 (2005 series & Omniverse) ===
Ben 10,000 (voiced by Fred Tatasciore in the original series and Judd Nelson in Omniverse) is a version of Ben from a possible future. He has mastered all the functions of the prototype Omnitrix, becoming a well-known hero throughout the universe and working full-time. He debuts in the self-titled episode "Ben 10,000" in the 2005 series. After Ben 10,000 defeats Exo-Skull he comes into contact with his 10-year-old younger self, who was brought 20 years into the future by Gwen, who lured the younger Ben by taking her younger self. Though initially unfazed and resistant, his interaction with his younger self throughout the episode helps him change his ways, and the two face off against Vilgax and Dr. Animo. By the end of the episode, he learns to loosen up and value his family. His next appearance is in the episode "Ken 10", where he gifts a replica prototype Omnitrix that he made for his son Ken's 10th birthday. After confronting Kevin 11,000, Ben adopts his son, Devlin.

Ben 10,000 returns in Omniverse, first briefly appearing in the episode "Ben Again", where is searching for Professor Paradox and warning his younger self about the impending Time War. He later returns in the two-part story "And Then There Were None" and "And Then There Was Ben", fighting alongside his teenage counterpart, Paradox, alternate heroic Bens, and Gwen 10 against an alliance led by Vilgax and Eon, along with several evil Ben counterparts. In "Let's Do the Time War Again", he assists his younger self and Paradox in confronting Eon and the Time Beast, and in "The End of an Era", it is shown that he is married to his first love interest Kai Green, and he confronts Maltruant again and discovers that his son Ken has been secretly traveling through time to aid Ben under the alias Chrono Spanner.

=== Ben 10,000 (Ultimate Alien) ===
Ben 10,000 (voiced by Sean Donnellan) is a different version of Ben 10,000 than the one introduced in the 2005 series. He is introduced in Ben 10: Ultimate Alien, in the episode "Ben 10,000 Returns". This version of Ben 10,000 used the Ultimatrix and learned to use magic, in addition to unlocking "Ultimate Ben", which allows him to use his alien powers without transforming. He also became president of Earth for a brief period, before being succeeded by Gwen. Ben travels to the past with Professor Paradox, and with the help of his younger self, prevents Eon from using the Hands of Armageddon.

=== Ben 23 ===
Ben 23 (voiced by Tara Strong) is an alternate version of Ben from Dimension 23. He debuts in Ben 10: Omniverse, in the episode "Store 23". Following the death of his grandfather Max, Ben 23 grew up without guidance and used the Omnitrix primarily for fame and financial success, becoming an arrogant celebrity hero who prioritizes publicity over helping others. After meeting Ben Prime, he begins to reassess his behavior and gradually moves toward becoming a more responsible hero under the guidance of his dimension's Azmuth. In "And Then There Were None" and "And Then There Was Ben", Ben 23 is recruited by Professor Paradox alongside several alternate versions of Ben to stop Vilgax's attempt to eliminate every Ben Tennyson in the multiverse, though he is temporarily erased by the Chronosapien Time Bomb before being restored and helping to defeat Vilgax. In "It's a Mad, Mad, Mad Ben World", Ben Prime mentors Ben 23 to become a better hero, leading to a confrontation with Maltruant and the tyrannical Mad Ben in another dimension. After the conflict, Ben 23 reflects on his responsibilities and acknowledges that he should use the Omnitrix to improve people's lives.

=== No Watch Ben ===
No Watch Ben (Note: The character is only identified as "No Watch Ben" in scripts and model sheets; within the series itself, he is referred to simply as Ben.) (voiced by Yuri Lowenthal) is an alternate version of Ben introduced in Ben 10: Omniverse from a timeline where he never discovered the prototype Omnitrix, living an otherwise ordinary life in Bellwood. As a result, he grows up without the adventures that shaped his Prime counterpart, leaving him bored with his routine and distant from Gwen after their uneventful summer trip with Grandpa Max. When he encounters hostile alternate versions of himself in the episode "And Then There Were None", No Watch Ben initially panics due to his lack of combat experience and the sudden revelation that other Bens can transform into aliens.

In "And Then There Was Ben", Professor Paradox recruits No Watch Ben to help repair the timeline after Vilgax uses the Chronosapien Time Bomb to erase every Omnitrix-wielding Ben from existence. Using Ben Prime's Omnitrix, No Watch Ben travels back in time to ensure that his counterpart originally discovers the device, later restoring the erased Bens by transforming into Clockwork. After helping defeat Vilgax, he returns the Omnitrix to Ben Prime and learns that heroism is defined by one's actions rather than the Omnitrix itself.

=== Mad Ben ===
Mad Ben (Note: The character is only identified as "Mad Ben" in scripts and model sheets; within the series itself, he is referred to simply as Ben.) (voiced by Yuri Lowenthal) is an evil alternate version of Ben Tennyson from a post-apocalyptic dimension where Bellwood has become a desert wasteland. A tyrannical warlord wielding a spiked Omnitrix known as the Power Watch, Mad Ben rules his world through fear and brutality, believing his heroic counterparts are weak. He is first seen in the Ben 10: Omniverse episodes "And Then There Were None" and "And Then There Was Ben", where he is recruited by Eon and Vilgax alongside other villainous Ben variants to eliminate No Watch Ben. Like the other Omnitrix-wielding Bens, he is erased when Vilgax activates the Chronosapien Time Bomb before later being restored when No Watch Ben reverses its effects.

Mad Ben returns as the central antagonist of "It's a Mad, Mad, Mad Ben World", when Ben Prime and Ben 23 are accidentally transported to his dimension. There, he forces enslaved citizens to search for Maltruant's lost Time Key and battles his heroic counterparts while attempting to maintain control of his wasteland empire. After a prolonged confrontation, Mad Ben is ultimately defeated when Ben Prime incapacitates him and his own allies turn against him, leading to his arrest and the liberation of his subjects.

=== Ben 10,000 (2016 series) ===
Ben 10,000 (voiced by Fred Tatasciore) is a version of Ben from a dystopian future who appears in the Ben 10 special "Ben 10,010". This Ben had a confrontation with Steam Smythe and had accidentally sent a signal to the invasive species known as Xerge who invaded Earth. Ben's Omnitrix upgraded for the fourth time and had given him access to 10,000 aliens. During an incident, Ben had failed his family and friends. After 20 years in hiding, Ben emerges to battle the Xerge. After some arguing, Ben has a vision of his 10-year-old younger self and travels back in time through a time portal developed by the reformed Steam Smythe and Dr. Animo. He brings his past self to the future and the two of them face off against the Xerge and successfully defeat them. After his past self returns to the past, Ben 10,000 shaves his beard, loses weight and returns to his hero activities.

=== Ben X ===
Ben X (Note: The end credits of Alien X-Tinction only credited Fred Tatasciore as Alien X. However, the end credits of the Brazilian version of the special on HBO Max credited this Ben as "Ben X". Within the special itself, he is referred to simply as Ben.) (voiced by Fred Tatasciore) is an alternate version of Ben who appears in the Ben 10 special "Alien X-Tinction". In his timeline, Gwen and Grandpa Max are killed when Vilgax destroys the Rustbucket during a battle, leading Ben to defeat Vilgax in a rage by shattering the Omnitrix as Four Arms, triggering an explosion that also unlocks Alien X. Traumatized by the loss of his family, this Ben becomes bitter and vengeful, deciding that every Ben across the multiverse should suffer the same fate. As Alien X, he travels across dimensions stealing Omnitrixes and attacking other Bens until he is ultimately defeated by the Ben of Dimension 27998.3. After his defeat, he is taken to the Null Void by Alternate Max, who plans to rehabilitate him following his imprisonment.

=== Other versions ===
Other notable versions of Ben across the franchise include:

- Bad Ben (Note: The character is only identified as "Bad Ben" in scripts and model sheets; within the series itself, he is referred to simply as Ben.) (voiced by Yuri Lowenthal) is an evil alternate version of Ben who appears in the Ben 10: Omniverse episodes "And Then There Were None" and "And Then There Was Ben". Sadistic and manipulative, he is recruited by Eon and Vilgax to eliminate No Watch Ben and fights alongside other villainous Ben variants. After being erased by the Chronosapien Time Bomb, he is later restored when No Watch Ben reverses its effects before being returned to his own timeline.
- Nega Ben (Note: The character is only identified as "Nega Ben" in scripts and model sheets; within the series itself, he is referred to simply as Ben.) (voiced by Yuri Lowenthal) is an evil alternate version of Ben who appears in the Ben 10: Omniverse episodes "And Then There Were None" and "And Then There Was Ben". Characterized by a gloomy and apathetic personality, he is recruited by Eon and Vilgax alongside other villainous Ben variants to eliminate No Watch Ben and participates in the battle between the good and evil Bens. After being erased by the Chronosapien Time Bomb, he is later restored when No Watch Ben reverses its effects before ultimately being returned to his own dimension.
- Benzarro (voiced by Yuri Lowenthal) is an evil alternate version of Ben who appears in the Ben 10: Omniverse episodes "And Then There Were None" and "And Then There Was Ben". Originating from a reality affected by a zombie-like outbreak, Benzarro has a monstrous appearance and primitive behavior, often speaking in broken phrases and acting instinctively. Recruited by Eon and Vilgax alongside other villainous Ben variants, he participates in the hunt for No Watch Ben and the ensuing battle between the good and evil Bens. After being erased by the Chronosapien Time Bomb, he is later restored when No Watch Ben reverses its effects before ultimately being returned to his own dimension.

== In other media ==
=== Film ===
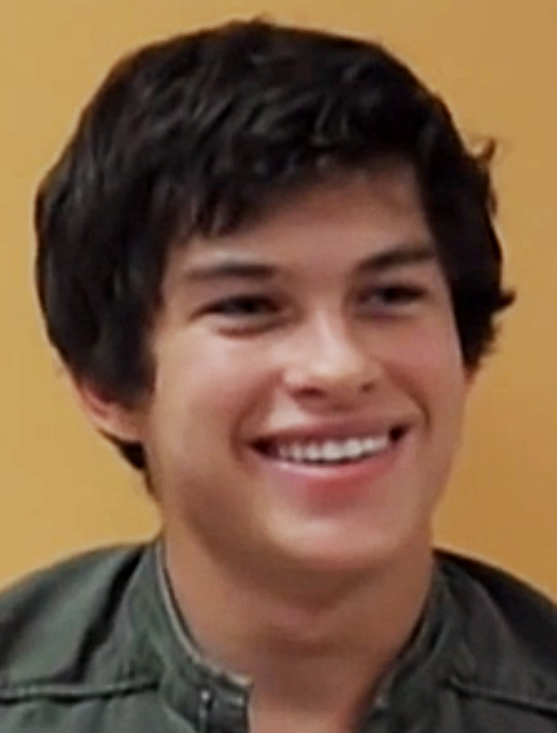
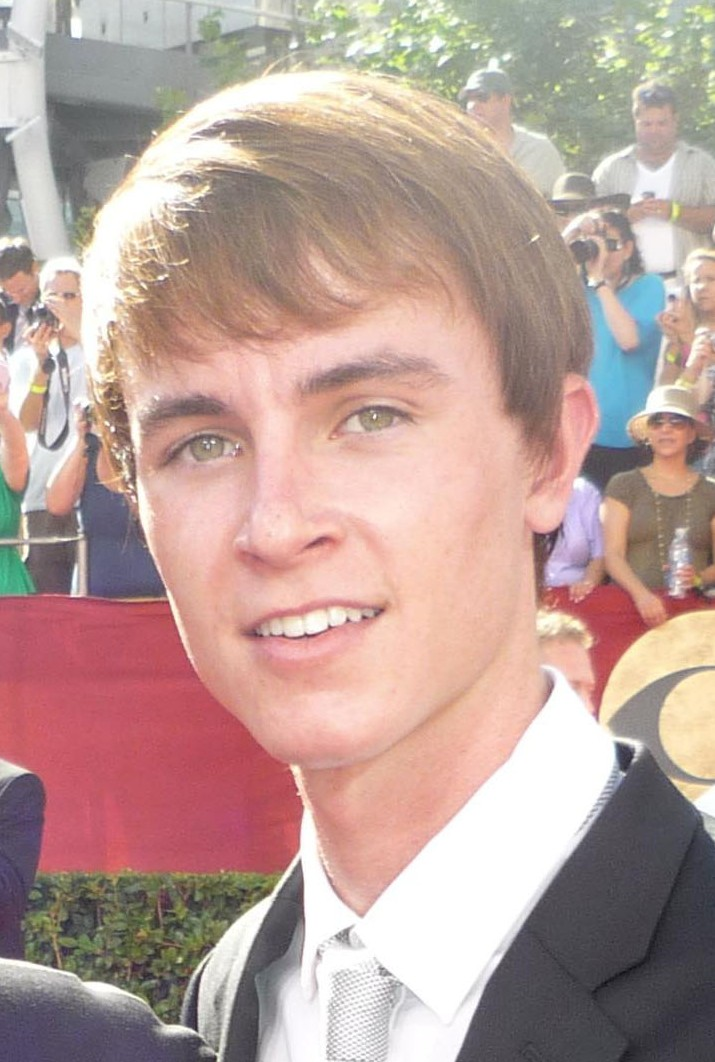
Philips (left) and Kelley (right) portrayed Ben in Race Against Time and Alien Swarm, respectively

==== Animation ====
- Ben appears in the 2007 television film Ben 10: Secret of the Omnitrix, voiced by Tara Strong.
- Ben appears in the 2012 television film Ben 10: Destroy All Aliens, with Strong reprising her role.
- Ben appears in the 2020 television film Ben 10: Versus the Universe, voiced again by Strong. This film is set in the continuity of the 2016 series.

==== Live action ====
- In the 2007 television film Ben 10: Race Against Time, he was portrayed by Graham Phillips.
- In the 2009 television film Ben 10: Alien Swarm, he was portrayed by Ryan Kelley. According to Kelley, two additional sequels were planned but never came to fruition.

=== Video games ===
- Ben appears in Ben 10, a video game released in 2006 for the Mattel HyperScan.
- Ben appears in 2007 game Ben 10: Protector of Earth, voiced again by Tara Strong. It released for the Nintendo DS, PlayStation 2, PlayStation Portable, and Wii.
- Ben appears in Ben 10: Alien Force, voiced by Yuri Lowenthal. It was released in 2008 for the Nintendo DS, PlayStation 2, PlayStation Portable, and Wii.
- Ben appears in Ben 10: Alien Force – Vilgax Attacks, voiced again by Lowenthal. It was released in 2009 for Nintendo DS, PlayStation 2, PlayStation Portable, Wii, and Xbox 360.
- Ben appears in Ben 10: Alien Force – The Rise of Hex, voiced again by Lowenthal. It was released in 2010 for Wii and Xbox 360.
- Ben appears in Ben 10: Ultimate Alien – Cosmic Destruction, voiced again by Lowenthal. It was released in 2010 for the Nintendo DS, PlayStation 2, PlayStation 3, PlayStation Portable, Wii, and Xbox 360.
- Ben appears as a playable character in Ben 10: Galactic Racing, with Lowenthal reprising his role. It was released in 2011 for the PlayStation 3, Xbox 360, Wii, PlayStation Vita, Nintendo 3DS, and Nintendo DS.
- Ben appears in the game as a playable character in the 2011 game Cartoon Network: Punch Time Explosion. Swampfire, Humongousaur, Big Chill, and AmpFibian appear as Ben's playable aliens. The young version of Ben appears in the console version of the game as a playable character. Both Lowenthal and Strong reprise their roles as teenage and young Ben respectively.
- Ben appears in Ben 10: Omniverse, with Yuri Lowenthal and Tara Strong reprising their roles as teenage and young Ben respectively. It was released in 2012 for PlayStation 3, Xbox 360, Nintendo DS, Nintendo 3DS, Wii and Wii U.
- Ben appears in Ben 10: Omniverse 2, voiced again by Lowenthal. It was released in 2013 for PlayStation 3, Xbox 360, Nintendo 3DS, Wii and Wii U.
- Ben appears in Ben 10, voiced by Tara Strong. It is set in continuity of the 2016 series. It was released in 2017 for the PlayStation 4, Xbox One, Nintendo Switch and Windows.
- Ben appears in Ben 10: Power Trip, voiced again by Strong. It was released in 2021 for the PlayStation 4, Xbox One, Nintendo Switch and Windows.
- Ben appears in Minecraft as part of the Ben 10 DLC pack, featuring both Story Mode and Free Roam Mode.
- A Ben Tennyson skin based on his Ultimate Alien counterpart, along with Heatblast and Alien X styles was added to Fortnite.

=== Comics ===
- Ben appears in the Ben 10 comic, developed by Jason Hall, Min G. Kuand and Heroic Age, the Ben 10 comic revolves around Ben's summer vacation with Gwen and their Grandpa Max, travelling in the Rust Bucket.
  - Ben appears in the Ben 10: Alien Force comic revolves around Ben, with Gwen and a reformed Kevin, battling the Highbreed and the DNAliens.
- Ben appears in the Cartoon Network Action Pack comics, which was a 2006–2012 comic book series made by DC Comics which showcased Ben 10 alongside Samurai Jack, Codename: Kids Next Door, The Secret Saturdays, or Generator Rex.
- Ben was featured in comics by IDW Publishing in partnership with Cartoon Network to produce comics based on Cartoon Network properties. Ben 10 was one of the titles announced to be published.

== See also ==
- List of Ben 10 characters
- Robby Reed and Chris King and Vicki Grant
