= Ben 10: Alien Force – The Rise of Hex =

2010 video game

Ben 10: Alien Force - The Rise of Hex
- Developer: Black Lantern Studios
- Publisher: Konami Digital Entertainment
- Series: Ben 10
- Platforms: Wii, Xbox 360
- Release: Xbox 360: WW: May 26, 2010; Wii: NA: May 31, 2010; PAL: December 17, 2010
- Genre: Platform
- Mode: Single-player

Ben 10: Alien Force – The Rise of Hex is a platform game released for the Wii and Xbox 360 in 2010. It is the fourth game in the Ben 10 video game series and the third game based on the Ben 10: Alien Force series. It is no longer available after being delisted from both WiiWare and Xbox Live Arcade.

== Overview ==
Ben 10 Alien Force: The Rise of Hex is a side-scrolling 2D-platformer where the player controls Ben Tennyson. Throughout the game, players are able to transform into ten aliens: Swampfire, Echo Echo, Humungousaur, Jetray, Big Chill, Chromastone, Brainstorm, Spidermonkey, Goop, and Lodestar.

== Reception ==
Reception

Aggregate score
Aggregator	Score
Metacritic	52/100 (Wii); 46/100 (Xbox 360)

Review scores
Publication	Score
IGN	4.5/10 (Wii)
Nintendo Life	7/10 (Wii)

Ben 10 Alien Force: The Rise of Hex received mixed reviews. Ryan Clement of IGN called it, "a waste of ten dollars. It has mundane, awkward platforming, no story context, and a strange difficulty imbalance."
