= BF3 =

BF3 may refer to:

- Boron trifluoride, a chemical compound
- Battlefield 3, a 2011 video game published by Electronic Arts
- Star Wars Battlefront (2015) video game, the third game in the series
- British Formula Three Championship

== See also ==
- BF2
