= Ben 10: Race Against Time =

2007 television film directed by Alex Winter

- Promotional poster
- Based on: Ben 10 by Man of Action
- Screenplay by: Mitch Watson
- Story by: Thomas Pugsley; Greg Klein
- Directed by: Alex Winter
- Starring: Graham Phillips; Christien Anholt; Haley Ramm; Beth Littleford; Don McManus; Sab Shimono; Aloma Wright; Robert Picardo; Lee Majors
- Music by: Andy Sturmer
- Country of origin: United States
- Original language: English

Production
- Producers: Evan W. Adler; Sam Register (Note: Register and Wigzell are co-executive producers); Tramm Wigzell; Alex Winter (Note: Winter and Naito are executive producers); Ramsey Ann Naito
- Cinematography: Morgan Pierre Susser
- Editor: Suzanne Hines
- Running time: 67 minutes
- Production company: Alive and Kicking, Inc.
- Budget: US$5 million

Original release
- Network: Cartoon Network
- Release: November 21, 2007

Ben 10: Race Against Time (also known as Ben 10: The Movie) is a 2007 American superhero film based on the animated television series Ben 10, created by Man of Action.

The working title was Ben 10 in the Hands of Armageddon. Directed by Alex Winter, it premiered on November 21, 2007, in the United States as a Cartoon Network original film.

== Plot ==
The story opens in Bellwood as a mysterious black figure appears on the town’s main street and immediately starts destroying things around him. Ten-year-old Ben Tennyson, in the form of Heatblast, confronts and obliterates him after a short battle.

The next day, Ben goes back to school, and has trouble adjusting to normal life again. After a bad day, he gets bullied by Cash, J.T., and two girls he had tried to flirt with earlier. Ben transforms into Grey Matter accidentally and gets revenge by causing chaos at a diner. Later, he and his cousin Gwen Tennyson come across the same villain Ben defeated earlier. Max Tennyson identifies him as Eon, a member of a time-controlling alien species from the planet Chronia known as the Chronians, whom the Plumbers captured almost two centuries ago. When he arrived, he was half-dead and had a device called "the Hands of Armageddon", which would open a gateway to his home dimension and unleash his race upon Earth if activated. They travel to the containment facility where Eon is supposed to be kept in suspended animation, but find it empty and his guard aged to near-death. The guard tells Max not to let Eon find the hardware store, where the Hands were kept, and warns Ben that Eon is after him.

Traveling back to Bellwood, Max takes Ben and Gwen to the Hands of Armageddon, guarded by the few remaining Plumbers. Eon follows them and breaks into the facility, but cannot activate the device. When Ben attempts to use the Omnitrix, it malfunctions, glowing bright purple and hurting Ben. Eon attempts to kidnap Ben, claiming it to be a rescue, but Ben escapes. Eon manages to corner Ben, explaining that his race learned to control time itself, which is how he survived Ben obliterating him earlier, but trapped themselves by misusing their power. He claims that his fate is intertwined with Ben's. Eon is scared off by an elderly Plumber before he can elaborate.

Max advises Ben to leave Bellwood so that Eon will not find him, but Ben refuses, and they come to a deal where Ben will be monitored daily by the Plumbers. When Ben goes to the school gym to be alone, Eon ambushes him, and tries to use the Omnitrix, claiming to show Ben his future. However, Ben breaks free, transforms into Diamondhead and fights him off. Later that night, Ben decides to lure Eon into a trap by purposefully leaving himself open, but this backfires and he is captured along with Gwen and Max.

At the Plumber facility storing the Hands of Armageddon, Eon explains that the Omnitrix only allows Ben to remain in his alien forms for ten minutes as a fail-safe, to prevent them from overwhelming his human self and personality with the form's own. He also reveals that he is an evil version of Ben from an alternate timeline, which Max wanted to hide from Ben. Eon deactivates the fail safe, and turns Ben into a mindless, disembodied, amnesiac Chronian under his control, as the Hands must be powered by a young Chronian. Meanwhile, the imprisoned Plumbers, along with Gwen and Max, free themselves, and mount a rescue. While Max tries to sacrifice himself to disable the Hands, Gwen reaches out to Ben in his Chronian form. Ben turns back to normal, and with the help of the other Plumbers, manages to save Max and disable the time rift, sending Eon's race back to their dimension.

The older Eon reappears, angered at Ben's victory. Ben transforms into Wildmutt and fights him off, knocking him into the Hands of Armageddon, destroying both the Hands and Eon. Gwen takes Wildmutt to a talent show that the school is having, where they perform a magic trick and win second place. After the show, Grandpa Max recommends that it is time to give the Omnitrix a rest for a while and he, Ben and Gwen go for pizza. Ben admits that he will miss it. Suddenly, in space, an alien armada assembles, hinting that Max and Ben's longtime arch-enemy Vilgax has returned.

== Cast ==
- Graham Phillips as Ben Tennyson
- Christien Anholt as Eon and Ben Eon
- Haley Ramm as Gwen Tennyson
- Robert Picardo as Principal White
- Lee Majors as Max Tennyson
- Beth Littleford as Sandra Tennyson
- Don McManus as Carl Tennyson
- Sab Shimono as Old Man Hubbard
- Aloma Wright as Mrs. Dalton
- Tyler Patrick Jones as Cash Murray
- Tyler Foden as J.T.
- Paige Hurd as Stephanie
- Bianca Ruiz Brocki as Candace
- David Franklin as Heatblast (voice)
- Carlos Alazraqui as Grey Matter (voice)
- Daran Norris as Diamondhead (voice)
- Dee Bradley Baker as Wildmutt (voice)
- Jeff Jensen as Mr. Hawkins the Postman
- Michael Runyard as Fire Chief Whittington
- Alex Winter as Constantine Jacobs

== Production ==
Ben 10: Race Against Time featured CGI effects and characters, including four of the aliens from the TV series: Diamondhead, Grey Matter, Heatblast and Wildmutt. Winter stated at the 2007 upfront presentation that he wanted Ben 10: Race Against Time "to look like X-Men," an epic adventure that is "more cinematic than cartoony" and appeal to all ages. Winter also promised the film will feature "no Jar Jar." In a behind-the-scenes video played on Cartoon Network's video service, Winter describes the film as "everything you've ever seen in Ben 10 come to life." It was filmed using Panavision Remote Systems.

== Reception ==
The film received generally positive reviews from critics. Brian Lowry of Variety called the film "breezy, brisk, and surprisingly fun", and complimented the film's "clever casting". Emily Ashby of Common Sense Media awarded the film 3 out of 5 stars, whilst David Cornelius of DVD Talk called the film "thrilling" and "energetic".

== Accolades ==
Ben 10: Race Against Time was nominated at the 2008 VES Awards for both Outstanding Visual Effects in a Broadcast Miniseries, Movie or Special and Outstanding Performance by an Animated Character in a Live Action Broadcast Program, Commercial, or Music Video.

== Sequel ==
A sequel, titled Ben 10: Alien Swarm premiered on Cartoon Network on November 25, 2009, taking place during Ben 10: Alien Force.
