= Ben 10 (2016 TV series) =

American animated television series

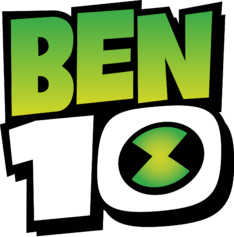
- Genre: Action-adventure; Comedy-drama; Science fantasy; Science fiction comedy; Superhero
- Created by: Man of Action
- Based on: Ben 10 by Man of Action
- Voices of: Tara Strong; Montserrat Hernandez; David Kaye
- Theme music composer: Andy Sturmer
- Composer: Kevin Manthei
- Country of origin: United States
- Original language: English
- No. of seasons: 4
- No. of episodes: 166 (list of episodes)

Production
- Executive producers: Man of Action; John Fang; Jennifer Pelphrey; Tramm Wigzell; Brian A. Miller; Rob Sorcher; Sam Register
- Producer: Shareena Carlson (S1–3)
- Running time: 11 minutes 22–55 minutes (specials)
- Production companies: Man of Action Entertainment; Cartoon Network Studios

Original release
- Network: Cartoon Network
- Release: October 1, 2016 – April 11, 2021

Related
- Ben 10: Omniverse; Ben 10 (2005)

Ben 10 is an American animated television series that serves as a reboot of the 2005 Cartoon Network series of the same name created by Man of Action. The series is served as a parallel world, and unlike previous Ben 10 shows, it is set in a different continuity. The series premiered in Australia, New Zealand and Asia-Pacific on October 1, 2016, in the United Kingdom on October 8, 2016, and in the United States on April 10, 2017, before concluding on April 11, 2021, after four seasons, a film, and three specials, the latter featuring a crossover with Generator Rex and previous Ben 10 television series continuity, via the concept of the multiverse.

== Plot ==
Building on the highly successful franchise about kid hero Ben Tennyson, Ben 10 introduces a re-imagined Ben, his cousin Gwen, and Grandpa Max, as they travel the country during summer vacation. When Ben finds the Omnitrix, a mysterious watch that transforms him into 10 different aliens, a world of extraterrestrial superpowers opens up to him. The series is produced by Cartoon Network Studios and created and executive produced by Man of Action Entertainment (Big Hero 6, Generator Rex and the original four Ben 10 shows in their shared continuity), with John Fang (Mixels, Generator Rex) on board as supervising producer.

Premise

Ten-year-old Ben Tennyson has spent his summer vacation traveling across the country with his cousin Gwen and Grandpa Max, in an RV nicknamed the Rustbucket. However, after coming across a strange high-tech watch known as the Omnitrix, which enables him to transform into 10 alien heroes, he finds himself in the position of a superhero. At each place his family stops, Ben goes from trying to find a source of entertainment to doing battle against supervillains such as the mad scientist Dr. Animo, the dark sorcerer Hex, the psychotic clown Zombozo, the technology-loathing Steam Smythe, the emotionless Weatherheads, amongst other threats both big and small. Despite having lots to learn, he hones his hero skills with Gwen and Max's help.

== Episodes ==
Season	Episodes	Originally released	
Season	Episodes	First released	Last released
1	40	October 1, 2016	May 27, 2017
2	40	October 3, 2017	October 26, 2018
3	52	January 26, 2019	November 30, 2019
4	34	December 13, 2019	September 18, 2020

== Characters ==
=== Main ===
Ben Tennyson as he appears in the series

- Ben Tennyson (voiced by Tara Strong) – The ten-year-old cousin of Gwen Tennyson and grandson of Max Tennyson. He wields the Omnitrix, a watch-like device which can turn him into ten extraterrestrial creatures. Strong reprises her role from the original series.
- Gwen Tennyson (voiced by Montserrat Hernandez) – Ben's cousin of the same age, though relatively older by 7 seconds, who uses her resourcefulness, keen intellect, and cunning to help in stopping villains. She has yet to develop and utilize her strong innate magical/mystical abilities.
- Max Tennyson (voiced by David Kaye) – Ben and Gwen's paternal grandfather.

=== Supporting ===
- Kevin Levin (voiced by Greg Cipes) – Ben's former school bully and the wielder of an Omnitrix derivative called the Antitrix, which allows him to turn into genetically altered versions of Ben's aliens, plus an eleventh alien named Bashmouth. He becomes a reluctant ally on occasion following the last episodes of Season 3. As noted by Forever Knight and Charmcaster, he secretly harbors a crush on Gwen and has concerns for her safety. Cipes reprises his role from Alien Force, Ultimate Alien, and Omniverse.
- Phil Billings (voiced by John DiMaggio) – An old friend of Max and the inventor of the Omni-Copter who first appears in "Omni-Tricked".
- Glitch (voiced by Tara Strong) – A fusion of Ben and Upgrade's DNA accidentally created when Ben upgraded the Omnitrix using Upgrade in "Omni-Tricked". He originally maintained the Omnitrix from within before being freed in "Innervasion". In seasons 3 and 4, Glitch exclusively appears in the form of an enhanced Rustbuggy. In Ben 10 Versus the Universe: The Movie, Glitch's Rustbuggy form is destroyed by Vilgax though he survives by reformatting himself into experimental battle armor used by Kevin. Despite the armor being damaged, Phil believes he can salvage Glitch.
- Azmuth (voiced by David Kaye) – An elderly Galvan and the creator of the Omnitrix who was imprisoned by Vilgax in a parallel dimension known as the Null Void until he manages to get out in the events of Ben 10 Versus the Universe.
- Grand Magistrate (voiced by Roger Craig Smith) – The leader of a race of frog-like aliens known as the Incurseans and a court judge who appears in Ben 10 Versus the Universe.
  - Incursean Officer (voiced by Dee Bradley Baker) – An Incursean official under Grand Magistrate' command who appears in Ben 10 Versus the Universe.
- Ben 10,000 (voiced by Fred Tatasciore) – An adult version of Ben from a future who recruits the ten-year-old Ben to save the world from the Xerge in Ben 10,010.
  - President Gwen (voiced by Montserrat Hernandez) – An adult version of Gwen from Ben 10,000's timeline and the president of the US who appears in Ben 10,010. Her inner circle consists of A.I. Max and older, reformed versions of Hex, Zombozo, Steam Smythe, Dr. Animo, Maurice, Sydney, Polar, Solar, and Kevin.
  - A.I. Max (voiced by David Kaye) – A hologram version of Max from Ben 10,000's timeline and President Gwen's second-in-command who appears in Ben 10,010.
  - Hitch (voiced by Tara Strong) – An android version of Glitch from Ben 10,000's timeline who appears in Ben 10,010.
- Alternate Max – An alternate version of Max who visits Ben's dimension to help fight off Alien X in Alien X-Tinction.
- Alternate Bens (10-year-old kid versions voiced by Tara Strong, 15-year-old and 16-year-old teenage versions voiced by Yuri Lowenthal) – Alternate versions of Ben from various other timelines dimensions who appear in Alien X-Tinction. Four notable versions come from timelines based on past series in the franchise.
- Gwen 10 – An version of Gwen from a parallel timeline dimension where she obtains the Omnitrix rather than Ben who visits Ben's dimension to help fight off Alien X in Alien X-Tinction.

=== Omnitrix aliens ===
- Four Arms (voiced by John DiMaggio) – A Tetramand, a red four-armed humanoid from the desert planet Khoros whose main ability is superhuman strength.
  - Future Four Arms (voiced by Fred Tatasciore) – An alternate version of Four Arms with darker red skin and a mustache used by Ben 10,000.
- Heatblast (voiced by Daryl Sabara) – A Pyronite, a magma-based humanoid from the star Pyros whose main ability is pyrokinesis.
  - Future Heatblast (voiced by Fred Tatasciore) – An alternate version of Heatblast with miniature volcanoes on his shoulders used by Ben 10,000.
- XLR8 (voiced by Josh Keaton) – A Kineceleran, a blue-and-black humanoid velociraptor-like humanoid from the stormy planet Kinet whose main ability is superhuman speed.
- Diamondhead (voiced by Roger Craig Smith) – A Petrosapien, a humanoid made of teal crystal from the crystal planet Petropia whose main ability is generating crystal projectiles and structures.
- Cannonbolt (voiced by Travis Willingham) – An Arburian Pelarota, an armored pillbug-like humanoid from the beachy planet Arburia whose main ability is superhuman strength and rolling into a sphere.
- Upgrade (voiced by David Sobolov) – A Galvanic Mechamorph, a purple techno-organic blob-like humanoid from the moon Galvan B whose main ability is technological possession.
- Grey Matter (voiced by Todd Haberkorn) – A Galvan, a small grey frog-like humanoid from the planet Galvan Prime whose main ability is his high intelligence.
- Overflow (voiced by Max Mittelman) – A Cascan, an armored water-based humanoid from the ocean planet Cascareau whose main ability is hydrokinesis.
- Wildvine (voiced by David Hornsby) – A Florauna, a plant-based humanoid from the planet Flors Verdance whose main ability is chlorokinesis.
- Stinkfly (voiced by Greg Cipes) – A Lepidopterran, a humanoid blue dragonfly-like humanoid from the swamp planet Lepidopterra whose main abilities are flight and shooting goo from his shoulders.
- Gax (voiced by Yuri Lowenthal) – A Chimera Sui Generis, a green squid-like humanoid from the planet Vilgaxia whose main abilities are laser vision, superhuman strength and prehensile tentacle-like arms.
- Shock Rock (voiced by David Kaye) – A Fulmini, a stone-armored energy being from the magnetic rock-like planet Fulmas whose main ability is manipulating blue electrical energy called Omni-Enhanced energy. He first appears in season 2, replacing Upgrade.
- Slapback (voiced by Todd Haberkorn) – An Ekoleptoid, a toad-like humanoid from the city-like planet Ekoplekton whose main abilities are his self-duplication and density alteration. He first appears in season 3, replacing Grey Matter.
- Rath (voiced by Dee Bradley Baker) – An Appoplexian, a tiger-like humanoid from the jungle planet Appoplexia whose main abilities are wrist claws, superhuman strength and extreme rage. He first appears in season 2, being used by Animo, though Ben gains access to him in season 3, replacing Overflow.
- Humungousaur (voiced by David Kaye) – A Vaxasaurian, a dinosaur-like humanoid from the Earth-like jungle planet Terradino whose main abilities are massive size, superhuman strength and tail mace. He first appears in season 3, replacing Wildvine.
- Jetray (voiced by Dee Bradley Baker) – An Aerophibian, a red manta ray-like humanoid from the ocean planet Aeropela whose main abilities are flight, laser vision and tail, and adaptability to any environment. He first appears in season 4, replacing Stinkfly.
- Goop (voiced by Dee Bradley Baker) – A Polymorph, a slime-like humanoid puppeteered by an Anti-Gravity Projector from the planet Viscosia whose main abilities are indestructibility and shapeshifting. He first appears in Ben 10 Versus the Universe: The Movie.
- Way Big (voiced by Roger Craig Smith) – A To'kustar, a massive, muscular alien born in a cosmic storm whose main abilities are superhuman strength, stamina, and the ability to fire cosmic rays by crossing his arms in an "X" shape. He first appears in Ben 10 Versus the Universe, being temporarily available to Ben so could fight Alien V. He serves as Ben's biggest and most powerful alien form.
- Spidermonkey (voiced by Dee Bradley Baker) – An Arachnichimp, a blue four-armed primate-like humanoid from the jungle planet Aranhaschimmia whose main abilities are superhuman agility and shooting webbing from his tail. He first appears in Ben 10,010 and is exclusive to Ben 10,000.
- Buzzshock (voiced by Tara Strong) – A Nosedeenian, a small black-and-white anthropomorphic battery from the Nosedeen Quasar whose main abilities are electrokinesis and possessing machinery. He first appears in Ben 10,010 and is exclusive to Ben 10,000.
- Surge (voiced by Fred Tatasciore) – A Xerge, a small purple X-shaped alien from an unknown planet whose main abilities are levitation and a connection to his races' hive mind. He first appears in Ben 10,010.
  - Future Surge (voiced by Fred Tatasciore) – An alternate version of Surge with a black body used by Ben 10,000.
- Chromastone (voiced by Dee Bradley Baker) – A Crystalsapien, a humanoid alien made of purple stone and magenta crystal from the planet Petropia (Diamondhead's planet) whose main abilities are energy absorption and firing beams of a multi-colored ultraviolet energy. He first appears in Alien X-Tinction and is exclusive to Alien Force Ben.
- Big Chill (voiced by Dee Bradley Baker) – A Necrofriggian, a black and blue moth/butterfly-like humanoid from the ice planet Kylmyys whose main abilities are flight, cryokinesis, and intangibility. He first appears in Alien X-Tinction and is exclusive to Alien Force Ben.
- AmpFibian (voiced by Dee Bradley Baker) – An Amperi, a blue and white jellyfish-like humanoid from the gas planet Tesslos whose main abilities are electrokinesis, flexibility, and adaptability to any environment. He first appears in Alien X-Tinction and is exclusive to Ultimate Alien Ben.
- Ripjaws (voiced by Montserrat Hernandez) – A Piscciss Volann, a sea monster-like humanoid with the characteristics of an anglerfish, a piranha and a shark from the artificial ocean planet Piscciss whose main abilities are breathing underwater and possessing sharp teeth and claws. She first appears in Alien X-Tinction and is exclusive to Gwen 10.
- Bloxx (voiced by David Kaye) – A Segmentasapien, a gorilla-like humanoid made of red, yellow, and blue building blocks from the "ghost planet" Polyominus whose main abilities are morphing his body into various shapes using his segments and shooting pieces of himself out of guns formed from his arms dubbed Bloxx-Lobbers. He first appears in Alien X-tinction and is exclusive to Omniverse Ben.

=== Villains ===
- Vilgax (voiced by Yuri Lowenthal) – A Chimera Sui Generis warlord and conqueror who tries to take the Omnitrix from Ben to take over the universe, but ends up stranded on Earth after his defeat by Ben in "Omni-Tricked", and later trapped in the Null Void in "Innervasion" by the High Override. He later escapes from the Null Void and attacks the Earth In Ben 10 vs. The Universe: The Movie, which he is revealed to have helped create the Omnitrix with Azmuth and manipulated Kevin into creating the Antitrix. He is eventually defeated by Way Big and taken into galactic custody by Azmuth. Lowenthal previously voiced Ben Tennyson himself in Ben 10: Alien Force, Ben 10: Ultimate Alien and Ben 10: Omniverse.
- The High Override (voiced by Fred Tatasciore) – The villainous emperor of the Fulmini (Shock Rock's species) who first appears in the season 2 finale "Innervasion", before being defeated by Team Tennyson and sent in the Null Void.
- The Forever Knight (voiced by Roger Craig Smith) – A mysterious armored knight who plots to alter the course of history and remove the presence of aliens from Earth. Over the course of Season 3, he recruits enemies of Team Tennyson to join his cause, including Kevin, Charmcaster, Billy Billions, Vin Ethanol, Simon Sez, and a delusional Ben. He is trapped across time by a redeemed Kevin as of "Roundabout", though his helmet escapes and gains sentience before finally being defeated and captured in "Cosplay Day".
- Xerge (voiced by Fred Tatasciore) – A race of small purple X-shaped aliens (Surge's race) who invade a future version of Earth before being defeated by Surge and his future self in Ben 10,010.
- Maurice (voiced by John DiMaggio) – A human-headed cockroach who loves money and filth.
  - Sydney (voiced by Travis Willingham) – A cockroach-headed human who is Maurice's henchman.
- Steam Smythe (voiced by Roger Craig Smith) – A Victorian-themed man with a British accent who dislikes various elements of modern-day life, and often uses steampunk gadgets to attack.
- Hex (voiced by Robin Atkin Downes) – A powerful sorcerer who desires world domination. He wields a group of magical artifacts called the Charms of Bezel and a purple-and-gold-striped spellbook, the latter of which eventually falls into Charmcaster's possession.
- Doctor Animo (voiced by Dwight Schultz) – A mad scientist who desires to turn the world into a new age of evolution with his mind-controlled mutant animals.
- Zombozo (voiced by John DiMaggio) – An evil clown who commonly uses mind tricks and hypnotism for his schemes.
  - Frightwig (voiced by Jessica DiCicco) – A 10-year-old girl and circus freak with prehensile red hair and enhanced agility.
  - Acid Breath (voiced by Josh Keaton) – A circus freak who can generate acid.
  - Thumbskull (voiced by John DiMaggio) – A bald-headed muscular man with super strength and a nail-like growth on his head.
- Lagrange (voiced by David Kaye) – An illegal racer with a heavy French accent who is typically seen driving a red race car. He first appears in "Drive You Crazy."
- Charmcaster (voiced by Tara Strong) – Gwen's arch-rival and an apprentice magician who, unlike her original counterpart, is portrayed as a regular human carrying a spell book instead of a sorceress from another dimension.
- Billy Billions (voiced by Gunnar Sizemore) – A rich kid who loves to get his way. His weapons usually involve an assortment of high-tech robots.
- Solar and Polar Twain (voiced by Todd Haberkorn and Tom Kenny) – Twin scientists who never get along with each other. Their plans for world domination usually have them plan to split it 50/50.
- Michael Morningstar (voiced by Drake Bell in "Bright Lights, Black Hearts", and Yuri Lowenthal in "The Charm Offensive") – A teen actor from Gwen's favorite TV series, the "Un-Alivers", who turns out to be a vampire that feeds on the life force of his followers. In "The Charm Offensive", Charmcaster imprisons him in her spellbook as punishment for exploiting her.
- Xingo (voiced by Tom Kenny) – An anthropomorphic purple fox who is Ben's favorite cartoon character and is not bound to normal physics.
- Lord Decibel (voiced by David Kaye) – A sadistic DJ who can control sound and music.
- The Weatherheads — A group of emotionless alien robots who can manipulate various aspects of weather. In season 4, Sunny terminates the male Weatherheads after they fail her for the last time.
  - Gust-O (voiced by Eric Bauza in season 1, and Jeff Bennett in seasons 2 through 4) — The leader of the trio, who wears a light blue tie and can manipulate wind.
  - Shock-O (voiced by David Kaye in Season 1, and Jeff Bennett in seasons 2 through 4) — The tallest and thinnest member of the group, who wears a yellow tie and can manipulate electricity.
  - Hail-O (voiced by Jeff Bennett) — The shortest and stumpiest of the trio, who wears a blue tie and can manipulate ice.
  - Sunny (voiced by Tara Strong) — The Weatherhead Trio's female superior, who can manipulate fire and seems to display more emotion than the three male Weatherheads combined.
- Null Void Inmates – Alien criminals imprisoned in the Null Void.
  - Ectonurite Prisoner (voiced by Yuri Lowenthal) – An Ectonurite, a ghost-like alien from the perpetually dark planet Anur Phaetos.
  - Opticoid Prisoner (voiced by Dee Bradley Baker) – An Opticoid, a bat-like humanoid with multiple eyes on his upper torso from the gelatinous planet Sightra.
  - Piscciss Volann Prisoner (voiced by David Kaye) – A Null Void inmate of the same species as Ripjaws.
  - Vulpimancer Prisoner (vocal effects provided by Daryl Sabara) – A Vulpimancer, an orange sightless dog-like alien from the pitch-black planet Vulpin.
  - Loboan Prisoner (vocal effects provided by John DiMaggio) – A Loboan, a werewolf-like alien from the moon Luna Lobo.

==== Antitrix aliens ====
Unlike the Omnitrix aliens they are modeled after, the Antitrix aliens are all voiced by Greg Cipes. Alien V and Anti-Vilgax are voiced by Yuri Lowenthal.

- Quad Smack – Kevin's version of Four Arms, who is colored purple and has spiked red and black armor.
- Hot Shot – Kevin's version of Heatblast, who is significantly larger and has an olive green chest.
- Rush – Kevin's version of XLR8, who is colored green and has grayish-green armor.
- Crystalfist – Kevin's version of Diamondhead, who is made of purple crystal rather than teal.
- Wreckingbolt – Kevin's version of Cannonbolt, who has spiked armor plating.
- Bootleg – Kevin's version of Upgrade, who is colored blue and has a red eye and spiked armor.
- Dark Matter – Kevin's version of Grey Matter, who is significantly larger and can create fire with crystallizing properties.
- Undertow – Kevin's version of Overflow, who is bulkier and can generate green slime instead of water.
- Thornblade – Kevin's version of Wildvine, who has two thorny vines on his back instead of seeds.
- Skunkmoth – Kevin's version of Stinkfly, who is significantly larger and colored red with golden armor.
- Bashmouth – A wolf-like alien that seems to be Kevin's version of Rath, being able to generate metal.
- Anti-Vilgax- A fusion of all of Kevin's aliens in Vilgax's body.
- Alien V – A stronger version of Vilgax fused with Celestialsapien DNA, whose body is black with red outlines.
- Humungoraptor – Kevin's version of Humungousaur, who is red and Tyrannosaurus-like with golden armor on his arms. This alien is exclusive to Future Kevin.

== Voice cast ==
=== Main ===
- Tara Strong as Ben, Glitch, Original Series Ben, Buzzshock, Charmcaster, Sally, Mrs. Billions, Upgrade (Gwen version), Amalgam Ben, Starshine, I.J. Crowling, Esther, Molecular Chef, Mary Jo Fourfeathers
- Yuri Lowenthal as Vilgax, Ben Prime (Teen), Alien Force Ben, Ultimate Alien Ben, Omniverse Ben, Elderly Ben, Gax, Michael Morningstar (second appearance), Ectonurite Prisoner
- Montserrat Hernandez as Gwen, President Gwen, Ripjaws
- David Kaye as Grandpa Max, Shock Rock, Humungousaur, Azmuth, Alternate Max, Bloxx, Shock-O (first appearance), Lagrange, Steve Lester, Mr. Billions, Melvin, Lord Decibel, Karl, Piscciss Volann Prisoner, A.I. Max
- John DiMaggio as Four Arms, Zombozo, Maurice, Thumbskull, Phil, Magg-O-Net Monster, Glamour Man, Harry, Loboan Prisoner, Secretary Zombozo, Future Maurice, Bobo Haha
- Daryl Sabara as Heatblast, Vulpimancer Prisoner, Rex Salazar
- Josh Keaton as XLR8, Acid Breath, SixSix, Shady Looking Dude, Ryan (first appearance)
- Roger Craig Smith as Diamondhead, Way Big, Forever Knight, Steam Smythe, Iron Kyle, Penny, Kyle, Bill, Napoleon (second head), Cash, Dirty Dobs, Gill, Rocky, Sergeant Smythe
- Travis Willingham as Cannonbolt, Sydney, Tim Buktu, Kraab
- Greg Cipes as Stinkfly, Kevin, Quad Smack, Hot Shot, Bashmouth, Wreckingbolt, Thornblade, Undertow, Dark Matter, Crystalfist, Bootleg, Rush, Skunkmoth, Humungoraptor, Goatadactyl, Robot Mannequin, Samurai Chef
- Dee Bradley Baker as Rath, Jetray, Goop, Spidermonkey, Chromastone, Big Chill, AmpFibian, Oliver, Napoleon (first head), Nugget, Slurpstack, Cadobbit, King Koil, Opticoid Prisoner
- Todd Haberkorn as Grey Matter, Slapback, Tetrax, Grey Arms
- Max Mittelman as Overflow, Todd, J.T.
- David Hornsby as Wildvine, Sewer Chef
- David Sobolov as Upgrade, Vin Ethanol

=== Additional voices ===
- Carlos Alazraqui as Chinzilla, Minitaur
- Ogie Banks as Ryan (second appearance), Simon (second appearance)
- Eric Bauza as Gust-O (first appearance)
- Drake Bell as Michael Morningstar (first appearance)
- Jeff Bennett as Hail-O, Shock-O (later appearances), Gust-O (later appearances), Madcow, Wolfen Sheep
- Keith David as Yawk
- Debi Derryberry as Simon (first appearance)
- Jessica DiCicco as Frightwig
- Robin Atkin Downes as Hex, General Hex
- Tom Kenny as Xingo
- Vanessa Marshall as Queen Bee, Woman
- Rob Paulsen as Bruce, Coach Keene
- Dwight Schultz as Dr. Animo, Admiral Animo
- Gunnar Sizemore as Billy Billions
- Cree Summer as Hippie Vendor/Shasta Fay, Captain Betts McCabe
- Fred Tatasciore as the High Override, Hydromanders, Bob, Boblins, Ben 10,000, Four Arms (Ben 10,000 version), Heatblast (Ben 10,000 version), Xerge, Surge
- Anna Vocino as Nanny Nightmare
- Audrey Wasilewski as Maxine
- Kath Soucie as the Malachi Sisters
- Kari Wahlgren as Quinn, the Malachi Sisters, and Lucky Girl (TV Character)

== Production ==
Cartoon Network announced on June 8, 2015, that Ben 10 was to be relaunched with a new revival television series. In June 2016, the network began to release information about the show. Its sneak peek was released at the 2016 SDCC on July 21, 2016. The series had its world premiere on October 1, 2016, in Australia. In March 2017 at the Cartoon Network's 2017 Upfront, it was announced that the series would premiere in the United States on April 10, 2017, and that it would be possible to watch episodes of the series on the Cartoon Network app ahead of its television premiere.

Building on the franchise about the kid hero Ben Tennyson, Ben 10 introduces a re-imagined Ben (in his 10-year-old form), his cousin Gwen, and Grandpa Max, as they travel the country during summer vacation. When Ben finds the Omnitrix, a mysterious watch that transforms him into 10 different aliens, a world of extraterrestrial superpowers opens up to him. Produced by Cartoon Network Studios, the series is created and executively produced by Man of Action, with John Fang on board as supervising producer but also as executive producer. It is animated by Sunmin Image Pictures and Mua Film.

On May 22, 2017, the series was renewed for a second season which premiered on February 19, 2018. On March 8, 2018, the series was renewed for a third season which premiered on February 23, 2019. On January 10, 2019, the series was renewed for a fourth season, which premiered on January 19, 2020.

On February 17, 2021, it was announced there would be three 44-minute specials.

== Ratings ==
Despite receiving generally negative reviews from critics, in the United States, the series has been viewed by 41 million viewers across multiple platforms.

In the EMEA, the series has reached more than 27 million viewers. It reached 1.2 million viewers and 9% of boys on CITV in the UK. It was watched by half of the boys in South Africa, Romania, Spain and Portugal, more than 30% of boys in Hungary, Poland, and Sweden, and has also received high ratings in France and Italy.

== Other media ==
=== Home media ===
Ben 10 (2016) home video releases
Season		Volume no.	Title	Episodes	Total running time (minutes)	Disc(s)	Release date	
Season		Volume no.	Title	Episodes	Total running time (minutes)	Disc(s)	Region 1	Region 4
1	2016–17	The Complete First Season		40	440	3	—N/a	December 13, 2017
1	2016–17	1	Villain Time	20 (1–20)	220	1	February 13, 2018	—N/a
1	2016–17	2	Omni-Tricked	20 (21–40)	220	1	September 18, 2018	—N/a
2	2017–18	3	Out to Launch	18 (41–58)	198	1	February 12, 2019	—N/a
2	2017–18	The Complete Second Season		40	440	3	—N/a	February 20, 2019
—N/a		Ben 10 Versus the Universe: The Movie		6	120	1	October 27, 2020	—N/a

=== Printed media ===
In October 2017, Panini UK partnered with Cartoon Network and launched a magazine for the series with an original 8-page comic strip every month written by Jason Quinn with art by Russ Leach.

=== Toys and merchandise ===
In June 2015, a toy line for the series was announced to be released in the fall of 2017 by Playmates Toys. It was released in the United States at Toys R Us in June 2017 and in all other retailers in August.

In July 2017, toys were released by Playmates Toys, with Flair distributing them in the UK and Giochi Preziosi Group releasing them everywhere else in the EMEA. Cartoon Network has partnered with various licensing partners across the EMEA to release merchandise ranging from apparel to accessories to publishing.

=== Video games ===
A video game based on the series was released worldwide on November 10, 2017 (for Microsoft Windows, Nintendo Switch, PlayStation 4, and Xbox One). It was published by Outright Games and distributed by Bandai Namco Entertainment in the EMEA. In the game, players must help Ben defeat three of his greatest enemies: Zombozo, Queen Bee, and the Weatherheads. On March 3, 2020, it was announced that a second game was in development. The game, titled Ben 10: Power Trip, was released on October 9, 2020.

=== Ben 10 Challenge ===
Ben 10 Challenge is a live-action game show produced by the Spanish production company La Competencia Productions in Madrid for Turner EMEA. It follows two teams of people who compete in challenges and get tested on their Ben 10 knowledge. Versions were created for France, Germany, Italy, the Middle East, Poland, Spain, Turkey, and the UK, with the Spanish version also airing in Portugal dubbed. The English version premiered in the UK and Ireland on October 13, 2017, and in Africa on December 23, 2017.
