= Backup-file Format =

Data archive format

Backup-File Format is a data archive format used by the IBM AIX operating system. It stores copies of files in an analogous manner to the Unix tar format.

BFF files can be created by the AIX "backup" command, and read by the corresponding "restore" command. There is no standard file suffix, although some files use .bff. However, files can be identified programmatically by their "magic number" in the first 4 bytes. This can be either 0x09006bea or 0x09006fea, in big-endian byte order.

The Backup-File Format is also used for AIX software packages.
