= Graham Phillips (actor) =

American actor and singer (born 1993)

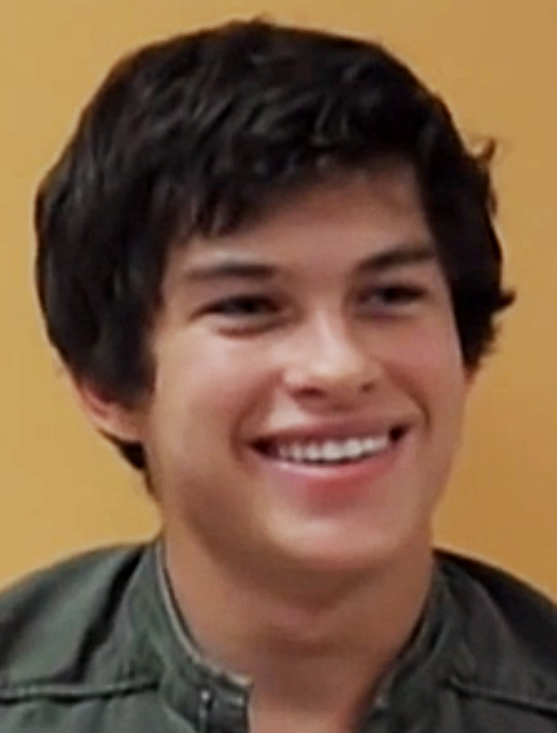
- Phillips in 2011
- Born: Graham David Phillips; April 14, 1993 (age 33); Orange County, California, U.S.
- Education: Princeton University
- Occupations: Actor; singer; filmmaker
- Years active: 2002–present
- Father: Layn R. Phillips

Graham David Phillips (born April 14, 1993) is an American actor, singer, writer and director. Beginning his acting career at the age of nine, Phillips is known for a variety of television, film, and stage roles; as Zach Florrick on the CBS series The Good Wife, Ben Tennyson in the film Ben 10: Race Against Time, and Evan Goldman in the Broadway musical 13, as well as a leading role in the independent film Staten Island Summer. He has also appeared in films such as Blockers and XOXO and in the recurring television roles of Nick St. Clair in Riverdale and Nate in Atypical. He made his feature film directorial debut in 2019 with the neowestern The Bygone, and followed it with the Southern noir thriller Rumble Through the Dark in 2023.

== Personal life ==
Phillips was born on April 14, 1993, in Orange County, California. His father is Layn R. Phillips, an attorney and former U.S. district court judge. He was raised Episcopalian, and during his K-12 school years, attended St. Margaret's Episcopal School in San Juan Capistrano, California. He dated singer Ariana Grande from 2008 to 2011.

Phillips entered Princeton University in the fall of 2012, majoring in history while maintaining his acting career. His undergraduate thesis was on indigenous marginalization and resistance in the U.S. He graduated in 2017.

== Career ==
=== Stage and music ===
Phillips starred as Evan Goldman in the musical comedy 13 on Broadway at the Bernard B. Jacobs Theatre which opened October 5, 2008 and closed January 4, 2009. It was directed by Jeremy Sams, choreographed by Christopher Gattelli, and its music and lyrics were by Jason Robert Brown and book by Dan Elish and Robert Horn.

Prior to his role in 13, Phillips played the title role in The Little Prince with the New York City Opera at Lincoln Center. The New York Times critic called Phillips' performance in the title role "smashing." From there Phillips went directly into the world premiere of An American Tragedy at the Metropolitan Opera where he played the part of Young Clyde, both opening and closing the opera with a solo.

Phillips' other professional stage credits include A Christmas Carol: The Musical performed at Madison Square Garden where he sang the role of Tiny Tim to Jim Dale's Scrooge; The Ten Commandments: The Musical with Val Kilmer at the Kodak Theatre in Los Angeles.

Phillips, at ten years old, was the second youngest person to sing the National Anthem to open a Los Angeles Dodgers baseball game (behind 9-year-old Jessica Tivens in 1990). He has also debuted original songs composed by Martin Charnin and John Kander in New York. He appeared twice on The Today Show as a soloist. Phillips recorded a solo composed by Alan Menken and Stephen Schwartz for the film Noel starring Robin Williams and Susan Sarandon. He also was a soloist on Meat Loaf's 2006 album Bat Out of Hell III: The Monster Is Loose.

Recent stage credits include Nick in Who’s Afraid of Virginia Woolf? at the Geffen Playhouse (2022), starring alongside Zachary Quinto and Calista Flockhart. Phillips then played George in Sunday in the Park with George at Pasadena Playhouse (2023), directed by Sarna Lapine, and reprised the role in a 2024 production at the Axelrod Performing Arts Center, directed by fellow Princetonian and 13: The Musical alum Eamon Foley.

In June 2025, Phillips returned to the New York stage in the Off Broadway revival of Little Shop of Horrors as Seymour Krelborn.

=== Screen acting ===
Phillips had a co-starring role as Jordan Baxter, the middle son, in the feature film Evan Almighty, starring Steve Carell, Morgan Freeman and Lauren Graham, which premiered June 22, 2007. In the fall of 2007 he completed working on the feature film Stolen Lives starring Josh Lucas. Phillips also played the lead role in Ben 10: Race Against Time. His television credits include The Good Wife, Crossing Jordan, Judging Amy, The King of Queens, White Collar, and the Hallmark film Love's Long Journey.

Phillips, along with the rest of the cast of The Good Wife, has received three Screen Actors Guild Award nominations for Outstanding Performance by an Ensemble in a Drama Series. He has also received three Young Artist Award nominations; Best Performance By a Leading Young Actor in a TV Movie, Miniseries or Special for his role in Ben 10: Race Against Time, Best Performance by a Supporting Young Actor in a Feature Film for his role in Evan Almighty, and Best Supporting Young Actor in a TV Series for his role in The Good Wife. He also plays Roger in the go90.com series Guidance.

Phillips played Austin in the 2018 film Blockers. He starred alongside Kathryn Newton.

Phillips played Nick St. Clair in the second season of the teen drama television series Riverdale. In 2019, Phillips played Prince Eric in ABC's The Little Mermaid Live!

In 2023, Phillips provided the voice and motion capture for Harry Osborn in Marvel’s Spider-Man 2. He replaced Scott Porter, who provided the voice for the character in Marvel’s Spider-Man.

He will appear as Matt Petersen in the upcoming Amazon series Scarpetta alongside Nicole Kidman.

=== Directing and production ===
In 2014, Phillips co-founded a small production company Grind Arts Co. with choreographer-actor Eamon Foley. Foley, who co-starred with Phillips in 13, also was attending Princeton. With Grind, Phillips produced and acted in experimental adaptions of Sweeney Todd and The Last Five Years, and directed a short film titled Color + Light. Phillips also directed a Princeton production of the musical Once in 2016.

Since 2014, Phillips has run the independent film production studio Phillips Pictures with his brother Parker Phillips. As a writer-director team – billed as Graham & Parker Phillips – they have worked on a number of projects together. They released the original short film The Mediator in 2015. In 2019, the Phillips brothers made their feature filmmaking debut with The Bygone. The film was distributed by Netflix.

Their most recent effort, Rumble Through the Dark, written by Michael Farris Smith and adapted from his own novel, The Fighter, starred Aaron Eckhart, Bella Thorne and Academy-Award nominee Marianne Jean Baptiste. The project was released theatrically by Lionsgate November 10, 2023, and internationally by Universal Pictures.

== Filmography ==
=== Film ===
Year	Title	Role	Notes
2004	Noel	Boy Soprano	
2006	The Ten Commandments: The Musical	Moses' Son	
2007	Evan Almighty	Jordan Baxter	
2007	Ben 10: Race Against Time	Ben Tennyson	Television film
2009	Stolen Lives	Mark Wakefield	
2011	Goats	Ellis Whitman	
2013	Innocence	Tobey Crawford	
2015	Staten Island Summer	Danny Campbell	
2015	The Mediator	The Boy	Short film; also writer and director
2016	XOXO	Ethan Shaw	
2018	Blockers	Austin	
2019	The Bygone	Kip Summer	Also writer, director and producer
2021	Yes Day	Brian	
2023	Rumble Through the Dark	—N/a	Director and producer
2025	In A Holidaze	Andrew	

=== Television ===
Year	Title	Role	Notes
2002	The King of Queens	Winthrop	Episode: "Mentalo Case"
2004	Judging Amy	Tobie Carroll	Episode: "Legacy"
2006	Crossing Jordan	Jonah Wheeler	Episode: "Mace vs. Scalpel"
2009–2016	The Good Wife	Zach Florrick	Main role (seasons 1–5); recurring role (season 6); guest (season 7)
2012	White Collar	Evan Leary	Episode: "Upper West Side Story"
2016	Secrets and Lies	Liam Connors	3 episodes
2017–2018; 2020–2021	Riverdale	Nick St. Clair	6 episodes
2018–2019	Atypical	Nate	5 episodes
2019	The Little Mermaid Live!	Prince Eric	TV musical
2026	Scarpetta	Matt Petersen	Recurring role

=== Theater ===
Year	Title	Role	Venue / Company	Notes
2002	Alexander and the Terrible, Horrible, No Good, Very Bad Day	Alexander	Laguna Playhouse	
2003	A Christmas Carol	Tiny Tim	Madison Square Garden	
2004	The Ten Commandments	Ensemble	Kodak Theatre	Original production
2005	Pippin	Theo	Reprise! Theatre Company	Reprise! concert performance
2005	The Little Prince	The Little Prince	New York City Opera	
2005	An American Tragedy	Young Clyde	Metropolitan Opera	Original production
2008–2009	13	Evan	Norma Terris Theatre	Pre-Broadway tryout
2008–2009	13	Evan	Bernard B. Jacobs Theatre	Original Broadway production
2017	Once	—N/a	Lewis Center for the Arts	Director; Princeton University production
2022	Who's Afraid of Virginia Woolf?	Nick	Geffen Playhouse	
2023	Sunday in the Park with George	Georges Seurat / George	Pasadena Playhouse	
2024	Sunday in the Park with George	Georges Seurat / George	Axelrod Performing Arts Center	
2025	Little Shop of Horrors	Seymour Krelborn	Westside Theatre	Off-Broadway revival
2026	Rope	Richard Raglan	Theater at St. Clement's	Off-Broadway adaptation

=== Video games ===
Year	Title	Role	Notes
2023	Spider-Man 2	Harry Osborn	Voice; replacing Scott Porter

== Discography ==
Year	Album	Title	Other artist(s)
2006	Bat Out of Hell III: The Monster Is Loose	"Monstro"	Meat Loaf
2006	Bat Out of Hell III: The Monster Is Loose	"Seize the Night"	Meat Loaf
2006	Bat Out of Hell III: The Monster Is Loose	"Cry to Heaven"	Meat Loaf
2008	13 (Original Broadway Cast Recording)	"13/Becoming a Man"	
2008	13 (Original Broadway Cast Recording)	"All Hail the Brain/Terminal Illness"	Aaron Simon Gross, Eric M. Nelsen
2008	13 (Original Broadway Cast Recording)	"Getting Ready"	Ensemble
2008	13 (Original Broadway Cast Recording)	"Being a Geek"	
2008	13 (Original Broadway Cast Recording)	"Tell Her"	Allie Trimm
2008	13 (Original Broadway Cast Recording)	"If That's What It Is"	Aaron Simon Gross, Allie Trimm
2008	13 (Original Broadway Cast Recording)	"A Little More Homework"	Ariana Grande
2008	13 (Original Broadway Cast Recording)	"13" (Single Version)	
2008	13 (Original Broadway Cast Recording)	"Here I Come"	
2011	Non-album track	"Stick Around" (unreleased track)	Ariana Grande
2019	The Little Mermaid Live!	"Fathoms Below"	
2019	The Little Mermaid Live!	"Her Voice"	
2019	The Little Mermaid Live!	"If Only"	Auli'i Cravalho
