= Best friends forever =

Intense friendship

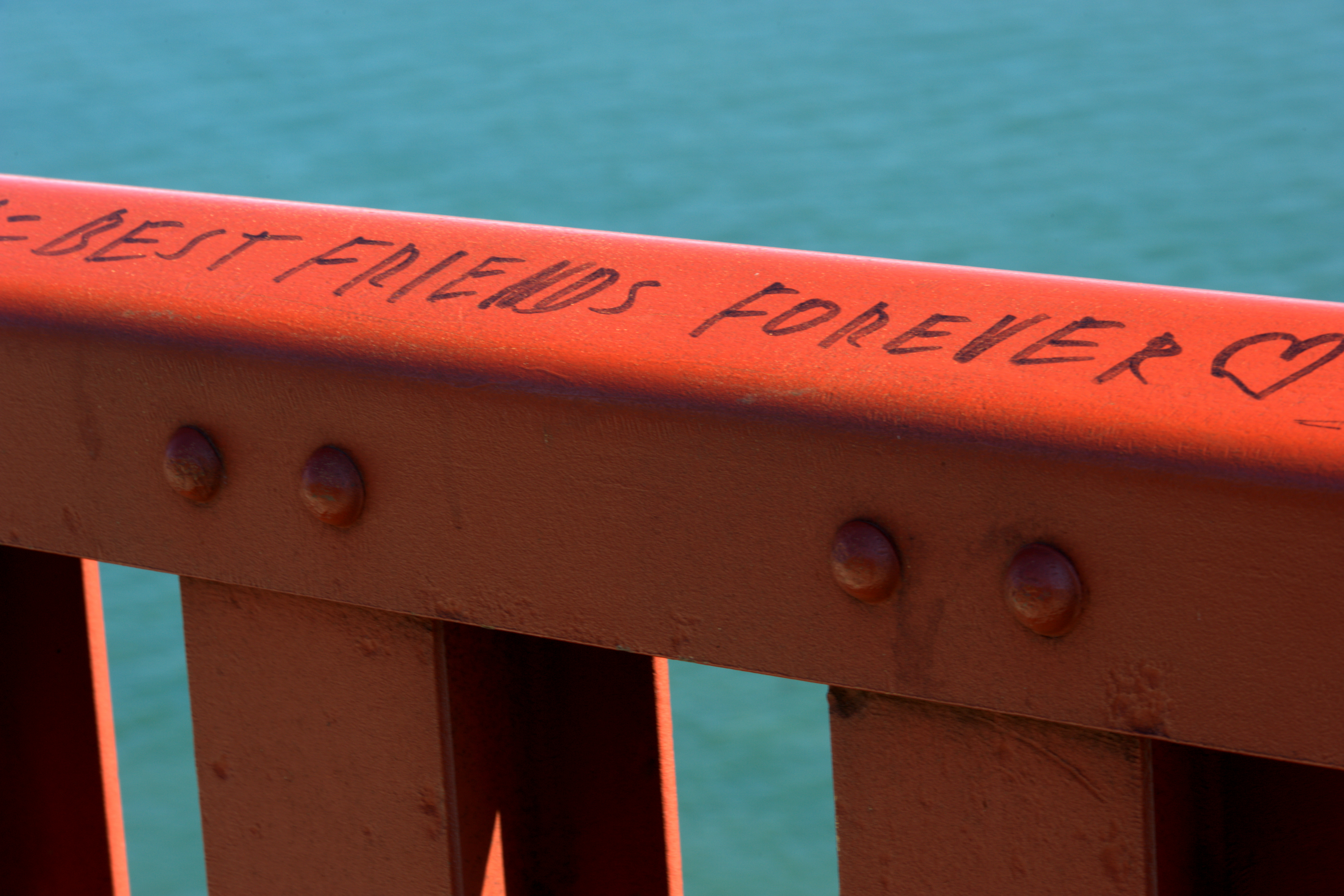
The words "Best Friends Forever" written on the Golden Gate Bridge.

"Best friends forever" is a term that describes a close, mutual friendship between two best friends. It is often written as the initialism BFF.

== Definition ==
The term BFF describes a friendship in which the meaning of that friendship has been changed in the lives of the friends by them. BFFs are common in primary school and secondary school, typically during childhood and adolescence. The chances of a person having BFFs may decline when the friends go to college or higher education. The term BFF does not necessarily convey exclusivity; depending on a person's individual interpretation or philosophy of the concept of "BFF", an individual may not have more than one BFF at the same time unless they are all BFFs in a group.

Barbara Delinsky described a BFF as "someone you don't have to see every day to still connect with, someone who loves you whether you talk often or not, someone who would drop everything and catch the next flight if you needed her. It's someone who couldn't care less where or what she eats, as long as she's with you." According to a survey in France, the BFF friendship is a concept that occupies a certain place on social networks.

== Acronym ==
Although the concept of having or being a "best friend" is ageless, the acronym BFF was popularized as a quick way for friends to sign off and express their friendships while instant-messaging (IM-ing) on the computer or sending a text message on cell phones. The acronym BFF was added to the New Oxford American Dictionary on September 16, 2010. The Oxford English Dictionary documents the earliest written usage of the acronym in the year 1978.

== Academic studies ==
In 2010, the BFF concept was a part of a BFF contract "to encourage the signatories to work through their differences before splitting up."

In a study conducted at the University of Oxford, Tamas David-Barrett and his colleagues reported that there is an unusually large number of profile pictures on Facebook that depict two women. This pattern is present in each region of the world. After eliminating the alternative hypotheses, the study concluded that the finding suggests that (a) close friendship formation patterns are universal among humans, and (b) there is a marked gender difference in the propensity to form lasting friendship due to an evolutionary ultimate cause. This suggests that the BFF concept, albeit with a different name, may exist in many cultures, going back to ancient times. Studies have also shown that close friends are treated as siblings throughout the lifespan.
