= List of Ben 10 television series =

The Ben 10 television series are American animated fictional superhero television series produced by Cartoon Network Studios set in the fictional franchise, Ben 10 conceived by Man of Action, produced by Cartoon Network Studios, and owned by Warner Bros. Entertainment.

As of 2021, the five concluded series are split into two continuities. The classic continuity includes the original series and its sequels–Ben 10 (2005–2008), Ben 10: Alien Force (2008–2010), Ben 10: Ultimate Alien (2010–2012) and Ben 10: Omniverse (2012–2014). The reboot continuity includes the 2016 rebooted series–Ben 10 (2016–2021). The 2021 April specials serve as both the series finale for the 2016 reboot and a crossover event connecting both continuities.

== Series overview ==
Series	Season	Episodes	Originally released	
Series	Season	Episodes	First released	Last released
Ben 10 (2005)	1	13	December 27, 2005	March 25, 2006
Ben 10 (2005)	2	13	May 29, 2006	October 9, 2006
Ben 10 (2005)	3	13	November 25, 2006	April 21, 2007
Ben 10 (2005)	4	10	July 14, 2007	April 15, 2008
Ben 10: Alien Force	1	13	April 18, 2008	August 31, 2008
Ben 10: Alien Force	2	13	October 10, 2008	March 27, 2009
Ben 10: Alien Force	3	20	September 11, 2009	March 26, 2010
Ben 10: Ultimate Alien	1	20	April 23, 2010	December 10, 2010
Ben 10: Ultimate Alien	2	12	February 4, 2011	April 29, 2011
Ben 10: Ultimate Alien	3	20	September 16, 2011	March 31, 2012
Ben 10: Omniverse	1	10	August 1, 2012	November 17, 2012
Ben 10: Omniverse	2	10	November 24, 2012	February 2, 2013
Ben 10: Omniverse	3	10	February 9, 2013	April 6, 2013
Ben 10: Omniverse	4	10	October 5, 2013	December 7, 2013
Ben 10: Omniverse	5	10	February 15, 2014	April 19, 2014
Ben 10: Omniverse	6	10	October 6, 2014	October 17, 2014
Ben 10: Omniverse	7	10	October 20, 2014	October 31, 2014
Ben 10: Omniverse	8	10	November 3, 2014	November 14, 2014
Ben 10 (2016)	1	40	October 1, 2016	November 22, 2017
Ben 10 (2016)	2	40	October 3, 2017	October 26, 2018
Ben 10 (2016)	3	52	January 26, 2019	July 25, 2019
Ben 10 (2016)	4	34	December 13, 2019	September 18, 2020

== Classic continuity ==
=== Ben 10 (2005 TV series) ===
The series centers on Ben Tennyson, a 10-year-old boy on a summer vacation road trip with his cousin Gwen and their grandfather Max, who is later revealed to be a member of a secret intergalactic organization called the Plumbers. On their first night camping in their grandfather's RV, nicknamed the Rust Bucket, Ben finds a mysterious watch-like alien device initially meant for Max, which attaches itself upon his wrist due to him sharing DNA with Max. It gives him the ability to transform into several (initially ten but later more) alien life-forms, each with special abilities. During their vacation, the Tennysons are attacked by various enemies, ranging from aliens such as intergalactic warlord Vilgax, bounty hunter duo SixSix and Kraab, and Ectonurite high king Zs'Skayr, criminals such as 11-year-old energy absorbing delinquent Kevin Levin, mad scientist Doctor Animo, and the mysterious paramilitary organization the Forever Knights, to supernatural entities such as interdimensional sorcerer Hex and his niece Charmcaster, and clown mastermind Zombozo and his Circus Freak Trio.

=== Ben 10: Alien Force ===
The series begins five years after the events of the original series. Ben, now 15-years-old, has removed the Omnitrix and returned to living a normal life, but he is forced to use it again to save his grandfather Max, who has been abducted by a xenophobic alien species called the Highbreed as part of a plot to rid the Earth of human beings. Ben's age causes the Omnitrix to recalibrate, granting him access to new aliens along with a few from the original series. Ben is joined by Gwen and former enemy Kevin Levin as they fight the Highbreed's universal extermination plan.

=== Ben 10: Ultimate Alien ===
After Ben's last battle with Vilgax the previous year, which destroyed the Omnitrix, 16-year-old Ben replaces it with the Ultimatrix, a new watch-like device which allows him to evolve some of his alien forms into their ultimate forms, gaining even stronger abilities. With the recent public reveal of his identity, Ben has become a worldwide celebrity. Meanwhile, he, sixteen-year-old Gwen, and seventeen-year-old Kevin must stop an Osmosian villain named Aggregor, who hunts five elemental aliens from the Andromeda Galaxy and intends to use their respective powers to achieve the "ultimate prize". Later, Ben, Gwen, and Kevin have to prevent an extra and inter-dimensional demonic entity and deity called Dagon from taking over the known universe.

=== Ben 10: Omniverse ===
16-year-old Ben Tennyson acquires the new and perfected Omnitrix, which gives him access to another new set of aliens along with all of the previous ones. After Gwen goes away to college with Kevin accompanying her, Ben pairs up with Rook Blonko, a by-the-book Plumber from the planet Revonnah. He is targeted by an intergalactic huntsman named Khyber, who utilizes a copy of the Omnitrix, the Nemetrix, developed by mad Cerebrocrustacean scientist Dr. Psychobos. (Note: The Nemetrix allows the user to transform into non-sentient predatory aliens, but is incompatible with sentient beings and damages their mind if used by them. The Nemetrix is primarily used by Khyber's hunting dog, who is non-sentient and suffers no ill effects from using the device.) Both of them are working with an enemy from Ben's past, a corrupted Galvanic Mechamorph named Malware. Ben later contends with Vilgax, the Incurseans, Albedo, Zs'Skayr, Psyphon, Charmcaster, the Plumber's Black-Ops Unit (called the "Rooters"), his evil alternate dimension self Mad Ben, and the rogue Chronosapien Maltruant.

== Reboot continuity ==
=== Ben 10 (2016 TV series) ===
The official Twitter feed of Cartoon Network PR confirmed a rebooted series that would return to following the adventures of Ben, Gwen, and Max Tennyson and feature new alien forms. In mid-June 2016, Cartoon Network released the first poster for the series, in which ten of the most popular aliens from the franchise were featured. The series premiered on international Cartoon Networks beginning in October 2016, with Europe, Asia-Pacific, Middle East & African versions, and continued into 2017 with the North and Latin American versions.

The world premiere was on Cartoon Network (Australia and New Zealand), airing on October 1, 2016. The U.K network premiered the series on October 8, 2016. The German Cartoon Network premiered the first two episodes on October 10, 2016. The series premiered in the United States on April 10, 2017.

== Crossovers ==
=== Ben 10 and Generator Rex ===
During Cartoon Network's panel at 2011's San Diego Comic-Con, Ben 10 and Generator Rex creators Man of Action announced a crossover special between the Ben 10 and Generator Rex series titled "Ben 10/Generator Rex: Heroes United". The forty-minute special aired on November 25, 2011, as a Generator Rex episode.

A comic book based on the special titled "Hero Times Two" was released on November 30, 2011, as the 65th issue of DC Comics' Cartoon Network: Action Pack.

A second crossover titled "Ben Gen 10" aired as a part of the fifth and last season of the Ben 10 reboot and featured new versions of several Generator Rex characters in the reboot universe.

=== Ben 10 and The Secret Saturdays ===
All of the characters from The Secret Saturdays except of VV Argost were completely recast in the Ben 10 Omniverse episode "T.G.I.S.", which takes place after the end of The Secret Saturdays. Drew Saturday also appeared in a later episode of Ben 10: Omniverse.

=== "Crossover Nexus" ===
An extended episode of OK K.O.! Let's Be Heroes featured guest appearances from Ben Tennyson from the 2016 Ben 10 reboot, Garnet from Steven Universe, and Raven from Teen Titans Go!, alongside several legacy characters from past Cartoon Network shows.

== See also ==
- List of Ben 10 films
