= Ben 10 =

American animation media franchise

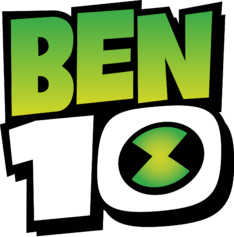
- Logo used for the 2016 series
- Created by: Man of Action
- Original work: Ben 10 (2005–2008)
- Owners: The Cartoon Network, Inc. (Skydance)
- Years: 2005–present

Films and television
- Films: List of films
- Animated series: List of television series
- Television specials: Ben 10/Generator Rex: Heroes United (2011); Ben 10,010 (2021); Ben Gen 10 (2021); Alien X-Tinction (2021)

Games
- Video games: List of video games

Miscellaneous
- Related shows: Generator Rex (2010–2013); The Secret Saturdays (2008–2010)

Ben 10 is an American science fiction superhero media franchise conceived by Man of Action and owned by The Cartoon Network, Inc., division of Skydance. The franchise, mainly consisting of animated series produced by Cartoon Network Studios, revolves around a young boy named Ben Tennyson, who discovers the Omnitrix—a high-tech, extraterrestrial device shaped like a wristwatch. This remarkable gadget contains the DNA of various alien species, allowing Ben to transform into them at will. Initially, the Omnitrix features ten alien transformations (hence the name of the series), but over time, Ben gains the ability to unlock additional species.

The franchise began with an animated series titled Ben 10 (2005–2008), which was followed by its sequels Ben 10: Alien Force (2008–2010), Ben 10: Ultimate Alien (2010–2012), and Ben 10: Omniverse (2012–2014), all sharing the same continuity. The reboot series, also titled Ben 10, was released from 2016 until 2021, set in a new continuity, with a 44-minute finale special serving as a crossover with the first four series. The franchise also includes five films (three animated and two live-action), numerous video games, and crossovers with other two Cartoon Network series, Generator Rex (2010–2013) and The Secret Saturdays (2008–2010). It has garnered considerable critical acclaim, securing three Emmy Awards, and ranks as Cartoon Network's second-longest existing franchise. Furthermore, Ben 10 has inspired a line of toys produced initially by Bandai for the franchise's first four series and later by Playmates Toys for the reboot. Ben 10 is one of Cartoon Network's most commercially successful franchises.

== Television series ==
As of 2024, the five concluded series are split into two continuities: the classic continuity, including the original series and its sequels–Ben 10 (2005–2008), Ben 10: Alien Force (2008–2010), Ben 10: Ultimate Alien (2010–2012), and Ben 10: Omniverse (2012–2014), and the reboot continuity of Ben 10 (2016–2021), with its 2021 April specials serving as both the series finale for the 2016 reboot and a crossover event connecting both continuities. As of 2025, there are a total of 393 episodes.

=== Series overview ===
Series	Season	Episodes	Originally released	
Series	Season	Episodes	First released	Last released
Ben 10 (2005)	1	13	December 27, 2005	March 25, 2006
Ben 10 (2005)	2	13	May 29, 2006	October 9, 2006
Ben 10 (2005)	3	13	November 25, 2006	April 21, 2007
Ben 10 (2005)	4	10	July 14, 2007	April 15, 2008
Ben 10: Alien Force	1	13	April 18, 2008	August 31, 2008
Ben 10: Alien Force	2	13	October 10, 2008	March 27, 2009
Ben 10: Alien Force	3	20	September 11, 2009	March 26, 2010
Ben 10: Ultimate Alien	1	20	April 23, 2010	December 10, 2010
Ben 10: Ultimate Alien	2	12	February 4, 2011	April 29, 2011
Ben 10: Ultimate Alien	3	20	September 16, 2011	March 31, 2012
Ben 10: Omniverse	1	10	August 1, 2012	November 17, 2012
Ben 10: Omniverse	2	10	November 24, 2012	February 2, 2013
Ben 10: Omniverse	3	10	February 9, 2013	April 6, 2013
Ben 10: Omniverse	4	10	October 5, 2013	December 7, 2013
Ben 10: Omniverse	5	10	February 15, 2014	April 19, 2014
Ben 10: Omniverse	6	10	October 6, 2014	October 17, 2014
Ben 10: Omniverse	7	10	October 20, 2014	October 31, 2014
Ben 10: Omniverse	8	10	November 3, 2014	November 14, 2014
Ben 10 (2016)	1	40	October 1, 2016	November 22, 2017
Ben 10 (2016)	2	40	October 3, 2017	October 26, 2018
Ben 10 (2016)	3	52	January 26, 2019	July 25, 2019
Ben 10 (2016)	4	34	December 13, 2019	September 18, 2020

== Films ==
As of 2020, there have been three animated films – Secret of the Omnitrix (2007), Destroy All Aliens (2012), Versus the Universe (2020) and two live-action films – Race Against Time (2007), Alien Swarm (2009) released in the franchise.

=== Animated films ===
Occupation	Secret of the Omnitrix (2007)	Destroy All Aliens (2012)	Versus the Universe (2020)
Director(s)	Sebastian O. Montes III and Scooter Tidwell	Victor Cook	Arthur Henrique Nazareth and John McIntyre
Producer(s)	Donna Smith, Alex Soto & Jennifer Pelphrey (supervising)	Kurt Weldon (line) and Victor Cook (supervising)	Shareena Carlson and Will Patrick
Production company(s)	Cartoon Network Studios	Tiny Island Productions, Cartoon Network Asia and Cartoon Network Studios	Cartoon Network Studios
Distributor	Cartoon Network	Cartoon Network	Warner Bros. Home Entertainment
Runtime	67 minutes	69 minutes	72 minutes
Released	August 10, 2007	March 23, 2012	October 10, 2020

=== Live-action films ===
Occupation	Live-action films	
Occupation	Race Against Time (2007)	Alien Swarm (2009)
Director(s)	Alex Winter	Alex Winter
Producer(s)	Evan W. Adler and Victor Ho (line)	Gideon Amir
Production company(s)	Trouper Productions with Cartoon Network Studios	Trouper Productions with Cartoon Network Studios
Distributor	Warner Bros. and Cartoon Network	Cartoon Network
Runtime	67 minutes	69 minutes
Released	November 21, 2007	November 25, 2009

== Future ==
According to Duncan Rouleau, Cartoon Network has plans they are working on and he hoped that there would be some announcements by the end of 2021, but as of 2025, no announcement has been made so far. The crew was developing many options; the changing fields of platforms from cable to streaming, the consolidation of Warner Bros. franchises, and a "thousand other factors" determined where, how, and when this iteration will finally settle.

== Other media ==
=== Ben 10: Ultimate Challenge ===
Ben 10: Ultimate Challenge is a game show developed for television by United Kingdom-based company Twenty Twenty, which airs on Cartoon Network in the United Kingdom, Spain, France, Italy, Netherlands, Bulgaria, the Nordic region, Hungary, Poland, Germany, Russia, Turkey, Chile, United States and the Middle East. Ultimate Challenge is a trivia show that tasks children with answering questions about all three series. Ultimate Challenge is produced by Mandy Morris and executive produced by Daniel Marlowe.

=== References in other shows ===
- Ben appeared as a parody of Benjamin Franklin on the show MAD, in an episode titled "Ben 10 Franklin". Franklin was flying his kite when he was struck by a lightning bolt, gaining the Omnitrix. He used Swampfire to sign the Declaration of Independence. He also used Humongousaur to defeat the British and smash down a junior high school bully's house in revenge. He used other aliens from Alien Force and Ultimate Alien, where they have his hair and glasses.
- Also in MAD, a reference to Alien Force was made with a parody of the film Cowboys & Aliens, with many titles: "Cowboys & Alien Force", "Cowboys & Equestrians", and "Cowboys & Silly Bands". The reference was made at the beginning when Jake awakes with Ben on his side, but with Jake wearing Ben's pants and hat, with the Omnitrix on his wrist. He also used the Omnitrix to become an alien with the mix of Diamondhead, Chromastone, and Way Big to smash a cowboy.
- In the South Park episode "You're Getting Old", Cartman's mother mentions that Cartman gets upset when he does not get a present every time someone else gets a present at a party. One of the presents Cartman gets is a "Ben 10 Wrist Rocket".
- The Robot Chicken episode "Hurtled from a Helicopter into a Speeding Train" shows Ben on his 14th birthday party, where he complains about his gifts given by Azmuth.
- Ben 10 villains, such as the Enoch, Hex and Animo, make a brief cameo in The Secret Saturdays episode "Van Rook's Apprentice". References to Galvan Prime and Wildvine's species also appear in "Guess Who's Going to Be Dinner?" and "Eterno" respectively.
- In the Peep Show episode, "Man Jam", Jeremy jokingly refers to Ben, the boyfriend of a woman he admires, as "Ben 10" during a phone call to him.
- Teenage Ben Tennyson appeared in The Official BBC Children in Need Medley in 2009.
- Ben Tennyson, sporting his original series design, makes a cameo appearance in the Jellystone! crossover special "Crisis on Infinite Mirths".

=== References in video games ===
- Ben 10 is featured as a crossover character in Brawlhalla, a 2D platform fighting game. He appears as his alien forms Heatblast, Diamondhead, and Four Arms in the form of the crossover "skins" for certain playable characters.
- Ben 10 is featured as a downloadable content (DLC) expansion pack in Minecraft Bedrock Edition. The player teams up with Ben Tennyson, Gwen Tennyson, and Max Tennyson to stop an alien invasion by transforming into various aliens to face off against notable villains from the 2016 iteration of the franchise.
- Ben 10 is featured in Fortnite Battle Royale in the form of purchasable cosmetics, added on April 24, 2026 as part of Chapter 7 Season 2. Ben Tennyson and Gwen Tennyson are available as purchasable "outfits", using their Ultimate Alien appearances.

=== Cartoon Network promotion ===
==== Titanic Kungfubot Offensive ====
The game features famous and notable Cartoon Network characters in robot-type form. Big Chill, Swampfire, a DNAlien, Kevin Levin, Vilgax, Rath, Armodrillo, Ultimate Humongousaur, Ultimate Echo Echo, and Ultimate Big Chill appear as playable characters.

To promote the Ben 10/Generator Rex: Heroes United special, Cartoon Network updated Titanic Kungfubot Offensive, adding new bots based on Shocksquatch and Clockwork.

==== Cartoon Network Universe: FusionFall ====
The character design for Ben Tennyson was changed when the original Ben 10 series ended and was replaced by his Alien Force design. In the game, he serves as a "Guide" offering exclusive missions and items.

==== Cartoon Network Universe: Project Exonaut ====
In another browser-based game entitled Cartoon Network Universe: Project Exonaut, Ben's aliens, alongside Gwen and Vilgax, appear as "exosuits". The exosuits' purpose is protecting the player and giving them unique abilities and powers. The planet Kylmyys (the home planet of one of Ben's aliens, Big Chill) and the Perplexhedron are featured as battle arenas. Ultimate Kevin and Alien X appear as exosuits for Project Exonaut representing Ben 10. The new exosuits feature a Gold version of and Rath.

==== Cartoon Network: Punch Time Explosion ====
Ben appears in the game as a playable character. Swampfire, Humongousaur, Big Chill, and AmpFibian appear as Ben's playable aliens. Vilgax, the archenemy of Ben Tennyson appears as a playable character for the first time. Gwen and the Vreedle Brothers are "summons" in the game. Additionally, Bellwood and the Null Void are included as battle arenas. Kevin also appears as a "summon" in the game, but is featured as a playable character on PlayStation 3, Xbox 360, and Wii versions called Cartoon Network: Punch Time Explosion XL. In addition, Kevin in Ultimate Kevin form appears in the game as a boss. The young version of Ben appears in the console version of the game as a playable character.

== Cast and characters ==
The main characters include Ben Tennyson and his cousin Gwen Tennyson, Grandpa Max Tennyson, Kevin Levin and Rook Blonko, along with the villains Vilgax, Aggregor, Doctor Animo, Eon, Hex and Khyber.

== Accolades ==
=== Original series ===
Year	Award	Category	Recipients and nominees	Result
2007	34th Daytime Emmy Awards	Outstanding Individual in Animation	Thomas Perkins	Won
2007	Golden Reel Award	Best Sound Editing in Sound Effects, Foley, Dialogue, ADR and Music for Television Animation	Otis Van Osten, Melinda Rediger, Trevor Sperry, Matt Brown, Jody Thomas, Andy Sturmer, Ron Salaises, Keith Dickens for the episode "Ben 10,000"	Nominated
2008	35th Daytime Emmy Awards	Outstanding Special Class Animated Program	Brian A. Miller, Sam Register, Jennifer Pelphrey, Alex Soto, Donna Smith, Tramm Wigzell	Nominated

==== Race Against Time ====
Year	Award	Category	Recipients and nominees	Result
2008	29th Young Artist Awards	Best Leading Young Actor	Graham Phillips as Ben Tennyson	Nominated
2008	29th Young Artist Awards	Best Supporting Young Actor	Tyler Patrick Jones as Cash Murray	Nominated
2008	29th Young Artist Awards	Best Supporting Young Actress	Haley Ramm as Gwen Tennyson	Nominated
2008	6th Visual Effects Society Awards	Outstanding Animated Character in a Live Action Broadcast Program or Commercial	Brent Young, Smith, Michael For the Grey Matter sequence	Nominated
2008	6th Visual Effects Society Awards	Outstanding Visual Effects in a Broadcast Miniseries, Movie or Special	Dina Benadon, Evan Jacobs, Brent Young, Chris Christman for visual effects compilation	Nominated

=== Alien Force ===
Year	Award	Category	Recipients and nominees	Result
2009	36th Daytime Emmy Awards	Outstanding Sound Mixing – Live Action and Animation	Robert Hargreaves, Robert Serda and John Hegedes	Won
2009	36th Daytime Emmy Awards	Outstanding Sound Editing – Live Action and Animation	Robert Hargreaves and George Brooks	Nominated
2009	36th Daytime Emmy Awards	Outstanding Special Class Animated Program	Brian A. Miller, Sam Register, Glen Murakami, Jennifer Pelphrey and Donna Smith	Nominated

==== Alien Swarm ====
Year	Award	Category	Recipients and nominees	Result
2010	62nd Primetime Emmy Awards	Outstanding Special Visual Effects for a Miniseries, Movie or a Special	Evan Jacobs, Sean McPherson, Andrew Orloff, Brent Young	Nominated
2010	8th Visual Effects Society Awards	Outstanding Visual Effects in a Broadcast Miniseries, Movie or a Special	Evan Jacobs, Sean McPherson, Andrew Orloff	Nominated
2010	15th Art Directors Guild Award	Television Movie or Mini-Series	Yuda Acco Harry Matheu, Hugh D.G. Moody, Rouzier, Pierre, Robb Bihun, Ann Stacy, Dan Post	Nominated

=== Ultimate Alien ===
Year	Award	Category	Recipients and nominees	Result
2011	64th Writers Guild of America Awards	Animation	Len Uhley for the episode "Moonstruck"	Nominated

=== Omniverse ===
Year	Award	Category	Recipients and nominees	Result
2013	Annie Award	Character Design in an Animated Television/Broadcast Production	Chap Yaep, Steven Choi, Derrick Wyatt for the episode "The More Things Change Part 2"	Nominated
2013	40th Daytime Emmy Awards	Outstanding Sound Mixing – Animation	Carlos Sanches	Won
2013	40th Daytime Emmy Awards	Outstanding Sound Editing – Animation	Jeff Shiffman, Roger Pallan, Matthew Thomas Hall, Otis Van Osten, Tony Ostyn, Gerardo Gonzalez	Nominated

== Outside media ==
=== Merchandise ===
Following the success of the Ben 10 animated TV series and films, various Ben 10 merchandise has been released for general sale. These items include comic books, board games, card games (such as Top Trumps), toys, video games, Lego construction sets, bedding, coloring books, footwear, and watches (the Omnitrix and the Ultimatrix). All four original shows have been released on DVD.

==== Video games ====
The game franchise has many different formats. The video games franchise started in 2006 with the release of Ben 10 for the HyperScan, while the franchise's first official video game Protector of Earth came out in 2007. Twelve games have been released:

Name	Developer	Publisher	Series	Release date	Platforms
Ben 10	HyperScan	Semi Logic Entertainments	Ben 10 (2005)	October 23, 2006	HyperScan only
Ben 10: Protector of Earth	High Voltage Software (PS2, PSP, Wii); 1st Playable Productions (DS)	D3 Publisher	Ben 10 (2005)	October 30, 2007	Nintendo DS, PlayStation 2, PlayStation Portable, Wii
Ben 10: Alien Force	Monkey Bar Games (PS2, PSP, Wii); 1st Playable Productions (DS)	D3 Publisher	Ben 10: Alien Force	October 28, 2008	Nintendo DS, PlayStation 2, PlayStation Portable, Wii
Ben 10 Alien Force: Vilgax Attacks	Papaya Studio (PS2, PSP, Wii, X360); 1st Playable Productions (DS)	D3 Publisher	Ben 10: Alien Force	October 27, 2009	Nintendo DS, PlayStation 2, PlayStation Portable, Wii, Xbox 360
Ben 10 Alien Force: The Rise of Hex	Black Lantern Studios	Konami	Ben 10: Alien Force	May 31, 2010	Wii, Xbox 360
Ben 10 Ultimate Alien: Cosmic Destruction	Papaya Studio (PS2, PS3, PSP, Wii, X360); Griptonite Games (DS)	D3 Publisher (NA) Namco Bandai Games (EU/AUS)	Ben 10: Ultimate Alien	October 5, 2010	Nintendo DS, PlayStation 2, PlayStation 3, PlayStation Portable, Wii, Xbox 360
Ben 10: Galactic Racing	Monkey Bar Games (PS3, Wii, X360, 3DS, PS Vita); Tantalus Media (DS)	D3 Publisher (NA) Namco Bandai Games (EU/AUS)	Ben 10: Ultimate Alien	October 18, 2011	PlayStation 3, Xbox 360, Wii, PlayStation Vita, Nintendo 3DS, Nintendo DS
Ben 10: Omniverse	Vicious Cycle Software (Wii, Wii U, Xbox 360 and PS3); 1st Playable Productions (DS and 3DS)	D3 Publisher (NA) Namco Bandai Games (EU/AUS)	Ben 10: Omniverse	November 13, 2012	PlayStation 3, Xbox 360, Nintendo DS, Nintendo 3DS, Wii, Wii U
Ben 10: Omniverse 2	High Voltage Software (Wii, Wii U, Xbox 360 and PS3); 1st Playable Productions (3DS)	D3 Publisher (NA) Namco Bandai Games (EU/AUS)	Ben 10: Omniverse	November 9, 2013	PlayStation 3, Xbox 360, Nintendo 3DS, Wii, Wii U
Ben 10: All Out Attack!	Massively Mobile, LLC	Cartoon Network	Ben 10 (2005)	November 4, 2008	J2ME
Ben 10 (2017 video game)	Torus Games	Outright Games	Ben 10 (2016)	November 10, 2017	PlayStation 4, Xbox One, Nintendo Switch, Windows PC
Ben 10: Power Trip	PHL Collective	Outright Games	Ben 10 (2016)	October 9, 2020	PlayStation 4, Xbox One, Nintendo Switch, Windows PC
Minecraft (Ben 10: DLC)	Mojang Studios; Blockception Ltd	Xbox Game Studios	Ben 10 (2016)	June 2, 2021	PlayStation 4, Xbox One, Nintendo Switch, Windows PC

==== Toy line ====
Bandai manufactured Ben 10 toys from the first four series, while Playmates Toys has produced toys for the 2016 reboot.

Six construction sets were produced by Lego, depicting Spidermonkey, Humungousaur, Swampfire, Chromastone, Jet Ray, and Big Chill.

The series received three McDonald's Happy Meal promotions internationally, as well as one in America in August 2011. The toys are colored translucent figures of some Omnitrix/Ultimatrix aliens and their Ultimate forms, with a small photo of Ben inside. The Alien Force toys are four rings, each one is an alien (Goop, Jetray, Alien X, Chromastone) with features linked with their powers.

==== Comic books ====
Cartoon Network Action Pack was a 2006–2012 comic book series made by DC Comics which showcased Ben 10 alongside Samurai Jack, Codename: Kids Next Door, The Secret Saturdays, or Generator Rex. Some of the issues were connected with the franchise, while others are non-canon.

In February 2013, IDW Publishing announced a partnership with Cartoon Network to produce comics based on its properties, including Ben 10, which ultimately resulted in a four-issue series published between November 2023 and February 2024, written by Jason Henderson and Gordon Purcell.

===== Dynamite Entertainment series =====
In July 2024, Dynamite Entertainment and Warner Bros. Discovery Global Brands and Experiences announced new comic books featuring Ben 10. The first issue was released on May 6, 2026.
