= List of Ben 10 films =

Films released in the Ben 10 franchise

The Ben 10 films are a series of American animated and live-action, fictional superhero films produced by Cartoon Network Studios as part of the media franchise Ben 10, conceived by Man of Action, produced by Cartoon Network Studios, and owned by Warner Bros. Entertainment.

As of 2020, there have been three animated films – Secret of the Omnitrix (2007), Destroy All Aliens (2012), Versus the Universe (2020) and two live-action films – Race Against Time (2007), Alien Swarm (2009) released in the franchise.

== Animated films ==
Occupation	Animated films		
Occupation	Secret of the Omnitrix (2007)	Destroy All Aliens (2012)	Versus the Universe (2020)
Directors	Sebastian O. Montes III and Scooter Tidwell	Victor Cook	Arthur Henrique Nazareth and John McIntyre
Writers	Thomas Pugsley and Greg Klein	Marty Isenberg	Benjamin Lane, Chelsea McAlarney, Johnny Vu, André LaMilza, John Martinez, Josh Kim, Sarah Visel, Benjamin P. Carow, and Kelly Turnbull
Executive Producers	Sam Register and Brian A. Miller	Mark Eyers, Rick Fernandes, Silas Hickey and Vishnu Athreya	John Fang, Brian A. Miller, Jennifer Pelphrey, Rob Sorcher, and Tramm Wigzell along with the Man Of Action
Producers	Donna Smith, Alex Soto & Jennifer Pelphrey (supervising)	Kurt Weldon (line) and Victor Cook (supervising)	Shareena Carlson and Will Patrick
Editors	Mark T. Collins	Aaron Seelman	—N/a
Composers	Andy Sturmer	Kristopher Carter, Michael McCuistion and Lolita Ritmanis	Kevin Manthei
Production companies	Cartoon Network Studios	Tiny Island Productions, Cartoon Network Asia and Cartoon Network Studios	Cartoon Network Studios
Distributor	Cartoon Network	Cartoon Network	Warner Bros. Home Entertainment
Runtime	67 minutes	69 minutes	72 minutes
Released	August 10, 2007	March 23, 2012	October 10, 2020

=== Ben 10: Secret of the Omnitrix ===
The first animated film titled Ben 10: Secret of the Omnitrix is considered as a three-part episode in its fourth season. During a fight with Dr. Animo, Ben's Omnitrix accidentally sets off its self-destruct mode and Ben has to find the Omnitrix's creator to shut it down and stop the evil Vilgax.

=== Ben 10: Destroy All Aliens ===
The second film is a CGI movie titled Ben 10: Destroy All Aliens announced in mid-2011, and released on March 11, 2012 (Asia/Philippines) and on March 23, 2012 (US). This film had previously been under the working title Ben 10: Alien Dimensions. The film was based on the original series and featured the original voice cast. The CGI was animation was handled by Tiny Island Productions.

=== Ben 10 Versus the Universe: The Movie ===
The third animated film titled Ben 10 Versus the Universe: The Movie was announced by Cartoon Network on February 19, 2020, and released on October 10, 2020. This film is based on the reboot of the show.

== Live-action films ==
Occupation	Live-action films	
Occupation	Race Against Time (2007)	Alien Swarm (2009)
Directors	Alex Winter	Alex Winter
Writers	Thomas Pugsley and Greg Klein	John Turman and James Krieg
Executive Producers	Alex Winter, Ramsey Ann Naito, Sam Register and Tramm Wigzell	Alex Winter
Producers	Evan W. Adler and Victor Ho (line)	Gideon Amir
Cinematographers	Morgan Pierre Susser	Anghel Decca
Editors	Suzanne Hines	Scott Richter
Composers	Andy Sturmer	Michael Wandmacher
Production companies	Trouper Productions with Cartoon Network Studios	Trouper Productions with Cartoon Network Studios
Distributor	Warner Bros. and Cartoon Network	Cartoon Network
Runtime	67 minutes	69 minutes
Released	November 21, 2007	November 25, 2009

=== Ben 10: Race Against Time ===
The first live-action film titled Ben 10: Race Against Time, was aired November 21, 2007. It revolves around Ben, Gwen, and Grandpa Max (in another dimension) returning to their hometown of Bellwood and attempting to adjust to being "normal" again. Unfortunately, their lives are once again disrupted by a mysterious alien known as Eon. It premiered on Cartoon Network on November 21, 2007. The film was directed by Alex Winter. The film was nominated for two Visual Effects Society Awards: Outstanding Visual Effects in a Broadcast Miniseries, Movie or Special – Dina Benadon, Evan Jacobs, Brent Young, Chris Christman; and Outstanding Animated Character in a Live Action Broadcast Program or Commercial – Brent Young, Michael Smith.

=== Ben 10: Alien Swarm ===
The second live-action film titled Ben 10: Alien Swarm was aired November 25, 2009. In the movie, the group stumbles upon a hive of alien nanobots who are controlled by a single consciousness and are using humans as host bodies to take over the world. Ben and his friends work together to stop them. This movie is also when Ben unlocks Nanomech.

== Cancelled films ==
=== Race Against Time Sequel ===
At Cartoon Network's 2008 Upfront presentation, the network announced plans for a sequel to the film. However, it was eventually reworked into what is now Ben 10: Alien Swarm.

=== Alien Swarm Trilogy ===
Ben 10: Alien Swarm was initially planned to be the first installment in a trilogy of films centered around the character. Actor Ryan Kelley, who portrayed Ben Tennyson in the film, mentioned in a 2021 interview that he was asked to return for two more potential sequels. However, these sequels were never produced. The decline in live-action programming on Cartoon Network, particularly after the cancellation of the CN Real block in early 2010, led the network to distance itself from further live-action projects, effectively halting the development of additional Ben 10 live-action films.

=== Live-action theatrical film ===
On June 14, 2011, producer Joel Silver announced that he, along with Warner Bros. and Dark Castle Entertainment, would be working on a live-action theatrical film based on Ben 10. In January 2012, Albert Torres was announced as screenwriter. In February 2013, Ryan Engle was announced to work on Torres' script, with Andrew Rona, Steve Richards, and Joel Silver serving as producers. Alex Heineman and Sarah Meyer also joined the project as executive producers. On September 16, 2024, it was revealed that the film was officially canceled after years of development hell, and the rights to a theatrical release had expired.

== See also ==
- List of Ben 10 television series
