= Fight at the Museum =

Fight at the Museum may refer to:

- "Fight at the Museum" (Ben 10: Omniverse), 2014 episode
- "Fight at the Museum" (Amphibia), 2021 episode
