= Ben 10: Protector of Earth =

2007 video game

- North American Wii box art
- Developers: High Voltage Software (Wii, PS2, and PSP), 1st Playable Productions (DS)
- Publisher: D3 Publisher
- Producer: Joshua VanVeld
- Designer: Steve Caywood
- Programmer: Jerome Haraganis
- Artist: Dave Leung
- Series: Ben 10
- Engine: Quantum3
- Platforms: Nintendo DS, PlayStation 2, PlayStation Portable, Wii
- Release: PSP, PS2, NDS: NA: October 30, 2007; EU: November 9, 2007; AU: November 9, 2007; Wii: NA: October 30, 2007; EU: November 30, 2007; AU: December 4, 2007
- Genres: Action-adventure, Beat 'em up, platform
- Modes: Single-player, Multiplayer

Ben 10: Protector of Earth is an action-adventure video game developed by High Voltage Software and published by D3 Publisher and is based on the animated television series Ben 10. This is the second Ben 10 game following the HyperScan game, is the first official game in the franchise, and it was released for the PlayStation 2, PlayStation Portable, the Nintendo DS and the Nintendo Wii in late 2007.

== Gameplay ==
The player controls Ben Tennyson and helps him to travel to five regions across the United States, in order to recover all the Omnitrix's DNA samples stolen by Vilgax, who wants to use it to destroy the world. The gameplay consists of solving puzzles and defeating waves of enemies. Ben also has the access to his Omnitrix, which allows him to transform into different alien forms with specific abilities. At the beginning of the game, Ben is only able to access a few of his alien forms for a limited time, but after defeating a boss, Ben can access a new alien form (Four Arms, Heatblast, XLR8, Cannonbolt, and Wildvine) and unlocks the Master Control allowing him to stay in alien-form for an infinite amount of time, or switch between aliens without draining Omnitrix energy. Attack combos can be unlocked by collecting Omnitrix points. Limited power boosts or invincibility can be gathered, as well as bonuses to make the Omnitrix recharge faster. Three Sumo Slammer cards are hidden in each main level, and unlock features such as movie clips.

After each level, "plumber ranks" are rewarded depending on how fast the player beat the level. If the player gets an A rank, they get a "character view", usually of a boss or a villain. In the main boss levels, a quick time event allows players to execute a special attack at certain points.

== Version differences ==
The Wii, PlayStation 2, and PlayStation Portable versions, developed by High Voltage Software, are largely identical to each other. A second player can join in co-op mode. The Wii version utilizes motion controls, such as flicks of the Wii Remote and Nunchuk to perform attacks, and pointing the Wii Remote at on-screen targets to execute quick-time events.

Unlike the other three versions, the Nintendo DS version is a side-scrolling, 2.5D beat 'em up, in which players can use the touchscreen to operate the Omnitrix, switching between available forms.

== Plot ==
At the Grand Canyon in Arizona, a mosquito-like drone sucks most of the DNA out of Ben's Omnitrix while he is sleeping. The next morning, a giant object crashes into the mountains and Ben finds out he cannot transform into any of his aliens except for Four Arms and Heatblast. After fighting through multiple drones, he defeats a Giant Mech Drone and finds an Omnitrix Crystal which gives him access to XLR8.

Later, the Tennysons go to Mesa Verde and find Vilgax's drones and the Forever Knights fighting. After defeating the knights and drones, a Forever Knight tells them that Enoch has used Area 51's technology to make a battle robot to fight Ben. They go to Area 51 in Nevada and fight Enoch, but he recovers and flees inside his robot. After defeating Enoch's battle robot at the Hoover Dam, Ben finds another Omnitrix Crystal which regains access to Cannonbolt.

When the Tennysons head to San Francisco, California for a vacation, they find out that Kevin Levin and some plant creatures have escaped from the Null Void. He kidnaps Grandpa Max, but later gets sucked to the Null Void again by Ben at a lumber mill in Oregon. After fighting through Crater Lake, they head to the Space Needle in Seattle, Washington where the mother plant has made its home and infecting the city. After defeating it, Ben finds an Omnitrix Crystal which gives him access to Wildvine.

In outer space, Vilgax and Ghostfreak work together to recover the Omnitrix. Ben, Gwen, and Grandpa Max head to Effigy Mounds in Iowa for camping, and find some of Zs'Skayr's troops hunting. After defeating Hex, they discover that Zs'Skayr had plundered the Plumber Base in Mount Rushmore. Ben chases him through Chicago, Illinois and then defeats him in the Gold Coast Theater and Max sucks him into the Null Void.

After defeating Zs'Skayr, they go to the Historic Battlefield in Louisiana where Dr. Animo kidnaps Gwen. They go to the Bayou and discover Clancy in an abandoned mansion. After Ben defeats Clancy, he tells him that Animo is planning to turn Gwen into a mutant. Ben and Max travel to New Orleans and take a boat to Animo's oil refinery. After defeating Animo, Gwen tells them that Animo and Vilgax plan to suck Earth into the Null Void, Ben then unlocks Master Control in the Omnitrix.

After going to a Null Void portal-filled Washington DC, Ben defeats SixSix and his Detrovite troops in Cape Canaveral, Florida. Max uses rockets found there to make the Rustbucket capable of flight. Then, they fly to Vilgax's ship and Ben tries to defeat Vilgax. After a battle that ends with Vilgax's defeat, Ben discovers that the rest of the last Omnitrix Crystals are on the ship. After he retrieves them, the ship starts powering down and projects a Null Void portal, which then sucks in Vilgax and his ship. Ben, Gwen, and Max escape in time and return to their vacation.

== Reception ==
Ben 10: Protector of Earth

Aggregate score
Aggregator	Score
Metacritic	(PSP) 60/100 (WII) 63/100

Review scores
Publication	Score
Eurogamer	5/10
GamesRadar+	3.5/5
GameZone	6.7/10
IGN	7.8/10
Pocket Gamer	2.5/5

Critical reception has been mainly average. IGN scored the Wii, PlayStation 2 and PlayStation Portable versions a 6.8 out of 10, commenting that the cel-shaded graphics, simple gameplay and on-the-fly saving suits the target demographic but was unable to recommend it for hardcore gamers. Lucas M. Thomas scored the Nintendo DS version one point higher, praising its gameplay and sound.

Eurogamer gave the Wii, PlayStation 2 and PlayStation Portable versions 5 out of 10, highlighting the drop-in drop-out two player mode and decent cutscenes, but criticising the bland environments.

=== Sales ===
The game sold more than 2.5 million units worldwide by November 2008.
