= List of Ben 10: Omniverse episodes =

Ben 10: Omniverse is an American animated television series and the fourth installment of the Ben 10 franchise, which aired on Cartoon Network from August 1, 2012, to November 14, 2014, in the United States. Man of Action Studios, consisting of Duncan Rouleau, Joe Casey, Joe Kelly, and Steven T. Seagle, created the franchise.

Each Ben 10: Omniverse episode is about 22 minutes in length, with two-part episodes (such as the series premiere "The More Things Change", "Showdown", "The Frogs of War", "Weapon XI" and "It's a Mad, Mad, Mad Ben World") being about 44 minutes combined in length. Only forty episodes were ordered at first, but on August 25, 2012, production of episode 41 began, with 20 more episodes being ordered, bringing the total up to 60. However, it was expanded to 80 in June 2013.

Instead of a season-based episode release structure, the 80 episodes have been broken into eight story arcs consisting of 10 episodes each. The series has 2 Cartoon Network Studios logos across the 80 episodes, the 2010 logo for episodes from story arcs 1–4, and the 2013 logo for story arcs 5–8. The episodes aired out of the intended production order. The table below shows the broadcast order of the episodes.

== Series overview ==
Story arc	Name	Episodes	Originally released	
Story arc	Name	Episodes	First released	Last released
Arc 1	A New Beginning	10	August 1, 2012	November 17, 2012
Arc 2	Malware's Revenge	10	November 24, 2012	February 2, 2013
Arc 3	Incursean Invasion	10	February 9, 2013	April 6, 2013
Arc 4	Duel of the Duplicates	10	October 5, 2013	December 7, 2013
Arc 5	Galactic Monsters	10	February 15, 2014	April 19, 2014
Arc 6	The Evil Rooters	10	October 6, 2014	October 17, 2014
Arc 7	The Mad Nightmare	10	October 20, 2014	October 31, 2014
Arc 8	The Time War	10	November 3, 2014	November 14, 2014

== Episodes ==
=== Story Arc 1: A New Beginning (2012) ===
No. overall	No. in story arc	Title	Directed by	Written by	Original release date	Prod. code	Viewers (millions)
1	1	"The More Things Change, Part 1"	Dan Riba	Charlotte Fullerton; Dwayne McDuffie and Charlotte Fullerton (story)	August 1, 2012	101	1.544
11-year-old Ben Tennyson faces off with the red Galvanic Mechamorph, Malware. Five years later, Kevin and Gwen leave when Gwen takes early enrollment in an Ivy League college, and Kevin moves to be near her. Ben is forced to fight crime alone, but Grandpa Max (Magister Tennyson – the commander of the Earth-base's Plumbers) gives him a new partner, rookie Plumber Rook Blonko. Ben and Rook end up in their first team-up when Mr. Baumann's store is targeted for destruction by three alien criminals (Bubble Helmet, Fistina, and Liam), while an intergalactic hunter named Khyber watches Ben from the shadows.: Omnitrix aliens used: Four Arms (11-year-old), Feedback (11-year-old), Lodestar, Spidermonkey, Cannonbolt (16-year-old), Bloxx (16-year-old); Nemetrix aliens used: Crabdozer
2	2	"The More Things Change, Part 2"	Jae Hong Kim	Matt Wayne; Dwayne McDuffie and Matt Wayne (story)	September 22, 2012	102	N/A
After stopping Bubble Helmet, Fistina, and Liam from destroying Mr. Baumann's store, Ben and Rook discover an underground alien city named Undertown where they discover that Psyphon is behind the protection racket. At the same time, Khyber sends his pet in the form of Buglizard to hunt Ben.: Omnitrix aliens used: NRG, Water Hazard, Terraspin, Armodrillo, Shocksquatch; Nemetrix aliens used: Buglizard
3	3	"A Jolt from the Past"	Christopher Berkeley	Eugene Son	September 29, 2012	103	1.615
The Megawhatts that Ben fought in his youth come back, seeking his help due to being used as a power source for the villain Fistrick.: Omnitrix aliens used: Stinkfly (11-year-old), Heatblast (16-year-old), Clockwork (16-year-old), Gravattack
4	4	"Trouble Helix"	Dan Riba	Geoffrey Thorne	October 6, 2012	106	1.623
Infiltrating the Plumbers' base, Khyber downloads footage of young Ben's encounter with a corrupted Mechamorph named Malware. This shows Malware's origins and Ben's first encounter with him when he attacks Galvan Prime.: Omnitrix aliens used: Chromastone, XLR8 (11-year-old), Heatblast (11-year-old), Cannonbolt (11-year-old), Diamondhead (11-year-old)
5	5	"Have I Got a Deal for You"	Jae Hong Kim	Len Wein	October 13, 2012	108	1.685
Ben meets an alien con artist named Professor Blarney T. Hokestar whose miracle elixir is extracted from a small alien called a Screegit in his lab. When a Florauna activist named Pax convinces Ben to help him free the small alien from Hokestar's lab, chaos ensues when the nitrogen in Earth's atmosphere turns the Screegit into a giant, acid-spitting monster.: Omnitrix aliens used: Ampfibian, Swampfire, Wildmutt (16-year-old), Juryrigg, Grey Matter (16-year-old), Nanomech
6	6	"It Was Them"	Christopher Berkeley	David McDermott	October 20, 2012	105	1.481
Dr. Animo has escaped his Plumber prison, and Ben and Rook must track him down before he transforms the world into a mutant ant farm.: Omnitrix aliens used: Diamondhead (16-year-old), Echo Echo, Rath, Crashhopper; Nemetrix aliens used: Slamworm, Mucilator
7	7	"So Long, and Thanks for All the Smoothies!"	Dan Riba	Len Uhley	October 27, 2012	104	1.415
Argit and the Vreedle Brothers are fighting for possession of a doomsday device called the Annihilarg. The device then activates and destroys the universe, but Ben uses Alien X's abilities to recreate the universe, albeit with some minor differences.: Omnitrix aliens used: Alien X
8	8	"Hot Stretch"	Jae Hong Kim	Stan Berkowitz	November 3, 2012	107	1.592
Ben and Rook come across elastic, hot-blooded aliens that plan to activate a volcano with a nuclear bomb engine. Ben later falls for a female alien named Ester.: Omnitrix aliens used: Eatle, XLR8, Arctiguana
9	9	"Of Predators and Prey, Part 1"	Chris Berkeley	Kevin Rubio	November 10, 2012	109	1.436
In flashbacks, it is revealed that after a fight with 11-year-old Ben, Malware allied with Dr. Psychobos to create a knockoff of the Omnitrix called the Nemetrix to defeat Psychobos's rival Azmuth and prove that Cerebrocrustaceans are smarter than the Galvans. In the present, after a heated argument, Ben and Rook go their separate ways, giving Khyber his best chance to capture Ben. After a long battle, Ben is forcibly changed back into his human form and supposedly falls unconscious.: Omnitrix aliens used: Stinkfly (16-year-old), Ball Weevil (16-year-old); Nemetrix aliens used: Terroranchula
10	10	"Of Predators and Prey, Part 2"	Dan Riba	Marty Isenberg	November 17, 2012	110	1.739
Khyber tells Ben that he needs different alien DNA to complete the Nemetrix. He also reveals that Dr. Psychobos assigned him to hunt down various species for DNA to transfer it to the Nemetrix and also tells Ben that the reason Dr. Psychobos is creating an evil Omnitrix is because of the orders from Malware. After Ben breaks free, a brawl breaks out leaving Khyber the victor. Rook breaks in and saves Ben and the duo then reveals to Khyber that they orchestrated the whole "fight" at Undertown and Ben only let Khyber capture him so he can lead them to his ship. Ben and Rook accidentally crash Khyber's ship eliminating the DNA to complete the Nemetrix. Khyber and his dog emerge unharmed as Malware and Dr. Psychobos arrive.: Omnitrix aliens used: Humungousaur, Big Chill (16-year-old); Nemetrix aliens used: Tyrannopede

=== Story Arc 2: Malware's Revenge (2012–13) ===
No. overall	No. in story arc	Title	Directed by	Written by	Original release date	Prod. code	Viewers (millions)
11	1	"Outbreak"	Dan Riba	Geoffrey Thorne	November 24, 2012	203	1.475
While Khyber struggles to control his dog's transformations, Dr. Psychobos tells Malware that he will need a part of the Omnitrix to fix it. This causes Dr. Psychobos to infiltrate the Plumber's base on Earth and steal a part from Ben's Omnitrix, causing it to malfunction. The malfunctioning of the Omnitrix causes its powers to leak into Psyphon, Bubble Helmet, Fistina, and Liam, giving them abilities similar to the Omnitrix aliens.: Omnitrix alien debuts: Wildvine (16-year-old), Walkatrout, Pesky Dust, Mole-Stache, The Worst, Kickin Hawk
12	2	"Many Happy Returns"	Jae Hong Kim	Jonathan Callan	December 1, 2012	201	1.384
Gwen and Kevin pay Ben a surprise visit, while a Tetramand princess and her father's fleet of warships threaten the Earth.: Omnitrix alien debuts: Four Arms (16-year-old)
13	3	"Gone Fishin'"	Chris Berkeley	Tom Minton	December 8, 2012	202	1.386
Magister Patelliday is captured by pirates. Hence it is Ben, Rook and Grandpa Max to save Patelliday.: Omnitrix alien debuts: Ripjaws
14	4	"Blukic & Driba Go to Mr. Smoothy's"	Jae Hong Kim	Eugene Son	December 15, 2012	204	1.650
Ben and Rook must stop Trumbipulor from gaining absolute power. Meanwhile, Blukic and Driba set out to find a Mr. Smoothy's after seeing an advertisement for their new grasshopper smoothies and have many misadventures along the way with one of them tying into fighting Trumbipulor's robotic rats.: Omnitrix alien debuts: Way Big (16-year-old), Goop
15	5	"Malefactor"	Chris Berkeley	David McDermott	December 22, 2012	205	1.509
Ben and Rook are attacked by Khyber and his dog at the Old Bellwood Days Festival. In a flashback, it is also revealed how Malware obtained his current mutated form.: Omnitrix alien debuts: Brainstorm; Nemetrix alien debuts: Hypnotick
16	6	"Arrested Development"	Jae Hong Kim	Len Uhley	January 5, 2013	207	1.540
An old rival of Ben Tennyson named Billy Billions turns Ben and Rook into kids again while bringing Dimension 12 robots to Earth and controlling them.: Omnitrix alien debuts: Ball Weevil (11-year-old), Bloxx (11-year-old)
17	7	"Bros in Space"	Dan Riba	Richard Pursel	January 12, 2013	206	1.455
Ben and Rook visit Rook's family during the Amber Ogia harvest, while Fistrick trains the planet's local rodents called the Muroids, to steal the Amber Ogia as fuel for his planet-destroying satellite.
18	8	"Ben Again (Note: This episode was produced as part of the third story arc.)"	Chris Berkeley and John Fang	David McDermott	January 19, 2013	305	2.034
Eon returns and switches Ben's mind with his younger self as part of a plot to take over the timelines. It's up to Professor Paradox, and the two Gwens from the past and present, to help the Bens regain their rightful minds and help to defeat Eon.: Omnitrix alien debuts: Ditto (11-year-old), Wildvine (11-year-old), Clockwork (11-year-old)
19	9	"Store 23"	Jae Hong Kim	Matt Wayne	January 26, 2013	303	1.746
Ben takes Blukic and Driba to look for the 23rd Mr. Smoothy restaurant. After Ben, Blukic, and Driba enter the 23rd Mr. Smoothy restaurant, they find it run by Professor Blarney T. Hokestar who is using a dimensional device to move the restaurant to different dimensions and make more money. In one dimension, Ben meets an alternate version of himself called Ben 23 who is very rich, names his aliens differently, and has lost his beloved Grandpa Max, which lead to him exploiting his heroism for fame and fortune.: Omnitrix alien debuts: Feedback (16-year-old), Murk Upchuck; Hero Watch alien debuts: Freezelizard, Rollaway, Electricyeti; Note: This episode chronologically takes place after "Showdown".
20	10	"Special Delivery"	Dan Riba	Eugene Son	February 2, 2013	306	1.654
After Ben accidentally destroys Mr. Baumann's car during his fight with Psyphon's minion, Thunderpig, Mr. Baumann orders Ben to make deliveries for him without using the Omnitrix. When Ben unknowingly gets the Dwarf Star (a massive power source that was going to be sold at Psyphon's auction) in his possession, Ben must fight off Pysphon, Fistina, Zombozo, Trumbipulor, the Vreedle Brothers, Fistrick, Vulkanus, Sunder, and Seebik to keep them from getting absolute power.: Omnitrix alien debuts: Way Big (11-year-old), Big Chill (15-year-old), Toepick

=== Story Arc 3: Incursean Invasion (2013) ===
No. overall	No. in story arc	Title	Directed by	Written by	Original release date	Prod. code	
21	1	"Showdown, Part 1 (Note: This episode was produced as part of the second story arc.)"	Dan Riba	Marty Isenberg	February 9, 2013	209	1.793
The Faction infiltrates a Galvan museum and try to take Azmuth, but instead teleport Ben and Rook to the museum. Khyber and Dr. Psychobos have a fight and Zed turns into Vicetopus and takes Dr. Psychobos. Ben reveals that when he was 11, he had a battle with Malware and he took Feedback out from the Omnitrix and killed him. Angered, Ben puts his Omnitrix into Malware and he seemingly perished from the overload. Khyber takes the Nemetrix from Zed and mysteriously escapes. The group arrests Dr. Psychobos, who warns Azmuth that the planet and his species are about to become extinct. Galvan Prime's moon, Galvan B, explodes with everyone shocked and surprised.: Nemetrix alien debuts: Omnivoracious, Vicetopus
22	2	"Showdown, Part 2"	Jae Hong Kim	David McDermott; Charlotte Fullerton and Kevin Rubio (story)	February 16, 2013	210	1.779
Galvan Prime's ecosystem is engulfed by Malware and Galvan Prime is destroyed. A gigantic Malware then accumulates on the surface of Galvan. Ben is absorbed into Malware and confronts his 11-year-old counterpart. They both forgive each other for the incident with Malware and 16-year-old Ben regains Feedback. There is a shower of Mechamorphs leading to Malware becoming its original size. Malware is finally defeated and destroyed by Feedback, and Kevin ends up adopting Khyber's dog.: Note: This episode chronologically takes place before "Store 23".
23	3	"Tummy Trouble"	Dan Riba	Jonathan Callan	February 23, 2013	302	1.684
The Gourmand Queen is captured by Incurseans, forcing Ben and Rook to rally her feuding subjects to save her.: Omnitrix alien debuts: Perk Upchuck (16-year-old)
24	4	"Vilgax Must Croak"	Dan Riba	Len Uhley	March 2, 2013	304	1.587
Ben and Rook escort Vilgax to a maximum-security prison planet, but the Incurseans have other plans.
25	5	"While You Were Away"	John Fang	Amy Wolfram	March 9, 2013	308	1.713
Princess Attea springs Dr. Psychobos from prison to help her invade Revonnah.: Omnitrix alien debuts: Astrodactyl
26	6	"The Frogs of War, Part 1"	Dan Riba	Marty Isenberg	March 16, 2013	309	1.680
The Incurseans take control of Earth, so Rook and the Plumbers must stop them, while Ben is somehow missing.: Omnitrix alien debuts: Snare-oh
27	7	"The Frogs of War, Part 2"	Jae Hong Kim	Len Uhley	March 16, 2013	310	1.680
Ben, Rook, Gwen, and Kevin must find a solution to stop the Incurseans once and for all.: Omnitrix alien debuts: Bullfrag
28	8	"Rules of Engagement"	Chris Berkeley	Len Wein	March 23, 2013	208	1.291
Princess Looma attacks Ester's village, forcing Ben, Rook, Fistina and Julie to stop her. In the meantime, Ben is shocked as Julie has gotten a new boyfriend.
29	9	"Rad"	Jae Hong Kim	Geoffrey Thorne	March 30, 2013	307	1.374
With Plumber agents trapped in Incursean territory, Ben and Rook must employ the services of Rad Dudesman, the roughest, toughest smuggler in the galaxy.: Omnitrix alien debuts: Eye Guy (16-year-old)
30	10	"Evil's Encore (Note: This episode was produced as part of the fourth story arc.)"	Jae Hong Kim	Thomas Pugsley	April 6, 2013	405	1.370
Dr. Animo remembers the time he had taken control of the Plumbers Headquarters inside Mount Rushmore, planning to mutate everyone on Earth into grotesque, monstrous creatures resembling him. Hence tries again in the plumber HQ.: Omnitrix alien debuts: Eye Guy (11-year-old), Wildmutt (11-year-old), Perk Upchuck (11-year-old)

=== Story Arc 4: Duel of the Duplicates (2013) ===
No. overall	No. in story arc	Title	Directed by	Written by	Original release date	Prod. code	Viewers (millions)
31	1	"T.G.I.S."	Chris Berkeley	Joelle Sellner	October 5, 2013	301	0.988
The Secret Saturdays come to Bellwood to investigate a rash of chupacabra attacks. Ben and Rook assist, finding the chupacabras have been draining aliens of their lifeforce. They soon discover that the chupacabras are being controlled by Dr. Animo, who is an old business associate of V.V. Argost. Using the alien lifeforce, Animo successfully revives Argost in a mismatched hybrid body. Now Ben, Rook, and the Saturdays must work together to turn the tables on the alliance of Dr. Animo and V.V. Argost when they plan to make an army of "Franken-Cryptids".: Note: The events of the crossover special takes place after the final episode of The Secret Saturdays.
32	2	"Food Around the Corner"	John Fang	Eugene Son	October 12, 2013	401	1.155
Ben as Gravattack attempts to moderate a peace treaty between the Lewodans and the Appoplexians, but must endure the attacks of tiny alien fleas which have inhabited his body. Rook shrinks down in attempt to get the fleas off him before the peace treaty is ruined. But it turns out that the Lewodon named Poltroon, sent the fleas onto Gravattack to destroy his core, causing a meltdown in attempt to destroy both the Lewodons and the Appoplexians, therefore causing a war between the two species and taking power to destroy his enemies. Now Rook must find a way to change Ben back before they are destroyed and to stop Poltroon.
33	3	"O Mother, Where Art Thou?"	Dan Riba	Dean Stefan	October 19, 2013	403	1.243
Octagon and Rhomboid Vreedle decide to prove themselves to Ma Vreedle by pulling off successful crimes; to ensure success in numbers, they take a Pretty Boy Vreedle to assist them under the belief that Ma won't notice one out of the several others missing. When Ma does discover this, she threatens to blow up the sun if the Plumbers don't find Pretty Boy. Meanwhile Ben tries to hide from his mom so he won't get seconds on the dinner that he hates.: Omnitrix alien debuts: Ditto (16-year-old)
34	4	"Return to Forever"	Jae Hong Kim	Len Uhley	October 26, 2013	406	1.412
The Forever Knights are back, and plan to erase all alien DNA on Earth with Will Harangue's help. After the Forever Knights are taken care of, Ben might have a fitting punishment in mind for Harangue and turn him into an alien Ben as Juryrigg.
35	5	"Mud Is Thicker Than Water"	John Fang	Eugene Son	November 2, 2013	407	1.227
While Rook and Kevin are at an auto show, Ben, Gwen, and cousin Lucy try to find out how Psyphon's thugs are getting Level 7 Plumber technology. Gwen suspects that Lucy is the mole because of her shapeshifting abilities as a Sludgepuppy and love of tricks when she was younger, but it turns out that it is an old enemy: Gorvan.
36	6	"OTTO Motives"	Dan Riba	David McDermott	November 9, 2013	408	1.484
While attending an intergalactic auto show on Khoros, Kevin, Rook and Argit run into OTTO, an old enemy of Kevin and Argit that stranded them alone in the Null Void. But OTTO and Violet Offenders end up stealing some of the most expensive cars, and OTTO turns into a giant robot, leaving Ben having to stop him.: Omnitrix alien debuts: Upgrade (16-year-old)
37	7	"The Ultimate Heist"	Dan Riba	David McDermott	November 16, 2013	402	1.522
Albedo (disguised as Ben) seeks a device that will finally change him back into his Galvan form. Meanwhile, Ben (disguised as Albedo by Khyber) is locked in Plumber HQ prison. It reveals Khyber has disguised Ben and Albedo as each other for their plan to work. Meanwhile Argit opens claims to be the hero of Undertown after stopping the Way Bads in "The Frogs of War".: Ultimatrix alien debuts: Ultimate Humungousaur, Ultimate Echo Echo, Ultimate Spidermonkey, Ultimate Albedo
38	8	"A Fistful of Brains"	Jae Hong Kim	Charlotte Fullerton	November 23, 2013	409	1.414
After Ben falls for Albedo's trap, Grandpa Max and Rook search all over the galaxy looking for Ben. Meanwhile he has been secretly trapped on Khyber's hidden personal hunting preserve fighting Khyber's new pet called Panuncian that now wears the Nemetrix. But as Ben finds a way out, he has to deal with Albedo. When Grandpa Max and Rook arrive, they find that Albedo and Khyber have Azmuth as their captive.: Nemetrix alien debuts: Panuncian
39	9	"For a Few Brains More"	John Fang	Matt Wayne	November 30, 2013	410	1.222
Albedo took out Azmuth's brain through his cerebral vortex. With assistance from Gwen and Kevin, Ben, Rook, Max and Azmuth and the Plumbers must find a way off Khyber's Place, to get back to Earth and stop Albedo and Khyber from taking over the galaxy by absorbing Azmuth's brain at Billion's Tower.: Omnitrix alien debuts: Atomix; Ultimatrix alien debuts: Ultimate Arctiguana, Ultimate Gravattack; Nemetrix alien debuts: Ultimate Panuncian
40	10	"Max's Monster"	John Fang	Len Wein	December 7, 2013	404	1.387
Ben, Rook, and Max have their hands full when Phil returns as a human-Terroranchula hybrid as a side effect of using the Nemetrix five years ago, and starts absorbing all of the electricity in Bellwood. But when he heads into Undertown's mini power-plant and starts to absorb the Megawatts, they must find a way to stop him.: Omnitrix alien debuts: Frankenstrike, Buzzshock

=== Story Arc 5: Galactic Monsters (2014) ===
No. overall	No. in story arc	Title	Directed by	Written by	Original release date	Prod. code	Viewers (millions)
41	1	"Something Zombozo This Way Comes"	Dan Riba	Charlotte Fullerton	February 15, 2014	501	1.207
Ben and Rook investigate a circus, which Ben decides to stay out of while Rook enjoys the show; however, he comes out looking like a clown. Ben gets him to Plumber HQ, suspecting that Zombozo is up to his old tricks; however, Zombozo has escaped his cell and the number of zombie clowns is growing. Now Ben must try to overcome his fear of clowns to save the people of Bellwood.
42	2	"Mystery, Incorporeal"	Jae Hong Kim	Matt Wayne	February 22, 2014	502	1.108
After Gwen as Lucky Girl beats Punchinello, Ben and Rook visit her and Kevin at college, but Darkstar gets revenge by using Charmcaster's rock monsters, and creates a cult to use Gwen to open up a portal to Ledgerdomain to absorb all the mana to become even powerful.: Omnitrix alien debuts: Ghostfreak
43	3	"Bengeance Is Mine"	John Fang	Eugene Son	March 1, 2014	503	1.272
Bill Gacks, a normal human plumber who resembles Vilgax, accidentally activates a weapon Vilgax set to attack Bellwood while fixing Pakmar's plumbing in Undertown. When Psyphon returns, he believes Bill is Vilgax, and pledges to help him destroy Bellwood. Meanwhile Ben and Rook try to stop Vilgax's squid monsters that the weapon accidentally released.
44	4	"An American Benwolf in London"	Dan Riba	David McDermott	March 8, 2014	504	1.261
Ben's first and former crush, Kai Green, asks Ben and Rook for help when her grandfather Wes Green is kidnapped by Chadwick and the Forever Knights, who are after a mysterious sword called Excalibur hidden in Big Ben London.: Omnitrix alien debuts: Blitzwolfer
45	5	"Animo Crackers"	Jae Hong Kim	Len Uhley	March 15, 2014	505	0.919
Dr. Animo from the future returns to the present to break his past self out of prison, and to steal something from the SACT so that they can populate and rule the Earth with mutant animals. In order for Ben and Rook to stop him, they get assistance of someone from the future currently known as Chrono-Spanner.: Omnitrix alien debuts: Gutrot
46	6	"Rad Monster Party"	John Fang and Jae Woo Kim	Jonathan Callan	March 22, 2014	506	1.255
Ben, Rook, Rad, and Hobble fly through the Anur System to deliver something before they end up crashing into Anur Transyl, needing a device to power up their engine. But as they walk through the planet, due to Anur Transyl being all but closed to the rest of the universe, the Halloweenish residents see Ben and his group as the monsters. Ben learns that Zs'Skayr has orchestrated the delivery to bring himself and Dr. Viktor back to their home system with revenge as an added bonus.
47	7	"Charmed, I'm Sure"	Dan Riba	Charlotte Fullerton and Kevin Rubio	March 29, 2014	507	1.418
Still stranded on Anur Transyl, Ben suffers from a serious zit problem that grows worse each time he uses the Omnitrix. At the same time, Charmcaster proposes an alliance to defeat Zs'Skayr, since he stole the Alpha Rune from her. Also, a female Transylian alien named Viktoria develops a crush on Ben, due to his terrible acne.
48	8	"The Vampire Strikes Back"	Jae Hong Kim	Len Uhley	April 5, 2014	508	1.035
Zs'Skayr and his allies awaken Lord Transyl, where he asks to make an alliance to rule the universe, but just as they team up, they manage to hypnotize everyone on Anur Transyl, and Ben's team. Now with Ben's newest alien Whampire, Ben and Hobble must discover a way to defeat Lord Transyl, save everyone, and fix their ship to get back to Earth.: Omnitrix alien debuts: Whampire
49	9	"Catfight (Note: This episode was produced as part of the sixth story arc.)"	Jae Hong Kim	David McDermott	April 12, 2014	601	1.183
As Ben and Rook go on a double date with Ester and Rayona (Rook's girlfriend back home), they encounter Nyancy Chan, who places Ben under her trance and uses him in a crime spree. Meanwhile, Princesses Looma and Attea are at odds about who will get to legally marry Ben's alien forms: Four Arms and Bullfrag.
50	10	"Collect This!"	Jae Hong Kim	Michael Ryan	April 19, 2014	602	1.063
Ben meets the ones responsible for his intergalactic TV show and the crew who makes this Ben 10 actor more famous than Ben himself. With Ben frustrated with this show on the air and taking his fame, Simian ends up hiring an alien collector known as Collectimus, who turns things into trading cards for his collection.

=== Story Arc 6: The Evil Rooters (2014) ===
No. overall	No. in story arc	Title	Directed by	Written by	Original release date	Prod. code	Viewers (millions)
51	1	"And Then There Were None (Note: These episodes were produced as part of the fifth story arc.)"	Jae Woo Kim	Eugene Son	October 6, 2014	509	N/A
Vilgax and Eon team up and bring together a team of evil-parallel Bens, (consisting of Albedo, the black haired "Bad Ben", the Australian-accented warlord Mad-Ben, the deformed, zombie-like Benzarro and the apathetic, gothic Nega-Ben) who go after a Ben who never got an Omnitrix (No Watch Ben). Professor Paradox helps Ben Prime (the main Ben 10) to find a team of Good Bens (consisting of Ben 23, 10-year-old "Gwen 10" from a parallel timeline where she got the Omnitrix before Ben, and Ben Prime's future self, Ben 10,000) to fight back and save No Watch Ben. However, things take a turn for the worse when Vilgax betrays Eon and uses a Chronosapien time bomb to wipe out Ben in every other dimension apart from No Watch Ben. Before disappearing, Ben Prime gives his Omnitrix to No Watch Ben.: Biomnitrix alien debuts: Fourmungousaur, Atomic-X; Hero Watch alien debuts: Build-A-Guy
52	2	"And Then There Was Ben"	Dan Riba	Thomas Pugsley	October 7, 2014	510	N/A
No Watch Ben and Professor Paradox return to the point where Ben Prime first acquired the prototype Omnitrix six years ago. From there the two start to unite the good Bens to fight Vilgax and the evil Bens. After the team is put together, Paradox sends the other Tennysons who had their watches to fight and keeps No Watch Ben in the event horizon. After Vilgax destroys the multiverse, No Watch Ben returns to fight him and turns into Clockwork to undo the multiverse wipeout. Clockwork sends the Evil Bens back to their respective timelines, then returns the Omnitrix to Ben Prime, and the Good Bens and Gwen 10 take turns beating Vilgax once and for all.: Omnitrix alien debuts: Heatblast (10-year-old); Hero Watch alien debuts: Eye Guy, Big Bug, Vomit Man
53	3	"The Vengers"	Jae Woo Kim	Charlotte Fullerton and Kevin Rubio	October 8, 2014	603	N/A
Billy Billions seeks the help of Mazuma, Will Harangue, Kangaroo Kommando, and Captain Nemesis to form the team The Vengers to take down Ben, make him look bad in front of all of Bellwood, and claim the title as the protectors of Bellwood.
54	4	"Cough It Up"	Jae Woo Kim	Robert Hoegee	October 9, 2014	604	N/A
With Spanner's unexpected return, Ben and Rook think Jimmy Jones is Spanner because they never appear at the same time. Meanwhile Argit holds a weapon that can create Techadons with the use of water, and Psyphon and his Bounty Hunters are after the weapon, but when Argit swallows it, they have to tell Argit to "cough it up" or he won't stop puking up armies of Techadons.
55	5	"The Rooters of All Evil"	Dan Riba	Len Uhley	October 10, 2014	605	N/A
The Rooters, the Black Ops wing of the Plumbers from the Null Void, head to the Plumbers' Base, looking for Kevin for his property-absorbing powers. Ben sneaks out to get Kevin, who claims to not know the Rooters, but after a run in with their leader, Proctor Servantis, he begins to recollect hidden memories.
56	6	"Blukic and Driba Go to Area 51"	Jae Hong Kim	Eugene Son	October 13, 2014	606	N/A
An old friend of Blukic and Driba asks them to get back a powerful weapon needed to stop an old villain who is attacking Area 51. But with the weapon hidden back in Area 51, Ben and the team must go retrieve it before this strange threat can retrieve the weapon.
57	7	"No Honor Among Bros"	Dan Riba	David McDermott	October 14, 2014	607	N/A
Rook is under the influence of Fistrick's "bro" essence, and starts to act like a bro. He and Ben infiltrate an alien fight club to claim the Golden Fist.
58	8	"Universe vs. Tennyson"	Jae Woo Kim	Marty Isenberg	October 15, 2014	608	N/A
Ben gets dragged into intergalactic court by the other Celestialsapiens for recreating the universe in "So Long and Thanks for All the Smoothies!". In the end, the court rules in Ben's favor that Alien X was not controlled by Ben but by Bellicus and Serena.
59	9	"Weapon XI, Part 1"	Dan Riba	Charlotte Fullerton and Kevin Rubio	October 16, 2014	609	N/A
Kevin and Argit attempt to warn the amalgam kids about the Rooters' intentions before they can hunt them. Kevin gathers Alan, and Gwen, Ben, and Rook gather Helen and Manny. The Amalgam kids learn they are not natural alien hybrids, and Kevin goes out into the Null Void alone to put an end to the Rooters, but when Ben and the gang bring the Amalgam Kids, it turns them against Ben, and later Proctor Servantis (head of the Rooters) ends up persuading Kevin into joining his side to take down Ben.
60	10	"Weapon XI, Part 2"	Jae Hong Kim	Matt Wayne	October 17, 2014	610	N/A
After the Rooters have turned Kevin and the amalgam kids against Ben, they attend to hunt after him while Ben, Gwen, Rook, Argit, and Zed try to escape the Null Void.

=== Story Arc 7: The Mad Nightmare (2014) ===
No. overall	No. in story arc	Title	Directed by	Written by	Original release date	Prod. code	Viewers (millions)
61	1	"Clyde Five"	Jae Woo Kim	David McDermott	October 20, 2014	701	N/A
Ben's country cousin Clyde Fife wants to become a hero like Ben and finds a mysterious device by the techadon weapon master which Clyde dubs the "Cincotrix".
62	2	"Rook Tales"	Dan Riba	Robert Hoegee	October 21, 2014	702	N/A
Master Kundo, Rook's former teacher, is willing to save Revonnahgander traditions at any cost by preventing Rook's sister, Rook Sharr from going to the Plumber Academy so she wouldn't be able to become a Plumber.
63	3	"Charm School"	Jae Hong Kim	Jonathan Callan	October 22, 2014	703	N/A
Charmcaster attacks Gwen at Friedkin University to obtain Hex's mystical Staff of Ages, while Kevin and Rook try to make Kevin's car completely indestructible so that nothing can destroy it.
64	4	"The Ballad of Mr. Baumann"	Jae Woo Kim	Thomas Pugsley	October 23, 2014	704	N/A
After Mr. Baumann, the grouchy storekeeper, realizes from Ben that his temper comes from being lonely he starts soul-searching. Eventually he stumbles across a secret not from this earth.
65	5	"Fight at the Museum"	Dan Riba	Kevin Rubio and David McDermott	October 24, 2014	705	N/A
When Ester invites Ben (who brings along Rook to her dismay) to a museum exhibit displaying alien artifacts, they encounter Ben's former crush Kai. When Ester discovers their relationship she immediately becomes jealous of her. The four of them are forced to team up, however, when the orb of puma punka that Kai put on display is stolen. Chrono Spanner also reappears again, this time trying to convince Ben that he's destined to marry Kai, much to Ester's chagrin.
66	6	"Breakpoint"	Jae Hong Kim	Dani Michaeli	October 27, 2014	706	N/A
Fistrick orchestrates a series of robberies while wearing ID masks to make him and his compatriots to resemble Ben. When the real Ben discovers what's going on he decides to go undercover with Rook's help and investigate Fistrick's workout gym to find out what's going on. As this is all happening, Ben is struggling with his obsessive cravings for chili fries and meatball subs.
67	7	"The Color of Monkey"	Jae Woo Kim	Amy Keating Rogers	October 28, 2014	707	N/A
With the help of the con-artist Simian, Argit starts a secure transport firm called "Argistix Securities" employing a group of Techadons as workers. Ben immediately becomes suspicious of Argit's business, considering the latter's history.
68	8	"Vreedlemania"	Dan Riba	Len Uhley	October 29, 2014	708	N/A
Pa Vreedle reunites with Ma for all-out, total cosmic destruction! Meanwhile, Rhomboid and Octagon try to impress Ma and Pa Vreedle like Isosceles and Parallelogram Vreedle always does.
69	9	"It's a Mad, Mad, Mad Ben World, Part 1"	Jae Hong Kim	Marty Isenberg	October 30, 2014	709	N/A
A dangerous Chronosapien named Maltruant attempts to obtain total control over the space-time continuum; Ben 23 is sent by the Azmuth of his dimension to Ben Prime's dimension for the latter to act as a "mentor" to the former.: Hero Watch alien debuts: Speedyquick, Toolboxx, Nighty Knight, Mr. Monkey, Techno-Bubble
70	10	"It's a Mad, Mad, Mad Ben World, Part 2"	Jae Woo Kim	Len Wein	October 31, 2014	710	N/A
With the help of Dr. Psychobos, Ben 23 and Ben Prime successfully stage a breakout and revolution in Mad Ben's labor camp.: Hero Watch alien debuts: Dino-Mighty, Freezeghost, Handy Man, Lightning Volt, Brainfrog

=== Story Arc 8: The Time War (2014) ===
No. overall	No. in story arc	Title	Directed by	Written by	Original release date	Prod. code	Viewers (millions)
71	1	"From Hedorium to Eternity"	Dan Riba	Eric Wallace	November 3, 2014	801	N/A
In a flashback to Ben and Gwen's younger days when they were eleven, Zs'Skayr returns with a plan to have his fellow Ectonurites to possess the inhabitants of Bellwood to develop a device to block out the sunlight on Earth so he can colonize the planet with more Ectonurites.: Omnitrix alien debuts: Upgrade (11-year-old)
72	2	"Stuck on You"	Jae Hong Kim	Richard Pursel	November 4, 2014	802	N/A
Khyber teams up with a Slimebiote, a DNA-eating parasite, named Skurd so he can safely use the Nemetrix to eliminate Ben. The plan backfires when Skurd discovers the amount of DNA he can consume from the Omnitrix and decides to latch onto it. As Khyber goes mad from extended use of the Nemetrix, Skurd gives Ben a combative edge, giving Rook time to remove the Nemetrix with minimal damage to Khyber.
73	3	"Let's Do the Time War Again"	Jae Woo Kim	Kevin Rubio and David McDermott	November 5, 2014	803	N/A
Exo-Skull, Subdora, and Eon attack a hidden cavern to retrieve a rare egg of a Time Beast. Professor Paradox and Ben 10,000 teams up with Ben and Rook to stop the Time Beast. Ben, Rook and Skurd go after the Time Beast while Ben 10,000 and Professor Paradox fight Exo-Skull and Subdora. However, a series of mistakes lead the five of them to constantly travel through time to correct their actions. Eventually the time beast is captured, but at the end of the episode, Eon delivers two Time Beast eggs to Maltruant.: Biomnitrix alien debuts: Crashocker, UpRigg, Big Chuck
74	4	"Secret of Dos Santos"	Dan Riba	Thomas Pugsley	November 6, 2014	804	N/A
During Kai's search for the Temple of the Sky, she reluctantly teams up with Ben, Skurd, and Rook at the insistence of Kai's grandfather. As they search, Ben teases Kai about Spanner telling them they are married in the future, and as he shows her more clues they show more attraction, despite Kai denying Spanner's prediction. Upon reaching the temple and finding the relic inside, the guardian of the temple is an eons old Galvan tasked with protecting a dangerous component of Maltruant.
75	5	"Third Time's a Charm"	Jae Hong Kim	Jonathan Callan	November 7, 2014	805	N/A
Charmcaster traps Gwen in Ledgerdomain to exact her revenge once and for all, turning her into a stone totem. When she attempts to take over Gwen's headquarters at Friedkin University, Ben, Kevin and Rook fight back with the aid of the great sorcerer Bezel. Charmcaster is eventually defeated and turned into a totem herself, trapped in her own bag, which restores Gwen, Hex, Addwaitya, and Darkstar to normal. Darkstar is arrested, Addwaitya escapes, and Charmcaster is kept in Hex and Gwen's custody under the hope that she will see the error of her ways someday.
76	6	"The Final Countdown"	Jae Woo Kim	Geoffrey Thorne	November 10, 2014	806	N/A
While Rook is stuck on graveyard shift at Plumber HQ, his sensei Kundo returns to purge the galaxy of technological influence. Ben and Max take a massive Plumber squadron to stop Yeta, a female Shocksquach alien, from continuing her criminal destruction. They later find HQ on lockdown because of Kundo and try to break into the base to give Rook back up. Fistina, the only prisoner, is deputized by Rook so as to help defeat Kundo. Following Kundo's defeat, Rook is effectively promoted to Magister and Fistina is allowed to go to the academy following her time served.
77	7	"Malgax Attacks"	Dan Riba	Eric Wallace	November 11, 2014	807	N/A
Ben finally manages to rid himself of Skurd, just when he needs the Slimebiote most. Vilgax and Albedo team up to steal Malware's calcified husk to convert into a war armor for Vilgax to defeat Ben. As Ben fights Vilgax, he realizes how much he needs Skurd to help him, while Azmuth, Luhley, Blukic and Driba fight Albedo. Azmuth uses a device he made years ago which disables Albedo's Ultimatrix and frees Skurd, in time to merge with Ben and defeat Vilgax. Ben thanks Skurd for his rescue, while Luhley decides to go on a date with Driba, while having her cousin date Blukic. In space, Vilgax's stone form oozes out what appears to be a reconstituted Malware.: Ultimatrix alien debuts: Ultimate Rath
78	8	"The Most Dangerous Game Show"	Jae Hong Kim	Yuri Lowenthal	November 12, 2014	808	N/A
Ben is being forced to be in an alien reality show called The Most Delicious Show and he watches as all the girls he'd met in his life to win the reality show's games to be the new Mrs. Tennyson. Soon, Kai wins the reality show, but finds out the girls were sent to the Null Void, with Ester later revealing that she found another boyfriend–Sunny's old sweetheart Antonio.
79	9	"The End of an Era"	Jae Woo Kim	Kevin Rubio and David McDermott	November 13, 2014	809	N/A
In a twenty-year future, Ben 10,000 and the future Kai Green are having a party for Grandpa Max because he is retiring from the Plumbers and Rook is being promoted to be in charge of the Plumbers until Maltruant, Exo-Skull and Subdora secretly attack Plumbers' Headquarters to get the Annihilaarg and Dwarf Star. Ben 10,000 and Kai both discover that their ally Chrono Spanner is actually their own son, Ken Tennyson.: Biomnitrix alien debuts: Humungoopsaur
80	10	"A New Dawn"	Dan Riba	Matt Youngberg	November 14, 2014	810	N/A
Following Maltruant through the time stream, Ben has an adventure with George Washington, in 1773, fighting Maltruant and Vilgax. After defeating Vilgax, Ben and Rook chase Maltruant in the time stream to the beginning of time itself onto the starship of the Contemelia (the creators of the Annihilaarg) where Maltruant attempts to create a universe of his own using his own Anihilaarg. In a climactic battle, using the power of Feedback, Ben absorbs the Dwarf Star-powered Anihilaarg and uses its power to defeat Maltruant once and for all, trapping him in a time loop that will result in him reliving the events of the Time War for eternity. Back on Earth, Ben decides to go on a road trip across the recreated universe with Rook, Gwen and Kevin, concluding the series.

== See also ==
- List of Ben 10 (2005–2008) episodes
- List of Ben 10: Alien Force episodes
- List of Ben 10: Ultimate Alien episodes
- List of Ben 10 (2016–2021) episodes
