= HyperScan =

Video game console

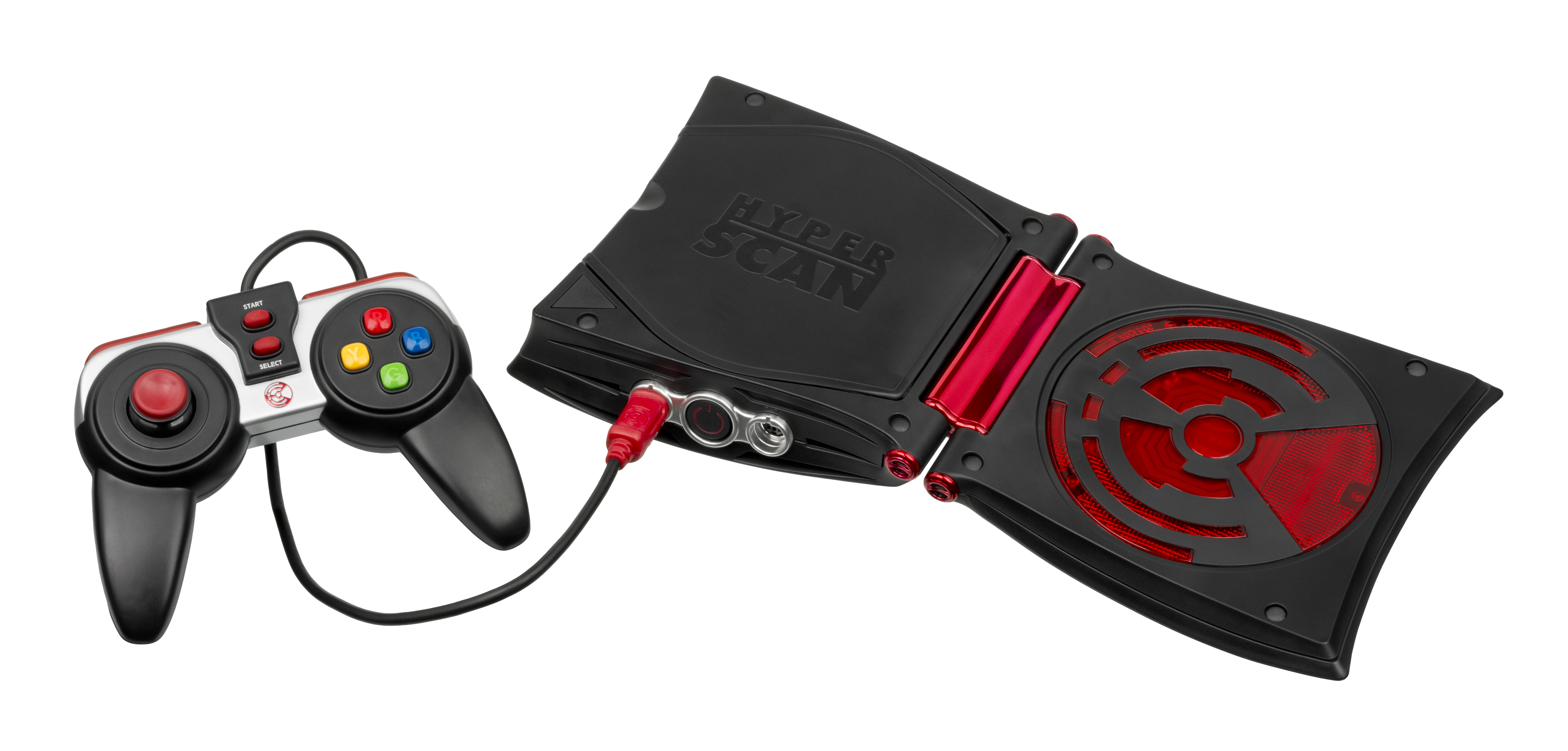
- A HyperScan console (right) and controller
- Manufacturer: Mattel
- Type: Video game console
- Generation: Seventh
- Released: October 23, 2006
- Introductory price: $69.99
- Discontinued: 2007
- Units sold: ~30,000
- Media: CD-ROM
- System on a chip: Sunplus SPG290 @ 108 MHz
- Memory: 16MB DDR SDRAM
- Storage: RFID cards
- Controller input: Gamepad
- Best-selling game: X-Men (pack-in)

The HyperScan is a home video game console developed by the toy company Mattel. The console uniquely includes a 13.56 MHz radio-frequency identification (RFID) scanner that reads and writes to special IntelliCards which activate features in, and save data from, the games. Players can enhance their characters by scanning cards. The system was marketed for tweens, with games based on popular superhero franchises such as Marvel Comics and Ben 10.

The HyperScan was released in North America on October 23, 2006. Games retailed for $19.99 and the console for $69.99 at launch, but at the end of its short lifespan, prices of the system were down to $9.99, the games $1.99, and booster packs $0.99. Only five games were released, and two more were canceled.

The HyperScan was critically panned upon its release for its outdated 2D graphics, weak game library, and being less capable than other similar consoles such as the VTech V.Flash, which was released the month prior. Critics lamented the number and cost of IntelliCards needed to complete a set. With disappointing sales, Mattel discontinued the HyperScan the following year, and canceled all upcoming game and card releases. The system is considered a commercial failure, with total lifetime sales estimated at 30,000 units.

== Hardware ==
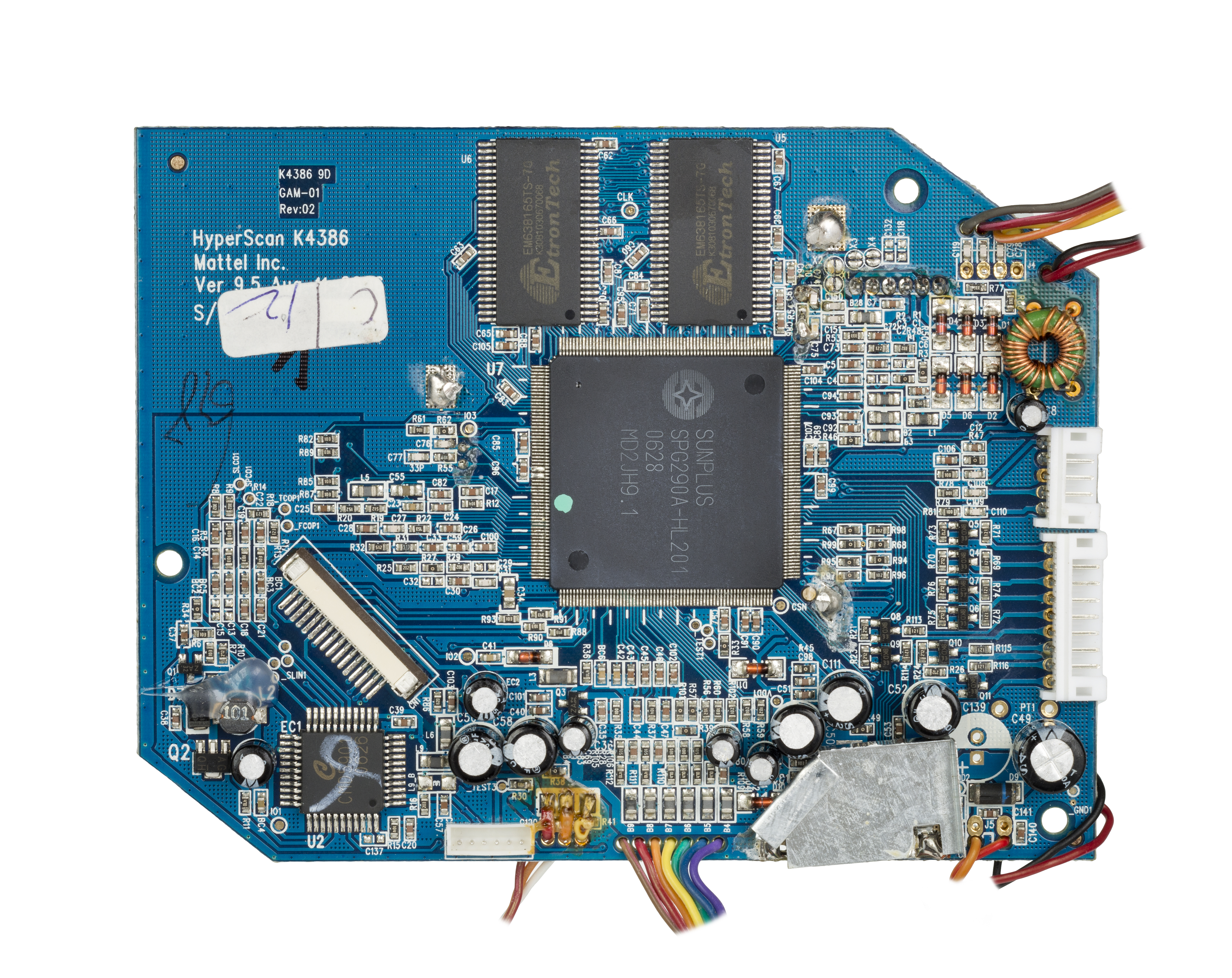
The HyperScan is based on the Sunplus SPG290A system-on-a-chip.

The HyperScan uses a Sunplus SPG290 SoC implementing the S+core 32-bit microarchitecture designed by Sunplus Technology. The S+core instruction set architecture has a 32/16-bit hybrid instruction mode, features Advanced Microcontroller Bus Architecture (AMBA) support and includes SJTAG for in-circuit emulation. The system has 16 MB of DDR SDRAM.

Video output is a composite video cable permanently attached. Its native resolution is 640×480, with up to 65,535 colors. Its SoC supports TFT LCD, but the system does not implement this. One USB port is at the rear.

The RFID scanner that operates at 13.56 MHz. Cards utilize RFID storage that has 96 bytes of user memory, an 8 byte unique ID, and 6 bytes of one time programmable memory. The HyperScan's RFID systems were provided by Innovision Research and Technology plc, a fabless semiconductor design house based in the UK which specializes in RFID systems and chip design.

Games are distributed on UDF format CD-ROMs. Two controller ports use a six-pin mini-DIN connector.

== Software ==
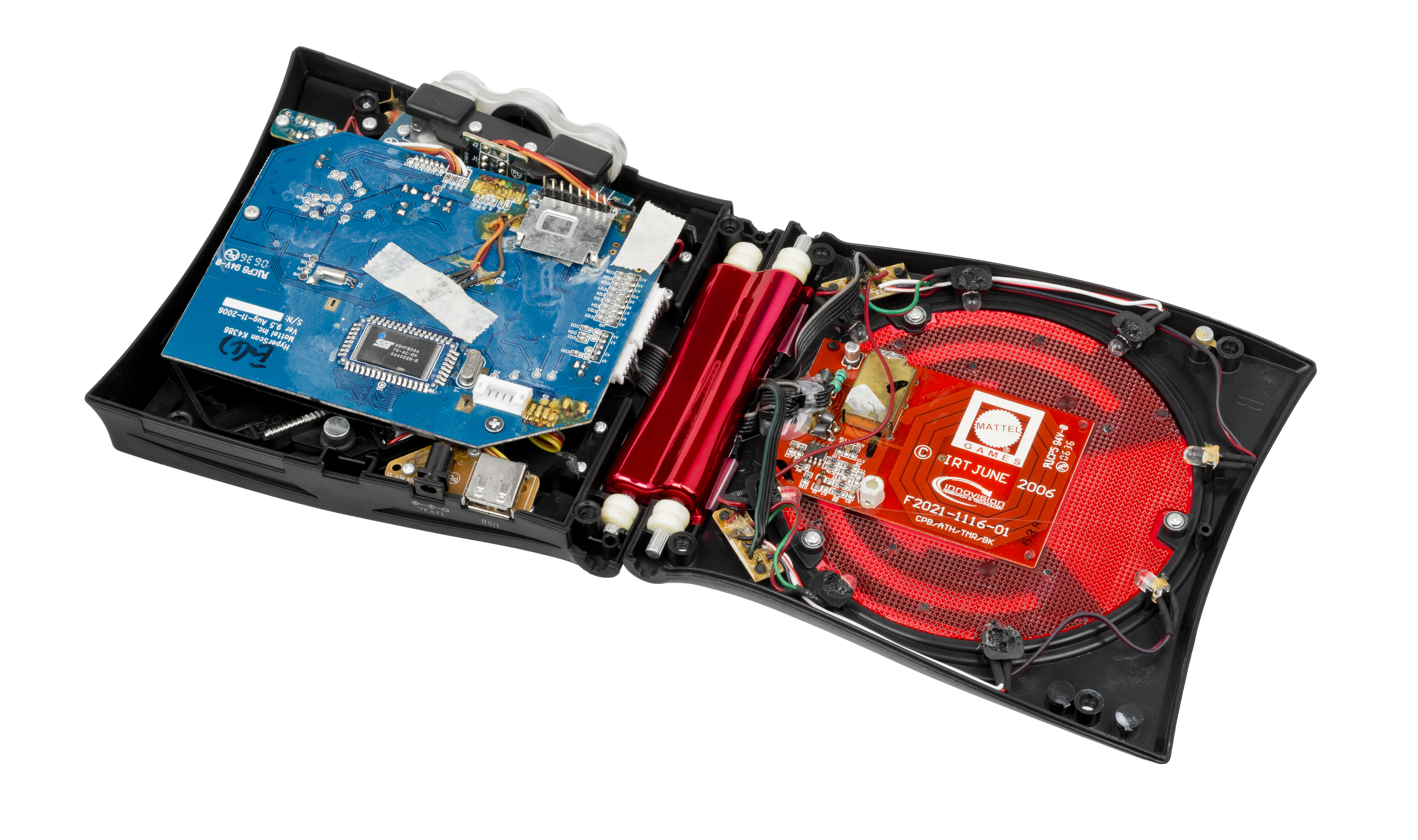
A partly disassembled HyperScan shows the RFID scanner.

Only five games were released, and two more were canceled due to the system's poor sales and reception.

Game Packs consist of a game disc and six game cards (seven for Spider-Man). Additional cards which contain characters, abilities, moves and levels when scanned are part of a six-card Booster Pack, released for $10/pack. As with most trading card packs, the cards were randomized.

Multiple booster packs were intended for certain games. X-Men intended to have 102 cards to unlock parts of the game in separate "red" and "black" series; the latter went unreleased due to the console's cancellation.

Title	Description	Total cards	Booster packs for complete set and minimum price
Ben 10	Side-scrolling platform game, the only Cartoon Network-exclusive video game for the system.	80 released (6 included + 74)	13 packs $150 ($20 game + $130 packs)
Interstellar Wrestling League	2v2 fighting game similar to ClayFighter, but with alien-like characters.	54 released (6 included + 48), 51 unreleased	8 packs $100 ($20 game + $80 packs)
Marvel Heroes	Side-scrolling platform game including some X-Men characters.	70 released (6 included + 64)	11 packs $130 ($20 game + $110 packs)
Spider-Man	Side-scrolling platform game	59 released (7 included + 52), 1 unreleased	9 packs $110 ($20 game + $90 packs)
X-Men	Fighting game in which two characters face off against each other in self-contained matches similar to Street Fighter. It is the only game on the console to be rated T for "Teen".	56 released (6 included + 50), 46 unreleased	9 packs $159.99 ($69.99 console and game + $90 packs)
Avatar: The Last Air Bender (cancelled)	-	-	-
Nick Extreme Sports (cancelled)	-	-	-

Following the system's discontinuation, hobbyist programmers created a few homebrew demos including a CD-Door demo, 3D wireframe demo, and a Bluescale demo.

== Retail ==
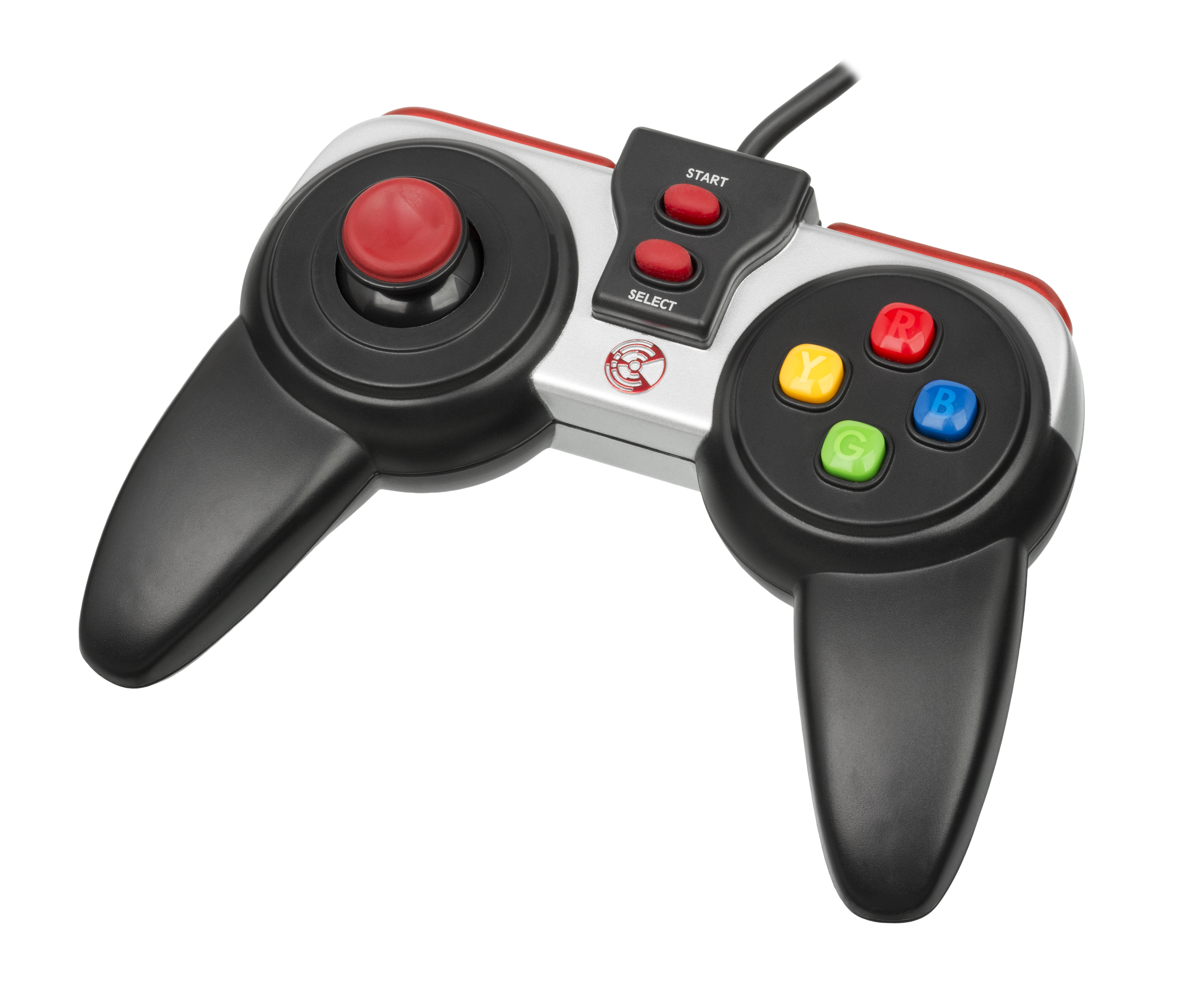
The HyperScan controller

The system was sold in two varieties: a cube and a 2-player value pack. The cube box version was the version sold in stores. It included the system, controller, an X-Men game disc, and 6 X-Men cards. Two-player value packs were sold online and included an extra controller and 12 additional X-Men cards.

The included game was rated "T" and the remaining games were rated "E10+" by the ESRB.

== Reception ==
The console was universally panned by critics for its clunky design, broken controls, poor library, long loading screens, and the unnecessary usage of cards to select characters, and was officially discontinued in 2007. It is featured as one of the ten worst systems by PC World magazine.
