= List of Ben 10: Alien Force episodes =

This is a list of episodes of the American animated television series, Ben 10: Alien Force. It aired for three seasons, between 2008 and 2010, on the Cartoon Network. The series was created by team Man of Action (a group consisting of Duncan Rouleau, Joe Casey, Joe Kelly, and Steven T. Seagle), and produced by Cartoon Network Studios. It takes place five years after the original Ben 10 series and takes a darker turn than its predecessor. Ben 10: Alien Force was followed by the direct 2010 sequel series Ben 10: Ultimate Alien.

== Series overview ==
| Season | Episodes | Originally released | |
| Season | Episodes | First released | Last released |
|---|---|---|---|
| 1 | 13 | April 18, 2008 | August 31, 2008 |
| 2 | 13 | October 10, 2008 | March 27, 2009 |
| 3 | 20 | September 11, 2009 | March 26, 2010 |

== Episodes ==
=== Season 1 (2008) ===
| No. overall | No. in season | Title | Directed by | Written by | Original release date | Prod. code |
|---|---|---|---|---|---|---|
| 1 | 1 | "Ben 10 Returns, Part 1" | Dan Riba | Dwayne McDuffie | April 18, 2008 | 680-001 |
Five years after the original Ben 10 series, a matured 15-year-old Ben Tennyson has removed the Omnitrix and lives a normal high school life. After winning a soccer game, he visits the Rust Bucket to see his Grandpa Max. He finds Max missing and encounters a mysterious alien which flees. Searching the RV, He finds a message left by Max claiming that he is investigating renewed alien activity on Earth, and that he has the Omnitrix. Ben confirms that the Omnitrix is still in his bedroom, and deduces that Max was hinting for Ben to put the Omnitrix back on. Ben consults his cousin Gwen, and the two are confronted by Magister Labrid, a Plumber who was aiding Max in his investigation before going missing. They agree to work together to find Max, and Ben puts the Omnitrix back on. The trio ambush an illegal trade between the Forever Knights and a group of the aliens who attacked him. During the battle, the Omnitrix reconfigures, giving Ben access to ten new alien forms. He is then attacked by his old nemesis Kevin Levin, the broker of the trade, whom he defeats. He reluctantly agrees to help track down the Forever Knights who had fled, and the group travels to a Forever Knight castle, where they encounter a robotic dragon. Omnitrix alien debuts: Swampfire
| 2 | 2 | "Ben 10 Returns, Part 2" | Butch Lukic | Dwayne McDuffie | April 18, 2008 | 680-002 |
Ben, Gwen, Kevin, and Labrid defeat the robotic dragon and the Forever Knights, but in the process, Labrid is critically wounded. Telling Ben to keep investigating the alien conspiracy and to believe in himself, Labrid dies. Kevin, taking Labrid's Plumber's badge, agrees to continue helping Ben and Gwen. They trace the aliens to a huge underground facility housing a massive spaceship. Gwen concludes that Max was previously in the facility, but left. Ben decides that they need to finish the mission, and they proceed deeper into the facility, where they encounter an army of aliens led by an enormous, virtually invulnerable Highbreed. Ben duels the Highbreed until their spaceship launches, and the Highbreed orders the destruction of the surrounding area to hide their activities. Ben is able to sabotage the ship just before it vaporizes a hospital, and it crashes and explodes in the desert. Ben, Gwen and Kevin, who is now alongside them, then decide to continue working together to find out what happened to their paternal grandfather. Omnitrix alien debuts: Echo Echo, Humungousaur: As a two-part episode, this premiere is minutes longer than the regular 23-minute episodes.
| 3 | 3 | "Everybody Talks About the Weather" | Dan Riba | Dwayne McDuffie | April 26, 2008 | 680-003 |
In search of Max's whereabouts, Ben, Gwen, and Kevin receive a Plumber's badge signal and enter the town of Grover's Mill, where local authorities are in pursuit of a Pyronite (the species of Ben's alien Heatblast) who is allegedly burning crop circles with his powers. Ben subdues the Pyronite, who reveals himself as Alan Albright, a half-human; his father was a Pyronite Plumber who gave him his badge to protect him from being arrested for interstellar trespassing. Ben helps Alan escape from the police, and they investigate the crop circles, which Gwen deduces are actually circuit boards spread across the whole valley. They discover that they were created by the aliens they previously fought (known as DNAliens), which activate the circuit boards and cause a huge machine to rise and alter the weather to lower temperatures. Ben and Alan destroy the weather machine, and the sheriff, realizing that Alan was not to blame for the attacks, recruits him to help search for more aliens in the region. Omnitrix alien debuts: Jetray
| 4 | 4 | "Kevin's Big Score" | Butch Lukic | Matt Wayne | May 3, 2008 | 680-004 |
Kevin meets with an old friend named Argit, who claims he knows the location of a particular piece of alien technology that Kevin is looking for. Needing something to bargain with, Kevin steals Max's RV, the Rust Bucket II, but after seeing the huge amount of Plumber's tech and weapons inside it, Argit double-crosses Kevin and steals the RV for himself. The team follows Argit with a tracking device that Kevin hid on the Rust Bucket's undercarriage and stops Argit, but Kevin storms away to seek out Vulkanus, who is in possession of the alien device. Kevin tries to make a deal with Vulkanus, but the latter forces Kevin to absorb a rare alien crystal called Taedenite, planning to use him as a living gem mine. Ben and Gwen arrive and defeat Vulkanus, and the alien tech Kevin sought is revealed to be a message from Max, who instructs Ben to put together a team of Plumber's children to prepare for what is coming. Omnitrix alien debuts: Big Chill
| 5 | 5 | "All That Glitters" | Dan Riba | Bob Goodman | May 10, 2008 | 680-005 |
While Ben obsesses over fulfilling Max's request to find other Plumbers' kids, Gwen and Kevin come at odds over their mutual romantic feelings and Kevin's inaction in asking her out. The team encounters a weakened high school girl named Trina who nearly causes a car accident, which is averted by a superpowered boy named Michael Morningstar, who reveals himself as another Plumber's kid. Michael explains that something is causing girls at his school to become zombified monsters, and they agree to investigate together. They find and battle a group of zombie girls, who escape after Michael causes debris to fall between them. Gwen, infatuated with Michael and annoyed with Kevin, agrees to go on a date with him. Kevin, distrusting Michael, convinces Ben to check on her with him, where they find Michael absorbing her powers and turning her into a zombie. Michael is revealed to have been the one zombifying his classmates, stealing their life force for themselves. Gwen is able to defeat Michael, and the girls take their life force back from him, deforming him in the process. Kevin then destroys Michael's Plumber's badge, and Ben apologizes for being too quick to trust Michael. Omnitrix alien debuts: Chromastone
| 6 | 6 | "Max Out" | Butch Lukic | Jim Krieg | May 17, 2008 | 680-007 |
Gwen's older brother Ken is missing, and she asks for Ben and Kevin's help to find him. The gang stumbles upon a Highbreed base in a small town called Santa Mira that manufactures Xenocytes, headcrab-style alien parasites that mutate humans into DNAliens. Ken has been infected by one of the Xenocytes, but Ben is able to remove it with the help of the Omnitrix. With Ken in tow, the gang finds Grandpa Max inside the base. While the team and Ken destroy shipments of Xenocytes, Max sets about destroying the factory while searching for the egg-laying machine. Upon their return, the gang finds Max locked in battle with a Highbreed commander. In an act of self-sacrifice, Max uses an unfocused Null Void projector to destroy the Highbreed base, seemingly killing himself and the Highbreed in the process.
| 7 | 7 | "Pier Pressure" | Dan Riba | Len Uhley | May 31, 2008 | 680-006 |
Gwen convinces Ben to ask out his crush, Julie Yamamoto, after she wins a tennis match, to go on a date to a nearby amusement pier. Meanwhile, an alien spaceship crashes on Earth and releases a small, symbiotic alien which begins to take over carnival rides to track down and attack Ben. The alien kidnaps Julie and lures Ben to the crashed ship, which Ben finds is on a self-destruct countdown, with a Galvanic Mechamorph (the species of Ben's alien Upgrade) is trapped inside. Ben is able to rescue the Mechamorph, Baz-l, and prevents the ship from exploding. Baz-l explains that the symbiotic Mechamorph, nicknamed "Ship," was sent out in order to find a Plumber to rescue him, and mistook Ben for one due to the Omnitrix. Baz-l repairs the ship and leaves Earth, leaving Ship in Ben and Julie's care. Ben and Julie then walk home together, while Ship flees. Omnitrix alien debuts: Brainstorm
| 8 | 8 | "What Are Little Girls Made Of?" | Butch Lukic | Matt Wayne | June 7, 2008 | 680-009 |
While Ben, Gwen, and Kevin are taking a break at Max's favorite fishing spot, they see a mysterious cloaked elderly woman leave a pink-and-yellow flower at the base of a nearby tree that depicts the romance sign "Max + Verdona". When the team tries to meet her, she disappears in a sudden flash of pink/magenta-colored light. They decide to stake out the area for a while until the elderly woman shows up again. When she reappears, Ben and Kevin confront her, and she is revealed to possess magical powers exactly like Gwen's. However, when she sees Gwen use her powers against her, she is amazed. Gwen's innate magical/mystical powers are revealed to be had been inherited from the strange woman - Ben and Gwen's long-lost paternal grandmother, Max's wife, as well as the mother of Carl and Frank, Verdona, who is an immensely powerful energy being called an anodite from the distant world Anodyne. Verdona attempts to convince Gwen to break out of her human body and embrace her full strength and abilities of her innermost anodite self, but Gwen adamantly refuses. Verdona reluctantly leaves, but promises to return to visit now and then. Omnitrix alien debuts: Spidermonkey
| 9 | 9 | "The Gauntlet" | Dan Riba | Rob Hoegee | June 14, 2008 | 680-010 |
After the team faces off against a Techadon robot, Kevin grabs the severed hand of the robot and places it in his trunk. At night, Ben's childhood bullies J.T. and Cash Murray see Kevin's car outside a restaurant, and decide to wreck it. They push it down a hill, smashing the trunk open. They look inside and grab the Techadon gauntlet before the car's alarm attracts Kevin. Back at their hangout, Cash puts the gauntlet on, planning on using its built-in laser blaster to destroy Ben once and for all and repair their reputation but the full robot armor begins to reform around Cash's body. In doing so, the arm messes with Cash's mind, making him more hostile than usual. Ben fights Cash, and J.T. attempts to reason with him. After remembering his friendship with J.T., Cash's willpower overrides the robot arm, and it gradually reduces in size to the point where Cash can take it off. J.T. and Cash walk away with a newfound respect for Ben. Omnitrix alien debuts: Goop
| 10 | 10 | "Paradox" | Butch Lukic | Jim Krieg | July 5, 2008 | 680-012 |
The team gets word of a strange creature roaming around an abandoned desert town named Los Soledad. The creature seems to be aging everything it touches at an accelerated rate. While Ben, Gwen, and Kevin investigate, they see a strange man who seems to be able to disappear at will. After trying to fight him, the team learn that he is Professor Paradox, a scientist who was sucked into the event horizon of his time-travel experiment. Displaced from time and space, Paradox is able to move through time at will. However, the same mistake that rendered him ageless created the creature they seek. After analyzing its movements, they come to the conclusion that its movement is like that of a man desperately attempting to find his way out of a strange town. They realize that it was Paradox's assistant, Hugo, and attempt to travel back in time to prevent him from turning into the creature. As they open a portal and push Hugo away from it, Paradox gets leverage from gumballs, which he claims are unaffected by time, and they are able to place Hugo back into his proper time. Back in the present, the team sees Hugo, and Paradox exchanges pleasantries with him before he departs. Kevin discovers that Paradox fixed his car in the process. Inside, he discovers a note saying that if it were to come into contact with anything from 1976, it would explode like antimatter.
| 11 | 11 | "Be-Knighted" | Dan Riba | Stan Berkowitz | July 12, 2008 | 680-008 |
Kevin has arranged a meeting for Ben with the Forever Knights, who need help in slaying a dragon they have kept captive underneath their castle for 1,000 years. After teaming up with the Knights' mightiest warrior, Sir Connor, in a failed attempt to destroy the dragon, Ben notices that the dragon appears to be trying to communicate. The team leaves the Knights behind and tracks the dragon to a warehouse where its spaceship is being held. Ben fits the dragon with a universal translator so it can speak, and it reveals that he is an alien mapmaker, but was captured by the Forever Knights. Ben helps the dragon find its spaceship, and it departs in peace. He then starts to question the motives of the Forever Knights.
| 12 | 12 | "Plumbers' Helpers" | Dan Riba | Len Uhley | July 19, 2008 | 680-011 |
A pair of rogue half-human Plumbers' kids, a female human-Kineceleran named Helen Wheels, and a male human-Tetramand named Manny Armstrong, have been attacking stray DNAliens and all other aliens they can find, and sucking them into a Null Void projector, believing it to have vaporized them. Believing that the team is DNAliens in disguise, they kidnap Kevin, intending to use him as bait for Gwen and Ben. After his rescue, the two sides work things out. After looking at a database of the aliens they captured and put into the Null Void, Ben realizes that some of them may have been Plumbers' kids. To make things right, the duo set out into the Null Void to rescue those they wrongfully imprisoned.
| 13 | 13 | "X = Ben + 2" | Butch Lukic | Matt Wayne | August 31, 2008 | 680-013 |
The Incursean Emperor Milleous's daughter Attea is kidnapped by the bounty hunter Sevenseven. Unless she is returned, Milleous plans to destroy the Earth. The Emperor's majordomo, Raff, seeks out Kevin to help on the search. Using Gwen's powers to track her, they teleport to a nearby dam to rescue her. When the dam is broken, Ben uses the untested Alien X to try to fix it. The task proves simple thanks to Alien X's reality-warping capabilities, but Attea is yet again captured by Sevenseven and Ben finds himself locked in endless debate with the alien's other two personalities, Bellicus and Serena, unable to move or transform back without their consent. Meanwhile, Kevin and Gwen struggle against the Incursean forces attacking them at all sides. Eventually, Ben is able to convince Serena to transform him into Swampfire, and makes quick work of the enemies. The team completes the job successfully, and Milleous informs them that Earth will be spared. Omnitrix alien debuts: Alien X

=== Season 2 (2008–09) ===
| No. overall | No. in season | Title | Directed by | Written by | Original release date | Prod. code |
|---|---|---|---|---|---|---|
| 14 | 1 | "Darkstar Rising" | Dan Riba | Dwayne McDuffie | October 10, 2008 | 680-015 |
After a Plumber setup to find out if the team has been masquerading as Plumbers, Ben, Gwen and Kevin are forbidden to fight against the Highbreed threat by Plumbers Magister Prior Gilhil. Gilhil has doubts the Highbreed are even as much of a threat as they claim. Elsewhere, a mysterious powerful new enemy 'employs' a Highbreed to attack the team. Having also tipped off Gilhil, all three are captured by the team's old enemy, Michael Morningstar, now calling himself Darkstar and is wearing a mask to hide his deformed face following the incident in "All That Glitters" and he is the one who manipulated Prior Gilhil and Highbreed.
| 15 | 2 | "Alone Together" | Butch Lukic | Charlotte Fullerton | October 17, 2008 | 680-014 |
After an accident with a teleporter pod, Ben and a Highbreed officer named Reinrassig III are stranded on a desert planet called Turrawuste. The pair are forced to work together to fend off the dangerous alien predators on the planet while making their way to the routing station, much to Reinrassig's chagrin. As they make their way across the desert, the two save each other from danger from the violent native alien wildlife, even risking their own lives to do so. The night before they reach the routing station, an alien creature attacks them, severing Reinrassig's right hand. This prompts Ben to transform into Swampfire to reattach it. However, Reinrassig does not take well to this, claiming Ben made him impure. When Ben goes to leave through the portal the next morning, he asks Reinrassig why he is choosing to stay back. Reinrassig says that he is doing so because his Methanosian right hand has rendered him impure by Highbreed standards, and that only pure Highbreed can continue with the invasion.
| 16 | 3 | "Good Copy, Bad Copy (Note: This episode was storied by Joseph Kuhr and script by Matt Wayne.)" | Butch Lukic | Matt Wayne; Joseph Kuhr (story) | October 24, 2008 | 680-016 |
A rogue Galvan (Grey Matter's race) named Albedo builds his own Omnitrix and is permanently stuck in Ben's human form (since wearing the Omnitrix, Ben's DNA has become a default in the Omnitrix). Desperate to find Ben, Albedo resorts to destroying DNA alien hives and Forever Knight castles, demanding information on the teenage Omnitrix wearer. When Gwen and Kevin hear rumors of Ben causing all that damage without them, they're naturally suspicious of the real Ben, who has been studying for a physics test with Julie the entire time. Gwen and Kevin find "Ben" taking out another hive and stop him. When "Ben" answers Kevin's questions, his left eye begins to twitch, suggesting that he is lying. The real Ben comes soon after. The fake Ben reveals himself as Albedo, a Galvan, and "creator of the Omnitrix". When he demands the Omnitrix back, his left eye twitches again. Ben, thinking Albedo is a Highbreed, demands that he reveal his face. Albedo tells him this is not possible because he took on Ben's human form due to Ben's DNA being set as a default for the Omnitrix. Albedo transforms into Jetray and flies off to a computer factory, but Gwen tracks him with the mana he leaves behind. When they follow him there, Albedo sticks Gwen and Kevin to a wall with packing foam. Ben and Albedo continuously change forms as they fight. When both their Omnitrixes time out, Albedo makes one final plea to Ben to remove the Omnitrix. When Ben refuses, Albedo reaches out and attempts to punch Ben. As Ben steps aside, his Omnitrix locks with Albedo's. It sends out a feedback of energy which turns Albedo's jacket and eyes red and his hair white. Azmuth teleports to the facility and tells the group that Albedo was his assistant who helped him build the Omnitrix. Azmuth takes away Albedo's Omnitrix, effectively trapping him in his human form, and sends him to a prison in the Null Void as his punishment, where he plots his revenge and demands chili fries.
| 17 | 4 | "Save the Last Dance" | Dan Riba | Amy Wolfram | November 7, 2008 | 680-017 |
Gwen asks Kevin to take her to her dance at school, forcing a clueless Kevin to seek advice from Ben. However, Ben has his own problems as Big Chill is overriding the Omnitrix, and taking over his body with each transformation. Each time it occurs, Ben finds himself lying on a large metal structure which continues to develop each time he ends up there. Despite the fact that Julie helps him take note of his transformation into Jetray, he involuntarily hits the Omnitrix and turns into Big Chill. Ben has no recollection of the second transformation ever happening when Julie tells him in the morning. On the night of the dance, the group finds themselves following Big Chill out to the large metal structure. It bursts open, revealing green goo inside. Several bubbles of goo emerge and inside of them are baby Necrofriggians. Kevin reveals that Necrofriggians reproduce asexually once every eighty years, meaning that it will be unlikely that Ben will ever have to go through this again. Big Chill sends off his children to live on the Necrofriggian homeworld, and Kevin jokingly calls Ben "Mom" when he turns back. Seeing that they missed their dance, Gwen and Kevin decide to do so out in the desert.
| 18 | 5 | "Undercover" | Butch Lukic | Adam Beechen | November 14, 2008 | 680-018 |
After trying to test a broken teleporter pod, the team decides to enlist the help of Cooper, the young boy who had helped the Tennysons in the past. Upon reaching his home, they discover a video of his capture by the DNAliens. They track him down to the abandoned military base Los Soledad, where Paradox built his time machine. They discover that the Highbreed have erected a cloaking field, built by Cooper over the area, concealing a huge, mysterious arch-shaped device.
| 19 | 6 | "Pet Project" | John Fang | Len Uhley | November 21, 2008 | 680-021 |
The Forever Knights scientist Dr. Joseph Chadwick sends Sir Morton to kidnap Ship so that the Forever Knights can use him to mass-produce a fleet of interstellar spacecraft with which to attack the homeworld of the alien dragon that escaped them. Morton attacks Ship, capturing the small alien. Ben arrives too late, and the team sets out to find the Knights. Assuming that the Knights have something to do with a medieval-themed track of houses, the team, joined by Julie, attempt to sneak into the main house to rescue Ship from being brainwashed.
| 20 | 7 | "Grounded" | Dan Riba | Jim Krieg | November 23, 2008 | 680-020 |
While fighting one of the Highbreed, Ben's parents, Sandra and Carl catch him transforming into Swampfire. Seeing as he comes home with a black eye, they forbid him from using the Omnitrix for fear of him getting hurt and having been lied to for five years in a row. With Gwen and Kevin on the trail of a Highbreed plot, Ben tries to sneak out of the house as Echo Echo. Once Ben's parents see that he disobeyed their orders, they ground him. His various attempts to aid his allies by phone and by computer only results in Ben being forced to tell his parents about Gwen helping him, resulting in her suffering the same fate as her cousin, and leaving Kevin alone to find out what the Highbreed are up to, but later at the ship battling with Highbreed Ben's parents are proud of him because Ben is the only one who can save the world and knows what he's doing and they allow Ben to continue to protect the world.
| 21 | 8 | "Voided" | Butch Lukic | Jim Krieg | December 5, 2008 | 680-023 |
Helen and Manny use Gwen's powers to call on Ben's team to help deal with a dangerous foe in the Null Void: D'Void. Ben goes in alone, with Kevin and Gwen waiting on the other side to bring him back. Once inside, Ben is shocked to learn that "D'Void" is really Dr. Animo, who has taken control of the Null Guardians and enslaved the inhabitants of the Null Void. Ben later encounters Grandpa Max, who was transported to the Null Void in "Max Out" and has been leading a resistance movement under the name of "The Wrench".
| 22 | 9 | "Inside Man" | John Fang | Matt Wayne | December 12, 2008 | 680-024 |
The team rescues a young man named Tyler, who stole the Oscillator Key for the Highbreed's hyperspace gateway from Los Soledad. He crashed the truck and suffered memory loss as he escaped. After being almost captured by the DNAliens in a small town, the team saves him and are forced to race the DNAliens to track down the device, resulting in a battle. The team is victorious, but they discover that Tyler is actually a DNAlien, having managed to resist the Xenocyte controlling him, and only looked human through the use of an ID Mask.
| 23 | 10 | "Birds of a Feather" | Dan Riba | Stan Berkowitz | March 24, 2009 | 680-019 |
An Arachnichimp (Spidermonkey's race), Simian, needs help in retrieving a crystal which is supposedly the symbol of the monarchy on his planet. Ben offers his help, but Kevin and Gwen are skeptical. In the midst of the battle, Ben discovers that Simian has been lying, and that the crystal is actually powering an intergalactic communications station. By stealing it, Simian will prevent Earth from calling for help against the Highbreed invasion.
| 24 | 11 | "Unearthed" | Butch Lukic | Charlotte Fullerton | March 25, 2009 | 680-022 |
A DNAlien mining operation under Los Soledad uncovers an alien spacecraft, from which a large alien creature, nicknamed Tiny, is released. It wanders around the nearby town collecting random items, eventually attracting the attention of Ben, Gwen, and Kevin. After a short battle, they realize that the alien is in fact a baby girl. The alien perceives Gwen as an Anodite and hangs on her every word. Needing to return the baby alien to her parents, the team follows her back to her ship.
| 25 | 12 | "War of the Worlds, Part 1" | Dan Riba | Dwayne McDuffie | March 27, 2009 | 680-025 |
Paradox and Azmuth arrive on Earth to warn Ben of the approaching Highbreed fleet. Gwen and Kevin gather all the allies they've met to counter the threat. Meanwhile, Azmuth reveals to Ben that the Omnitrix contains the DNA of every sentient species in the galaxy, 1,000,910 in total, and unlocks the Master Control so Ben can effectively combat the Highbreed. Omnitrix alien debuts: Cannonbolt, Upchuck, Way Big
| 26 | 13 | "War of the Worlds, Part 2" | Butch Lukic | Dwayne McDuffie | March 27, 2009 | 680-026 |
The team has to get to the captain of the fleet, on the Highbreed head ship to stop the invasion. Ben, Gwen and Kevin quickly head to the captain of the fleet. The Highbreed commander and the team fight. The trio is then surrounded by a group of DNAliens, but are saved by Grandpa Max, Pierce, Helen, Manny, and one Null Guardian, who have regained control over the Null Void. Ben, Gwen, Kevin, Azmuth, and Ship as a spaceship head to the Augstaka, which is the homeworld of the Highbreed to confront the Highbreed Supreme after the commander tells them that he is the only one who can call off the war. When they get to Augstaka, they are captured. Ben escapes his confinement by transforming into Humungousaur. The team breaks out and confronts the Highbreed Supreme in person. Ben uses the Omnitrix to detect genetic damage in all the Highbreed. It sends out a pulse which attaches Omnitrix alien DNA to every Highbreed. The Highbreed Supreme is disgusted by Ben's action, and considers mass suicide as the species' only dignified exit. Before he can follow through, Reinrassig III comes in and tells the Highbreed Supreme that this genetic recombination has allowed their species to survive. Reinrassig, whose Methanosian DNA has grown further up his right arm, is otherwise unaffected by the genetic recombination. Seeing Reinrassig's firsthand knowledge of introducing additional DNA, the Highbreed Supreme steps down and names Reinrassig the new Highbreed Supreme. With this, Ben asks Reinrassig to call off the war, which he does. The two shake hands before they depart. Back on Earth, Gwen tells everyone that Darkstar escaped, to which Ben replies that they will find him later. Ben discovers that the Master Control got shut off. When he asks Azmuth how to turn it back on, Azmuth smiles and tells him to have fun figuring it out. He teleports away, leaving Ben free to try out a new alien that just emerged. Omnitrix alien debuts: Lodestar (off-screen).

=== Season 3 (2009–10) ===
| No. overall | No. in season | Title | Directed by | Written by | Original release date | Prod. code |
|---|---|---|---|---|---|---|
| 27 | 1 | "Vengeance of Vilgax, Part 1" | Dan Riba | Dwayne McDuffie | September 11, 2009 | 689-001 |
Vilgax, an alien warlord and Ben's old arch-nemesis from the original series, arrives on Earth demanding that Ben face him in a Conqueror's Challenge, in which they will battle one-on-one to determine the fate of the Earth. Vilgax has already conquered ten planets via this method, using a device to absorb the powers of those worlds' greatest warriors in the process. Ben, having grown self-obsessed due to his newfound galactic fame following his defeat of the Highbreed, is unconcerned by Vilgax's threat, despite Vilgax defeating both Max and the Plumbers' Helpers. Kevin decides to hack the Omnitrix in an attempt to activate the Master Control to make Ben powerful enough to defeat Vilgax, but Azmuth contacts them and warns them against it. Despite Azmuth's warning, Ben reactivates Kevin's machine, resulting in an explosion which destroys Kevin's garage.: This was preceded by the Alien Swarm movie, which takes place a few weeks before this two-part Season 3 premiere
| 28 | 2 | "Vengeance of Vilgax, Part 2" | Butch Lukic | Dwayne McDuffie | September 11, 2009 | 689-002 |
In the wake of the explosion, Ben discovers that several of his alien forms have been unleashed from the Omnitrix and are now roaming freely; additionally, Kevin has been irreversibly mutated into a mineral form. The team attempts to recover Ben's lost alien forms (including Chromastone, Spidermonkey, and Goop), while Gwen and Kevin chastise Ben for his recklessness. The team attempts to track down Way Big, the last missing alien, but Ben runs out of time and is forced to face Vilgax. Vilgax nearly defeats Ben, but Gwen and Kevin arrive with Way Big, whom Ben absorbs back into the Omnitrix. However, Ben accidentally turns into Chromastone instead, and is destroyed by Vilgax. However, the Omnitrix absorbs Chromastone's shattered pieces back into itself, transforming Ben into Diamondhead. Due to his skill and experience with Diamondhead, Ben easily defeats Vilgax, and he departs the planet in defeat. Omnitrix alien debuts: Diamondhead
| 29 | 3 | "Inferno" | John Fang | Len Uhley | September 18, 2009 | 689-003 |
Ben, Gwen, and Kevin discover that Vulkanus is planning to drill to the Earth's very core after encountering mutated cattle that are attracted to consuming rock and stone; the very earthly materials Kevin is covered in since instinctively absorbing the Omnitrix's powerful energy.
| 30 | 4 | "Fool's Gold" | Dan Riba | Eugene Son | September 25, 2009 | 689-006 |
An alien named Orb asks Ben, Gwen and Kevin to help locate his missing best friend, Decka from a greedy mayor named Coleman, who is using him to pay off his debts in gold poop. Later, it is revealed that his species lived in Mars that they refer to as "The Popcorn Planet" sometime in the past and turned it into the Red Planet when one or more members of his kind accidentally ingested meat, causing them to revert to their primal forms and become giant and hostile. When Mayor Coleman feeds Decka meat, it is up to Ben and his team to help Orb save Decka by helping him restore to his normal self again. Ben uses Echo Echo, who is made of silicon, which poisons him and turns him back to normal.
| 31 | 5 | "Simple" | Butch Lukic | Stan Berkowitz | October 9, 2009 | 689-005 |
Ben is contacted by a little alien girl named Probity who asks him to resolve an ongoing war on her home planet. Despite Kevin and Gwen's reservations, Ben insists they travel to the planet, which they discovered is divided between two warring factions - blue and red - both of which claim that they are merely defending themselves from the other side. Ben eventually learns that the war began over controversy about whether the aliens' idol, Zabin, was red or blue. Ben eventually resorts to capturing the leaders of both factions and insisting that they stop their fighting, but they escape and resume the war. Ben finally intervenes as Way Big, announcing his intention to stay on the planet as long as necessary to ensure peace. However, he accidentally destroys a statue of Zabin, outraging the aliens. The alien factions unite to attack Ben and his team, who flee the planet in shame. Later, Ben receives a message from Probity, who declares that she no longer has a home and now hates Ben more than war. Omnitrix alien debuts: Lodestar
| 32 | 6 | "Vreedle, Vreedle" | John Fang | Charlotte Fullerton | October 16, 2009 | 689-004 |
Ben and Kevin try to thwart rep o-men sent to return Ship to his maker, Baz-l, and appeal to a judge to rescind his ruling. Ship and Julie merge to form a protective battle suit.
| 33 | 7 | "Singlehanded" | Dan Riba | Marty Isenberg | October 23, 2009 | 689-007 |
A bounty hunter who's after the Omnitrix sends Ben to the Null Void, but his left hand remains on Earth.
| 34 | 8 | "If All Else Fails" | Butch Lukic | Adam Beechen | November 6, 2009 | 689-008 |
Ben, Gwen, Max, and Kevin have to thwart a Highbreed fail-safe, which gets accidentally set off.
| 35 | 9 | "In Charm's Way" | John Fang and Rick Morales | Peter David | November 13, 2009 | 689-009 |
The silver-haired sorceress Charmcaster returns and gets Kevin to help her to defeat Gwen.
| 36 | 10 | "Ghost Town" | Dan Riba | Nicole Dubuc | November 20, 2009 | 689-011 |
Vilgax attacks a containment facility near a star imprisoning Zs'Skayr ("Ghostfreak"), demanding that he tell him the secrets of the Omnitrix in exchange for his freedom. Zs'Skayr complies, but betrays Vilgax upon his release, traveling to his homeworld of Vilgaxia and converting the planet's populace into hive mind Ectonurite minions. Vilgax flees to Earth and begs Ben for help, who reluctantly complies. Vilgax leads the team to his home planet, where they enter Vilgax's citadel and confront Zs'Skayr. Ben tricks Zs'Skayr into entering his body and attempts to control him with the Omnitrix, but Zs'Skayr seizes control instead. Vilgax is able to weaken Zs'Skayr long enough for Ben to regain control and revert to his human form, defeating him and freeing Vilgax's people. Ben and his team depart from Vilgaxia, while Vilgax looks on, gloating that he now knows the secrets of the Omnitrix. Omnitrix alien debuts: Ghostfreak
| 37 | 11 | "Trade Off" | Butch Lukic | Len Wein | December 4, 2009 | 689-010 |
Kevin teams up with Darkstar to retrieve an artifact called Dominus Librium that could cure both of them. After getting cured, he meets Ben and Gwen, who are surprised to see him cured. Gwen gets suspicious where she learns about Darkstar's deal and arrives at his warehouse. Darkster begins to absorbs Gwen's powers, but Kevin steps in front of the Dominus Librium and grabs it in order to send all of the energy back, thus restoring Gwen's powers and turning Kevin and Darkstar back to their mutating forms. As Darkstar runs away with the destroyed Dominus Librium, Gwen, Kevin and Ben leave to have a drink at Mr. Smoothy.
| 38 | 12 | "Busy Box" | Rick Morales | Jake Black | December 11, 2009 | 689-012 |
Ben, Gwen, and Kevin battle an alien's toy which proves to be very dangerous.
| 39 | 13 | "Con of Rath" | Dan Riba | Len Uhley | January 8, 2010 | 689-013 |
Ben and the team are contacted by representatives of the planet Lewoda, who ask Ben to partake in a peace mission to deliver a baby Lewodan, the Tiffin, to their enemies, the Pantophage. While Gwen and Kevin are skeptical of the mission, the Lewodan ambassador, Zaw-Veenul, insists that it is merely a show of trust between the two species. The team travels into space using a ship provided by the Lewodans. During the trip, the Tiffin causes the Omnitrix to transform Ben into Rath, an aggressive and short-tempered alien of the Appoplexian species. With Ben unable to revert to his human form, Rath causes trouble throughout the journey to the Pantophage planet, including encounters with Argit, the Vreedle Brothers, the Incurseans, and Vulkanus. Eventually, the team reaches the Pantophage home world, and present the Tiffin to the Pantophage leader, Jarett. To their horror, Jarett unceremoniously eats the Tiffin, claiming that it is a rare delicacy. Rath, outraged, forces his way down Jarett's throat to rescue the Tiffin, and threatens to do so again if Jarett starts a war with the Lewodans. Leaving the planet, the team encounters Zaw-Veenul again, and after he admits that he knew Jarett's intention, Rath tells him to never speak to him again. The Lewodans depart with the Tiffin, and Ben reverts to his human form. Omnitrix alien debuts: Rath
| 40 | 14 | "Primus" | Butch Lukic | Charlotte Fullerton | January 15, 2010 | 689-014 |
Ben, Gwen, and Kevin get transported by the Omnitrix to a strange new planet where they encounter Vilgax and Azmuth, who reveals the true purpose of the Omnitrix and that of the whole planet.
| 41 | 15 | "Time Heals" | Rick Morales | Len Uhley | January 22, 2010 | 689-018 |
Gwen attempts to use a spell to travel back in time to prevent the accident in "Vengeance of Vilgax," thus preventing Kevin's permanent mutation. Before she departs, she is warned by Paradox of the consequences of altering history, but ignores him. Gwen is able to convince her past self to prevent Kevin from hacking the Omnitrix, but upon returning to the present, she discovers that Bellwood has been taken over by Hex and Charmcaster. Gwen encounters Paradox, who explains that by removing Kevin's mutation and thus his new abilities, she prevented him from being able to defeat Hex. Consequently, Charmcaster killed Gwen, captured Ben, and enslaved Kevin, and Hex took over the city. Gwen reaches Hex's citadel and frees Ben, who buys her enough time to cast a spell to return to the past, where she prevents herself from stopping the experiment. She returns to a repaired present and greets Ben and Kevin; they encounter Paradox again, who tells them that "Everything is fine."
| 42 | 16 | "The Secret of Chromastone" | Dan Riba | Rich Fogel | January 29, 2010 | 689-016 |
A sick Ben is happy to see an old friend Tetrax but finds out he has plans of his own.
| 43 | 17 | "Above and Beyond" | Butch Lukic | Eugene Son | March 12, 2010 | 689-015 |
The Plumbers' Helpers see a video of Ben threatening to kill Max. Manny, Helen, Pierce, and Alan go to the Plumber Station to find out what's happening. When they got there they see a video of Max saying to work as a team, Helen wanders off to look for Max, but gets defeated by Ben. Ben also defeats Manny and Pierce, while in the battle with Alan, the other Plumbers Helpers joins the fight to defeat Ben, but he escapes. The Plumbers agree to work as a team, by doing so the defeat Ben and eject him into space as Humongusaur. Max and Ben appears to the ship and tells the Plumbers that it was a test to see their teamwork skills and tells them that they will be going to Plumbers Academy.
| 44 | 18 | "Vendetta" | Rick Morales | Len Wein | March 19, 2010 | 689-017 |
Kevin goes on a crusade to find an escaped alien named Ragnarok in order to avenge his father Devin Levin's death. Ben and Gwen learn about Kevin's past from Max, who was Devin's partner in the plumbers, where they also accompany Kevin. The trio learn about Ragnarok's plan of destroying the world by draining the sun rays. Leaving Ben and Gwen, Kevin manages to foil Ragnarok's plan and finishes him, thus avenging his father's death.
| 45 | 19 | "The Final Battle, Part 1" | Dan Riba | Dwayne McDuffie | March 26, 2010 | 689-019 |
On Galvan Prime, Azmuth is told that his greatest invention, a greater and more effective Omnitrix-like device called the Ultimatrix, has been stolen. Investigating security footage, Azmuth learns that the thief is Albedo, who has entered an allegiance with Vilgax with the intention of defeating Ben and taking the Omnitrix. Albedo uses the Ultimatrix to attack and kidnap Gwen and Kevin, and sends a message to Ben demanding that he face him if he wants to see them alive again. In a confrontation, Albedo reveals that he has modified the Ultimatrix to artificially evolve his transformations into their "ultimate forms", enormously enhancing their abilities. Albedo transforms into Ultimate Humungousaur and easily defeats Ben, and Vilgax appears with an army of robotic bioids. Vilgax demands that Ben give him the Omnitrix in exchange for his friends' lives, and Ben reluctantly does so, to Vilgax's delight. Ultimatrix alien debuts: Ultimate Humungousaur (By Albedo)
| 46 | 20 | "The Final Battle, Part 2" | Butch Lukic | Dwayne McDuffie | March 26, 2010 | 689-020 |
Max rescues Ben, Gwen, and Kevin from Vilgax and Albedo, and the trio flee the scene. Vilgax betrays Albedo and keeps the Omnitrix for himself, revealing that his bioid army is synchronized to the Omnitrix and can transform into aliens on demand. To demonstrate, Vilgax transforms his army into a swarm of Humungousaurs, who attack and subdue Albedo. Ben, watching this unfold from Max's cameras, is ashamed of himself for giving Vilgax the Omnitrix, and rushes off into the woods. Azmuth appears before a dejected Ben, initially chastising him for his foolish decisions, but then hinting at a means of defeating Vilgax. Ben and the team teleport to Vilgax's ship, where Ben instructs the Omnitrix to self-destruct, crippling Vilgax's bioid army and reverting Kevin to normal, but destroying the Omnitrix in the process. As the team confronts Vilgax, Ben turns on the Ultimatrix's self-destruct, forcing Albedo to give him the Ultimatrix to turn it off. Ben, now armed with the Ultimatrix, battles Vilgax. Vilgax destroys his ship's console, setting it on a collision course with Bellwood, but Gwen and Max are able to steer the ship into the ocean. Vilgax transforms into a monstrous, giant squid-like form and drags Ben underwater with him as the others escape, but Ben emerges at the last minute before the ship explodes. Ben declares that, if Vilgax ever returns, they will defeat him together. Ultimatrix alien debuts: Ultimate Swampfire (By Ben)

== Short (2009) ==
| Title | Directed by | Written by | Original release date |
|---|---|---|---|
| "Peter Kay's All Animated Stars" | Tim Harper | Peter Kay | November 21, 2009 |
Big Chris leads a chorus of characters from various animated children's television shows in a medley of seven songs including Ben Tennyson on a computer screen singing.

== Film (2009) ==
| Title | Directed by | Written by | Original release date |
|---|---|---|---|
| "Ben 10: Alien Swarm (Note: This movie takes place between Season 2 and Season 3.)" | Alex Winter | John Turman and James Krieg | November 25, 2009 |
Elena, a childhood friend of both Ben and Gwen, as well as a Plumber's kid, returns to explain that her father has been abducted and that she needs their help. Omnitrix alien debuts: Nanomech

== See also ==
- List of Ben 10 (2005–2008) episodes
- List of Ben 10: Ultimate Alien episodes
- List of Ben 10: Omniverse episodes
- List of Ben 10 (2016–2021) episodes
