= Marty Isenberg =

American screenwriter (born 1963)

Martin Elliot Isenberg (born 1963) is an American animation writer. He is best known for his role as co-story editor on Beast Machines and Transformers: Animated, and for his work on the 2003 Teenage Mutant Ninja Turtles series. He also wrote or co-wrote scripts for Ben 10, Danny Phantom, Gargoyles, Batman: The Animated Series, Action Man, Beetlejuice, The Mask, G.I. Joe: Renegades, X-Men: The Animated Series and Spider-Man: The Animated Series. From 1991–2003, he frequently collaborated with Robert N. Skir.

== Personal life ==
Isenberg grew up in Pompton Lakes, New Jersey, and attended Pompton Lakes High School, where he was honored for his participation in the marching band. He graduated from Northwestern University in 1985 with a Bachelor of Science in speech and won the Agnes Nixon Playwriting Award for a full length play that year. He later graduated from the University of Southern California in 1989 with a master's degree in professional writing. Isenberg is married and has two children.

== Screenwriting credits ==
=== Television ===
• series head writer denoted in bold

- Beetlejuice (1991)
- Little Shop (1991)
- Batman: The Animated Series (1992, 1994)
- Dog City (1992-1994)
- The Legends of Treasure Island (1993)
- Stone Protectors (1993)
- X-Men: The Animated Series (1993-1994)
- Red Planet (1994)
- Spider-Man: The Animated Series (1994, 1996-1997)
- BattleTech: The Animated Series (1995)
- **Ultraforce** (1995): eps 10-13
- Gargoyles (1996)
- Superman: The Animated Series (1996)
- The Mask: Animated Series (1996)
- **Mighty Ducks: The Animated Series** (1996-1997)
- Extreme Ghostbusters (1997)
- The Adventures of Sam & Max: Freelance Police (1997-1998)
- Pocket Dragon Adventures (1998)
- **Godzilla: The Series** (1998-2000)
- **Beast Machines: Transformers** (1999-2000)
- **Action Man** (2000-2001)
- The Mummy (2001, 2003)
- Teenage Mutant Ninja Turtles (2003-2006)
- Danny Phantom (2004-2006)
- Jackie Chan Adventures (2005)
- A.T.O.M. (2005-2006)
- Yin Yang Yo! (2006)
- Ben 10 (2006-2007)
- Legion of Super Heroes (2007)
- The Replacements (2007)
- **Transformers: Animated** (2007-2009)
- Ben 10: Alien Force (2009)
- Storm Hawks (2009)
- Ben 10: Ultimate Alien (2010)
- Generator Rex (2010)
- **G.I. Joe: Renegades** (2010-2011)
- Monsuno (2012)
- Transformers: Prime (2012)
- Transformers: Rescue Bots (2012, 2014-2015)
- **Kaijudo** (2012-2013): season 2 head writer
- Ben 10: Omniverse (2012-2014)
- Imaginext Adventures (2014)
- Max Steel (2014)
- Hulk and the Agents of S.M.A.S.H. (2014-2015)
- Ultimate Spider-Man (2014-2016)
- **Guardians of the Galaxy** (2015-2019)
- Woody Woodpecker (2018)
- Spider-Man (2020)

=== Film ===
- Atlantis: Milo’s Return (2003)
- Ben 10: Destroy All Aliens (2012)
- Hulk: Where Monsters Dwell (2016)
