= Ben 10/Generator Rex: Heroes United =

Crossover episode between Ben 10: Ultimate Alien and Generator Rex

- Ben 10: Ultimate Alien and Generator Rex episode
- Directed by: Chris Graham; Kenji Ono
- Written by: Man of Action
- Original air date: November 25, 2011
- Running time: 43 minutes (2 parts)

"Ben 10/Generator Rex: Heroes United" is an extended crossover special between Ben 10: Ultimate Alien and Generator Rex. It takes the form of an extended episode of Generator Rex, with it having an appearance of Ben Tennyson from Ben 10: Ultimate Alien and it being written by Man of Action, the creator of both animated series. Heroes United aired on November 25, 2011, on Cartoon Network, taking up a one-hour time block.

As a special event, it premiered at New York Comic Con 2011. Heroes United was universally acclaimed by fans of both series, and has hit the top 100 on iTunes.

This special is the second Cartoon Network crossover after the 2007 crossover special, The Grim Adventures of the KND. The events of the crossover specials take place during the third and final season of Generator Rex, and during the third and final season of Ben 10: Ultimate Alien.

== Plot ==
A mysterious rift begins to open in the skies of Manhattan. Meanwhile, former agent of peacekeeping organization, Providence, Rex Salazar is sparring against fellow agent, Agent Six, while musing about his need for a theme song, before getting the alert about the rift. Providence appears on the scene to stop the rift, but are unable to do anything before Rex arrives with Six and Bobo. Doctor Holiday, scientist and love interest of Agent Six, then gets a scan that shows something is coming through the rift, and Rex finds himself (unknowingly) fighting against Ben Tennyson, in the form of Humungousaur. During their skirmish, a strange metallic creature also appears and heads into the city, with Bobo and Six on its trail. Continuing their fight across New York, Ben switches to Diamondhead, Lodestar and finally Rath as Rex continues to try curing him, believing him to be an EVO mutated by rogue nanites which he deals with on a regular basis; an annoyed Ben demands Rex stop as he doesn't even know what an EVO is. Changing back to human form, Ben is shocked that no one has heard of him despite being a celebrity back home. Then, Six appears with the creature, which self-destructs and renders him comatose, leaving Rex mortified and angered at Ben.

At Rex's hideout, Ben is locked up in a containment unit, while Doctor Holiday explains that the creature was nanite in origin, but somehow completely different from an EVO, and that Ben did not appear to have any nanites present in his body before his fight with Rex. Ben offers to help deal with the creature but is denied, and easily escapes into the night as Big Chill. Rex chases after Ben and both are confronted by Caesar, who explains the creature's origin, saying that he created the creature (named "Alpha") as a means of manufacturing nanites that could adapt for any scientific need, but it became rogue as it developed sentience and tried to possess human bodies due to its inability to hold a physical form within a machine, forcing Caesar to banish it to another dimension. However, Ben deduces that Caesar actually sent Alpha into the Null Void, a prison dimension for intergalactic criminals that the Plumbers capture, allowing Alpha to obtain a physical form within a cyborg alien and find its way back to Manhattan. Alpha invades to absorb EVOs for their nanites, hoping to gain control of Rex's as it knows he holds the key to it obtaining perfection: the Omega Nanite.

Back at base, Ben and Rex explain each other's origins, as White Knight reveals that Alpha has gone to the Bug Jar, a quarantined city full of EVOs for it to absorb. Rex, White Knight, and Ben arrive, only to find themselves against the nearly invincible Alpha, which begins to attack to take control of Rex's Omega Nanite. Ben fights as XLR8 and Four Arms. During the battle, Ben gains the form of Shocksquatch, but then temporarily loses his powers when Alpha copies the Ultimatrix and takes on Nanite powered versions of Heatblast, Four Arms, and Humungousaur. After a tough battle, Rex is able to disable Alpha's imitation Ultimatrix powers, but is ensnared and robbed of his Omega Nanite, leading Alpha to transform into a colossal being calling itself Alpha-Omega; the beginning and the end. As the now nearly unstoppable Alpha-Omega rampages, Rex has doubts about himself now that most of his builds are gone. Ben however comes up with a plan, and transforms into Upgrade and merges with Rex, enhancing any machines that Rex generates. The duo then take on the Alpha-Omega, weakening it enough for Rex to condense Alpha into a sphere of matter that weighs several tons. As Alpha is being condensed, Caesar appears and extracts the Omega Nanite. Attempting to dispose of Alpha, Caesar then opens a rift for Ben, who changes into Upchuck and devours the compacted Alpha as he heads back to his world. Rex returns to base one last time to find that Agent Six has fully recovered. Caesar injects the Omega Nanite back into Rex. Alpha, now in the Null Void, stirs within its prison of matter, hinting that it will return.

== Cast ==
- Daryl Sabara as Rex Salazar
- Yuri Lowenthal as Ben Tennyson, Upgrade
- Wally Kurth as Agent Six
- Grey DeLisle as Rebecca Holiday, Diane Farrah, Young Woman
- John DiMaggio as Bobo Haha, Rath, Black Pawn
- J. K. Simmons as White Knight
- Michael Emerson as Alpha
- Jennifer Hale as Black Knight
- Freddy Rodriguez as Caesar Salazar
- David Kaye as Shocksquatch
- Dee Bradley Baker as Humungousaur, Diamondhead, Lodestar, Big Chill, Upchuck

== Production ==
Heroes United is the double-length third and fourth episodes of Generator Rex's third season. As it is set in Generator Rex's fictional universe and depicts Ben crossing over into it from his own world, Ben, his various aliens and other characters from Ben 10: Ultimate Alien appear in Generator Rex's art and animation style when in Rex's universe. Other main characters of Ultimate Alien such as Gwen Tennyson, Kevin Levin and Max Tennyson do not make a full physical appearance (but they are drawn in Generator Rex style), only to be seen in a flashback scene where Rex and Ben exchange backstories.

== See also ==
- The Grim Adventures of the KND
- Cartoon Network: Punch Time Explosion
