= Man of Action Entertainment =

American animation company

- Formerly: Man of Action Studios (1998–1999)
- Type: Private
- Founded: 1998; 28 years ago
- Founders: John Keneta, Maurice Augunda, Joe Kelly, Duncan Rouleau, Joe Casey, Steven T. Seagle
- Headquarters: Los Angeles, California, United States
- Members: John Keneta (1998–2016); Maurice Augunda (1998–2016); Joe Kelly; Duncan Rouleau; Joe Casey; Steven T. Seagle
- Website: manofaction.tv

Man of Action Entertainment (previously Man of Action Studios) is an American writer collective working on various brands of media ranging from comic books, and animation. The studio is best known for their animated action shows, superhero, live action films, and serial novels and comics, such as Ben 10, Generator Rex, Secret Saturdays, Gormiti Nature Unleashed, and Big Hero 6.

Man of Action was founded in 1998. It is owned and operated by creators, executive producers, writers and comic book creator/writers John Keneta, Maurice Augunda, Joe Kelly, Duncan Rouleau, Joe Casey, Steven T. Seagle. until John Keneta and Maurice Augunda departured in 2016.

== List of works ==
=== TV series ===
Title	First year	Last year	Co-production with	Channels
Ben 10	2005	2021	Cartoon Network Studios	Cartoon Network
Generator Rex	2010	2013	Cartoon Network Studios	Cartoon Network
The Avengers: Earth's Mightiest Heroes	2010	2012	Marvel Animation; Film Roman	Disney XD
Gormiti Nature Unleashed	2012	2014	Giochi Preziosi; Mondo TV	Cartoon Network
Ultimate Spider-Man	2012	2017	Marvel Animation	Disney XD
Monsuno	2012	2014	Jakks Pacific; Dentsu Entertainment Inc. The Topps Company; Larx Entertainment; FremantleMedia North America	Nicktoons (USA); TV Tokyo (Japan)
Marvel's Avengers Assemble	2013	2019	Marvel Animation	Disney XD
Zak Storm	2016	2018	Zagtoon; Method Animation; De Agostini Editore; SAMG Animation; MNC Animation	Discovery Family
Fruit Ninja: Frenzy Force	2016	2017	Kickstand Entertainment; Toonz Media Group; Halfbrick Studios	YouTube Red
Big Hero 6: The Series	2017	2021	Disney Television Animation	Disney Channel; Disney XD
Mega Man: Fully Charged	2018	2019	Capcom; Dentsu Entertainment; WildBrain Studios	Cartoon Network (USA); WildBrainTV (Canada)
Bakugan Battle Planet	2018	2023	TMS Entertainment; Spin Master Entertainment; Nelvana	Cartoon Network (USA; 2018-2021); Netflix (USA; 2021-2023); Teletoon (Canada; 2018-2023); Cartoon Network (Canada; 2023)
Power Players	2019	2020	Zagtoon; France Télévisions; Playmates Toys; Method Animation; Globosat	Cartoon Network (USA)
Hello Neighbor: Welcome To Raven Brooks	2022	present	TinyBuild; Creation Station; Animasia Studio	YouTube
Sonic Prime	2022	2024	Sega of America; WildBrain Studios; Netflix Animation	Netflix
Upcoming
JumpScare	TBA	TBA	Scholastic Entertainment; Mainframe Studios	TBA

=== Films ===
Title	Directed by	Co-production with	Distributor	Year
Ben 10: Secret of the Omnitrix	Danny Boyle; David Silverman	Cartoon Network Studios	Cartoon Network	2007
Ben 10: Race Against Time	Alex Winter	Warner Premiere; Cartoon Network Studios; Trouper Productions	Cartoon Network	2007
Ben 10: Alien Swarm	Alex Winter	Warner Premiere; Cartoon Network Studios; Trouper Productions	Cartoon Network	2009
Hit Parade	Joe Casey	—N/a	Ariztical Entertainment (USA); Push Films (International)	2010
Ben 10/Generator Rex: Heroes United	Kenji Ono; Chris Graham	Cartoon Network Studios	Cartoon Network	2011
Ben 10: Destroy All Aliens	Victor Cook	Cartoon Network Studios; Tiny Island Productions	Cartoon Network	2012
Big Hero 6	Don Hall; Chris Williams	Walt Disney Animation Studios	Walt Disney Studios Motion Pictures	2014
Officer Downe	Shawn Crahan	Living Out Loud Films; Traverse Media; Blackmrkt Incorporated	Magnolia Pictures	2016
I Kill Giants	Anders Walter	1492 Pictures; Ocean Blue Entertainment; XYZ Films uMedia; Parallel Films; Adonais Productions	RLJE Films (USA); Kaleidoscope Film Distribution (UK)	2017
Ben 10: Versus the Universe	Arthur Henrique Nazareth; John McIntyre	Cartoon Network Studios	Warner Bros. Home Entertainment	2020
Ben 10: Ben 10,010	Henrique Jardim	Cartoon Network Studios	Cartoon Network	2021
Ben Gen 10	Henrique Jardim	Cartoon Network Studios	Cartoon Network	2021
Ben 10: Alien X-Tinction	Henrique Jardim	Cartoon Network Studios	Cartoon Network	2021

==== Upcoming ====
Title	Directed by	Co-production with	Distributor	Year
Sky & Luna	Duncan Rouleau	POC Studios; Creation Station; Composition Media	TBA	TBA

=== Comic/Graphic novels ===
Title	Writer	Publishing company
"Hell Cop"	Joe Casey	Image
"Codeflesh"	Joe Casey	Image
"Gødland"	Joe Casey	Image
"Nixon's Pals"	Joe Casey	Image
"Krash Bastards"	Joe Casey	Image
"Charlatan Ball"	Joe Casey	Image
"Officer Downe"	Joe Casey	Image
"Full Moon Fever"	Joe Casey	Image
"The Milkman Murders"	Joe Casey	Image
"Ziggy Marley's Marijuanaman"	Joe Casey	Image
"Rock Bottom"	Joe Casey	Image
"Butcher Baker, Righteous Maker"	Joe Casey	Image
"Doc Bizarre M.D."	Joe Casey	Image
"The Bounce"	Joe Casey	Image
"Sex"	Joe Casey	Image
"Steampunk"	Joe Casey	Image
"M. Rex"	Joe Kelly	Image
"I Kill Giants"	Joe Kelly	Image
"Four Eyes"	Joe Kelly	Image
"Douglas Fredericks and The House of They"	Joe Kelly	Image
"Bad Dog"	Joe Kelly	Image
"M. Rex"	Duncan Rouleau	Image
"The Nightmarist"	Duncan Rouleau	Image
"The Great Unknown"	Duncan Rouleau	Image
"Soul Kiss"	Steven T. Seagle	Image
"Big Hero 6"	Steven T. Seagle	Marvel
"Kafka"	Steven T. Seagle	Image
"House of Secrets"	Steven T. Seagle	Vertigo
"Solstice"	Steven T. Seagle	Image
"American Virgin"	Steven T. Seagle	Image
"The Amazon"	Steven T. Seagle	Vertigo
"The Crusades"	Steven T. Seagle	Image
"Read Diary"	Steven T. Seagle	Image
"Genius"	Steven T. Seagle	First Second
"Imperial"	Steven T. Seagle	Image
"Get Naked"	Steven T. Seagle	Image
"Camp Midnight"	Steven T. Seagle	Image
"Camp Midnight vs. Camp Daybright"	Steven T. Seagle	Image
"Ben 10"	Joe Casey	Dynamite

=== Video games ===
Title	Co-developed with	Publisher	Platforms	Year
Darksiders 3	Gunfire Games	THQ Nordic	Nintendo Switch; PlayStation 4 Stadia; Windows; Xbox One	2018
The Quiet Man	Human Head Studios	Square Enix	PlayStation 4 Windows	2018
Metal Slug: Awakening	TiMi Studio Group	HaoPlay Limited	Android iOS; Windows	2023
Metal Slug Tactics	Leikir Studios	Dotemu	Nintendo Switch; PlayStation 4 PlayStation 5 Windows; Xbox One; Xbox Series X/S	2024
