= Death Seed =

Death Seed may refer to:

- Death Seed, a fictional location associated with Clan Akkaba in the Marvel universe
- Death Seed, a fictional location associated with Celestials in the Marvel universe
- Death Seed, a 2000 album by Guapo with Ruins and The Shock Exchange
- "Death Seed", a 2024 song by Funker Vogt
- Mrityubeej (মৃত্যুবীজ, 'Death Seed'), a 2002 book featuring Masud Rana
