= Hamilton Slade =

Hamilton Slade may refer to:

- Phantom Rider (Hamilton Slade), a fictional Marvel comic book character that first appeared in the series Ghost Rider
- Hamilton Slade (mutant), a fictional Marvel comic book character that first appeared in the series X-Men: Apocalypse/Dracula
