= Brian Haberlin =

American comic book artist

- Haberlin at Dragon Con in 2026
- Born: 1963 (age 62–63) Hawaii, U.S.
- Areas: Writer, Penciller, Inker, Editor, Colourist
- Notable works: Witchblade

Brian Haberlin (/ˈheɪbərlɪn/; born 1963) is an American comic book artist, writer, editor and producer. He is best known as the co-creator of the Witchblade franchise and for his digital art style.

== Career ==
Haberlin was born in Hawaii and raised in La Cañada Flintridge, California, where he soon grew an interest in drawing. By high school, Haberlin's friends turned him into comic books, introducing him to John Byrne's work on Uncanny X-Men and Frank Miller on Daredevil, along with older artists such as Jim Starlin, Jim Steranko, John Buscema and Barry Smith. By the age of 18, Marvel Comics was already offering Haberlin a job as a penciller, which he refused because "the pay was terrible, you had to move to New York and they wouldn't promise consistent work."

He then attended film school at Loyola Marymount University, earning an MA at screenwriting, and starting a career at Lorimar/Warner Brothers Television. Haberlin eventually gave up his job at Warner Brothers in order to pursue a career in comics, particularly as many independent publishers were establishing themselves in the West Coast, meaning he could remain in California. In 1993, Haberlin took advantage of a table a friend got at San Diego Comic-Con to showcase his 3D computer graphics work, bringing a heavy desktop computer and a large inkjet print of some Green Lantern art he did. Haberlin's work impressed many artists and brought work offers, including by the Image Comics crew, which landed him a job at their partner Top Cow Productions, where Haberlin eventually served as Vice President of Creative Affairs. At Top Cow, which then shared an office with WildStorm, he co-created Witchblade, prompted by the lack of realistic female superheroes in comics. The Witchblade franchise has since expanded to include multiple spin-offs, a live action television series, an anime, and an upcoming film adaptation.

Despite Haberlin intending to work as a penciller, he rose to fame in the comics industry as a colorist given his knowledge of computer coloring processes. Haberlin formed his own studio in 1995, producing commercial illustrations and digitally coloring for Marvel Comics, DC Comics and Image Comics. He then started Avalon Studios with Whilce Portacio in 1998. Avalon Studios published Stone, a fantasy series which incorporated elements of Filipino mythology, Area 52, a science fiction title set to be adapted into a feature film, with a tentative release date of 2013, and M. Rex, which has been adapted into the successful Cartoon Network series Generator Rex.

Haberlin became Editor in Chief for Todd McFarlane Productions in 2006, and penciled and inked its flagship title, Spawn, for two years during David Hine's run as writer.

Haberlin currently runs Digitalarttutorials.com, where he produces art tutorials, teaches at Minneapolis College of Art and Design, and is partner in Anomaly Productions, producing graphic novels and children's books. In February 2012 he will debut a 3D comic aimed at children called Captain Wonder. Anomaly Productions is currently working on a 300 plus page graphic novel entitled Anomaly. The book, co-written with Hollywood lawyer Skip Brittenham, utilizes augmented reality technology and interacts with iPad, iPhone, and Android mobile devices. The book is set for release in October 2012.

Haberlin is also a co-author of the fantasy novel But...But...Barbarians? Collaborators of his include Gerry Alanguilan, Todd McFarlane, and the Wu-Tang Clan. Haberlin currently runs a blog on the Digital Art Tutorials website. Haberlin counts among his influences Marko Djurdjevic, Egon Schiele, Katsuhiro Otomo, and TV series such as Lost.

Haberlin is a frequent contributor to both the 3D World and ImagineFX magazines, and is part of the Adjunct Faculty of the Minneapolis College of Art and Design. His work has been added to the permanent collection of the Smithsonian Institution.

== Awards ==
- 1999: Nominated for "Favorite Colorist" Wizard Fan Award (for Aria)
- 2014: Inkpot Award

== Bibliography ==
=== Comics work ===
- Cyberforce (colors, Image Comics, 1994)
- Codename: Stryke Force (colors, Image Comics, 1994–1995)
- Shi: Senryaku (colors, Image Comics, 1995)
- Witchblade (colors, script, Image Comics, 1995–1997)
- Vampirella: Sad Wings of Destiny (colors, Harris Comics, 1996)
- Kiss: Psycho Circus (colors, Image Comics, 1996–1997)
- Tales of the Darkness (colors, script, Image Comics, 1998)
- Stone (co-written by Whilce Portacio, Avalon Studios, 1998)
- Aria (colors, script, Avalon Studios, 1999)
- The Wicked (editing, Avalon Studios, 1999)
- The Nine Rings of Wu-Tang (with co-author Aaron Bullock and pencils by Clayton Henry, Avalon Studios (Image Comics), 1999–2000)
- Area 52 (with art by Clayton Henry, 4-issue mini-series, Image Comics, 2001)
- Aria: The Soul Market (co-written with Brian Holguin, Avalon Studios, 2001)
- Athena Inc. The Manhunter Project (script, Avalon Studios, 2002)
- Aria Volume 3: The Uses of Enchantment (co-written with Brian Holguin, Lan Medina, and Jay Anacleto, Image Comics, 2004)
- Spawn Manga (written by Juzo Tokoro, translated by Francis Takenaga, Image Comics, 2005–2006)
- Spawn: Godslayer (written by Brian Holguin and co-illustrated by Jay Anacleto, Image Comics, 2007)
- Spawn (co-written with David Hine, Image Comics, 2006–2008)
- Captain Wonder 3D (co-written with Philip Tan, Image Comics, 2011)
- Anomaly (Anomaly Productions, 2012)
- Shifter (2014)
- Faster than Light, Image Comics, 2015)
- Anomaly: The Rubicon (2017)
- Sonata (2020)
- Lighthouse (2021)
- Hellcop (2022)
- The Last Barbarians (2023)

=== Non-comics work ===
- But...But...Barbarians? (with co-author James Haberlin, Image Comics, 2005)
- Neo Beauties: The Pin-Up Art of Brian Haberlin (Out of print, Image Comics, 2005)
- Follow the Leader (Korn album cover, Epic Records, 1998)
