= Ben 10: Destroy All Aliens =

2012 television film directed by Victor Cook

- Promotional poster for the film.
- Genre: Superhero
- Created by: Man of Action
- Based on: Ben 10 by Man of Action
- Written by: Marty Isenberg
- Directed by: Victor Cook
- Starring: Tara Strong; Meagan Smith; Paul Eiding
- Composers: Kristopher Carter; Michael McCuistion; Lolita Ritmanis
- Countries of origin: United States; Singapore
- Original language: English

Production
- Executive producers: Mark Eyers; Rick Fernandes; Silas Hickey; Vishnu Athreya
- Editor: Aaron Seelman
- Running time: 69 minutes
- Production companies: Tiny Island Productions; Turner Broadcasting System Asia Pacific; Monkey Punch Studio, LLC

Original release
- Network: Cartoon Network
- Release: March 11, 2012

Ben 10: Destroy All Aliens is a 2012 animated superhero television film that premiered on Cartoon Network Asia on March 11, 2012, and on Cartoon Network in the United States on March 23, 2012, as part of "Ben 10 Week" which ran from March 19 – March 24, 2012. The events of the film take place after the final episode of the series and before the events of Ben 10: Race Against Time. It was officially unveiled at San Diego Comic-Con in 2011. This is Cartoon Network Asia's first film in collaboration with Cartoon Network Studios. It is considered the official three-part finale of the 2005 animated series.

== Plot ==
Ben, Gwen, and their grandfather Max spend their evenings battling aliens on Bellwood's streets. During a battle with a robotic tank, Ben as Upgrade and Gwen argue about the best way to defeat it, resulting in Gwen casting a dismantling spell on the tank while Ben is still attached to it. Unknown to the group, this causes a malfunction in the Omnitrix.

Later, after a mishap in school where J.T. and Cash lock Ben in his locker, and the Omnitrix accidentally teleports his homework away, Ben is grounded by his parents, Carl and Sandra, and forced to stay at home to do a history report. Ben attempts to work on the report before the Omnitrix teleports his laptop away as well. Shortly afterwards, Ben's alien friend Tetrax arrives, telling him that Azmuth has asked to meet with him. They go to meet Azmuth, but are attacked by a To'kustar, who unbeknownst to them is teleported into the Omnitrix. Tetrax decides to take Ben to search for Azmuth and activates a new function on the Omnitrix. Before he can explain this new ability, the ship is attacked and Ben is sucked out into the atmosphere, falling to the ground as Diamondhead.

It is later revealed that the new ability prevents Ben from returning to human form when the Omnitrix times out, simply switching into another one of his alien forms. Ben as Four Arms arrives at Stonehenge, but is confronted and attacked by a Galvanic Mechamorph who demands to know about the To'kustar who attacked Ben. Ben explains that he knows nothing, but the Galvanic Mechamorph only continues to attack, and its teleportation ability causes the pair to carry the rest of their battle across the globe. After arriving back in Bellwood, Ben transforms into Grey Matter and manages to escape.

Meanwhile, Gwen and Max receive a call from Ben's parents informing them that Ben is missing. They go in search of him only to find Tetrax. The three discover Azmuth's ship, but with no sign of Azmuth. Looking at the ship's log, they discover that Azmuth disguised it as a truck to track down and fix the Omnitrix, but crashed and was destroyed by the To'kustar. Gwen, Max and Tetrax soon encounter Ben back at his house, and restore the Omnitrix to normal as the Mechamorph catches up to them. Gwen deduces how the Omnitrix reacts after Ben returns to his human form and realizes what has happened just as she, Ben, Tetrax and the Mechamorph are transported into the Omnitrix.

Inside, Ben and the Mechamorph continue to battle before being attacked by a swarm of Lepidopterrans and Gwen and Tetrax are ambushed by Vulpimancers. The four catch up with each other and they realize that the To'kustar is inside with them just as he resurfaces. The Mechamorph reveals himself as Azmuth's father, who attacks the To'kustar to avenge the death of his son, while Gwen explains to Ben how she caused the Omnitrix's malfunction and returns them all to Earth.

Azmuth's father pursues and fights the To'kustar, but the Omnitrix malfunctions again and transforms Ben's parents into a Vulpimancer and Pyronite, causing Gwen to realize that Azmuth had been transformed into the To'kustar they are fighting. Leaving Max and Tetrax to fight his parents, Ben and Gwen follow Azmuth and his father to the city, where Ben transforms into Way Big to battle Azmuth and hold off his father while he and Gwen try and reverse his transformation. Ben and Gwen finally convince Azmuth's father that his son is the To'kustar, and the three help Azmuth regain control of himself.

Now regaining his senses, Azmuth uses his father's Mechamorph abilities to fix the Omnitrix and subsequently allow it to return himself to normal. Azmuth reprimands Ben and Gwen for their errors and reveals that his father is actually a Galvan like him, wearing a Mechamorph-like armor that amplifies any anger of the user explaining his behavior. Hearing Azmuth explaining of how the Omnitrix was so filled with mana, Gwen wonders just what he is referring to, with Azmuth telling her that she will find out eventually. Returning to Ben's house, Azmuth restores Ben's parents to normal and repairs the Rustbucket, previously destroyed in the battle, before leaving to reconcile with his own father.

Ben's parents later tell him to enjoy his fishing trip with Max and Gwen, but Ben declines now that he has learned to be more responsible and decides to stay home to finish his history report. Subsequently, he, Gwen, and Max embark on another road trip where they encounter Doctor Animo and the three prepare for another exciting battle.

== Cast ==
- Tara Strong as Benjamin Tennyson, Upgrade, Sandra Tennyson, Computer Voice
- Meagan Smith as Gwendolyn Tennyson, Female Student
- Paul Eiding as Maxwell Tennyson
- Steven Blum as Heatblast, Mechamorph
- David Fennoy as Tetrax Shard
- Richard McGonagle as Four Arms, Ben's Fifth Grade Teacher
- Robert David Hall as Azmuth
- Dee Bradley Baker as Stinkfly, Wildmutt, Cash Murray, Carl Tennyson
- Adam Wylie as JT
- Richard Steven Horvitz as Grey Matter, Police Radio
- Jim Ward as Diamondhead
- Fred Tatasciore as Way Big, Evil Way Big
- Troy Baker as Azmuth's Father, Male Student
- Dwight Schultz as Dr. Animo

== Production ==
To promote the film, a toy line manufactured by Bandai had been announced to launch around the same time the film premiered. Cartoon Network Asia and Philippines held a contest for one male and one female to be "immortalized in Ben 10 history." The two winners would receive "the ultimate voice over role," assorted prizes (clothing, toys, etc.) and a VIP limo ride to walk on the "green carpet" at the Ben 10: Destroy All Aliens premiere. A similar competition was held in Malaysia and the Middle East. Filipino viewers heard the Philippine winners while the rest of Southeast Asia will hear the Malaysian kids. The winners of the contest in Philippines were later revealed to be Nina Teo and Xander Ching, who ended up voicing two of Ben's classmates. Cartoon Network Africa held a contest to win Green Movie Tickets to the exclusive premiere of the film in Johannesburg on March 10, 2012.

The film was later released on iTunes and other electronic-based stores, such as the PlayStation Store. A Filipino dub of the film was broadcast on TV5's Cartoon Network block on May 5, 2012.

Though originally stated to not be canon, Ben 10: Omniverse art director Derrick J. Wyatt later stated that the film is canon. According to Wyatt, the destruction caused by the battle between Way Big and the evil Way Big led to aliens being brought in to rebuild the area. The aliens established their own society of Undertown, which was later introduced in Omniverse.

=== Crew ===
- Victor Cook - Director, Supervising producer
- Silas Hickey - Executive producer
- Marty Isenberg - Writer
- Collette Sunderman - Casting and voice director
- Turner Broadcasting System Asia Pacific - Creative animation director

== Home media ==
Madman Entertainment released Destroy All Aliens in Region 4 on June 20, 2012. Warner Home Video released the film in Region 2 on October 1, 2012. The film was released in Region 1 on April 16, 2013, and also included in the Ben 10: The Complete Collection DVD box set released in May 13th, 2025.

== Reception ==
=== Critical reviews ===
Emily Ashby of Common Sense Media gave Ben 10: Destroy All Aliens a 3 out of 5. Although criticizing the story's excessive violence, Ashby states that the story emphasizes the joy of family, even when that comes with rules a person does not like.

=== Nielsen ratings ===
In the United States, Ben 10: Destroy All Aliens increased by double digits across the board versus the same time period in 2011. The broadcast placed #1 in its time period in boys 2–11.

The film was watched by 2.080 million viewers with a 0.4 adult rating.

== Accolades ==
The film won the Best 3D Animated Program category at the Asian Television Awards 2012 as well as the Gold Award for Best Movie Campaign in the 2012 ProMax Awards. The award demonstrated the high level of animation talent on show in Asia and the talent available here, commented Sunny Saha from Turner International.

== See also ==
- Ben 10
- Ben 10: Secret of the Omnitrix
- Ben 10: Race Against Time
- Ben 10: Protector of Earth
- List of Ben 10 episodes
