= Ben 10 (comic series) =

2026 American comic book series

- Ben 10 #1 cover, art by Robert Carey

Publication information
- Publisher: Dynamite Entertainment
- Schedule: Monthly
- Format: Ongoing series
- Genre: Superhero
- Publication date: May 6, 2026 – present
- Main characters: Ben Tennyson; Gwen Tennyson; Max Tennyson

Creative team
- Created by: Man of Action Entertainment
- Written by: Joe Casey; Steven T. Seagle
- Artist: Robert Carey
- Letterer: Taylor Esposito
- Colorist: Ren Spiller

Ben 10 is an American comic book ongoing series that debuted on May 6, 2026, being published by Dynamite Entertainment. The comic book is based on the media franchise of the same name by Cartoon Network and Man of Action Entertainment, and its second reboot after the 2016–2021 series, as well as the franchise's first entry in five years.

== Publication history ==
=== Background ===
Several Ben 10 comics have been previously published by Boom! Studios, DC Comics, Del Rey Books, IDW Publishing and Viz Media, respectably.

=== Development ===
In July 2024, Dynamite Entertainment announced to have extended its collaboration with Warner Bros. Discovery to publish comics based on the latter's several animated franchises, with a new Ben 10 comic series being in development. No official announcement was made until October 2024, with the return of original creators Joe Casey, Joe Kelly, Duncan Rouleau and Steven T. Seagle from Man of Action Entertainment as part of the comic's official creative team. Casey is the initial main writer of the book, with Robert Carey as the main artist.

According to Casey, the comic is intended to be a new official reboot of the franchise after the 2005 and 2016 television series, starting a new continuity. He said, "Ben 10 is obviously very close to our hearts, and has been for the last twenty years. So we're psyched to finally present a vision of Ben and his mythology in the manner and format that we've always wanted to see. This is basically a straight-up superhero comic that's going to compete with every major series out there. This is Ultimate or Absolute Ben 10. We guarantee, this is the best that Ben 10 has ever been."

In December 2025, Rouleau affirmed the book is complete, but in January 2026, he also confirmed the comic was postponed for release on May. In February 2026, it was announced that the first issue would be officially released in May 6, 2026 alongside its cover. A preview containing four pages without dialogue was also shown. The main cover was done by Robert Carey, as well as four variant covers by Duncan Rouleau, Dustin Nguyen, Sebastian Piriz, and Eric Canete.

== Characters ==
=== Heroes ===
- Ben Tennyson - A ten-year-old boy who discovers the Omnitrix while on a summer road trip with his cousin Gwen and grandfather Max. Originally from Ben 10 (2005).
- Gwen Tennyson - Ben's cousin who is into extraterrestrial conspiracies, even if he doesn't believe her. Unlike in Ben 10: Alien Force where she has a brother named Ken, Gwen is an only child in this continuity. Originally from Ben 10 (2005).
- Max Tennyson - Ben and Gwen's grandfather who takes them on a road trip during the summer and is hiding a secret of his own. Originally from Ben 10 (2005).

==== Aliens ====
- Four Arms - A red four-armed humanoid whose main ability is immense strength. He first appears in issue #1 as the first alien used by Ben. Originally from Ben 10 (2005).
- Heatblast - A fiery humanoid whose main ability is pyrokinesis. He first appears in issue #1. Originally from Ben 10 (2005).
- Cannonbolt - A pillbug-like humanoid with yellow armored plating whose main ability is rolling into a sphere. He first appears in issue #2. Originally from Ben 10 (2005).
- Diamondhead - A teal crystalline humanoid whose main ability is generating crystal projectiles and structures. He first appears in issue #3. Originally from Ben 10 (2005).
- XLR8 - A Velociraptor-like humanoid whose main ability is enhanced speed. He is first teased in issue #2 and first appears properly in issue #4. Originally from Ben 10 (2005).
- Stinkfly - A bug-like creature whose main abilities are flight and projectile goo. He is first teased in issue #2 and first appears properly in issue #4. Originally from Ben 10 (2005).
- Grey Matter - A tiny grey frog-like humanoid whose main ability is hyper intelligence. He is first teased in issue #2 and first appears properly in issue #5. Originally from Ben 10 (2005).
- Overflow - A red armored water-based humanoid whose main abilities are hydrokinesis and underwater breathing. He is first teased in issue #2 and will make his first appearance in issue #7. Originally from Ben 10 (2016).
- Wildvine - A plant-like creature whose main abilities include chlorokinesis and extended vines. He is first teased in issue #2, first appears properly in issue #4 via a dream and full first appears properly in issue #8. Originally from Ben 10 (2005).
- Upgrade - A blob-like humanoid with green electrical lines across his body whose main ability is technological possession. He is first teased in issue #2 and is yet to make a proper first appearance. Originally from Ben 10 (2005).

=== Villains ===
- Vilgax - A mysterious squid-like humanoid warlord in pursuit of the Omnitrix, believing it could challenge his ultimate destiny of conquering the universe. Originally from Ben 10 (2005).
- Colonel Rozum - A colonel who is after the Omnitrix alongside the U.S. Army. Originally from Ben 10: Ultimate Alien.
  - Sergeant Galloway - a military officer who was working under Rozum. He first appears in issue #1 before being killed by Kraab in the following issue.
- Cybernetic bear - A bear with exposed cybernetic skeletal parts who briefly encountered Ben in the forest where he found the Omnitrix. Originally made for this comic series.
- Kraab - A murderous robotic crab-like alien who was sent to capture the Omnitrix. Originally from Ben 10 (2005).
- Zombozo - A clown-themed villain who first appears in issue #4. Originally from Ben 10 (2005).
  - The Circus Trio - Zombozo's henchman consisting of Frightwig, Acid Breath, and Thumbskull who first appear in issue #4. Originally from Ben 10 (2005)
- Professor "Hex" Hexford - A Northern Arizona University professor who possesses various mythical artifacts and is obssessed with magic. He first appears in issue #6. Originally from Ben 10 (2005)

== Story arcs ==
Issue	Written by	Drawn by	Colored by	Publication date
=== Volume 1: Event Arrival ===
01	Joe Casey	Robert Carey	Ren Spiller	May 6, 2026
02	Joe Casey	Robert Carey	Ren Spiller	June 10, 2026
03	Joe Casey	Robert Carey	Ren Spiller	July 8, 2026
04	Steven T. Seagle	Robert Carey	Ren Spiller	August 5, 2026
05	Steven T. Seagle	Robert Carey	Ren Spiller	September 2, 2026
06	Joe Casey	Robert Carey	Ren Spiller	November 11, 2026
