= Power Players =

CGI animated series

- Genre: Action; Adventure; Science fiction; Superhero; Comedy
- Created by: Jeremy Zag
- Developed by: Man of Action
- Directed by: Tarik Hamdine; Yoan Parent
- Voices of: Kieran Walton; Greg Chun; Aleks Le; Todd Haberkorn; Reba Buhr; Carlos Salazar; Jamieson Price
- Theme music composer: Jeremy Zag; Cash Callaway
- Composers: Jeremy Zag; Noam Kaniel
- Countries of origin: United States; France
- Original languages: English
- No. of seasons: 1
- No. of episodes: 78

Production
- Executive producer: Cédric Pilot; Carine Karsenti; Kevin Marciano; Joe Casey; Joe Kelly; Duncan Rouleau; Steven T. Seagle; Olivier Glaas
- Producers: Jeremy Zag; Aton Soumache; Brice Garnier
- Running time: 11 minutes
- Production companies: Zagtoon; Method Animation; Man of Action Studios; Kaibou; ON Kids & Family

Original release
- Network: Cartoon Network (US); France 4 (France)
- Release: September 21, 2019 – April 15, 2021

Power Players is an independent CGI-animated television series created by Jeremy Zag and developed by Man of Action. The series is produced by Zagtoon and Method Animation, in co-production with ON Kids & Family, Man of Action Studios and Kaibou, with the participation of Cartoon Network, Globosat, Planeta Group, WDR, WDR Mediagroup and Discovery Latin America.

The series premiered in the United States on September 21, 2019, on Cartoon Network. In March 2020, Power Players started airing reruns on Boomerang and Netflix.

== Premise ==
9-year-old boy Axel Mulligan fights evil living toy Madcap and his minions with the help of the titular heroic toy team, the Power Players. Axel is also able to become a toy himself using the Power Bandz, a device created by his uncle Andrew.

== Characters ==
=== Main ===
- Axel (voiced by Kieran Walton) – Andrew's nephew, who gains the ability to transform into an action figure after discovering the Power Bandz.
- Masko (voiced by Carlos Salazar) – A luchador action figure whose arms, legs and head stretch and who wears various masks based on his emotions.
- Sarge Charge (voiced by Greg Chun) – A tough, grizzled soldier action figure who is an expert in toy weapons.
- Bearbarian (voiced by Jamieson Price) – A blue teddy bear who wields a sledgehammer nicknamed the "Worldbreaker".
- Bobbie Blobby (voiced by Reba Buhr) – A small doll who pilots a purple mech suit that can fire clay.
- Galileo (voiced by Todd Haberkorn) – A blue reptilian action figure who is able to turn invisible.
- Slobot (voiced by Landon McDonald) – A robot action figure who moves slowly, but is a valuable asset of the team.
- Zoe (voiced by Carolina Ravassa) – Axel's friend, who is the only human who knows Axel's secret.

=== Recurring ===
- Andrew (voiced by Scott Whyte) – Axel's uncle, a brilliant engineer who created both Madcap and the Power Players.
- Luka (voiced by Aleks Le) – A friend of Axel.
- Cleo LeBall (voiced by Carolina Ravassa) – Zoe's archenemy
- Joyride (Ronin in French) (voiced by Zach Aguilar) – A modified action figure with mattracks who was brought to life by Madcap, but later betrayed him and became an ally to the Power Players.

=== Villains ===
- Madcap (voiced by Paul Haapaniemi) – A villainous robot action figure who wants to drain the power of Axel's Power Bandz to conquer the world. He has the power to absorb and control Minergy and can use it to bring toys to life.
- Orangutank and Porcupunk (voiced by Steven T. Seagle and Scott Whyte respectively) – Two of Madcap's henchmen. Orangutank is a orangutan action figure can fire energy disks from his back and arms, while Porcupunk is a porcupine action figure can launch explosive missiles from his body.
- Princess Sugar Salt (voiced by Sona Movsesian) – A fairy doll who wields a magical wand.
- Dynamo (voiced by Todd Haberkorn) – A armored cyclops action figure who has electromagnetic powers.
- Ice Crusher (voiced by Steven T. Seagle) – A Canadian-accented hockey player action figure.
- Dr. Nautilus (voiced by Richard Steven Horvitz) – A cyclops-like mollusk action figure with four stretchable arms who resides in the sewers. He is able to generate both acid and sentient eyeball creatures.
- Pyrant (voiced by Neil Kaplan) – A pyramid toy who can answer any question and has mind-control powers.

== Development and production ==
The show was originally greenlit in 2016 under the working title Power Toys before being renamed Power Players.

On February 11, 2019, the series was officially picked up by Cartoon Network, making it the first Zagtoon production to be made and produced for this channel, and Playmates became the toy licenser. Power Players premiered on Cartoon Network UK on February 3, 2020.

== Episodes ==
No. overall	No. in season	Title	Directed by	Written by	Original release date	Prod. code	U.S. viewers (millions)
Cartoon Network
1	1	"Unboxing"	Tarik Hamdine	Michaël Delachenal; Story by : Man of Action; Jeremy Zag	September 21, 2019	101	0.32
2	2	"Unboxing"	Tarik Hamdine	Michaël Delachenal; Story by : Man of Action; Jeremy Zag	September 21, 2019	101	0.32
Axel ventures into his uncle's strictly off-limits basement lab in hopes of fixing a broken toy and ends up unleashing living ones instead: the renegade Madcap and a team of superpowered toys dedicated to stopping him.
3	3	"Attack of the Thermometron 9000"	Tarik Hamdine	Simon Lecocq; Story by : A.J. Marchisello	September 28, 2019	102A	0.31
Slobot invents a super thermostat to appease an argument between Bobby Blobby and Galileo, but it soon goes haywire.
4	4	"The Dynamo Dynamic"	Tarik Hamdine	Michaël Delachenal; Story by : Marcus Rinehart	September 28, 2019	102B	0.31
Axel finds himself at the center of a disagreement between Sarge and Masko over what is more important in battle - the weapon or the one who wields it - after Dynamo bonds the trio together using magnetism.
5	5	"Access Denied"	Tarik Hamdine	Simon Lecocq; Story by : Man of Action	October 5, 2019	103A	0.27
When Axel and the team try to figure out what Sarge Charge's secret weapon is, they get ejected from the house by his newly upgraded security system and must fight their way back inside before Madcap does.
6	6	"Swing Set Jet Set"	Tarik Hamdine	Michaël Delachenal; Story by : A.J. Marchisello	October 5, 2019	103B	0.27
Axel and the team battle Princess Sugar Salt for possession of Bearbarian's hammer, which was traded to her by Galileo.
7	7	"Side Kicked"	Tarik Hamdine	Michaël Delachenal; Story by : Marcus Rinehart	October 12, 2019	104A	0.32
Axel's friend Zoe builds her own battle suit in hopes of joining Axel's team, and tries to assist them in a battle against Pyrant and his army of mind-control drones.
8	8	"Porcupunk Rock"	Tarik Hamdine	Michaël Delachenal; Story by : Ricky Mammone	October 12, 2019	104B	0.32
Madcap turns to Axel and his team for help after an upgrade to Porcupunk threatens to destroy his lair.
9	9	"All Trick No Treat"	Tarik Hamdine; Yoan Parent	Julien Magnat; Story by : A.J. Marchisello	October 19, 2019	105A	0.34
On Halloween, Axel gets too caught up in the scares and loses track of the fun, just in time for an infiltration by Madcap.
10	10	"Iced Out"	Tarik Hamdine	Julia Edelman; Story by : Sean Geraghty	October 19, 2019	105B	0.34
Madcap’s latest creation, the Ice Crusher, puts the whole city in a deep freeze, forcing Axel and the team to face him in a game of high-stakes hockey or risk entering another ice age.
11	11	"Gathering Dark"	Tarik Hamdine	Jean-Philippe Robin; Story by : Colin McLaughlin	October 26, 2019	106A	0.36
Axel must help Bearbarian overcome his fear of the dark to defeat Dynamo.
12	12	"Bobbie Not Blobby"	Tarik Hamdine	Michaël Delachenal; Story by : Michaël Delachenal; Josephine Green Zhang	October 26, 2019	106B	0.36
Bobbie Blobby's mech-suit is stolen by Dr. Nautilus, who is intent on using it to flood the sewers.
13	13	"Sand Trap"	Tarik Hamdine	Julien Magnat; Story by : Man of Action	January 19, 2020	107A	0.26
Axel and the team take to the desert dunes of a playground sandbox as Madcap attempts to unearth an army of Spy Lizards from the same toy line as Galileo.
14	14	"Dodge City"	Tarik Hamdine	Simon Lecocq; Story by : Duncan Rouleau	January 19, 2020	107B	0.26
Axel must embrace the spirit of dodgeball to stop Madcap and Princess Sugar Salt's battle over who is the better villain from spilling over into Zoe and Cleo's argument over who is the better coach.
15	15	"The Best Team"	Tarik Hamdine; Yoan Parent	Simon Lecocq	January 26, 2020	108A	0.35
When Madcap and his minions crash a soapbox derby, the team must stop the baddies and help Axel - who is stuck in a car with Luka - cross the finish line.
16	16	"Joyride"	Tarik Hamdine	Simon Lecocq	January 26, 2020	108B	0.35
At a rummage sale with Uncle Andrew, Axel and Zoe must stop Madcap from turning her long-lost tank toy, Joyride, into an agent of mayhem.
17	17	"Savage Axel"	Tarik Hamdine	Michaël Delachenal; Story by : A.J. Marchisello	February 2, 2020	109A	0.28
Bearbarian helps Axel get in touch with his wild side as they try to prevent Orangutank from "liberating" nature from an apartment building.
18	18	"The Scratch Pack"	Tarik Hamdine	Julia Edelman; Story by : Meghan Pleticha	February 2, 2020	109B	0.28
Axel and the team must run damage control after a loose spark of Minergy accidentally brings Zoe's old cat toys to life.
19	19	"Knockout"	Tarik Hamdine	Man of Action	February 9, 2020	110A	0.23
Axel and Masko are trying to protect the Knockout Box, Andrew's latest invention, from Orangutank, the latter thinking it will make him stronger, while trying to get some goulash for Masko and keeping Andrew asleep.
20	20	"Sarge in Charge"	Tarik Hamdine	Michaël Delachenal; Story by : Sean Aitchison	February 9, 2020	110B	0.23
Axel and the team must rescue Sarge Charge from a solo mission in the backyard, which Orangutank has turned into his own personal heart of darkness.
21	21	"The Other Side"	Tarik Hamdine	Julien Magnat; Story by : Marcus Rinehart	February 23, 2020	111A	0.25
Axel must 'save' Bobbie Blobby after she defects to Madcap's team, tempted by Porcupunk and his assertion that she belongs with the bad toys.
22	22	"Bare-Knuckle Brawl"	Tarik Hamdine	Simon Lecocq; Story by : Dane Arlyn Styler	February 23, 2020	111B	0.25
Axel and Bearbarian must team up to stop Madcap from transforming Luka's stuffed bear collection into an invincible army.
23	23	"Saving Private Masko"	Tarik Hamdine	Julia Edelman; Story by : Joe Barnathan	March 1, 2020	112A	0.23
Masko takes Axel's call for more discipline too seriously and loses sight of his own identity in the process, becoming a no-nonsense soldier who is set on toeing the line and ill-equipped for a lucha libre with Madcap.
24	24	"On Your Toes"	Tarik Hamdine	Michaël Delachenal; Story by : Marcus Rinehart	March 1, 2020	112B	0.23
After a Porcupunk sighting, Axel leads a recon mission that slowly but surely proves to be a wild goose chase devised by Sarge, who is secretly pursuing a hobby that he is afraid to share with his teammates.
25	25	"Friends War"	Tarik Hamdine	Julia Edelman; Story by : Kevin Somers	March 15, 2020	113A	0.28
Princess Sugar Salt dupes Axel into hanging out with Cleo LeBall and usurps his role as team leader, forcing Zoe to step in and keep the toys together.
26	26	"The Slobot is No Bot of Mine"	Tarik Hamdine	Simon Lecocq; Story by : Shoshana Sachi	March 15, 2020	113B	0.28
Axel and the team compete against themselves in tests of skill, strength, and stamina, but when SloBot gets belittled, he splits into three separate robots - each with their own evil personalities.
27	27	"Bowling for Ballers"	Tarik Hamdine	Michaël Delachenal; Man of Action	March 22, 2020	114A	0.25
Axel and the team must intervene when Madcap, Porcupunk, and Dynamo interrupt Zoe's bowling competition with Cleo LeBall.
28	28	"Countdown"	Tarik Hamdine	Michaël Delachenal; Story by : Sean Aitchison	March 22, 2020	114B	0.25
Axel has to clean up the living room in time for his uncle's dinner party, but trying to do too much at once leaves him stuck as a toy with Orangutank on the loose and less than an hour until the guests arrive.
29	29	"Joke's on You, Bro"	Tarik Hamdine	Julien Magnat	March 29, 2020	115A	0.31
Axel and the team turn Galileo's camouflaging pranks on him and convince him that he is permanently invisible, with disastrous results.
30	30	"Out of My Head"	Tarik Hamdine	Simon Lecocq; Story by : Ryan Little	March 29, 2020	115B	0.31
Axel must help Sarge and Bobbie learn to walk in each other's shoes - literally - after Luka unwittingly switches their heads.
31	31	"Freeze!"	Tarik Hamdine; Yoan Parent	Simon Lecocq; Story by : Jeff Treppel	April 5, 2020	116A	0.23
Axel and his team find themselves in a tough position after Ice Crusher makes it too cold for them to fight back at full speed.
32	32	"King Axel"	Tarik Hamdine	Michaël Delachenal; Story by : Michaël Delachenal; Man of Action	April 5, 2020	116B	0.23
After a screening of the King Arthur tale, Axel holds out his sword and declares himself king, but when Dynamo uses his magnetism to steal the weapon and bestow it upon Masko, it casts doubt among the team over who is the true leader.
33	33	"The Trojan Bear"	Tarik Hamdine	Julia Edelman; Story by : Sean Geraghty	April 12, 2020	117A	0.24
When Axel opens a subscription gift-box he didn't even order, the team finds their ranks divided by a robotic bear who turns out to be a disguised Princess Sugar Salt.
34	34	"Thirst for Power"	Tarik Hamdine; Yoan Parent	Michaël Delachenal; Story by : Tanner Marchisello	April 12, 2020	117B	0.24
Axel and his toys deploy the Joyride in a battle against Dr. Nautilus, who has punctured a water main to flood the sewers and establish himself as "Admiral Nautilus".
35	35	"Party On"	Tarik Hamdine	Julia Edelman	April 19, 2020	118A	0.18
As Zoe preps Cleo LeBall's birthday party, Axel and the team run damage control against a jealous Princess Sugar Salt, who turns the decorations and gifts into instruments of chaos.
36	36	"Bringing Up Baby"	Tarik Hamdine	Julien Magnat	April 19, 2020	118B	0.18
Zoe leaves Axel in charge of her school project of watching over an infant simulator doll, but when Madcap brings the doll to life, Axel and the team must stop the baby without damaging it or risk getting a failing grade.
37	37	"Stretched Too Thin"	Tarik Hamdine	Simon Lecocq; Story by : Jason Adam Katzenstein	April 26, 2020	119A	0.20
After a new combo-move leaves Masko permanently limp, Axel and the team must help him get his stretch back.
38	38	"From Below"	Tarik Hamdine	Michaël Delachenal; Story by : Janis Robertson	April 26, 2020	119B	0.20
Axel juggles looking after Luka and defending the house from Dr. Nautilus's latest creation, a tentacled monster that attacks from every drain, pipe, and faucet in the building.
39	39	"Winner Takes All"	Tarik Hamdine	Michaël Delachenal; Story by : A.J. Marchisello	May 3, 2020	120A	0.18
After months of training for Luchador Day, Axel needs Masko to coach him against a pair of uninvited competitors - Madcap and Dynamo!
40	40	"Prepare for the Worst"	Tarik Hamdine	Jean-Philippe Robin; Story by : Shoshana Sashi	May 3, 2020	120B	0.18
Axel and Bobbie Blobby skip out on Sarge's disaster-prep drills, thus leaving enough of a gap in the team's defenses for a crow to swoop in and snatch Sarge! Feeling responsible, Axel leads the team on a search-and-rescue mission.
41	41	"Stuck on You"	Tarik Hamdine; Yoan Parent	Jean-Philippe Robin; Story by : Marcus Rinehart	May 17, 2020	121A	0.19
Tired of Axel and the team taking him for granted, Masko tries to get kidnapped and ends up stuck to Dynamo, who is less than enthused with his rubbery new sidekick.
42	42	"Opposites Attract"	Tarik Hamdine	Michaël Delachenal; Story by : Tanner Marchisello	May 17, 2020	121B	0.19
Claiming to be good at heart, Dynamo convinces Axel and the team to help him find a battery that can power his centrifuge and free him from Madtrap's control - but Bobbie Blobby isn't buying the baddie's story.
43	43	"The Thing in the Wall"	Tarik Hamdine; Yoan Parent	Julia Edelman; Story by : Dennis Culver	May 24, 2020	122A	0.21
When Axel and the team accuse Galileo of stealing their possessions, the lizard must hunt down the true culprit - a mysterious creature behind the wall - to prove his innocence.
44	44	"Madtrap"	Tarik Hamdine; Yoan Parent	Julien Magnat; Story by : Dane Styler	May 24, 2020	122B	0.21
Madcap and Princess Sugar Salt trap Axel and the team inside a Minergy-powered labyrinth that attacks them with their greatest fears, forcing them to work together and escape as a unit.
45	45	"To Tame the Perilous Skies!"	Tarik Hamdine	Michaël Delachenal; Story by : Emiliano Bolado	May 31, 2020	123A	0.17
With Axel’s drone-wing broken, the team must find another way to stop Madcap and his minions as they take to the skies in toy airplanes for an aerial assault on the city park.
46	46	"Four Color Fallout"	Tarik Hamdine; Yoan Parent	Michaël Delachenal; Story by : Marcus Rinehart	May 31, 2020	123B	0.17
Madcap uses Minergy to transport Axel, Galileo, and Sarge into the pages of Axel's favorite comic book, the hero of which turns out not to be so cool after all.
47	47	"Grin and Bear It"	Tarik Hamdine; Yoan Parent	Simon Lecocq; Story by : Michael Pyndus	June 7, 2020	124A	0.16
When a toothache sends Axel to the dentist, the team must fight off Princess Sugar Salt, who confuses Axel's new "crown" for the real thing.
48	48	"Green with Envy"	Tarik Hamdine; Yoan Parent	Julia Edelman; Story by : Paul Haapaniemi	June 7, 2020	124B	0.16
When the local news interviews Uncle Andrew about his toy inventing, an envious Galileo stages a play in the park with the help of Axel and the team, only to be interrupted by an equally envious Madcap, who is out to steal the spotlight for himself.
49	49	"Bring on the Bad Guys"	Tarik Hamdine; Yoan Parent	Simon Lecocq; Story by : Sean Aitchison	June 14, 2020	125A	0.22
Axel, Zoe, and the team confront Madcap and his minions as they terrorize a local supermarket.
50	50	"Spies Like Us"	Tarik Hamdine	Julien Magnat; Story by : Dan Marmor	June 14, 2020	125B	0.22
Uncle Andrew warns Axel that his vintage "Agent Danger" action figure is off-limits, only to have the toy escape on its own! Axel and the team must return Danger to its rightful place before Uncle Andrew finds out.
51	51	"Return of Thermometron 9000"	Tarik Hamdine; Yoan Parent	Julia Edelman; Story by : Ricky Mammone	June 14, 2020	126A	0.18
During a brutal heatwave, Axel and his team must track down Thermometron 9000, which has been stolen by Ice Crusher to keep his hockey rink from melting and bait them into a rematch with him.
52	52	"Just like Robots"	Tarik Hamdine; Yoan Parent	Jean-Philippe Robin	June 14, 2020	126B	0.18
Axel and the team find themselves bested by Madcap when he uses digital devices to track their every move in combat, forcing them to act unpredictably to defeat him.
Netflix
53	53	"Drummed Out"	Tarik Hamdine; Yoan Parent	Michaël Delachenal; Story by : Dillon Gemmil	April 15, 2021	127A	N/A
Sarge Charge and Galileo compete in a series of music-based challenges, which Porcupunk spies on and eventually attacks.
54	54	"Go Big or Go Home"	Tarik Hamdine; Yoan Parent	Michaël Delachenal; Story by : Marcus Rinehart	April 15, 2021	127B	N/A
The Power Players have been bored due to a lack of evil toy attacks, so they go on a recon mission. However, they are attacked by Pyrant, who puts them and Madcap's army under his control.
55	55	"Weekend at Axel's"	Tarik Hamdine; Yoan Parent	Julia Edelman; Story by : Marcus Rinehart	April 15, 2021	128A	N/A
Madcap creates the Inversion Blaster, a gun which can completely drain a toy of Minergy. He uses it on Galileo, leading Axel to attempt to trade the Power Bands for his safety.
56	56	"Things That Go Bump in the Night"	Tarik Hamdine; Yoan Parent	Michaël Delachenal; Story by : A.J. Marchisello	April 15, 2021	128B	N/A
Axel, Luka, and Zoe are having a sleepover when Madcap and his army attack, having built an evil replica of the Power Bands. They must defeat him without waking Luka up and letting him discover the toy's existence.
57	57	"Fetch"	Tarik Hamdine; Yoan Parent	Julien Magnat; Story by : Tanner Marchisello	April 15, 2021	TBA	N/A
Andrew will not allow Axel to have a dog because he does not believe him to be responsible enough. In response, Slobot takes on a dog-like form to help infiltrate Madcap's lair.
58	58	"What's Wrong with Uncle Andrew?"	Tarik Hamdine; Yoan Parent	Julien Magnat; Story by : A.J. Marchisello	April 15, 2021	TBA	N/A
Ruffin, a toy thief, gives Andrew virtual reality goggles that make him dangerously oblivious to the world around him in an effort to steal his toys. While Axel tries to keep Andrew safe, his team must stop Ruffin from stealing a Minergy battery.
59	59	"Scratch my Back"	Tarik Hamdine; Yoan Parent	Simon Lecocq; Story by : Chara Campanella	April 15, 2021	TBA	N/A
Bearbarian tears his back and revives the Scratch Pack to help ease his pain. However, they prove to be irresponsive, aggressive, and unwilling to do so.
60	60	"A Fistful of Minergy"	Tarik Hamdine; Yoan Parent	Julia Edelman; Story by : Marcus Rinehart	April 15, 2021	TBA	N/A
Madcap hires Joyride to help steal the Power Bands, causing him to undergo a crisis of morality.
61	61	"Serge Cherge"	Tarik Hamdine; Yoan Parent	Michaël Delachenal; Story by : Marcus Rinehart	April 15, 2021	TBA	N/A
The Power Players encounter Serge Cherge, a duplicate of Sarge Charge who was previously awakened alongside the rest of the Power Players, but forgotten about and subsequently trapped inside the toybox before escaping.
62	62	"The All-New-All-Different Power Players!?"	Tarik Hamdine; Yoan Parent	Julia Edelman; Story by : A.J. Marchisello	April 15, 2021	TBA	N/A
Ruffin captures the Power Players, so Axel assembles a new team to rescue them, consisting of Zoe, Bot-Guy, the Scratch Pack, and Joyride.
63	63	"Operation: Midnight"	Tarik Hamdine; Yoan Parent	Julien Magnat; Story by : Kyle Burnett	April 15, 2021	TBA	N/A
Ruffin steals Luka's teddy bears, so the Power Players undergo a night operation to retrieve them.
64	64	"That's the Spirit!"	Tarik Hamdine; Yoan Parent	Julia Edelman; Story by : Marcus Rinehart	April 15, 2021	TBA	N/A
The Power Players go on a secret mission to Andrew's workshop to get new toys, where a holographic version of Madcap attacks.
65	65	"Pyrant Park"	Tarik Hamdine; Yoan Parent	Julia Edelman; Story by : Patrick Villetto	April 15, 2021	TBA	N/A
Axel, Zoe, and Luka are playing at the park when Pyrant attacks, now controlling humans rather than toys.
66	66	"Ajar"	Tarik Hamdine; Yoan Parent	Michaël Delachenal; Story by : A.J. Marchisello	April 15, 2021	TBA	N/A
Masko is injured and loses his elasticity, so the Power Players go to Andrew's workshop to fix him.
67	67	"Jungle Boogie"	Tarik Hamdine; Yoan Parent	Michaël Delachenal; Story by : Greg Hart	April 15, 2021	TBA	N/A
Dr. Nautilus uses special gas to take control of Orangutank and Bearbarian and have them work for him.
68	68	"Take Cherge"	Tarik Hamdine; Yoan Parent	Julien Magnat; Story by : Marcus Rinehart	April 15, 2021	TBA	N/A
Serge Cherge takes control of Madcap's army after he disappears.
69	69	"Bot Out"	Tarik Hamdine; Yoan Parent	Julia Edelman; Story by : Tanner Marchisello	April 15, 2021	TBA	N/A
Madcap brings a group of robots from a video game to life to have them wreak havoc on the city.
70	70	"The Most Fun Ever"	Tarik Hamdine; Yoan Parent	Julia Edelman; Story by : A.J. Marchisello	April 15, 2021	TBA	N/A
Axel and Madcap both seek to obtain Luka's special collector robot.
71	71	"Hot Pursuit"	Tarik Hamdine; Yoan Parent	Simon Lecocq; Story by : Marcus Rinehart	April 15, 2021	TBA	N/A
Porcupunk and Orangutank steal Axel's phone, and he must recover it before his secret identity is exposed.
72	72	"On the Wrong Track"	Tarik Hamdine; Yoan Parent	Michaël Delachenal; Story by : Marcus Rinehart	April 15, 2021	TBA	N/A
An unknown thief steals Sarge Charge's binoculars, so the Power Players go to retrieve them and uncover the culprit.
73	73	"Maxel & Adcap"	Tarik Hamdine; Yoan Parent	Julien Magnat	April 15, 2021	TBA	N/A
Axel and Madcap inadvertently swap bodies after the latter interrupts the former's transformations. While Madcap wreaks havoc in Axel's room, Axel must make his way back to his house while battling Madcap's army.
74	74	"Remote-Controlled Chaos"	Tarik Hamdine; Yoan Parent	Yann Ropars; Story by : A.J. Marchisello	April 15, 2021	TBA	N/A
Joyride attempts to join the Power Players, but they ignore him due to being occupied with a remote-controller car. Madcap notices this and brings the car to life to fight them.
75	75	"Selfie!"	Tarik Hamdine; Yoan Parent	Michaël Delachenal; Story by : Steve T. Seagle	April 15, 2021	TBA	N/A
Galileo becomes overly occupied with his social media blog, which puts him in danger, and Axel must keep him safe. As the two return to the park sandbox where Madcap once built a massive sand castle, he brings the giant lizard to life again to attack them.
76	76	"The Toy Knight Returns!"	Tarik Hamdine; Yoan Parent	Michaël Delachenal; Story by : Joe Casey; Steve T. Seagle	April 15, 2021	TBA	N/A
Axel becomes dissatisfied with his dull, nice persona, and takes on a darker, black-suited one to impress his friends.
77	77	"Big Mad (Part 1)"	Tarik Hamdine; Yoan Parent	Michaël Delachenal; Story by : Steve T. Seagle; Joe Kelly; Yoan Parent; Michaël Delachenal	April 15, 2021	TBA	N/A
Madcap builds a giant suit of armor in a last-ditch effort to obtain the Power Bands, and drains the Minergy of his entire army to power it. Dr. Nautilus witnesses this and warns the Power Players of Madcap's plan, as Axel contemplates getting Andrew's help and revealing his secret.
78	78	"Big Mad (Part 2)"	Tarik Hamdine; Yoan Parent	Michaël Delachenal; Yoan Parent; Story by : Steve T. Seagle; Joe Kelly; Yoan Parent; Michaël Delachenal	April 15, 2021	TBA	N/A
Joyride fights Madcap to give the Power Players time to escape and formulate a plan. Slobot lends Axel his giant armor, but he is defeated, and Madcap drains Joyride of his Minergy. Andrew reveals that he knew of Axel's secrets all along and helps him create a trap that drains Madcap of his Minergy, killing him. Axel and Zoe recover Joyride with the intention of reviving him.

== Home media ==
In 2021, Shout! Studios signed a deal with ZAG Heroez to secure the North American DVD rights to Power Players. Other media companies that will produce home media include Koch Media in Italy, LEONINE in Germany, and Dazzler Media in the United Kingdom.
