= Zak Storm =

- Also known as: Zak Storm: Super Pirate
- Genre: Action; Adventure; Science fantasy
- Created by: Zag Heroez; Man of Action
- Developed by: Jeremy Zag; Man of Action
- Directed by: Philippe Guyenne
- Voices of: English: Michael Johnston; Christine Marie Cabanos; Chris Smith; Max Mittelman; Reba Buhr; Kyle Hebert; Keith Silverstein; Matthew Mercer; Jessica Gee-George; French: Hervé Grull; Marie Nonnenmacher; Marc Duquenoy; Olivier Podesta; Elodie Menant; Jérôme Wiggins; Benjamin Van Meggelen; Julien Chatelet
- Composers: Jeremy Zag; Noam Kaniel
- Countries of origin: France; South Korea; United States; Indonesia; Italy
- Original languages: French; English
- No. of seasons: 1
- No. of episodes: 39

Production
- Executive producers: For Method Animation: Pascal Boutboul; Kevin Marciano; Sébastien Thibaudeau; Jared Wolfson; Jean-Yves Patay; Cédric Pilot; For SAMG Animation: Suhoon Kim; For MNC Animation: Seung-Hyun Oh; For Man of Action Studios: Joe Casey; Joe Kelly; Duncan Rouleau; Steven T. Seagle; For SK Broadband: Stella Noh
- Producers: Jeremy Zag; Aton Soumache
- Running time: 22 minutes
- Production companies: Method Animation; SAMG Animation; MNC Animation; SK Broadband; De Agostini Editore; Zagtoon; ON Kids & Family; Man of Action Studios

Original release
- Network: Gulli; Canal J
- Release: 2 December 2016 – 15 December 2018

Zak Storm (also known as Zak Storm: Super Pirate) is an independent animated television series produced by Zagtoon, Method Animation, De Agostini Editore, SAMG Animation, MNC Animation, Man of Action, SK Broadband, and ON Kids & Family. It debuted on Canal J in France on 2 December 2016. It debuted in the United States on KidsClick from 30 September 2017 to 7 January 2018, followed by Discovery Family on 14 October 2017. A second season was announced to be in the works in 2019, but as of 2026 no news has been heard about it since then.

== Premise ==
When teenager Zak Storm takes his father's necklace and goes surfing, he is suddenly sucked in by a giant wave and ends up in the Bermuda Triangle where he is picked up by a sentient pirate ship called the Chaos with a talking sword named Calabrass. He discovers that the necklace contains a gem called the Eye of Beru, which gives him special powers, and that in order to return home, he needs to become the captain of the Chaos and unite the Seven Seas. He assembles a band of misfits: a ghost boy, an Atlantean princess, a Viking, and a space alien.

== Characters ==
=== Main ===
- Conrad Zacharie "Zak" Storm is a 13-year-old boy who ends up getting sucked into the Seven Seas of the Bermuda Triangle whilst out surfing. Zak is voiced by Michael Johnston in the English dub, and by Hervé Grull in the French dub.
- Chrysta Coraline "Cece" Lejune ia an Atlantean princess and Zak Storm's first mate, helping him stay grounded and keeping his brash side in check. Cece is voiced by Christine Marie Cabanos in English, and by Marie Nonnenmacher in French.
- Crogar, a 15-year-old viking pirate and the muscle of the 7Cs, often shouting "Ragnarok!" as a battle-cry. Crogar is voiced by Chris Smith in English, and by Marc Duquenoy in French.
- Caramba, a small green alien in a yellow robotic exoskeleton who serves as the 7Cs' engineer. He is voiced by Max Mittelman in English, and by Olivier Podesta in French.
- Clovis, a 7-year-old Ectoplasmic-spectre-of-awesome (as he calls himself), not a ghost. Clovis is bound to the ship Chaos and supposedly lost his body, leaving him in his ethereal state. Clovis is voiced by Reba Buhr in English, and by Elodie Menant in French.
- Calabrass is Zak's magical talking sword that grants Zak his powers, and also serves as his mentor. Calabrass holds the Seven Eyes of the Seven Seas of the Bermuda Triangle, and these Eyes each grant his wielder, Zak, a different elemental power and turn Calabrass into a new weapon. However, for each transformation, he expends energy and needs time to recover. Calabrass is voiced by Kyle Hebert in English, and by Jérôme Wiggins in French.
- The Chaos, a living high-tech pirate ship, doesn't speak but counts as a member of the crew and is surprisingly full of personality. Very loyal to his crew, but can be moody at times. Saves Zak from nearly being eaten by the kraken, when he first comes into the triangle, and never lets his Captain down, even when Zak pushes him too far.

=== Recurring ===
- Skullivar, The ruler of his own skeleton army, who wants to take over the triangle, is Zak's archenemy and tries to steal the Seven Eyes of the Seven Seas for himself and capture Zak. Skullivar is voiced by David Roach in English.
- Golden Bones is Skullivar's lieutenant. He is the captain of a ship called Demoniac and has a literal skeleton crew. He loathes Zak because he's "just a kid" who always beats him in battle. He would give anything to see Zak gone for good. Golden Bones is voiced by Matthew Mercer.
- Zephyra, daughter of Sassafras. She is half human and half Zitean. She has a moon-shaped magical necklace. She only appears in the episode "Between Stars". She also helped 7Cs. While Caramba and Crogar have a crush on her
- Sassafras, a witch that helps out Zak and the 7Cs. She is voiced by Jessica Gee-George in English.
- Alan Gamble, A pirate who is considered a "hero", but he doesn't always act like it.
- Anubis The guardian of Dezer's Waypoint. He takes his role seriously as a guardian because to him, trapped in the Triangle is like death; once you crossed over, you can never go back. He can control sand, giant scorpions and mummy minions. He has golden mechanics on his back that resembles a scorpion's tail and pincers. Voiced by David Roach.
- Lemurians are underwater dwellers who wage wars on the Atlanteans. They wear living obsidian armor.
  - Admiral T'Halis, a Lemurian general and a powerful warrior among the Lemurian Guards. He's a sadistic warmonger who has great hatred to all Atlanteans, even in the Triangle, and seeks to conquer Atlantis and all the seas on Earth. He has a hatred for humans, or Terrans, as well. Voiced by Richard Epcar.
  - Lemurian Commander, his appearance is similar to the guards but his armor is colored red.
  - Lemurian Guard, their armor resembles a lot like Spartan armor.

== Broadcast ==
Zak Storm was originally meant to air on Gulli in France. The series is also planned to air on RCTI and GTV in Indonesia, on Super RTL in Germany, DeA Kids and Super! in Italy, Clan and Canal Panda in Spain, OUFtivi in Wallonia, Kadet in Flanders, Radio Télévision Suisse in French Switzerland, Telekids in the Netherlands, SIC in Portugal, Pop and Pop Max in the United Kingdom, Discovery Family, KidsClick and Netflix in the United States, Discovery Kids in Latin America, WNYO and Family Channel/CHRGD in Canada, Yoopa in French Canada, PLUSPLUS in Ukraine, TVNZ Kidzone in New Zealand, Okto in Singapore, Spacetoon in the Middle East, on eToonz in South Africa and on Kids Zone in Pakistan.

== Episode list ==
The 39 episodes are organized by the French production numbering as posted by Télé Star. Airdates in the United States are for Discovery Family (DFC) and release dates from Netflix. As the show was syndicated for broadcast in multiple countries, others may air prior to these dates.

No. overall	No. in season	English title French title	Written by	Original air date (France)	Air and release date (U.S.)	Prod. code
1	1	"Origins Part 1" "Origines Part 1"	Man of Action, Sébastien Thibaudeau	2 December 2016	14 October 2017 (DFC); 1 November 2017 (Netflix)	101
13-year-old Zak Storm steals his father's necklace and goes surfing. He thinks the necklace is just a good luck charm when it actually holds the jewel known as the mythic eye of the Sea of Beru. A huge storm wages and sucks Zak into the Bermuda Triangle. He meets a ghost boy named Clovis, who tells him that the only way for him to get home, would be to open the seven waypoints of the Triangle, unite the Seven Seas and command them. While he's being attacked by Golden Bones, Skullivar's general, and his skeleton army, he activates the great key of the Triangle: Calabrass, the talking sword of legend. He finally escapes from Bones, and becomes quite good friends with Clovis, and learns some helpful tips and advice from Calabrass in the process.
2	2	"Origins Part 2" "Origines Part 2"	Man of Action, Sébastien Thibaudeau	3 December 2016	14 October 2017 (DFC); 1 November 2017 (Netflix)	102
Zak Storm is being attacked by a Kraken, when the clutch on the Chaos breaks down. He goes to Marituga for the first time, and meets Caramba, a small green alien from Wahoolia. But an Atlantean princess sees that Zak carries Calabrass, and since she wants to get out of the Triangle, the princess, with her viking bodyguard Crogar, steal Calabrass. The Atlantean princess, who reveals that her name is Christa Coraline Lejeune (Cece) attacks Zak, but when Golden Bones captures Zak, she stands by him. They battle Bones together, and then they name themselves the Seven Cs.
3	3	"Morlock the Unstoppable" "L'invincible Morlock"	Julien Magnat	4 December 2016	21 October 2017 (DFC); 1 November 2017 (Netflix)	103
When Zak goes on a treasure hunt to prove he's a worthy captain of his crew, he finds that Golden Bones went to find the exact same treasure for Skullivar as well. When Zak tries to take it from him, he is overwhelmed by Skeletons, and Cece, Crogar and Caramba run in to help him. Golden Bones and his crew got away with the chest, but left the flag, that bore the mark of Morlock on it, for the Seven Cs, instead. They took the flag to Sassafrass, who explains how dangerous Morlock is, not knowing that what she was saying was true until Skullivar builds Morlock using what was in the treasure chest, and attacks them in Marituga. When the Seven Cs are kidnapped, Zak surrenders so that Morlock, Skullivar and Golden Bones would release his crew, and take him instead. But then they fight them all together, and escape with Calabrass again.
4	4	"Witch Overboard" "Une sorcière à la mer"	Julien Magnat	5 December 2016	28 October 2017 (DFC); 1 November 2017 (Netflix)	104
While fighting a Gigantica squid, Caramba is knocked off the Chaos and into the sea, where he finds an ancient locket that holds the spirit of Xibalba, queen of the shadow realm. When the rest of the crew rescue him, he starts to get more and more powerful, until it got to the point where Zak and Calabrass saw the spirit of Xilbalba, stealing Caramba's life force. Accidentally believing Caramba, Zak is kicked off the ship and Xilbalba raised her shadow army. However, the Seven Cs managed to stop her, rescued Caramba, and trapped her back in the locket.
5	5	"Freezing Point" "Nounou Viking"	Pierre-Alain Chartier, Emmanuel Leduc and Romain van Liemt	6 December 2016	4 November 2017 (DFC); 1 November 2017 (Netflix)	105
Zak and his crew are sailing on the sea of Beru, when they see Golden Bones trying to steal an ice wyvern's egg. Zak didn't want the beast to be hurt, so himself and the crew rescued the egg. But then when Crogar was about to eat it, the egg hatched, and Crogar and the hatchling, who he named Freya, became very tight. Golden Bones chased them through Sino, and when Crogar goes to return Freya to her mother, Golden Bones captures Clovis and Cece. Zak fought him hard, and then when Golden Bones kicked Zak off the Demoniac and into the Sino sea, before he fell into the water, on Freya's orders, Freya's relatives: the other wyverns, caught him and fought Golden Bones.
6	6	"The Voice of Chaos" "La voix du Chaos"	Nicolas Verpilleux	7 December 2016	11 November 2017 (DFC); 1 November 2017 (Netflix)	106
Being chased by the Demoniac, Zak accidentally leads the Chaos right into a tornado field. While, Cece, Crogar and Clovis try their best to keep the Chaos at bay, and stop it from flying straight into a tornado, Zak and Caramba venture down into the bowels of the ship to fix an engine that was damaged, when they passed into the tornado field.
7	7	"Troll Diving" "Descente chez les Trolls"	Damian Smith	TBA	18 November 2017 (DFC); 1 November 2017 (Netflix)	107
When a group of shark-like humanoid creatures called Trolls mistake his Caramba´s exoskeleton for a golden ball, and captures him. Zak and Cece go down into the troll kingdom to rescue him, but when they try to negotiate with the troll king with a fake treasure buried in the sea of Beru in exchange for Caramba, Crogar ambushes the troll king. Zak fights the troll king, then Cece and Crogar escape with Caramba. Zak runs out of juice when he runs to the door, but Cece uses the Chaos to rescue him before he was crushed by the troll king.
8	8	"Forged in Fire" "La forge éternelle"	Dominique Latil	TBA	12 May 2018 (DFC); 1 November 2017 (Netflix)	108; 114 (DFC)
Zak accidentally springs the trap of some ancient civilisation in a pyramid on Deyser, and uses all of the powers of all of the eyes of the Seven Cs to vaporise the pyramid and prevent himself, and his crew from getting crushed. When they go to Blazz, to dunk Calabrass into the primordial flame, the only thing that would be able to heal him, they are attacked by Golden Bones. After copying Clovis's trickshot with his marbles on the Chaos, he returns the Seven Eyes to Calabrass, and escapes from Bones.
9	9	"The Seas Seven" "Infiltration"	Pierre-Alain Chartier and Emmanuel Leduc	TBA	25 November 2017 (DFC); 1 November 2017 (Netflix)	109; 108 (DFC)
After Skullivar finds a powerful Atlantean weapon called the Heptahedron, the Seven C's must infiltrate his base in order to get it back.
10	10	"Lighthouse of the Soul" "Lumière de l'âme"	François Déon	TBA	12 May 2018 (DFC); 1 November 2017 (Netflix)	110; 115 (DFC)
Zak Storm and his friends try to stop the lighthouse of Marituga from crumbling down the ground, but it's a race against time to get to the top before Golden Bones does.
11	11	"The Shipwrecked in the Sand" "Les naufragés du sable"	Cyril Tysz and Guillaume Enard	TBA	19 May 2018 (DFC); 1 November 2017 (Netflix)	111; 116 (DFC)
The Seven Cs try to locate the Lock in the Sea of Dezer and face its Guardian, Anubis.
12	12	"Spirited Away" "Partir un jour"	Julien Magnat	TBA	2 December 2017 (DFC); 1 November 2017 (Netflix)	112; 109 (DFC)
When Clovis gets kidnapped by two ghosts, Zak, Calabrass and CeCe must travel to the Sea of Zite to get him back. Trapped in ghost form, they must revert to their human bodies before seven hours is up.
13	13	"Prison Break" "En eaux troubles"	Marie Eynard and Armand Robin	TBA	26 May 2018 (DFC); 1 November 2017 (Netflix)	113; 117 (DFC)
The Seven Cs attempt to rescue legendary pirate Alan Gamble.
14	14	"The Swap" "L'échange"	Augustin Mas and Stéphanie Tallon	TBA	9 December 2017 (DFC)	114; 110 (DFC)
When infiltrating Golden Bones ship, as a result of Clovis' clumsiness, Bones claims the Chaos and Calabrass for Skullivar.
15	15	"A Jellyfish of Legend" "Une méduse de légende"	Valérie Chappelet and Olivier Croset	TBA	16 December 2017 (DFC)	115; 111 (DFC)
When every sailor comes out to use a mythical jellyfish for their own use, the Seven C's must stop them and protect the jellyfish and help it travel home.
16	16	"The Bermuda Apocalypse" "Apocalypse des Bermudes"	Nicolas Verpilleux	TBA	2 June 2018 (DFC)	116; 118 (DFC)
The Seven Cs try to find a missing spaceship that crashed down into the triangle filled with high tech technology.
17	17	"The Last Flight of Icarus" "Le dernier vol d'Icare"	Cyril Tysz and Guillaume Enard	TBA	9 June 2018 (DFC)	117; 119 (DFC)
The Seven Cs seek out Mr. Raymondi, an inventor with a flying machine, in order to investigate what Zak thinks might be the Lock of Beru.
18	18	"The Labyrinth of Minotaur" "Le Labyrinthe du Minotaure"	Augustin Mas and Stéphanie Tallon	TBA	16 June 2018 (DFC)	118; 120 (DFC)
After Caramba's exoskeleton breaks down, the Seven Cs venture into a Labyrinth on Dezer in order to get a rare crystal to power him back up.
19	19	"Lemuria Attacks" "Lémuria attaque !"	Damian Smith	13 December 2016	23 December 2017 (DFC)	119; 112 (DFC)
A Lemurian admiral and a brash, courageous pirate named Flint come to Marituga to capture CeCe and claim her as a prize in the war against Lemurians and Atlanteans. Upon creating a weapon that will destroy Marituga, Flint changes sides with Zak and the Seven Cs to stop him.
20	20	"Mutiny on the Demoniac" "Les revoltes du Demoniac"	Guillaume Mautalent and Sébastien Oursel	TBA	23 December 2017 (DFC)	120; 113 (DFC)
After Golden Bones tries to ram and destroy the Chaos, Clovis becomes human again but gets captured and helps start a revolt on board the Demoniac.
21	21	"Crogar the Terrible" "Crogar le Terrible"	Anne Ricaud	TBA	23 June 2018 (DFC)	121
Crogar is captured and hypnotized by Queen Arkana, a cobra-like mermaid who will follow her commands but can the Seven Cs return him back to normal?
22	22	"Eye of the Cyclone" "Dans l'oeil du cyclone"	Matthieu Choquet and Sébastien Thibaudeau	TBA	30 June 2018 (DFC)	122
The Seven Cs seek help from an aerian called Ceasar to open the waypoint of Aeria, but can they trust him?
23	23	"Call to Adventure" "L'appel de l'aventure"	Matthieu Choquet and Sébastien Thibaudeau	TBA	7 July 2018 (DFC)	123
Caramba repairs Zak's phone, but before Zak can call his father he has to help Alan Gamble.
24	24	"The Wiseman" "Le sage"	Guillaume Mautalentt and Sébastien Oursel	TBA	14 July 2018 (DFC)	124
The Seven Cs find a man who knows everything in the world, and the man tells them about an ultimate waypoint: a way to get out of the triangle, bypassing the other waypoints. Zak and the rest of the crew believe him, but Cece does not.
25	25	"Escape from Netherwhere" "Le héros des Bermudes"	Matthieu Choquet and Sébastien Thibaudeau	TBA	21 July 2018 (DFC)	125
Zak and the Seven Cs team up with Alan Gamble to save Caramba and stop a Netherwhere energy bomb from exploding, while they are still there.
26	26	"Thermal Shock" "Choc thermique"	Augustin Mas and Stéphanie Tallon	TBA	15 September 2018	126
The Seven Cs suffer a thermal shock, but still manage to get the better of Bones and his skeletons, and open the Sino waypoint.
27	27	"Burn Out" "La pierre du temps"	Matthieu Choquet and Sébastien Thibaudeau	TBA	15 September 2018	127
The Seven Cs are all really tired, but they agree to go on a treasure hunt for Sassafrass to find a Chronos stone that can control time and will be rendered powerless after being used once. Flint is trying to hunt for the stone as well. The Seven Cs do not perform well against Golden Bones and are destroyed with Zak and Calbrass surviving, Zak uses The Chronos stone to go back in time and save the crew and succeed. Afterwards, Golden Bones claims the powerless stone for Skullivar.
28	28	"Trial by Fire" "Duel en enfer (Duel in the Inferno)"	Matthieu Choquet and Sébastien Thibaudeau	TBA	22 September 2018	128
Stuck in a volcano on Blazz, Zak must team up with Golden Bones to open the Blazz waypoint and defeat the guardian.
29	29	"Calabrass' Old Friend" "Calabrass ne répond plus"	Valérie Chappelet and Olivier Croset	TBA	29 September 2018	129
Calabrass finds an old friend of piracy named Torg, who tries to destroy Zak and the rest of his friends but in the end, he decides to corrupt the Demoniac instead.
30	30	"Wrath of Blix" "La colère des Méduses"	François Déon	TBA	6 October 2018	130
31	31	"Calabrass' Body" "Le corps de Calabrass"	Cédric Bacconnier and Pascal Stervinou	TBA	13 October 2018	131
32	32	"Island of the Lost Children" "L'île des enfants perdus"	Guillaume Mautalent and Sébastien Oursel	TBA	20 October 2018	132
33	33	"Tanah Lost" "Tanah Lost"	Matthieu Choquet and Olivier Serrano	TBA	27 October 2018	133
34	34	"Between Stars" "Par-delà les étoiles (Beyond stars)"	Julien Magnat	TBA	3 November 2018	134
Zak and the Seven Cs meet the daughter of Sassafrass called Zephyra to help open the waypoint of Zite.
35	35	"Viking Connexion" "La bande à Crogar (Crogar's band)"	Anne Ricaud	TBA	10 November 2018	135
Zak and his friends meet a female Viking from Crogar's old band of Vikings.
36	36	"The Stowaway" "Le passager clandestin"	Cédric Bacconier and Pascal Stervinou	TBA	17 November 2018	136
37	37	"Zak's Choice" "Le choix de Zak"	Valérie Chappelet and Olivier Croset	TBA	1 December 2018	137
Zak made it home to his father but not before he and his friends back at Marituga, discover the waypoint of Beru from under the sea.
38	38	"The Lost Orb" "L'orbe perdu (The Lost Orb)"	Matthieu Choquet and Sébastien Thibaudeau	TBA	8 December 2018	138
39	39	"The Last Guardian" "Le dernier gardien"	Matthieu Choquet and Sébastien Thibaudeau	TBA	15 December 2018	139
Zak and his friends must open the waypoint of Vapor and link up the waypoints of seven elements to find a way home all while defeating the ever-powerful Skullivar and save Calabrass. So Skullivar turned the powerless stone into the Eye of Neverwhere.

== Home media ==
In 2018, Shout! Factory Kids signed a deal with ZAG Heroez to secure the North American DVD rights to Zak Storm. Other media companies that will produce home media include Koch Media in Italy, Eden Germany GmbH in Germany, and Dazzler Media in the United Kingdom.

=== Region 1 ===
In the United States and Canada, there are 4 DVD episodes from season one, with both English and French audio tracks, was released.

A first DVD, subtitled Volume 1 which was released on 13 March 2018.

A second DVD, subtitled Volume 2, which was released on 6 June 2018.

In between Volume 2 DVD and Volume 3 DVD of Zak Storm Super Pirate for 11 Months, Zagtoon concentrated for carrying on making more episodes for Miraculous Ladybug and starting episodes of a Reboot TV Series called Denver & Cliff in 2018. Then 11 months later the third DVD of Zak Storm came out in the month of May 2019.

A third DVD, subtitled Volume 3, which was released on 17 May 2019.

Then again in-between Volume 3 DVD and Volume 4 DVD of Zak Storm Super Pirate for 8 Months, Zagtoon concentrated back to carrying on making more episodes for Miraculous Ladybug and carrying on episodes of the Reboot TV Series Denver & Cliff in 2018. Then 8 months later the fourth DVD of Zak Storm came out in the month of January 2020.

A fourth DVD, subtitled Volume 4, was released on 30 January 2020.

After the fourth installment of Volume 4 DVD from Zak Storm Super Pirate, Zagtoon and stopped making more Region 1 DVDS from now on of Zak Storm Super Pirate, But Zagtoon are more releasing Region 2 DVD's of Zak Storm Super Pirate instead.

==== Region 1 DVDs ====
===== Main series =====
Region 1
Season	DVD Title	Episode Count	Aspect Ratio	Total running time	Release date
1	"Zak Storm Super Pirate Volume 1"	N/A	N/A	208 Minutes	13 March 2018
1	"Zak Storm Super Pirate Volume 2"	N/A	N/A	208 Minutes	6 June 2018
1	"Zak Storm Super Pirate Volume 3"	N/A	N/A	208 Minutes	17 May 2019
1	"Zak Storm Super Pirate Volume 4"	N/A	N/A	182 Minutes	30 January 2020

=== Region 2 ===
In the UK, the first DVD, from season One called Zak Storm Volume 1: Origins & Other Stores was released on 1 July 2019.

A second DVD, Zak Storm Volume 2: A Jellyfish of Legend and other Stories, which was released on 7 October 2019.

A third DVD, Zak Storm Volume 3: The Labyrinth of the Minotaur and Other Stories, which was released on 2 March 2020.

The 1st 3 DVDS of Zak Storm was released by Spirit Entertainment, But after Volume 3 came out on 2 March 2020, Spirit Entertainment Studio Company Left the Project of carrying on releasing Zak Storm DVDS.

So therefore, a Different Studio Company called Dazzler Media took over Spirit Entertainment and carried on releasing Zak Storm DVDS, Starting with Zak Storm Volume 4: Island of the Lost Storm & Other Stories, which was released on 3 August 2020.

The Final DVD called Zak Storm Volume 5: Viking Connexion & Other Stories, which was released on 5 October 2020.

Since 5 October 2020, ZAG decided to Shut Down Zak Storm Season 2.

==== Region 2 DVDs ====
===== Main Series =====
Region 2
Season	DVD Title	Episode Count	Aspect Ratio	Total running time	Release date
1	Zak Storm Volume 1: Origins & Other Stores	8	16:9	3 Hours and 28 Minutes	1 July 2019
1	"Zak Storm Volume 2: A Jellyfish of Legend and other Stories"	8	16:9	3 Hours and 28 Minutes	7 October 2019
1	Zak Storm Volume 3: The Labyrinth of the Minotaur and Other Stories"	8	16:9	3 Hours and 28 Minutes	2 March 2020
1	"Zak Storm Volume 4: Island of the Lost Storm & Other Stories"	8	16:9	3 Hours and 28 Minutes	3 August 2020
1	"Zak Storm Volume 5: Viking Connexion & Other Stories"	8	16:9	3 Hours and 28 Minutes	5 October 2020
