= Shelldon =

- Genre: Adventure; Comedy
- Story by: Jeffrey Scott (season 2)
- Directed by: Jirayuth Chusanachoti
- Theme music composer: Kaiwan Kulavadhanothai
- Composers: Kaiwan Kulavadhanothai; Stuart Brayson (season 2)
- Countries of origin: Thailand; Singapore (seasons 1–2); Taiwan (season 1); United States (season 1); Canada (season 1)
- Original languages: English; Thai
- No. of seasons: 3
- No. of episodes: 78

Production
- Executive producers: Jirayuth Chusanachoti; Doug Schwalbe (season 1)
- Running time: 22 minutes
- Production companies: Shellhut Entertainment; Tiny Island Productions (seasons 1–2); AniTime (season 1); BeboydCG (season 1); Classic Media (season 1); Anya Animation Company (seasons 2–3); Lunchbox Studio (seasons 2–3); Animotif (season 2); Kantana Animation Studios (season 3); Teapot Studio (season 3); Ad Hoc Animation and Ad (season 3)

Original release
- Network: Qubo (United States); Channel 3 (Thailand)
- Release: October 13, 2008 – September 30, 2012

Shelldon (Thai: เชลล์ดอน; RTGS: Chendon) is an animated children's television series directed by Jirayuth Chusanachoti. The series debuted on Channel 3 in Thailand on October 13, 2008, and on Qubo on October 16, 2009, later being removed from its line-up on September 30, 2012.

On October 2, 2026, it was announced that a Shelldon film is currently in production. The film is slated for late 2027.

== Premise ==
The series tells the adventures of Shelldon and his various friends in the fictional underwater town of Shell Land.

== Characters ==
=== Main characters ===
- Shelldon Clam (voiced by Tabitha St. Germain) is a young Yoka star shell who lives in a hotel called the Charming Clam Inn with his family. He likes helping his friends and solving problems.
- Herman (voiced by Richard Ian Cox) is a blue hermit crab with an immense infatuation with "alien" artifacts and "paranormal" events. He has a crush on a classmate Hurley.
- Connie Cowrie (voiced by Nicole Bouma) is a money cowry who works at the Charming Clam Inn, so she could do more than rely on her parents' money.

=== Recurring characters ===
- Dr. Shell (voiced by Lee Tockar) is a brilliant yet scatter-brained riversnail inventor and a guest in the Charming Clam ever since it was set up and has become something of a permanent resident there. He has traveled widely across the seas in search of inspiration but is not interested in making money, only the social benefits his inventions bring to others.
- Mama Clam (voiced by Ellen Kenndy) is a magnolia crocus clam who lives and runs the Charming Clam Inn with her husband and three children. She is a cool-headed wife and mother who is not easily daunted by hardship or challenges. Raised in the cut-throat, fast-paced Shell City, Mama Clam is savvy, a careful planner who always seems to know the perfect solution to a problem.
- Papa Clam (voiced by Colin Murdock) is a muddy-brown crocus clam that lives in and runs the Charming Clam Inn with his wife and three kids. He is guileless, none too bright, and crass at times. He is easily frazzled by setbacks and his solutions to problems tend to border on the impractical.
- Mr. Inkysquid (voiced by Scott McNeil) a small squid who is Shelldon's gang’s school teacher.
- Cracken a wealthy sea slug businessman.
- Nikki Nautilus a nautilus TV celebrity with a cult following amongst the youngsters in Shell City.
- Luther a loggerhead sea turtle who drives a taxi.
- Click and Clack two hyperactive Yoka star shells who are Shelldon's cousins.
- Hook, Sam and Mack a trio of heavy metal-addicted fishes, Hook is a Nkhomo-benga peacock, Sam is a sockeye salmon and Hook is a mackerel.
- Stan Starfish a purple starfish who is a bully at Shelldon's school.
- Captain 8-Ball an octopus pirate who lives inside of a sunken ship.
- Louise a friendly humpback whale that gives Shelldon advice.
- Dr. Bao a Chinese Haliotis discus with herbal knowledge.
- Emperor Ehru a fiddler crab who lives on a small island.
- Crabby a Christmas Island red crab who is the owner of the neighbourhood bookstore.
- Mugsley a sly hermit crab who is Cracken's henchmen.
- Napoleon a mantis shrimp that talks in a high-pitched voice.
- Wilbur a goofy seagull.
- Mayor Yoka a Yoka star shell who is Shell Land's mayor.
- Baft and Thwart a duo of greedy human scuba divers that don’t care what damage they do to the ocean or marine life.
- Shello Polo a Mexican Yoka star shell who talks to Shelldon as a ghostly figure.
- Mrs. Prim is a prissy crystal red shrimp who obsesses over her nails and hair, which causes her to forget about her peers.
- Hurley is a pink sea snail that sometimes appears in the show. She has a crush on a classmate named Herman.

== Production ==
The series is produced by Thai entertainment company Shellhut Entertainment, in co-production with Singaporean studio Tiny Island Productions for the first two seasons, Taiwanese studio AniTime and American studio Classic Media for season 1, and other Thai studios such as BeboydCG for season 1, Anya Animation Company and Lunchbox Studio Co., Ltd. for seasons 2 and 3, Animotif for season 2, and Kantana Animation Studios, Teapot Studio and Ad Hoc Animation and Ad for season 3. Voice casting for the series was handled by Giant Wave for the original version and Voice Box Productions in Canada for the English version. Distribution for the series was handled by French company Planet Nemo Animation in Europe, Canadian company DHX Media in North America and British company Entertainment Rights (season 1).

== Episodes ==
=== Season 1 ===
1. Crabby's School Daze
2. Mascot Mojo
3. Alien Encounters
4. Baby Shark Blues
5. Tide of Doom
6. Shell Gone
7. Slime, Crime and a Hard Time
8. Meet the Cowries
9. Locked Out
10. Pay Happiness Forward
11. The Guru of the Ocean
12. I, Shellbot
13. Beware the Werefish
14. Brand New Day
15. One Grain of Sand
16. Fast Food Fiasco
17. Love at the Opera
18. Trapped in the Shallows
19. Crabby's Mega Books
20. Get a Life
21. Doc Rock
22. Small Shells, Big City
23. Citizen Clam
24. You're Not Welcome
25. Shelldon Makes Waves
26. The Great Treasure

=== Season 2 ===
1. Hello Shello
2. Shelldon's Big Reward
3. One Small Step For a Friend
4. Scout's Honour
5. Never Judge a Snail By Its Shell
6. Starfish Wars
7. Take Me to Your Liter!
8. Crouching Bully, Hidden Shellfish
9. Big Mollusk on Campus
10. Click and Clack's Incredible Christmas
11. Battle of the Burgers
12. Jumbo Shrimp
13. Not So Alien After All
14. Battle of the Burgers
15. The Great Fish Race
16. Cloudy with a Chance of Styrofoam
17. A Tattle Tale
18. Attack from Otter Space
19. Liar, Liar, Shell on Fire
20. The Day Mt. Papa Erupted
21. Shelldon's Broken Promise
22. Saving Stan Starfish
23. Lost and Found Out!
24. Ghosts in the Shell Land
25. An Amusing Adventure
26. Herman Finds His Grandpa

=== Season 3 ===
1. The Ends of the Seas
2. Fish Can Fly and So Can I
3. What's Wrong With Crabby?
4. Runaways
5. Rastamon, Anemone
6. Octo-putz
7. Ice Scream
8. Mystery Mount
9. Shelldon is King
10. Winter Games
11. Crabby For Mayor
12. Tiki Kong
13. Whacked to the Future
14. Crazy Cash Crash
15. Crocodilly
16. Connie's Wild Whirl Pool
17. Leaning Tower of Pizzas
18. Kelp Kookies
19. Shelldon and the Giant Sea Stalk
20. Read All About It
21. Shelldon in the Land of Toys
22. Rock Band
23. Going for Gold
24. Genius of the Seabed
25. Dino-Fish!
26. Mobile Madness!

== Home video ==
On October 6, 2015, Mill Creek Entertainment released a DVD titled "Shelldon - Under the Sea Adventures!" containing the first two seasons of the show.
