= Chamber (character) =

Marvel Comics superhero

- Chamber as depicted in Generation X #71 (November 2000). Art by Arthur Adams.

Publication information
- Publisher: Marvel Comics
- First appearance: Generation X #1 (November 1994)
- Created by: Scott Lobdell (writer); Chris Bachalo (artist)

In-story information
- Alter ego: Jonothon "Jono" Evan Starsmore
- Species: Human mutant
- Team affiliations: Generation X X-Men; Weapon X Clan Akkaba; New Warriors; Jean Grey School; Morlocks; New Mutants
- Notable aliases: Decibel
- Abilities: Currently: Psionic pyrokinesis; Telepathy; Formerly: Sound manipulation via sonic technology

Chamber (Jonothon "Jono" Evan Starsmore; alternatively spelled Jonothan) is a superhero appearing in American comic books published by Marvel Comics. The character is usually associated with the X-Men and Generation X. First appearing in Generation X #1 (November 1994), the character was created by writer Scott Lobdell and artist Chris Bachalo.

A British mutant, Jono's body holds a powerful store of psionic energy, which he can project outwards as a concussive blast of flames. On the emergence of his power, much of his chest and lower face were destroyed, leaving him communicating telepathically. Initially joining the team of young mutants, Generation X, Chamber graduated to the X-Men team.

Chamber lost his powers on M-Day, which left him near death until Clan Akkaba restored his body and transformed him into a form resembling Apocalypse. Following his transformation, Chamber joined the New Warriors, utilizing technology that gave him sonic-based abilities. Chamber regained his powers and original appearance after the events of Age of X. He later joined the mutant nation of Krakoa and the New Mutants briefly.

== Publication history ==
Created by writer Scott Lobdell and artist Chris Bachalo, Chamber first appeared in Generation X #1 (November 1994). He appeared in the entire 75-issue series from 1994 to 2001, along with annuals and novels. After the series concluded, Chamber joined the X-Men, appearing in Uncanny X-Men #395-409 (June, 2001-July, 2002).

Chamber received a 4-issue miniseries (October, 2002-January, 2003), before appearing in Weapon X (vol. 2) #15-20 (November, 2003-March, 2004).

After the Decimation, Chamber appeared in the first issue of Generation M, before a starring role as Decibel in the New Warriors 20-issue fourth volume from 2007 to 2009.

Regaining his powers, Chamber appeared in X-Men: Legacy, Wolverine and the X-Men and the second volume of Generation X.

During the Krakoan Age of X-Men comics, Chamber appeared in many titles, notably New Mutants (vol. 4) and Legion of X. During the X-Men: From the Ashes relaunch, Chamber appeared in Weapon X-Men (vol. 2).

== Fictional character biography ==
=== Origin ===
Chamber's powers first manifest, art by Georges Jeanty

Jonothon Evan Starsmore ("Jono" to his friends) is originally from London and is a mutant who possesses a furnace of psionic energy in his chest. This power first manifested in an explosion during a party he was attending with then girlfriend Gayle Edgerton. Its initial manifestation destroyed much of his chest and lower face and crippled Gayle. Jono is left only able to communicate via telepathy, with his powers sustaining what remains of his body.

At age 18, shortly after his mutant powers manifest, Jono accepts an invitation to join Xavier's School for Gifted Youngsters. He meets the future members of Generation X - M, Husk, Synch, Skin, and Jubilee - after they arrive to save him from Emplate.

While living at the Xavier Institute, Chamber reconciles with Gayle Edgerton after they are both captured by Emplate. He later enters a relationship with Husk, but their relationship is strained as Jono believes that he cannot offer the normalcy he assumes she wants. His insecurity hinders his capability to interact with Husk platonically.

When the Xavier Institute is outed as harboring mutant students, an anti-mutant group attacks the school. After Synch is killed preventing a bomb from killing nearby human students, the Generation X kids feel that their training is over and disband the group. Chamber is considered to join the X-Men, but declines.

=== X-Man and Weapon X ===
After failing to join the X-Men, Chamber returns to London, where he hooks up with pop star Sugar Kane. The two separate after Kane's manager stages her abduction by anti-mutant forces following a phony tabloid story that she was pregnant with Chamber's child. The X-Men meet with Chamber in London and persuade him to join the team, after claiming that the X-Men offered a place that he could finally fit in. He remains on the team for some time, but often shows frustration with being treated as a junior member by his teammates and eventually asks to be relieved from active duty.

After returning to the X-Men, Chamber learns that Husk is in a relationship with Archangel. He also witnesses the death of his friend Skin, who is crucified by the Church of Humanity. Archangel saves several of the Church's victims with his healing blood, but is unable to save Skin. These events drive Chamber over the edge; he attacks Archangel and is arrested. While Chamber is in prison, Brent Jackson recruits him into the Weapon X program.

=== Decimation ===
Decimation almost destroys Chamber. Art by Scott Kolins.

Chamber is reborn as the pride of Clan Akkaba, art by Scott Kolins

Chamber is among the countless mutants who lose their powers during M-Day. Beast saves his life, but he is left unable to survive without his powers to sustain him. The X-Men leave him to be cared for at a hospital on life support.

Jono is later abducted by Frederick Slade, a member of Clan Akkaba, who are descendants of Apocalypse and distant relatives of Jono. Jono has his body restored by a transfusion of Apocalypse's blood, giving him a grey-skinned appearance resembling Apocalypse. As a descendant of Apocalypse, Jono is considered a member of the Clan but refuses to formally join them.

=== New Warriors ===
Decibel, art by Paco Medina

Jono resurfaces as Decibel, a member of Night Thrasher's New Warriors. As Decibel, Jono utilizes a high-tech suit that gives him the ability to create solidified sound constructs. He reveals that he chose these powers because he does not want to be a weapon of destruction anymore and can now create. He serves with the New Warriors until they disband.

=== Age of X ===
Jono eventually makes his way to the X-Men's new Island nation of Utopia. Shortly after his arrival, Legion rewrites history, making himself a hero. In this re-written world, Jono regains his powers, but loses the body restorations given to him by Clan Akkaba. When reality is restored, Jono retains the changes Legion made to him. After the conflict of leadership between Wolverine and Cyclops, Chamber joins Wolverine at the Jean Grey School for Higher Learning, where he teaches a course on "Coping With Physical Changes".

=== Wolverine and the X-Men ===
Chamber is entrusted with the safety and security of the Jean Grey School's students when a violent threat is roaming the halls. He is shown defending his students from an attack by Weapon Omega while giving a lecture in class. Chamber is killed while battling one of Legion's multiple personalities, but is later resurrected by Legion. When the school moves to Central Park, Chamber becomes a teacher there. He is later attacked and killed by Harpoon of the Marauders.

=== Krakoa ===
Following the establishment of Krakoa as a mutant nation, Chamber is resurrected and joins the New Mutants along with Mondo. They go on a mission to the Shi'ar empire with the intent of bringing Cannonball to Krakoa. The New Mutants are assigned to transport Deathbird to Chandilar to be Xandra Neramani's teacher. Chamber is later seen working with Nightcrawler's Legionaries.

== Powers and abilities ==
Chamber is a mutant whose body acts as a furnace of fiery psionic energy capable of nuclear fission. He has been implied to be a being of pure psionic energy; as a result, he does not require food, water, or oxygen to survive. When Chamber's mutant abilities first activated, they destroyed his chest and mouth area, leaving him to be sustained by his own energy. Chamber also possesses limited psychic abilities that enable him to project his thoughts, but do not allow him to read minds.

After he lost his powers during House of M, Chamber was rebuilt by Clan Akkaba in the image of Apocalypse and he later employed technology to mimic sonic powers as Decibel. These powers included flight, sonic blasts, and the creation of solid energy constructs. Chamber was restored to his original appearance and powers following Age of X.

== Reception ==
In 2014, Entertainment Weekly ranked Chamber 35th in their "Let's rank every X-Man ever" list.

== Other versions ==
The Age of Apocalypse incarnation of Chamber as depicted in Generation Next #1 (January 1995). Art by Chris Bachalo.

=== Age of Apocalypse ===
An alternate universe version of Chamber appears in Age of Apocalypse. This version is the leader of Generation Next under the training of Shadowcat and Colossus, who rescued him from Mikhail Rasputin. Additionally, his body remains intact due to his powers being discovered before they could activate and brought under control with a cybernetic chest plate. Chamber is killed along with the rest of his team when they infiltrate Sugar Man's lair and are abandoned by Colossus.

=== Amalgam Comics ===
Jonothon Hex, a composite character based on Chamber and DC Comics character Jonah Hex, appears in the Amalgam Comics one-shot Generation Hex.

=== Future X-Men ===
An alternate universe version of Chamber appears in Doctor Strange and the Sorcerers Supreme #10 and Uncanny X-Men: Winters End #1. This version originates from an alternate timeline 25 years in the future, where many students of the Jean Grey School of Higher Learning became celebrity heroes as adults. Additionally, Chamber gained full control of his powers, allowing him to reconstruct his body. Chamber is later killed in a battle with the Shi'ar.

== In other media ==
- Chamber makes non-speaking appearances in X-Men '97.
- Chamber appears in Marvel Snap.
