= Tiny Island Productions =

Singaporean CG animation studio

- Type: Private Limited
- Industry: Animation and Film
- Founded: 2002
- Founder: David Kwok
- Headquarters: Singapore
- Key people: David Kwok, CEO; Sharon Tan, Business Development Director
- Products: Animated feature films Animated TV series Virtual reality Stereoscopic 3D
- Number of employees: 120 (2012)
- Website: www.tinyisland.net

Tiny Island Productions is a CG animation production company based in Singapore. It specializes in both normal CG and stereoscopic 3D film productions. It produced the Ben 10: Destroy All Aliens CG movie which won the Best 3D Animated Program award at the Asian Television Awards 2012 as well as the Dream Defenders television series.

== History ==
Tiny Island Productions was founded in 2002 by animation veteran David Kwok. As of 2012, the company has 120 employees. One of its first major productions was the Shelldon animated TV series, which it co-developed and co-produced with Shellhut Entertainment.

=== Dream Defenders ===
The production house created Singapore's first 3D Stereoscopic animated series Dream Defenders (also known as Dream Defenders Adventures), which debuted in 2011 on 3net, a 3D channel which was a joint venture between Discovery Communications, Sony and IMAX Corporation. It was one of the channel's first stereoscopic-3D cg animated series. The series was picked up by Hulu and Discovery Family, and has aired in more than 60 countries.

=== Ben 10: Destroy All Aliens ===
In 2012, the studio produced Cartoon Network's Ben 10: Destroy All Aliens for both regular and 3D screens. The movie was adapted into full CG based on the original Ben 10 TV series The film won the Best 3D Animated Program award at the Asian Television Awards 2012.

=== G-Fighters ===
G-Fighters began production in 2013. This action-adventure superhero television series is a co-production between South Korean animation production house Electric Circus and Tiny Island. It is the first international co-production between Korea and Singapore animation companies. The animated TV series is supported by SBA, Korea Creative Content Agency, Educational Broadcasting System, SK Broadband and CJ E&M Pictures.

=== Virtual Reality ===
In 2016, Tiny Island Productions, in collaboration with Cisco Systems's PR Agency Allison+Partners, helped the technology company to create its first interactive 3D virtual reality demo. The demo placed the user inside a virtual network under cyber-attacks which would be dealt with by Cisco's advanced security solutions. Originally targeted towards influencers and analysts, it was later opened to clients directly after initial response.

=== Metaverse ===
In 2021, Tiny Island Productions signed an MOU with Huawei Technologies to develop a metaverse called Tiny Island Universe. Conceived as a virtual theme park with malls and socialization spaces, it will be created using Huawei's Cloud and AI development platforms.

== Awards ==
Ben 10: Destroy All Aliens won the Best 3D Animated Program award at the Asian Television Awards 2012 and the Gold Award for Best Movie Campaign at the 2012 ProMax Awards. Sunny Saha of Turner International commended the high level of animation talents in Asia.

Dream Defenders won the Best 3D Animation award at the Asia Image Apollo Awards 2013.

== Upcoming productions ==
Announced in 2012, Tiny Island Productions would work with Shellhut Entertainment to produce the stereoscopic 3D animated film of Shelldon.

The studio signed a 10 feature-film co-production deal in 2017 with Shellhut Entertainment and Shanghai Media Group's WingsMedia. The first film, to be completed for theatrical release in 2020, would be partially based on the company's Dream Defenders series.

== Productions ==
- Shelldon (2009)
- Ben 10: Destroy All Aliens (2012)
- Dream Defenders (2011-2012)
- Talking Tom and Friends (2014–2021)
