= Spawn: Godslayer =

Comic book series (2007-2008)

- Spawn: Godslayer #1

Publication information
- Publisher: Image Comics
- Schedule: Monthly
- Format: Ongoing series
- Publication date: May 2007 – April 2008
- No. of issues: 8

Creative team
- Created by: Brian Holguin; Todd McFarlane
- Written by: Brian Holguin
- Penciller(s): Philip Tan; Jay Anacleto
- Inker: Philip Tan
- Colorist: Brian Haberlin

Spawn: Godslayer, created by Brian Holguin, is a comic book series published by Image Comics. The series is a re-imagining of the popular Spawn franchise, taking place within a medieval fantasy setting rather than the main Spawn universe. Spawn: Godslayer is also the name of a special published in October 2006 set before the events of the series.

== Plot ==
Spawn: Godslayer is set in a world of epic fantasy. A mysterious warrior with a dark blade is waging war against the gods, killing them one by one.

The protagonist is a warrior prince named Bairn from the island kingdom of Endra-La. During a naval battle, Bairn is wounded and thrown overboard. Sinking to the bottom of the sea and dying, Bairn says he would give anything to see his love, Neva, again. A mysterious, eldritch entity answers his dying plea.

In exchange for saving Bairn, the entity makes the prince his undead servant and orders him to kill the gods of Ur. Neva, thinking that Bairn is dead, devotes herself to the temple of the goddess Llyra and eventually becomes her vessel.

== Special ==
Many years after his ordeal, Bairn sails to Endra-La. Commanding a mighty ship, he breaks through the kingdom's defenses. He finds Neva, now an old woman, in the temple of Llyra. She pleads with him, but he kills her without saying a word. Neva forgives Bairn with her final breath. Enraged, Llyra appears, and Bairn kills her as well, completing his task.

== Series ==
Set immediately after the Godslayer special, Bairn returns to his stronghold, with the spirit of his beloved Neva haunting him. Neva is a phantom to Bairn at first, but becomes visible to him when he attempts to remove his memories with nepenthe. Bairn relates the tale of his death and rebirth to Neva, but before he can say more he is summoned by his dark master to slay the Winter God, Urshrek. In his absence, Neva seemingly makes a pact similar to Bairn's with the mysterious dark master.

Bairn slays Urshrek, and is rescued from the sea by Neva, who has been transformed into an undead warrior similar to the Godslayer. The two sail to Endra-La and recover Neva's bones, which transform her into her original self. She then bids Bairn farewell and disappears.

Bairn, inconsolable after Neva's disappearance, returns to his mission to rid the world of the gods. He eventually makes his way back to his stronghold, once again escaping into dreamless sleep to forget his sins.

== Cancellation ==
Spawn: Godslayer was canceled after its 8th issue due to low sales. A note from the author in the back of issue 8 mentions that the further adventures of the Godslayer cast and the fate of their universe are tales that will have to remain untold, for now.
