= Anomaly (graphic novel) =

Anomaly is a 2012 graphic novel with augmented reality elements, written by Brian Haberlin and Skip Brittenham, depicting the adventures of a disgraced soldier on an alien planet.

== Setting ==
The story occurs partly in the 'Conglomerate', a cabal of business corporations ruling a dystopian, interplanetary human society, and partly on 'Planet Anomaly', an Earthlike world populated by multiple hominoid species.

=== Natives to Anomaly ===
- Gigantus: strongly built, hairless, peaceful giants; the most-solitary species depicted.
- Muties/Kindred: A highly various species or collection of species; antagonists to all other inhabitants of Anomaly.
- Breeds: meter-high, pallid, partly furred primatoids.
- People: Apparently identical to Earthly humans, living in a quasi-Celtic society.
- Moncs: similar to Gigantus, but smaller and more squat-formed. The most-civilized of Anomaly's natives. Able to become invisible when immobile.
- Nikdo: Scavengers; treated as outcastes by most other peoples, but tolerated to consume dead bodies.
- Slow Walkers: Described as a Maasai-like ethnicity, but taller and implied to shed their skins periodically. Peacetime allies of the People.
- Bloksus: Squat, heavily built, sharp-toothed hominoids; described as 'the strongest species on Anomaly'; alcoholic on social occasions.
- Nolac/Cave Demons: A ferocious, secretive species; approximately 5–6 meters tall and immensely strong; ungulate, but possessed of sharp teeth and opposable thumbs.
- Teana: Blue-skinned nomads of small stature.
- Kerberos: Allies of the Muties; the tallest named species. Distinguished by a multiplicity of sense-organs giving the semblance of triple heads.

=== Dinosaurs ===
A variety of Mesozoic reptiles appear as steeds or mounts throughout the story:

- Homalocephale
- Pachycephalosaurus
- Prosaurolophus
- Oviraptor
- Styracosaurus
- Einiosaurus
- Chasmosaurus
- Muttaburrasaurus
- Postosuchus

And numerous therapods. Also apparent, but not ridden, are Archaeopteryx, Pteranodon, and a Nothosaur.

== Synopsis ==
At the beginning of the story, protagonist 'Jon' is an 'Enforcer' (a soldier of the Conglomerate) disgraced by a genocide permitted by himself, assigned as bodyguard to 'Samantha', a Conglomerate official's stepdaughter, who leads an expedition to Anomaly in hope of peaceful first contact, only to be foiled when a native bacterium destroys most of her followers' machinery. The expedition are thence captured by Muties and recaptured by the People. When ordered either to challenge the warlord 'Caderyn', or swear loyalty thereto, Jon challenges and later vanquishes him. He is then informed by prophetess 'Dagda' that the Muties, under their new leader 'Erebos', intend annihilation of their neighbors, and requests Jon himself to unite the native species, thitherto constantly at war, against them. Guided by Caderyn and Dagda's pupil 'Aine', Jon does so, while Samantha and polymath 'Tonni' increase the People's counter-offensive power, and Erebos plots to capture the Earthlings' Space Shuttle and invade other planets. In the story's climax, the Mutie army is destroyed, while Erebos attempts to seize the shuttle. Following him, Jon and Dagda kill Erebos and establish peace on Anomaly. In the celebration that follows, Jon plots to disarm the Conglomerate by spreading the bacterium which earlier consumed his own people's technology.

== Appendices ==
A series of these recount in detail the Conglomerate's history and Anomaly's principal religion, which follows a Socratic or Confucius-like prophet named 'Dlotinus', but resembles Taoist mysticism.

== Augmentations ==
By installation, on some hand-held computers, of a program included in the book, readers can view on-screen a three-dimensional, and sometimes mobile image of the illustration of a particular page, accompanied by audio-records of the in-universe name. No information here is indispensable to the story.
