= Clayton Henry =

American comic book artist

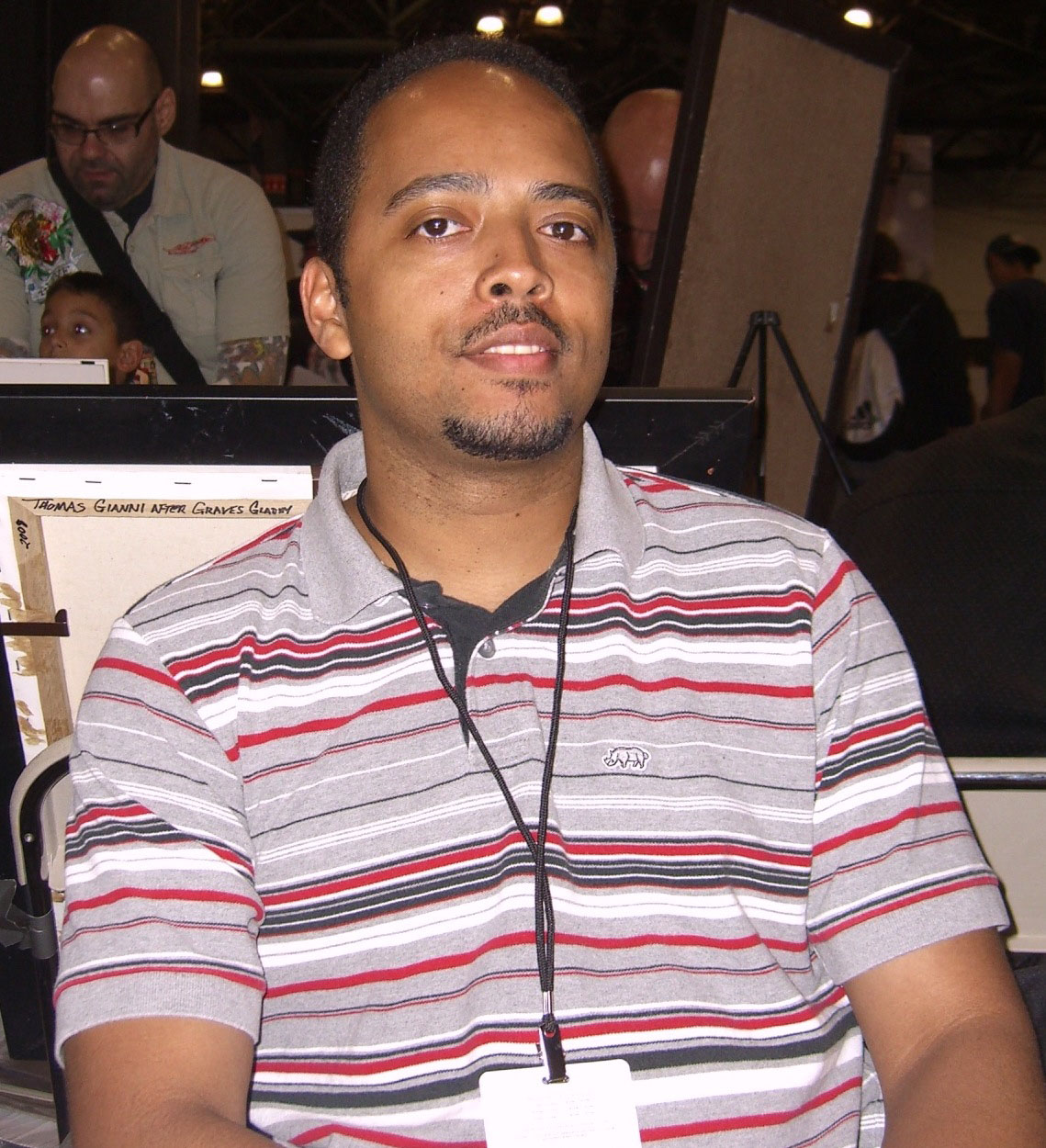
- Henry at the New York Comic Con in Manhattan, October 10, 2010
- Born: Mandeville, Jamaica
- Areas: Penciller, Inker

Clayton Henry is an American comic book artist, known mostly for his work for Marvel Comics. His first known works were providing the art on Nine Rings of Wu-Tang and Area 52, and has since worked on such series as Exiles, Alpha Flight, New X-Men: Hellions, X-Men: Apocalypse vs. Dracula, and currently Uncanny X-Men.

== Early life ==
Born in Mandeville, Jamaica, Henry moved to the U.S. when he was three. He began drawing at 4 and at age 9 he was drawn into the world of comics with a copy of Uncanny X-Men #201. Henry attended art schools from 4th grade through 12th grade and much of college.

== Career ==
After a brief stint in independent comics with Nine Rings of Wu-Tang and Area 52, Henry spent his time making ends meet.

After several rejection letters, Henry shopped his work around the convention circuit where he was hired by Marvel Comics. Soon he was given a spot on X-Men Unlimited. This eventually led to him being placed on the "Unnatural Instincts" storyline of Exiles. He later worked on Alpha Flight, which was cancelled after twelve issues due to poor sales. Soon he was placed on several other X-Men related projects, including New X-Men: Hellions, and X-Men: Apocalypse vs. Dracula. His work also includes assisting Chris Bachalo with finishing up the "Supernovas" storyline and doing art for Uncanny X-Men.

His most recent work is at DC Comics on the Legion of Super-Heroes story in Adventure Comics.

== Bibliography ==
=== Interior work ===
- The Nine Rings of Wu-Tang (pencils, with writers Aaron Bullock/Brian Haberlin, Avalon Studios (Image Comics), 1999–2000)
- Area 52 (with Brian Haberlin, 4-issue mini-series, Image Comics, 2001)
- X-Men Unlimited #40: "Animals" (pencils, with writer Chuck Austen and inks by Mark Morales, Marvel Comics, February 2003)
- Exiles #26-31, 35, 37 (with writer Chuck Austen and inks by Mark Morales, Marvel Comics, July 2003 - January 2004)
- Alpha Flight (vol. 3) #1-6, 9-12 (pencils, with writer Scott Lobdell and inks by Mark Morales, Marvel Comics, 2004–2005)
- New X-Men: Hellions (pencils, with writers Nunzio DeFilippis/Christina Weir and inks by Mark Morales, 4-issue mini-series, July–October 2005)
- X-Men: Apocalypse vs. Dracula (pencils, with writer Frank Tieri and inks by Mark Morales, 4-issue mini-series, Marvel Comics, April–June 2006)
- Incredible Hercules #121-125 (with writer Greg Pak/Fred Van Lente, Marvel Comics, November 2008–March 2009)
- Agents of Atlas (vol. 3) #3-4 (with writer Jeff Parker, Marvel Comics, April–June 2009)
- Adventure Comics #1-: "Long Live the Legion" (with writer Geoff Johns, DC Comics, October 2009–ongoing)
- Archer & Armstrong #0-4, #24-25 (pencils, with writer Fred Van Lente, August 2012–October 2014)
- Harbinger (Valiant Comics series) #20-23, #25 (pencils, with writer Joshua Dysart, January 2014-July 2014)
- Harbinger Wars #1–4 (pencils, with writer Joshua Dysart and Duane Swierczynski, April–July 2013)
- Adventures of Superman: Jon Kent (with writer Tom Taylor, March–August 2023)

=== Cover work ===
- Fantastic Five #1-5 (Marvel Comics, September–December 2007)
