= The Nine Rings of Wu-Tang =

1999 comic book

Publication information
- Publisher: Image comics
- Format: Ongoing series
- No. of issues: 5
- Main character: Wu-Tang Clan

Creative team
- Created by: Aaron V. Bullock, Brian Haberlin, RZA
- Written by: Aaron V. Bullock, Brian Haberlin
- Penciller: Clayton Henry

The Nine Rings of Wu-Tang is a 1999 comic book based on the hip hop group the Wu-Tang Clan. The Wu-Tang Clan members are re-imagined as Spanish based mystic martial artists who save the world.
