= X-Men: Apocalypse vs. Dracula =

Comic book by Marvel

- Cover of issue #1, by Jae Lee.

Publication information
- Publisher: Marvel Comics
- Schedule: Monthly
- Format: Limited series
- Genre: Horror, superhero
- Publication date: April - July 2006
- No. of issues: 4
- Main character(s): Apocalypse; Dracula

Creative team
- Written by: Frank Tieri
- Penciller(s): Clayton Henry; Jae Lee (Covers only)
- Inker(s): Mark Morales; Chris Livesay
- Colorist: Rus Wooton

X-Men: Apocalypse vs. Dracula is a four-issue comic book limited series published in 2006 by Marvel Comics. The series was written by Frank Tieri and drawn by Clayton Henry.

== Plot ==
Centuries ago, prior to becoming a vampire, Vlad Tepes lost in battle against the ageless mutant Apocalypse. Now in the days of 19th-century London, Dracula is seeking revenge for his past defeat and is turning members of Apocalypse's clan into vampires. Apocalypse is awoken from his slumber to take battle against Dracula, and with Abraham Van Helsing at his side.

== Collected editions ==
The series has been collected into a trade paperback:

X-Men: Apocalypse / Dracula (96 pages, October 2006 ISBN 0-7851-1948-5)

== See also ==
- 2006 in comics
