= Kiss: Psycho Circus =

Comic book series

- Cover of the first issue

Publication information
- Publisher: Image Comics
- Schedule: Monthly
- Publication date: 1997–2000
- No. of issues: 31
- Main character: Kiss

Creative team
- Written by: Brian Holguin
- Penciller: Angel Medina
- Inker: Kevin Conrad
- Letterer(s): Kiff Scholl, Richard Starkings
- Colorist(s): Brian Haberlin, Dan Kemp, Andy Troy

Kiss: Psycho Circus is a comic book series published by American companies Image Comics and Todd McFarlane Productions. It was written by Brian Holguin and illustrated by various artists, including pencillers Angel Medina and Clayton Crain with inker Kevin Conrad. It portrays the members of the rock band Kiss as supernatural beings known as the Four-Who-Are-One or The Elder: the Demon (Gene Simmons), the Starbearer (Paul Stanley), the King of Beasts or Beastking (Peter Criss) and the Celestial (Ace Frehley).

== Background and creation ==
For over two decades, comics featuring Kiss were published exclusively by Marvel Comics. Kiss decided to switch to Todd McFarlane Productions out of admiration for their series Spawn. Gene Simmons said that "The concept came from us. 'The Psycho Circus' is a tour theme we're working on, and we may even use the title for an album."

Kiss were also involved in plotting the comic, according to Simmons: "I throw something to Todd, he throws it back. I'm always kept in the loop, but I leave Todd to his own devices when it comes to actual production and taking things the final step."

== Characters ==
The following descriptions are taken from the comic:

The Demon - Lord of the Wasteland - Creature of fire and shadow, blood and thunder. He embodies vengeance and terror, the darkest impulses of mortal souls, but also the purgative flames of rebirth, destruction that precedes creation. His is the element of fire.

Host: Johnathon Blackwell the Ringmaster

The Starbearer - Prince of Hearts - He who draws from the deep wells of the soul and emotion, bringer of passion and pain. He can move a heart to tender love or murderous rage. His is the element of water.

Host: Fortunado L'Etoile the Jester

King of Beasts - Lord of the Hunt - Personifies the primal animal instinct, the rough beast that stirs in each of us. Embracing instinct rather than intellect, he knows neither cruelty nor mercy. His is the element of earth.

Host: Tiberius MacLir the Animal Wrangler

The Celestial - Scion of the Cosmos - Represents the principles of universal balance, the ultimate harmony of the cosmos. Observes situations dispassionately and sees all sides of a dilemma. His is the element of air.

Host: Matthew Stargrave the Stiltwalker

Adam Moon Adam Moon is a supporting character that's reappeared multiple times in the series, including in issue 1 and 2 and 29, 30, 31. He is a young boy whose dad beats him and hates his life and town. The Demon was the member of the Elder that reached out to him.

Kismet Kismet is a "disappearing girl" who's had weird dreams about running down a hall, putting on a mask and coming to a door with the Elder sigils on it. She reappears multiple times in the comics, but first appears in issue 4. She becomes a member of the circus.

Madam Raven A witch who is damned to the Psycho Circus. She is usually the first member of the circus to speak to any mortal character, and is a Fortune Teller at the circus. She appears in almost every issue, and is one of the biggest characters in the comics.

== Video game ==
The comic book spawned the first-person shooter video game Kiss: Psycho Circus: The Nightmare Child, which featured many characters from the comic book. It was released on PC and later ported to Dreamcast. It was very popular among Kiss fans but critically it sits with an average score of 71% for the PC version and 52% on Dreamcast according to GameRankings.
