= The Nightmarist =

Graphic novel by Duncan Rouleau

- Date: March 2006
- Page count: 180 pages
- Publisher: Active Images

Creative team
- Writers: Duncan Rouleau
- Artists: Duncan Rouleau
- Letterers: Richard Starkings
- Editors: Joe Kelly

Original publication
- Language: English
- ISBN: 0976676184

The Nightmarist is an original graphic novel written and illustrated by Duncan Rouleau and published by Active Images in 2006.

== Reception ==
- "This is a dark fantasy that is denser and more layered than most manga, but like nothing coming out of the major U.S. comics publishers. A−" – Bag and Boards, Variety.com 2006

== Film ==
The Nightmarist has been optioned by Paramount Pictures and Duncan Rouleau has completed the script adaptation.
