= M. Rex =

Comic book series that inspired Generator Rex

Publication information
- Publisher: Image Comics
- Format: Limited series
- Genre: Superhero
- Publication date: 1999
- No. of issues: 2
- Main character(s): Rex, Agent Six, Knight, The HaHa, Mia Moore, Simon Babbage, Spilken

Creative team
- Created by: Joe Kelly, Duncan Rouleau
- Inker(s): Aaron Sowd, Jose Guillen, Chauncey Pierce, Bryan Callaway, JAG, Alp Altiner, Curtis Arnold, Erfan Ardestani
- Letterer: Dennis Heisler
- Colorist: Haberlin Studios
- Editor(s): Brian Holguin, Brian Haberlin

M. Rex (short for Machina Rex) is a comic book title published by Image Comics's subsidiary Avalon. It began and concluded in 1999, running for only two issues, yet it would later serve as inspiration for the Cartoon Network animated series Generator Rex.

== Background ==
Avalon Studios was formed in 1999 by Filipino comic book writer Whilce Portacio and American colorist Brian Haberlin. M. Rex was one of the studio's first titles. Created by Joe Kelly and Duncan Rouleau, the series ran for two issues: The Actress, The Agent, and The Apprentice and Size Matters. Issue #1 was penciled by Duncan Rouleau, inked by Aaron Sowd and Jose Guillen assisted by Chauncey Pierce and Bryan Callaway, colored by Haberlin Studios, lettered by Dennis Heisler, and edited by Brian Holguin and Brian Haberlin. Issue #2 was inked by JAG, Alp Altiner, Curtis Arnold, and Aaron Sowd assisted by Bryan Callaway and Erfan Ardestani, colored by Haberlin Studios, lettered by Dennis Heisler, and edited by Brian Haberlin.
