= Clan Akkaba =

Fictional cult appearing in Marvel Comics

- Clan Akkaba Symbol

Publication information
- Publisher: Marvel Comics
- First appearance: X-Men: Apocalypse vs. Dracula #1 (April 2006)
- Created by: Frank Tieri; Clayton Henry

In-story information
- Type of organization: Religious Cult; Terrorist
- Base(s): Various
- Leader(s): Apocalypse
- Agent(s): Ozymandias; Kabar Brashir; Margaret Slade; Hamilton Slade; Frederick Slade; Jack Starsmore; Blink; Chamber

Clan Akkaba is a fictional cult appearing in American comic books published by Marvel Comics. The cult appears in X-Men comic books and was created by Frank Tieri and Clayton Henry. Members of the cult are the descendants of the mutant supervillain Apocalypse and first appeared in the X-Men: Apocalypse vs. Dracula miniseries.

== History ==
=== Origins ===
Akkaba was originally a small settlement in ancient Egypt located near the Valley of the Kings. Its residents were highly superstitious, which led them to cast out one of their own: a newborn with grey skin. Baal and the Sandstormers later massacred the entire village while searching for the child. Baal took the child in, naming him En Sabah Nur.

=== Domination ===
As an adult, En Sabah Nur became known as Apocalypse, overthrew Pharaoh Rama-Tut, and took control of Egypt. He founded Clan Akkaba, named after his birthplace. At this point, the clan began forming customs, most notably living by the mentality of survival of the fittest. Members would deceive, betray and even kill their own kin to get closer to Apocalypse. Following a series of attacks by Alexander the Great and his armies, the clan migrated to Ancient Rome.

=== 19th century ===
Victorian Clan Akkaba.

For thousands of years, Clan Akkaba safeguards the legacies and mantras of their lord and ancestor. Once in the new world, they accumulate wealth and acquire influential positions to better influence and control the world. The clan's members formally adopt the custom of marking themselves with a tattoo of their clan's sigil. The more powerful the individual member's level of mutant power, the larger their tattoo is.

=== Dracula ===
Clan Akkaba vs. Dracula's vampires.

During the Victorian era, the clan is attacked by Dracula and nearly exterminated. In 1897, Clan Akkaba's leader Hamilton Slade disappears, forcing them to summon Apocalypse to combat Dracula. Unbeknownst to the members of the clan, Dracula had been turning some of them into vampires to battle Apocalypse. As punishment for being weak in requesting a boon from him, Apocalypse kills one of the members of the Akkaba.

In the ensuing battle, all of Clan Akkaba's members are killed except for Jack Starsmore and Frederick Slade. The group then disbands by decree of Apocalypse. With help from Apocalypse and Abraham Van Helsing, they manage to kill Dracula, who would later return. The continuation of the Akkaba line is secured by Ozymandias through Frederick Slade having a child with a woman referred to as Miss Ferguson, who is implied to be an ancestor of Blink. Ozymandias, realizing an opportunity to get revenge on Apocalypse, secretly plans to reshape the clan in his image for use against his lord eventually.

=== Re-Birth ===
The New Clan Akkaba

The new Clan Akkaba assembles in modern times under Ozymandias and an elderly Fredrick Slade. It is revealed that Chamber is a member of their bloodline and a descendant of Jack Starsmore. Chamber had recently lost his powers during M-Day, leaving him near death without his powers to sustain his body. Chamber is rejuvenated after being infused with Apocalypse's blood, which transforms him into a grey-skinned form resembling Apocalypse. Chamber's transformation also restores his chest and mouth, which were destroyed when his powers first activated. As a descendant of Jack Starsmore, Chamber is considered to join Clan Akkaba, but refuses.

=== The Apocalypse Solution ===
After Apocalypse is taken away by the Celestials, Clan Akkaba creates a young clone of him named Evan Sabahnur. Evan is raised by Clan Akkaba, who tells him that the X-Men are tyrants and Apocalypse is a savior. Psylocke and Archangel both attempt to kill Evan, but decide against doing so. They agree to take Evan in and train him, only for Fantomex to kill him.

=== Dark Angel Saga ===
The Death Seed in Archangel's body activates, causing him to take control of Clan Akkaba and attempt to become Apocalypse's successor. He and Dark Beast travel to Akkaba Metropolis, a city located underneath the North Pole and established by Clan Akkaba. After taking the Life Seed, Archangel attempts to start a new evolutionary line in an isolated location. After this plan fails and Angel is cured of the Death Seed, Dark Beast takes control of Clan Akkaba.

The Apocalypse Twins, the children of Archangel and Pestilence, later travel to the Metropolis and destroy the city, killing most of Clan Akkaba's members.

== Powers and abilities ==
Each member of Clan Akkaba possesses a degree of Apocalypse's shapeshifting ability. Several members possess unique abilities, such as fire breath (Jack Starsmore) and spatial displacement (Blink and Frederick Slade). Starsmore's descendant Jonothon has similar fire-based abilities, which are psionic in nature.
