= Brian Holguin =

American comic book writer (1964–2026)

Brian Holguin (/ɔːlˈɡiːn/; 1964 – August 14, 2026) was an American comic book writer.

== Life and work ==
Holguin is known for his work on Aria and Todd McFarlane's Spawn.

He also wrote Cyber Force and Spawn: Godslayer, a dark fantasy re-imagining of Spawn.

Holguin died on August 14, 2026, at the age of 61.

== Partial bibliography ==
=== Aria (1999) ===
- Aria/Angela: Heavenly Creatures (2000)
- Aria: The Soul Market (2001)
- Aria: A Midwinter's Dream (2002)
- Aria: Summer's Spell (2002)
- Aria: The Uses of Enchantment (2003)

=== Cyberforce (1996–1997) ===
- Cyberforce issues #18-35

=== KISS: Psycho Circus (1997) ===
- KISS: Psycho Circus Vol. 1

=== More Than Mortal: Otherworlds (1999) ===
- More Than Mortal: Otherworlds issues 1-4

=== Mr Majestic (1999) ===
- Mr Majestic with co-writer Joe Casey and artist Ed McGuiness (trade paperback collects Mr Majestic Vol 1. Nos 1–6)

=== Spawn (1998–2005, 2008–1009) ===
- Spawn issues 71–150, 185–190

=== Spawn: The Dark Ages (1999–2000) ===
- Spawn: The Dark Ages issues 1–14

=== Spawn Godslayer (2008–2009) ===
- Issues 1-8

=== Savior (2015) ===
- Issues 1-8

=== Medieval Spawn/Witchblade (2018) ===
- Issues 1-4
