= Sunny Saha =

Soumitra Saha
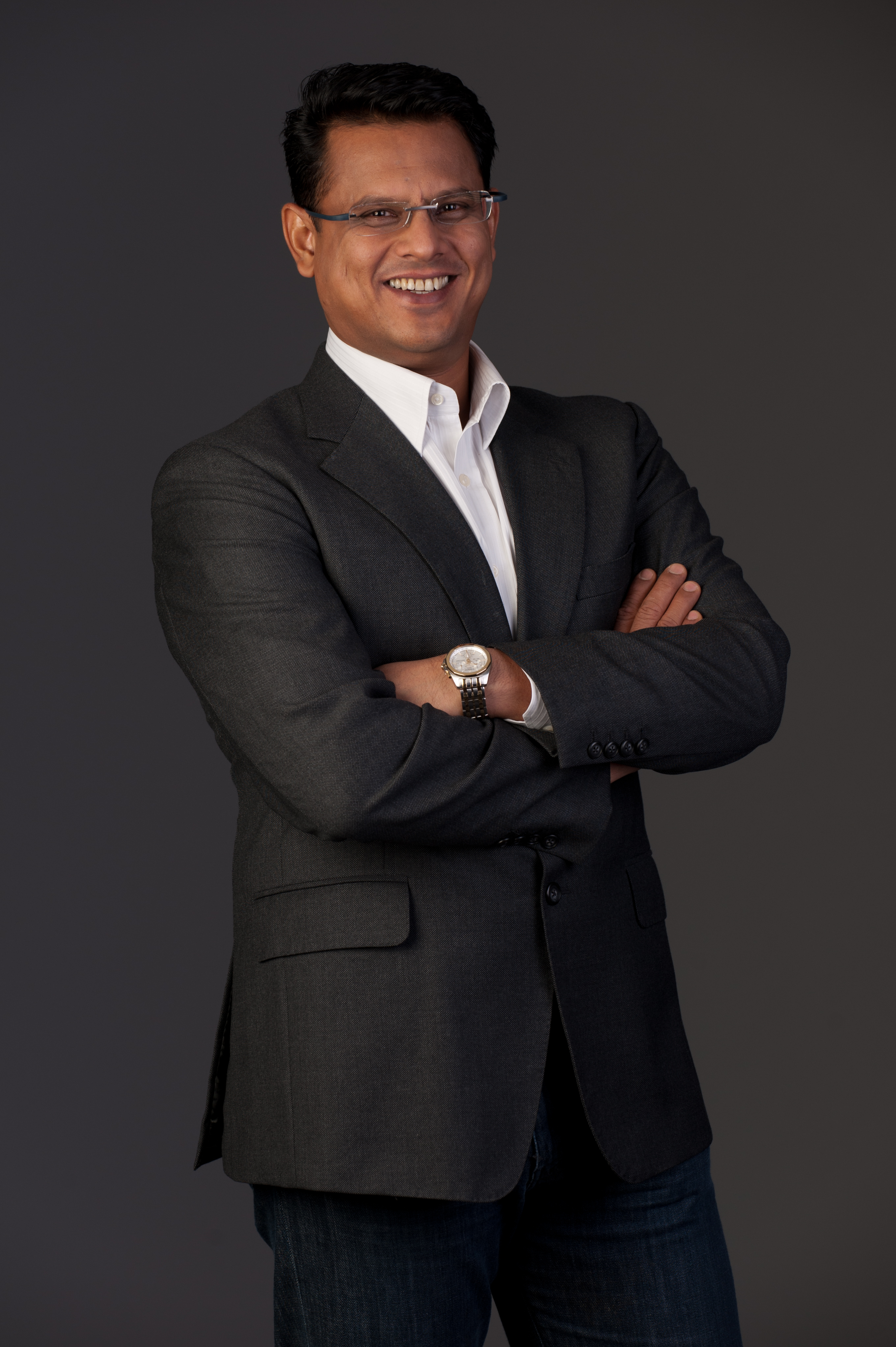
- Known for: Asia Pacific TV Broadcasting

Soumitra ‘Sunny’ Saha (born August 1972) has been Senior Vice President and Managing Director of Turner Broadcasting System’s (part of Time Warner) Southeast Asia Pacific business, and the General Manager of its Kids networks in Asia Pacific.

== Career history ==
=== Summary ===
Since joining Turner Broadcasting in September 2000, Saha led, in turn, advertising sales and research for India & South Asia; the Asia Pacific regional advertising sales, promotional licensing, marketing, interactive, and research teams; all kids and general entertainment networks across Asia Pacific; and most recently the company’s business for Southeast Asia Pacific. He had strategic oversight of Turner’s kids business across the Asia Pacific region. He launched several TV channels, built five kids brands in the Asia Pacific region, and expanded Turner’s portfolio by developing general entertainment brands in India, Japan, Korea and Southeast Asia.

=== Early years ===
Saha began his career at the Indian Market Research Bureau as a Research Executive in 1995. He was part of the team that launched TAM Media Research in India, one of the most comprehensive TV audience measurement services in the world. During his tenure, Saha trained professionals of the Indian media industry (broadcasters, advertisers, media agencies and analysts) on audience analytics and planning.
