= Duncan Rouleau =

American comic book writer and artist

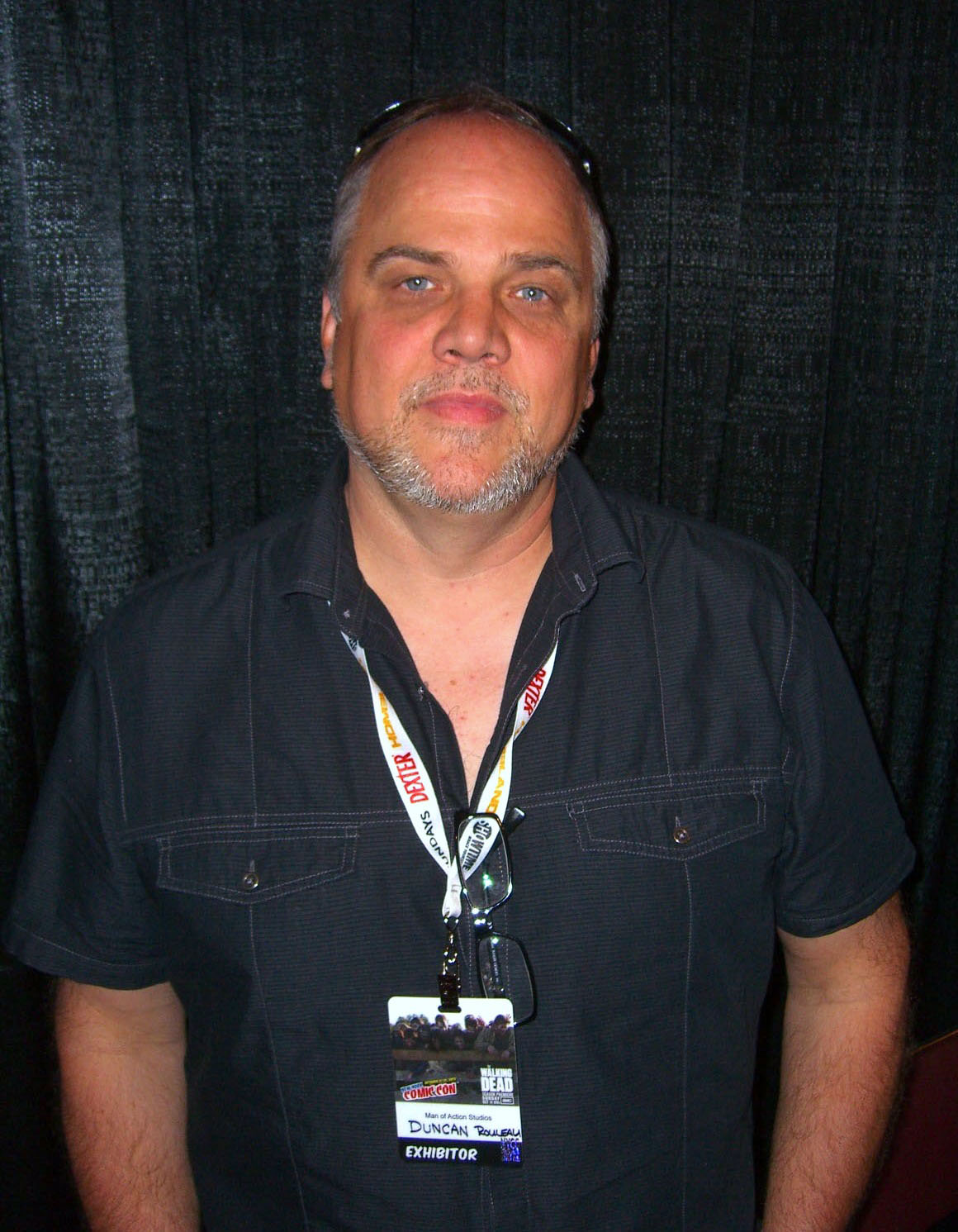
- Areas: Writer, Penciller, Inker
- Notable works: The Nightmarist

Duncan Rouleau is an American comic book writer and artist, and is a part of the Man of Action Studios collective of creators (along with Joe Casey, Joe Kelly, Steven T. Seagle), who created the series Ben 10, that aired on Cartoon Network.

== Career ==
Rouleau has illustrated a variety of popular American comic books for Dark Horse Comics, DC Comics, Image Comics, Marvel Comics, and other publishers. He illustrated and co-wrote the 8-issue miniseries of The Metal Men in 2007 by DC Comics. Steven T. Seagle and Rouleau also created the Marvel Comics super-hero team Big Hero 6.

In 2001, Rouleau co-founded Man of Action Entertainment, a creative think tank and production house, along with fellow partners and comic book creators Joe Casey, Joe Kelly, and Steven T. Seagle. Man of Action scripted four short films for an independent producer before being tapped to write the script for Activision's highly successful X-Men: Legends video game. Their third professional credit was the original animation series Ben 10 which they created and sold to Cartoon Network. The original series ran for 52 episodes and has so far spawned sequel series Ben 10: Alien Force, Ben 10: Ultimate Alien, Ben 10: Omniverse, two live action made-for TV-movies, and a live stage show. Their second original creation for Cartoon Network, Generator Rex, has aired over forty episodes to date, launched a merchandise line, and crossed over with Ben 10 in 2011. Rouleau serves as the co-executive producer on Ultimate Spider-Man on Disney XD, which premiered in April 2012. In 2013, Rouleau also serves as co-executive producer on Disney XD's Avengers Assemble. The 2014 Disney animated film Big Hero 6 is based on the Marvel Comics team co-created by Rouleau.

In 2006, Rouleau released his first original graphic novel, The Nightmarist, published by Active Images.

In 2016, Rouleau served as the creator of the Ben 10 reboot.

He is one of the writers on the 2022 Netflix 3D animated series Sonic Prime.

== Bibliography ==
Title	Credit	Year	Publishing Company
Venom: The Hunted #1-3	Artist	1996	Marvel Comics
X-Men Unlimited vol. 1 #13 (artist, cover artist, Marvel Comics, 1996)	Artist, Cover Artist	1996	Marvel Comics
The Uncanny X-Men Annual vol. 1 #21	Artist, Cover Artist	1997	Marvel Comics
X-Factor vol. 1 #140	Artist, Inker	1997	Marvel Comics
X-Factor vol. 1 #143-144	Artist, Cover Artist	1998	Marvel Comics
M. Rex #1-2	Artist, Cover Artist (w/ Joe Kelly)	1999	Image Comics
Action Comics #796	Artist	2002	DC Comics
Action Comics #800	Artist, Inker	2003	DC Comics
Teen Titans vol. 3 #20	Cover Artist	2005	DC Comics
The Nightmarist	Writer, Artist	2006	Active Images
Adventures of Superman #649	Artist	2006	DC Comics
Blue Beetle #5, 9	Artist	2006	DC Comics
52 #30	Artist, Inker	2006	DC Comics
The New X-Men #29	Artist, Inker	2006	Marvel Comics
The Metal Men #1-8	Artist, (Writer/Inker on #4)	2007	DC Comics
"Hell Hath No Fury" DC Universe Halloween Special	Artist, Writer	2008	DC Comics
"Territorealis" DC Goes Ape	Artist	2008	DC Comics
"Black Alice" L'Elmo di Fate	Artist	2008	Planeta DeAgostini
Batman/Superman Sonderbad #6	Artist, Writer, Inker	2009	DC Deutschland
DC Universe: Origins "The Origin of the Metal Man"	Artist, Inker	2009	DC Comics
"The Creeper in What Creeps out the Creeper" DC Universe Halloween Special	Artist, Inker, Colorist, Writer	2009	DC Comics
The Great Unknown	Artist, Inker, Colorist, Cover Artist, Writer	2009	Image Comics
Monsters & Dames (Art Book Series)	Artist	2009	Brandstudio Press
Superman: Ending Battle	Artist	2009	DC Comics
X-Men: Future History - The Messiah War Sourcebook	Artist	2009	Marvel Comics
DC Comics Presents: Superman #4 "O, Captain, My Captain"	Artist	2010	DC Comics
Image Comics 2010 San Diego Comic-Con Yearbook "The Great Unknown"	Artist, Inker, Colorist,	2010	Image Comics
Wolverine & The X-Men	Artist, Inker	2011	Marvel Comics
Elephantmen: Man and Elephantman #1	Cover Artist	2011	Image Comics
The Milkman Murders "The Milkman Murders"	Cover Artist	2012	Image Comics
Wolverine #2 "Bienvenue chez les X-Men! Et à Mort"	Artist, Inker	2012	Marvel France
Wolverine und die #2 X-Men "Willkommen bei den X-Men! Jetzt Sterbt! Teil 3"	Artist, Inker	2012	Marvel Deutschland
Elephantmen: Mammoth Book Vol. 3	Artist	2014	Image Comics
Empereur Joker	Artist	2014	Urban Comics
Président Lex Luthor	Artist	2014	Urban Comics
Wolverine Epic Collection Vol. 8 "The Dying Game"	Artist	2014	Epic Comics/Marvel Comics
The Multiversity: Ultra Comics #1 "Ultra Comics Lives!"	Cover Artist	2015	DC Comics
Multiversity "Die Multiversum-Illustratoren"	Artist, Inker	2015	DC Deutschland
The Multiversity: Guidebook #1 "Maps and Legends"	Artist, Inker, Colorist	2015	DC Comics
The Multiversity: The Delux Edition "Multiversity Guidebook Earth 44"	Artist, Inker, Colorist	2015	DC Comics
The Mike Wieringo Tellos Tribute HC Vol. 2	Artist, Inker	2017	Plays Well with Otters
Superman: President Luthor	Artist	2018	DC Comics
Venom: Along Came a Spider...	Artist	2018	Marvel Comics
