= Charlotte Fullerton =

American writer

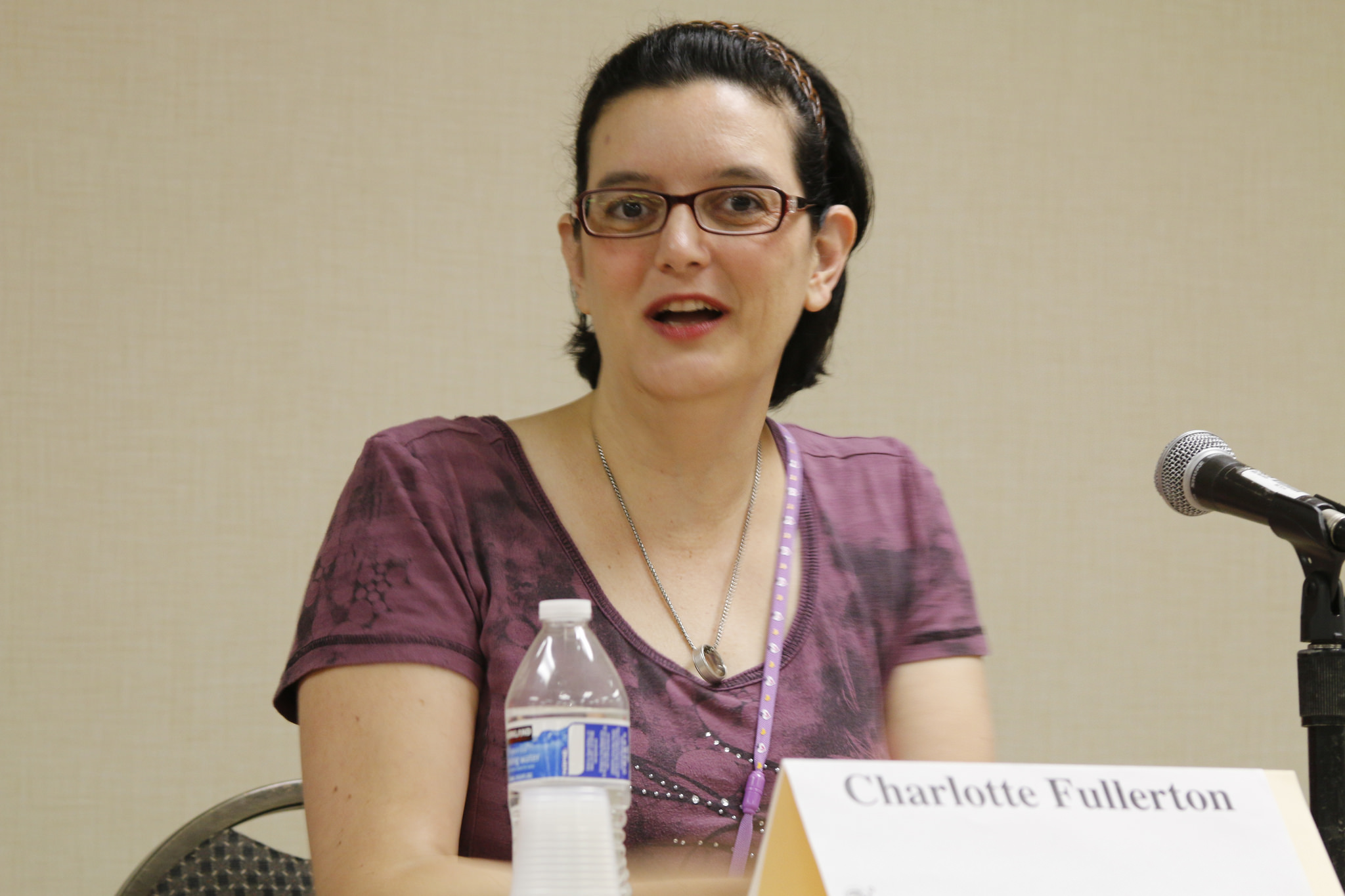
- Charlotte Fullerton McDuffie at the 2016 CONvergence convention
- Born: Charlotte Louise Fullerton; March 20, 1949 (age 77); Salem, Massachusetts, U.S.
- Education: University of Southern California (BA)
- Occupation: Writer
- Known for: Ben 10; My Little Pony: Friendship Is Magic; The Fairly OddParents; Kim Possible
- Spouse: Dwayne McDuffie (m. 2009; died 2011)

Charlotte Louise McDuffie (née Fullerton; born March 20, 1949) is an American writer of television, novels, comic books, and video games.

== Early personal life ==
Fullerton was born in Salem, Massachusetts, and grew up in Bradford and Haverhill, Massachusetts, before moving to Los Angeles, California, to attend the University of Southern California School of Cinema-Television.

Her parents are Alan and Lois Anna (Sapareto) Fullerton. She attended Merrimack Montessori School in Haverhill, The Pike School in Andover, Massachusetts, Sacred Hearts School in Bradford, and St. Mary High School in Lawrence, Massachusetts.

Fullerton was married to comic book and animation writer and producer Dwayne McDuffie from 2009 until his death in 2011.

== Professional life ==
Fullerton is a writer for children's television, serving as co-story editor for Ben 10: Omniverse and story editor for series including Zevo-3, Duel Masters, Sonic Prime, PAW Patrol: Rocky's Garage, and PAW Patrol: Skye's Music Party.

She has written episodes for numerous series, including My Little Pony: Friendship Is Magic, for which she collaborated with writer Kevin Rubio and co-wrote the song "Find a Pet Song", The Fairly OddParents, Ben 10: Alien Force, Ben 10: Ultimate Alien, and Ben 10: Omniverse.

She was also a staff writer on CoComelon and several of its spin-off series from 2020 to 2022, as well as on My Magic Pet Morphle.

Fullerton is a two-time Daytime Emmy nominee. In 2012, she was nominated for Outstanding Original Song, Children's and Animation for My Little Pony: Friendship Is Magic. In 2010, she was nominated for Outstanding Writing in Animation for The Fairly OddParents.

She has authored several books, including Cry of the Wolf (2001) in the Avalon: Web of Magic series for Scholastic, published under the series pseudonym "Rachel Roberts".

Fullerton also wrote four books adapting the Sonic X television series for Penguin Young Readers Group: Aqua Planet, Battle at Ice Palace, Desperately Seeking Sonic, and Dr. Eggman Goes to War (2006 to 2007).

She also wrote comic book stories for the Ben 10: Alien Force segment of DC Comics' Cartoon Network Action Pack series, including issues #28, #31, #33, #35, and #37.

She has written for adult audiences as a contributing editor for the pop culture magazine Geek Monthly and as a featured essayist in the BenBella and Smart Pop essay collection Coffee at Luke's: An Unauthorized Gilmore Girls Gabfest (2007), which examines the television series Gilmore Girls.

She also wrote the backup story "Zapped & the Mother of Invention" in Damage Control #1 for Marvel Comics.

Fullerton contributed to DC Comics' Green Lantern 80th Anniversary 100-Page Super Spectacular.

Fullerton served as a voice director, post-production supervisor, and Foley artist on the short film Troops, a parody of Cops set in the Star Wars universe. In a 2010 ranking reported by Collider, Troops was placed first among Time's selection of Star Wars fan films.

== Dwayne McDuffie Award for Diversity in Comics ==
Following her husband's death, Fullerton originated the idea for an annual comic book award in his honor and, with assistance from writer Neo Edmund, helped establish the Dwayne McDuffie Award for Diversity in Comics, first presented in 2015 at Long Beach Comic Expo.

The award was presented in association with Long Beach Comic Expo during its earlier years, and its 10th anniversary presentation in 2025 took place at San Diego Comic-Con International.

Writer Will J. Watkins serves as director of the Dwayne McDuffie Award for Diversity in Comics, while actor Phil LaMarr has had a recurring role as host and master of ceremonies.

Fullerton, credited as Charlotte (Fullerton) McDuffie, has remained involved with the award since its establishment and continues to participate in its presentation.

== Screenwriting credits ==
=== Television ===
- Mighty Morphin Power Rangers (1995)
- Power Rangers Zeo (1996)
- Angela Anaconda (1999)
- Digimon Adventure 02 (2000)
- Firehouse Tales (2005)
- Tutenstein (2006)
- Kim Possible (2007)
- George of the Jungle (2007)
- Care Bears: Adventures in Care-a-Lot (2008)
- Ben 10: Alien Force (2008–2010)
- Angel Wars (2009)
- Storm Hawks (2009)
- The Super Hero Squad Show (2009–2011)
- The Fairly OddParents (2010)
- Ben 10: Ultimate Alien (2010–2012)
- My Little Pony: Friendship Is Magic (2010–2013)
- Generator Rex (2011)
- Ben 10: Omniverse (2012–2014)
- Green Lantern: The Animated Series (2013)
- Avengers Assemble (2015)
- Thunderbirds Are Go (2015)
- Geronimo Stilton (2017)
- Dorothy and the Wizard of Oz (2017)
- Hello Kitty and Friends: Super Cute Adventures (2020–2025)
- CoComelon and spin-off series (2020–2022)
- Young Justice (2022)
- SuperKitties (2023)
- Sonic Prime (2023)
- My Magic Pet Morphle (2023–2024)
- PAW Patrol: Rocky's Garage (2024)
- PAW Patrol: Skye's Music Party (2024)

=== Film ===
- Care Bears: To the Rescue (2010)
- Barbie & Chelsea: The Lost Birthday (2021)

=== Video games ===
- Ben 10: Alien Force – Vilgax Attacks (2009), Cartoon Network Interactive and D3 Publisher
- Ben 10: Alien Force – The Rise of Hex (2010), Cartoon Network Interactive and Konami
- Ben 10 Ultimate Alien: Cosmic Destruction (2010), Cartoon Network Interactive and D3 Publisher
- Ben 10: Ultimate Alien – Galactic Racing (2011), Cartoon Network Interactive and D3 Publisher
- Ben 10: Ultimate Alien – Mind Mine, Cartoon Network Interactive and V-Tech MobiGo
- Ben 10: Ultimate Alien, Cartoon Network Interactive and LeapFrog Leapster Explorer
- Generator Rex: Agent of Providence (2011), Cartoon Network Interactive and Activision
- Ben 10: Omniverse (2012), Cartoon Network Interactive and D3 Publisher
- Ben 10: Omniverse 2 (2013), Cartoon Network Interactive and D3 Publisher

== Comic books ==
- Cartoon Network Action Pack #28, "Bad Boy" (2008)
- Cartoon Network Action Pack #31, "A Blast from the Past" (2008)
- Cartoon Network Action Pack #33 (2008)
- Cartoon Network Action Pack #35, "Double Trouble" (2009)
- Cartoon Network Action Pack #37, "Ship Shape" (2009)
- Damage Control #1, "Zapped & the Mother of Invention" (2022)
- Green Lantern 80th Anniversary 100-Page Super Spectacular (2020)

== Books ==
- Cry of the Wolf (Avalon: Web of Magic, Book 3), Scholastic (2001)
- Aqua Planet (Sonic X), Penguin/Grosset & Dunlap (2006)
- Battle at Ice Palace (Sonic X), Penguin/Grosset & Dunlap (2006)
- Dr. Eggman Goes to War (Sonic X), Penguin/Grosset & Dunlap (2006)
- Desperately Seeking Sonic (Sonic X), Penguin/Grosset & Dunlap (2007)
- Coffee at Luke's: An Unauthorized Gilmore Girls Gabfest, BenBella/Smart Pop (2007)
