= Vyvan Pham =

American voice actress

- Born: U.S.A.
- Occupation: Voice actress
- Years active: 2003–present
- Website: http://vyvanpham.com

Vyvan Pham is an American voice actress known for her role as Julie Yamamoto on Ben 10: Alien Force, Ben 10: Ultimate Alien, and Ben 10: Omniverse. She also voiced Katana in Batman: The Brave and the Bold.

She has also provided voices for a few video games including X-Men: The Official Game, Spider-Man 3, and others.

== Filmography ==
=== Television ===
Year	Title	Role	Notes
2003	Boston Public	—N/a	Episode: "Chapter Seventy-Six"
2008–2010	Ben 10: Alien Force	Julie Yamamoto, Sandra Tennyson, Ship	11 episodes
2009	Batman: The Brave and the Bold	Katana	Episode: "Enter the Outsiders!"
2009	Dadnapped	Additional voices	Television film
2010–2012	Generator Rex	Cricket	4 episodes
2010–2012	Ben 10: Ultimate Alien	Julie Yamamoto, Ship	14 episodes
2013	Ben 10: Omniverse	Julie Yamamoto, Ship	Episode: "Rules of Engagement"
2019	The Lion Guard	Ullu	7 episodes
2025	Win or Lose	Monica Park	Episode: "Blue"

=== Film ===
Year	Title	Role	Notes
2021	Raya and the Last Dragon	Additional voices	

=== Video games ===
Year	Title	Role
2006	X-Men: The Official Game	Lady Deathstrike
2006	Saints Row	Stilwater's Resident
2007	Spider-Man 3	Arsenic Candy Leader
2007	Kane & Lynch: Dead Men	Yoko Retomoto
2008	The Bourne Conspiracy	Voice
2009	Ben 10 Alien Force: Vilgax Attacks	Ship
2009	Dragon Age: Origins	Orta, Tercy Harrowmont, Dust Town Beggar
2010	Ben 10 Ultimate Alien: Cosmic Destruction	Mrs. Jones
2011	Star Wars: The Old Republic	Alilia, Ashaa, Trea Kobbeth
2012	Guild Wars 2	Valda
