= List of Ben 10 (2005 TV series) episodes =

The following is a list of episodes for the American animated television series Ben 10. The series was created by "Man of Action", a group composed of writers Duncan Rouleau, Joe Casey, Joe Kelly, and Steven T. Seagle. The series was followed by Ben 10: Alien Force.

Ben 10's first episode, "And Then There Were 10", originally aired on Cartoon Network on December 27, 2005, as a sneak peek during Cartoon Network's "Sneak Peek Week" block, airing alongside fellow Cartoon Network original series My Gym Partner's a Monkey, Cartoon Network European co-production Robotboy, and acquired Canadian YTV series Zixx. The series made its official debut on January 13, 2006.

== Series overview ==
Season	Episodes	Originally released	
Season	Episodes	First released	Last released
1	13	December 27, 2005	March 25, 2006
2	13	May 29, 2006	October 9, 2006
3	13	November 25, 2006	April 21, 2007
4	10	July 14, 2007	April 15, 2008

== Episodes ==
=== Season 1 (2005–06) ===
No. overall	No. in season	Title	Directed by	Written by	Original release date	Prod. code	K6–11 rating/share
1	1	"And Then There Were 10"	Scooter Tidwell	Thomas Pugsley	December 27, 2005	640–002	N/A
Ben Tennyson, a 10-year-old boy from the city of Bellwood, begins his cross-country summer vacation with his cousin, Gwen Tennyson, and his grandfather, Max Tennyson. Ben finds a crashed pod at their first stop. Within it is a watch-like alien artifact called the Omnitrix. When he reaches to touch it, the watch latches onto his wrist and refuses to come off, unwillingly merging with his DNA. Ben accidentally discovers that the watch can change his form into various alien creatures and quickly learns how to use it. Deciding that he could be a superhero who can help people, Ben uses the watch to destroy robots sent by warlord Vilgax to retrieve it, thus beginning a summer of adventure for himself, Max, and Gwen. Omnitrix alien debuts: Heatblast, Wildmutt, Diamondhead, XLR8
2	2	"Washington B.C."	Alex Soto	Thomas Pugsley & Greg Klein	January 13, 2006	640–001	N/A
While visiting Washington, D.C., Ben confronts Dr. Animo, a disgruntled scientist whose Transmodulator can mutate living animals and even resurrect dead ones, and eventually learns a lesson about what being a hero truly means. Omnitrix alien debuts: Grey Matter, Four Arms, Stinkfly
3	3	"The Krakken"	Scooter Tidwell	Joe Kelly & Steven T. Seagle	January 14, 2006	640–003	N/A
Ben has an encounter with a lake monster called the Krakken while swimming in a lake. A part of the summer vacation involves a fishing trip, where they charter Captain Shaw's boat. However, Shaw has seen the Krakken many times before and is obsessed with catching it. With Gwen's help, Ben soon discovers that the creature is upset because Jonah Melville, a poacher disguised as an animal lover, is stealing the creature's eggs. After Ben retrieves the eggs, the Krakken is shown cuddling her regained eggs in her nest. Omnitrix alien debuts: Ripjaws
4	4	"Permanent Retirement"	Scooter Tidwell	Marsha Griffin	January 21, 2006	640–004	3.2/13
Ben, Gwen, and Max go to a retirement community to visit Ben and Gwen's aunt Vera, but they find out that evil shapeshifting aliens called the Limax are kidnapping the residents to eat them later and taking their form to replace them. Omnitrix alien debuts: Upgrade, Ghostfreak
5	5	"Hunted"	Scooter Tidwell	Adam Beechen	January 28, 2006	640–005	3.8/16
After Ben passes an obstacle course set up in the desert by Max, the Rustbucket breaks down outside the ghost town of Slatterville, New Mexico. Meanwhile, Vilgax hires three bounty hunters — Kraab, SixSix, and Tetrax Shard — to retrieve the Omnitrix. Ben fights Tetrax, who reveals himself as a Petrosapien (Diamondhead's species). Tetrax criticizes his lack of strategy in hand-to-hand combat, then aids Ben in warding off Kraab and SixSix. Realizing that Ben took his words to heart, Tetrax decides to leave him with the Omnitrix and awards him with a hoverboard.
6	6	"Tourist Trap"	Scooter Tidwell	Joe Kelly & Steven T. Seagle	February 4, 2006	640–008	4.0/15
While in a tourist trap town called Sparksville, Ben plays a practical joke that accidentally unleashes several small electric creatures called Megawhatts. Ben must stop them from multiplying out of control and destroying the town, and eventually defeats them by sealing them inside a large fishbowl.
7	7	"Kevin 11"	Scooter Tidwell	Greg Klein	February 11, 2006	640–007	3.3/13
Straying from Max after an argument for sneaking into the new Sumo Slammer game at a hotel in New York City, Ben meets and befriends Kevin Levin, an 11-year-old juvenile delinquent who can absorb energy. Their first misadventure forces Ben to reveal what the Omnitrix is capable of. Kevin suggests that they team up, but he just wants the Omnitrix's power to take revenge on those who treated him like a monster. The two fight and Ben chases Kevin off, but Kevin has absorbed some of the Omnitrix's energy.
8	8	"The Alliance"	Scooter Tidwell	Kevin Hopps	February 18, 2006	640–009	3.1/12
While visiting Albuquerque, Four Arms reluctantly fights a female thief named Rojo, who injures Max. Ben realizes that the Omnitrix makes him a constant target and puts Gwen and Max in danger, but when he encounters Rojo again, this time telepathically controlled by Vilgax's robots, Max's advice helps Ben win. Vilgax makes telepathic contact with Ben during the battle and threatens him, claiming that he will obtain the Omnitrix some day and will kill him along with the Earth.
9	9	"Last Laugh"	Scooter Tidwell	Joe Casey & Duncan Rouleau	February 25, 2006	640–006	N/A
While visiting a travelling circus, Ben fights an evil clown named Zombozo who is draining people's souls through their laughter. Conquering his own fear of clowns, Ben defeats Zombozo by terrifying him as Ghostfreak and saves his family.
10	10	"Lucky Girl"	Scooter Tidwell	Marsha Griffin	March 4, 2006	640–010	4.6/17
While visiting New Orleans, Ben prevents a powerful sorcerer named Hex from stealing the Arkamada Book of Spells. During the fight, Ben obtains one of Hex's five magical Charms of Bezel and gives it to Gwen, giving her the ability to manipulate luck. Using a Mardi Gras costume, Gwen becomes a superheroine named "Lucky Girl" and steals Ben's spotlight. Hex lures Gwen into a trap to retrieve the charm and destroy New Orleans, but Gwen smashes the Charms to prevent them from being used for evil.
11	11	"A Small Problem"	Scooter Tidwell	Sean Jara	March 11, 2006	640–011	4.0/16
After changing into Grey Matter to sneak onto a water slide, the Omnitrix malfunctions, keeping Ben as Grey Matter longer than normal. During this time, he is captured by Howell Wayneright, an alien-obsessed nerd whom then gets himself and Grey Matter captured by a secret society of knights known as the Forever Knights. The two work together to escape and discover a room filled with extraterrestrial technology, with which the Forever Knights could take over the world. Grey Matter causes three of the objects to trigger an explosion and destroy the Forever Knight's base. Enoch, the Forever Knight's leader, orders his men to find information on the Tennysons.
12	12	"Side Effects"	Scooter Tidwell	Greg Klein	March 18, 2006	640–012	3.1/13
Clancy, a man who can control insects, wants to take revenge on Councilwoman Liang because she wants to tear down the building where he and his insects live. Meanwhile, Ben has to deal with the strange side effects a cold has on his alien forms: Wildmutt is unable to see or smell, Four Arms smells horrible, and Heatblast's fire powers change to cryokinetic powers, which Ben uses to defeat Clancy.
13	13	"Secrets"	Scooter Tidwell	Marty Isenberg	March 25, 2006	640–013	4.0/16
With his wounds finally healed, Vilgax decides to personally retrieve the Omnitrix. He contacts Ben in a dream, which worries Max. Ben ignores Max's warnings not to use the Omnitrix and flies off to Rapid City, where Vilgax captures Ben and brings him aboard his spaceship. Max retrieves weapons from a secret base in Mount Rushmore, and he and Gwen free Ben, but are then held hostage. Max reveals that he activated the ship's self-destruct, and the three escape, leaving Vilgax on the ship as it explodes.

=== Season 2 (2006) ===
No. overall	No. in season	Title	Directed by	Written by	Original release date	Prod. code
14	1	"Truth"	Scooter Tidwell	Marty Isenberg	May 29, 2006	640–014
Shortly after the events of "Secrets", Max tells Ben and Gwen about his secret past; he was a deputized agent of the Plumbers, a secret government organization that dealt with extraterrestrial phenomenon, which was disbanded after Max defeated Vilgax himself for the first time. They run into Max's old partner, Phil Billings, who is still hunting aliens, though he is now a freelance agent. The frequency of the alien attacks and the familiar aliens raises Max's suspicions, and he heads to Mount Rushmore, where he finds the Null Void Projector — a weapon that can trap others in an alternate dimension — has gone missing. Phil has been abusing it to scam various hotel owners into paying him to remove the aliens that he sets free.
15	2	"The Big Tick"	Sebastian Montes	Kevin Hopps	May 30, 2006	640–015
While visiting Yellowstone National Park, Ben discovers the eleventh alien on the Omnitrix, Cannonbolt. At the same time, a meteor crashes nearby, unleashing a giant tick-like alien called the "Great One" that intends to devour Earth. The Great One turns out to be impervious to Ben's original ten aliens, but Ben quickly discovers that Cannonbolt is impervious from any attack when rolled into an armored ball and penetrates the Great One's armor in that form, killing the alien from the inside. Omnitrix alien debuts: Cannonbolt
16	3	"Framed"	Sebastian O. Montes III	Thomas Pugsley	May 31, 2006	640–016
While visiting San Francisco, the Tennysons discover that doppelgangers of Ben's aliens are committing crimes around the city. Ben encounters the imposter and discovers that it was really Kevin; their last battle has given Kevin the ability to transform into the various aliens of the Omnitrix. Kevin leaves Ben to pay for his own crimes performed as Omnitrix aliens, bringing Ben into direct conflict with the cold and calculating Lt. Steel of the government's Special Alien Capture Team (SACT). Four Arms and Steel confront Kevin atop the Golden Gate Bridge, where Kevin's rage causes him to transform into a hybrid of all of the Omnitrix aliens without the ability to revert to human form.
17	4	"Gwen 10" (Note: This is non-canon as it takes place in an alternate universe or timeline.)	Scooter Tidwell	Greg Klein	June 1, 2006	640–017
When Ben wakes up one morning, he finds the Omnitrix missing from his arm and Gwen and Max have no idea what he's talking about when he asks about it. Ben soon discovers that he is reliving the day he found the Omnitrix, but in an parallel reality. At the campsite, Ben tries to find the Omnitrix as it crashes to Earth, only to find out that Gwen has already found it. Gwen quickly adjusts to the Omnitrix's powers, but uses the Omnitrix much more than required and when Vilgax attacks, she finds the Omnitrix is discharged and will take some time before it becomes usable. She is captured, but is saved by Ben and Max. The Omnitrix detaches from Gwen and attaches to Max, who escapes the ship with Ben and Gwen and finishes Vilgax off.
18	5	"Grudge Match"	Sebastian O. Montes III	Marty Isenberg	June 7, 2006	640–018
While Diamondhead battles Kevin, who had rendered Gwen and Max unconscious, a teleportation beam takes Diamondhead and Kevin to a ship called the Megacruiser, where gladiator matches are regularly held between alien slaves. Slix Vigma, the ship's droid captain, makes Ben and Kevin a team, bonding them with shackles that transfer pain from one to the other, so they battle another captive, Technorg. After the fight, Kevin traps Ben with the intent to kill, revealing that he still bears a grudge, but Ben transforms into Cannonbolt and knocks him out. Technorg abides by a code of honor and saves Ben, sending him back to Earth, while Kevin is left aboard the Megacruiser with Technorg.
19	6	"The Galactic Enforcers"	Scooter Tidwell	Joe Kelly	June 13, 2006	640–019
When SixSix and his new partner Vulkanus arrive in Pittsburgh in search of raw minerals to build a devastating bomb, Ben joins a group of alien super heroes, the Galactic Enforcers, to stop them. However, all is not well with the new group, as a small gift of Ben's chocolate weakens the group's leader, Ultimos, which causes his second, Synaptak, to take the lead in order to try showing Ben up. However, the Enforcers' tactics involving 'commanding presence' backfire on them, and nearly getting group member Tini hurt in the process. However, after Ben goads Synaptak into rescuing Tini from a landslide, Ben and the Enforcers put aside their differences to arrest the bounty hunters.
20	7	"Camp Fear"	Sebastian O. Montes III	Marty Isenberg	June 21, 2006	640–022
Distracted by Ben and Gwen quarreling, Max almost hits a young camper named Gilbert on the road. They take the boy back to his camp, Camp Opinicon, only to find no one there. As they investigate the premises, they find two more children, twins named Andy and Mandy, who are hiding from something that caused the camp to become deserted. Max is captured by tendrils while he investigates, prompting Ben and Gwen to split up. While Gwen leads the campers to safety from fungal mutants, Ben attempts two failed rescue missions, getting captured on the second. In trying to escape, Ben unlocks a new alien form, Wildvine. Omnitrix alien debuts: Wildvine
21	8	"Ultimate Weapon"	Scooter Tidwell	Jeff Hare	July 6, 2006	640–021
Max's Plumber equipment detects that an ancient mask had been unearthed in Texas. This quickly triggers a change in Max's attitude; he claims that this artifact would lead to the most powerful weapon ever designed, and that he should retrieve it before it falls into the wrong hands. Max immediately becomes more impatient, worse-tempered, and far stricter. Upon retrieving the mask, the Tennysons come into conflict with the Forever Knights, who want to find the weapon themselves. The Tennysons end up with the mask after a struggle and use it to find the Sword of Ek Chuah, inside of a Mayan pyramid.
22	9	"Tough Luck"	Scooter Tidwell	Steven T. Seagle	July 12, 2006	640–023
Gwen dons her Lucky Girl costume again upon finding the mystical Keystone of Bezel at a magic convention in Las Vegas. Rather than good luck, the Keystone strengthens all of Gwen's natural abilities to superhuman levels and grants her superhuman agility, enhanced reflexes, and durability. At the same time, Hex is busted out of prison by his niece Charmcaster, and seeks to use the keystone to restore the destroyed charms.
23	10	"They Lurk Below"	Sebastian O. Montes III	Thomas Pugsley & Greg Klein	July 18, 2006	640–024
The family ride a jet belonging to Max's old friend, Donovan Grand Smith, who owns an underwater resort in the Bermuda Triangle. At the entrance, they receive a warm welcome from Donovan himself, but also meet his grandson, Eddie, who does not seem to be excited about their guests. When Eddie, Ben, and Gwen enter the Undersea Manta Ray, a giant submarine, they encounter strange aliens that threaten to destroy the whole resort. While the kids find a way to cooperate with each other to find the source, the aliens want to retrieve it as it turns out that it was a piece of their technology.
24	11	"Ghostfreaked Out"	Sebastian O. Montes III	Thomas Pugsley	July 25, 2006	640–020
Ben has been having strange nightmares about Ghostfreak. During a tour of an academy school Gwen wishes to attend, Ben sees and hears Ghostfreak everywhere. When Frightwig, Acid Breath, and Thumbskull show up, Ben activates his Omnitrix; however, it transforms him into Ghostfreak. After a vicious battle, Ghostfreak escapes from the Omnitrix. Ghostfreak removes his second layer of skin, revealing himself to be Zs'Skayr. Zs'Skayr scares the circus trio into working for him as he schemes to possess Ben and gain control of the Omnitrix.
25	12	"Dr. Animo and the Mutant Ray"	Scooter Tidwell	Duncan Rouleau	August 26, 2006	640–025
When Ben tries to dismantle the Omnitrix to see how it works, he ends up breaking off its faceplate, causing him to transform into hybrids of his alien forms. Meanwhile, Dr. Animo escapes from prison and, during a battle with Ben, finds the broken piece of the Omnitrix. Using it, he is able to complete his large-scale Transmodulator, giving him the power to mutate the entire planet in a single shot. Omnitrix alien debuts: Diamond Matter, Heat Jaws, Stink Arms.
26	13	"Back with a Vengeance"	Sebastian O. Montes III	Marty Isenberg	October 9, 2006	640–026
While visiting Niagara Falls, Ben accidentally unlocks the "Master Control" feature of the Omnitrix, allowing him to become an alien just by thinking about it at will. Elsewhere, Kevin has assumed control of the Megacruiser, and he locates and revives Vilgax, who realizes the nature of Kevin's mutation and decides that he may be of use. Kevin and Vilgax locate Ben and fight until Max attempts to trap the enemies in the Null Void dimension; however, Ben gets pulled in as well and ends up continuing his battle in another realm, so Gwen enters the Null Void in order to retrieve Ben.

=== Season 3 (2006–07) ===
No. overall	No. in season	Title	Directed by	Written by	Original release date	Prod. code	K6–11 rating/share
27	1	"Ben 10,000"	Sebastian O. Montes III	Greg Weisman	November 25, 2006	669–002	2.6/12
As Ben and Gwen are planning Max's birthday on the shore of Horse Thief Lake, a mysterious stranger appears and kidnaps Gwen, so Ben follows her into a strange portal. When the dust settles, Ben realizes that he is twenty years in the future, where humans and aliens live peacefully. Ben then learns that Gwen's captor is her future self, who has become a master sorceress. Gwendolyn reveals that the future Ben, called Ben 10,000, is now a world-renowned hero with ten thousand different alien forms at his disposal. But, upon meeting his future self, Ben realizes that the future Ben is all business and just can't relax and have fun, not even for his own family. Omnitrix alien debuts: (by Ben 10,000) Spitter, Buzzshock, Arctiguana
28	2	"Midnight Madness"	Scooter Tidwell	Marty Isenberg	December 2, 2006	669–001	2.1/9
While visiting the Mega-mall-opolis in Bloomington, Minnesota, Ben and Gwen watch a hypnotist named Sublimino perform. Gwen volunteers Ben as a test subject, and Sublimino successfully hypnotizes him. When asked to act like an alien, Ben naturally turns to the Omnitrix and almost changes in front of the audience. Even though he is stopped by Gwen, the trouble doesn't end there. Sublimino is able to use those he hypnotizes to commit crimes in their dream state, and Ben proves to be the perfect accomplice.
29	3	"A Change of Face"	Scooter Tidwell	Thomas Pugsley & Greg Klein	December 9, 2006	669–003	3.1/12
During a visit to Salem, Massachusetts, Charmcaster attacks in an attempt to magically switch bodies with Ben to attain the great powers of the Omnitrix, but Gwen interferes, causing Charmcaster to switch with her instead. Gwen is punched out by Charmcaster before she can explain anything, and is then arrested and sent to juvie. Charmcaster stays with Ben and Max and tries to cook up another body-transference spell but Gwen escapes from juvie and returns, convincing Ben of the truth before Charmcaster tries again. However, Charmcaster manages to swap their bodies once more, ending with Charmcaster in her true body while Gwen and Ben have switched.
30	4	"Merry Christmas"	Sebastian O. Montes III	Duncan Rouleau	December 11, 2006	669–004	N/A
The Tennysons come upon a bizarre Christmas village in Death Valley, run by a Christmas-obsessed man named Mr. Jingles, who thinks Max is Santa Claus and proceeds to kidnap him. As Ben and Gwen explore, they learn about a strange curse on the village which froze it in time at Christmas in the 1930s and transformed its residents into elves. But when Ben delivers all the gifts that had been made, the curse is reversed, and time catches up to the village instantly.
31	5	"Benwolf"	Alex Soto	James Phillips	February 17, 2007	669–005	2.7/7
During a visit to a Navajo village owned by Max's old Plumber partner Wes Green in Chinle, Arizona, Ben falls in love with Wes' granddaughter Kai while a werewolf-like creature appears in a flash of purple lightning. Wes believes it to be a Yenaldooshi, or Navajo werewolf. It stole and ripped the receiver. Wildvine fights the creature, but it bites Wildvine's root just before Ben returns to normal. It nearly kills Ben, but he is spared when the werewolf accidentally scratches the Omnitrix rather than Ben himself. Afterwards, Ben begins transforming into a werewolf himself, presumably an effect of the bite. However, the group discover that the werewolf is an alien and added its DNA to the Omnitrix by scratching it, thus gradually transforming Ben into Blitzwolfer. Omnitrix alien debuts: Blitzwolfer (Note: Until Ben 10: Omniverse, the alien was known as Benwolf.)
32	6	"Game Over"	Scooter Tidwell	Marty Isenberg	February 24, 2007	669–006	3.7/16
Ben and Gwen are playing the Sumo Slammer video game and Gwen is beating Ben at it. Ben turns into Upgrade and merges with the computer so he can lower Gwen's score. As Gwen tries to get Ben out, lightning hits the van and zaps them both into the game. They realize that all of the aliens in the Omnitrix are unavailable and they have to collect tokens to activate certain ones. They progress through the levels to get the Upgrade token and allow them to leave the game, but the villain of the game hears them and wants to use the Upgrade token to leave the game and take over the real world.
33	7	"Super Alien Hero Buddy Adventures"	Scooter Tidwell	Marty Isenberg	March 3, 2007	669–008	3.5/14
When a television show called Super Alien Hero Buddy Adventures shows up, Ben gets angry and demands credit since it stars cartoon versions of Four Arms, Heatblast, and Wildmutt. Furthermore, it has replaced his favorite show, Kangaroo Commando. It just so happens Ben and Gwen are visiting Planetary Studios in Hollywood at the time, so he tries to confront the producer about it. Meanwhile, strange accidents begin occurring around the actor who plays The Commando, allowing the actor to save the day. The Commando suspects that the artist producing the cartoon, Tim Dean, is responsible, but Gwen suspects foul play on the Commando's part.
34	8	"Under Wraps"	Sebastian O. Montes III	Greg Weisman	March 10, 2007	669–009	2.6/12
To teach Ben and Gwen the value of hard work, Max takes them to a family farm owned farmer Joan Maplewood in Dairyville, South Carolina. During dinner there, Joan's son Todd tells Ben and Gwen of a mysterious alien mummy that had recently arrived in a flash of purple lightning that sparks their curiosity. The two of them find it digging for a strange stone, but it attacks them as soon as they see it. XLR8 fights it to no avail, but the mummy flees in the confusion. Max discovers that the strange rock is a mineral called "Corrodium," which causes severe mutations in earthly organisms.
35	9	"The Unnaturals"	Scooter Tidwell	Marty Isenberg	March 17, 2007	669–010	N/A
Ben goes to see his favorite Little League team play in Philadelphia. Unfortunately, Cash and JT are on his team, and he discovers that their opponents, the Squires, are robots. He cheats for his own team, but it works against them when the robots try to kidnap people on the team who appeared to be experts due to Ben's help. While attempting a rescue, Ben discovers that the robots plans are to replace the President of the United States, who had also been watching the game. After the Tennysons save the President and leave, Enoch appears, revealing the plan to be his own. He vows that the Tennysons will pay with their lives.
36	10	"Monster Weather"	Sebastian O. Montes III	Thomas Pugsley & Greg Klein	March 24, 2007	669–007	3.3/16
Max takes Gwen and Ben to a music festival in Chicago to see his favorite old time band, Shag Carpeting, but the event is interrupted by a weather-controlling robot called S.A.M.
37	11	"The Return"	Scooter Tidwell	Thomas Pugsley & Greg Klein	April 7, 2007	669–012	2.6/11
A shuttle launch at NASA is interrupted by a purple lightning storm, which attracts the attention of the Tennysons, who hope to discover the origin of the aliens werewolf and mummy. While at NASA, Ben runs into an ill-tempered scientist named Dr. Viktor. Surveillance tapes associate him with the purple lightning storm, and he is quickly shown to be in cahoots with the two creatures. The Tennysons encounter the creatures again, in addition to Doctor Viktor; following a losing battle, they split up: Max and Gwen board the space shuttle that Viktor launches, and Ben as XLR8 follows Viktor, who revives his master, who much to Ben's horror is revealed to be Zs'Skayr, Ghostfreak's. Omnitrix alien debuts: Snare-oh (Note: Until Ben 10: Omniverse, the alien was known as Benmummy.)
38	12	"Be Afraid of the Dark"	Sebastian O. Montes III	Marty Isenberg	April 14, 2007	669–013	2.4/10
Ben transforms into Grey Matter to escape from Zs'Skayr and Viktor. He is able to discern Zs'Skayr's plan from a computer terminal: using the corrodium to amplify the power source of the orbiting space station, in conjunction with the device the alien werewolf built in New Mexico, Zs'Skayr is intent on covering the daylight side of the Earth in a corrodium shield. This will not only mutate Earth's population, but it will also block out the sun, giving Zs'Skayr a world of eternal darkness to rule over. Ben uses Upgrade to create a makeshift rocket to get to the space station, which Viktor clings to so that he might also get to the station, while Max and Gwen fight the mummy aboard the space center and attempt to thwart Zs'Skayr's plan from there. Omnitrix alien debuts: Frankenstrike (Note: Until Ben 10: Omniverse, the alien was known as Benvicktor.)
39	13	"The Visitor"	Alex Soto	Thomas Pugsley & Greg Klein	April 21, 2007	669–011	3.3/15
During a trip to St. Louis, Ben and Gwen meet a female alien named Xylene, who locates the Omnitrix and confronts Ben under the impression that he had stolen it. But when Max comes to defend them, he and Xylene recognize each other as old comrades and sweethearts. The two reminisce later that night, and Xylene reveals that she was the commander of the ship bringing the Omnitrix to Earth when Vilgax attacked it, and that she had intended to send it to Max for safekeeping; Ben received the Omnitrix by mistake. But when one of Vilgax's remaining drones attacks and captures Max, Ben and Xylene reluctantly team up to save him, with Xylene unlocking Upchuck in order to defeat the drone. Omnitrix alien debuts: Upchuck

=== Season 4 (2007–08) ===
No. overall	No. in season	Title	Directed by	Written by	Original release date	Prod. code	K6–11 rating/share
40	1	"Perfect Day"	Scooter Tidwell	Michael Jelenic	July 14, 2007	669–017	N/A
Ben seems to be having a perfect day, but eventually discovers that Enoch and the Forever Knights have trapped him in a dream world while they attempt to remove the Omnitrix from his wrist. Enoch then turns the dream into a nightmare, but Ben manages to take control of the dream and escape, trapping Enoch in his own dream world. Once the Tennysons leave, another Forever Knight, the "Forever King", decides to leave Enoch in the machine as punishment for his past failures.
41	2	"Divided We Stand"	Scooter Tidwell	Marty Isenberg	July 19, 2007	669–018	N/A
Dr. Animo has escaped from prison with the help of a mutated seagull, plotting to get revenge on Ben, who is at the beach with Gwen and Max. Ben is being impulsive as no one will play with him, until he is confronted by Animo's seagull. During the fight, Ben discovers a new alien on the Omnitrix, Ditto, who has the power to multiply at will. Ben manages to drive off the seagull and enjoys playing as his multiple Ditto copies. However, one of Ben's Ditto clones is captured by Animo himself in hopes of exploiting his alien DNA for his own evil purposes, using it to create an army of self-replicating Stinkflies. Ditto, Gwen and Max manage to defeat Animo's army by exploting their weakness of all sharing the same pain. Omnitrix alien debuts: Ditto
42	3	"Don't Drink the Water"	Scooter Tidwell	Marty Isenberg, Greg Klein, and Thomas Pugsley	July 26, 2007	669–019	N/A
Growing weaker with old age, Hex is seeking out something to make him stay young. At the same time, Max is having difficulties with his aging body, so he decides to impress his grandchildren at a fair to show them he's not as elderly as he seems. At the dunking game Max challenged them to, he and Ben both get splashed, unaware that the water is from the Fountain of Youth. Max regresses into a ten-year-old while Ben becomes a four-year-old. Hex manages to force the booth's owner, Hector, into revealing the location of the fountain as he is its guardian, having been charged to do so by Juan Ponce de León four centuries ago. Ben manages to defeat Hex as Heatblast by throwing a tantrum and unleashing a massive burst of heat that destroys the fountain and ends up causing Hex to be reduced to a child.
43	4	"Big Fat Alien Wedding"	Sebastian O. Montes III	Eugene Son	August 2, 2007	669–020	N/A
Ben, Gwen, and Max attend a family wedding for Max's nephew Joel and his bride-to-be, Camille. Before the day of the wedding, Ben interrupts a mud alien's attempt to sabotage the wedding. Ben defeats the sludge alien as Cannonbolt but finds the groom's parents pointing rifles at him soon after. He escapes with Gwen's help, and Max explains that the groom's side of the family are all Plumbers, while the bride's side are all mud-like aliens, called "Sludgepuppies", which the Plumbers were sworn enemies with until Joel and Camille met and forged a romance, which makes the wedding a truce. On the day of the wedding, Camille's parents, who object the wedding and the truce, go on a rampage and are defeated by the Tennysons and Camille.
44	5	"Ben 4 Good Buddy"	Scooter Tidwell	Amy Wolfram	September 22, 2007	669–021	2.5/10
While traveling through a desert, the Tennysons encounter a group of modern-day pirates called the Road Crew attempting to hijack the deluxe RV of Laurence Wainwright. After stopping the Road Crew, the family makes a pit stop and Ben and Gwen start to complain about how the Rust Bucket doesn't work right and isn't nearly as luxurious as Laurence's RV. Shortly afterwards, the Road Crew returns and steals the Rust Bucket. While Max tries desperately to track down the Rust Bucket, the Road Crew give it a makeover for use in their plans. When the Road Crew tries to use the Rustbucket to destroy a new highway that would deprive them of victims, Ben stops them by using the Rustbucket's quirks to shut it down and return the RV to normal.
45	6	"Ready to Rumble"	Scooter Tidwell	Eugene Son	September 29, 2007	669–022	2.4/10
After damaging Gwen's new laptop, Ben enters a wrestling competition as Four Arms to earn some money to replace it, becoming an instant celebrity. During the tournament, he fights a pair of mutant brothers who owe a mob boss a large sum of money to save their farm. They entered the competition to pay off their debt, which Ben doesn't learn about until after defeating them. After learning the truth, Ben goes with them as Ditto to save their mother, who is being held by the gang as "collateral damage". Ben gives them all the money won in the competition to get back to their home. When he returns to the Rustbucket he gets to know that he hasn't done any damage to Gwen's laptop. Instead Gwen had put a security lock on the laptop to prevent Ben from using it.
46	7	"Ken 10"	Sebastian O. Montes III	Greg Weisman	October 6, 2007	669–023	3.5/15
In the future, Ben's son Kenny is celebrating his tenth birthday. To commemorate the occasion, Ben gives him an Omnitrix of his very own, but grows frustrated by Ben's overprotectiveness. Kenny soon befriends a boy named Devlin. The same night, Ben's old arch-rival Kevin 11 attacks their home looking for the Null Void chamber. Unable to locate the chamber, he retreats. Kenny becomes angry at his father for not telling him or letting him fight Kevin and endeavors to find the chamber with Devlin. When they find it, Devlin mutates into Kevin's mutant form revealing he was the real attacker from the previous night, and activates the chamber, releasing the real Kevin, who is revealed to be Devlin's father and mutates into a new form, Kevin 11,000. When Devlin realizes his father was only using him to escape, he battles him alongside Kenny, who unlocks his Omnitrix's Master Control. When Kevin proves to be too much powerful and injures Kenny, Ben pummels him and sends him back to the Null Void and adopts Devlin into his family.
47	8	"Ben 10 vs. the Negative 10"	Sebastian O. Montes III	Thomas Pugsley and Greg Klein	March 9, 2008	669–025	N/A
48	9	"Ben 10 vs. the Negative 10"	Scooter Tidwell	Thomas Pugsley and Greg Klein	March 9, 2008	669–026	N/A
Part 1: The Tennysons pick up the grandson of another Plumber, Cooper, who is hitching a ride home with them. Meanwhile, a Plumber base within the bullion depository at Fort Knox is robbed by the Circus Freaks and Sublimino. By the time the Tennysons find out, they are too late to help. They soon learn of a second robbery at a Plumber base on the top floors of the Seattle Space Needle, run by Rojo, Animo, Clancy, and Charmcaster. Max discovers they are searching for the keys to the "Sub Energy", an extremely potent sub-atomic power source given to the Plumbers by an alien race. They lose the keys to the villains and attempt to rout them at the Mount Rushmore base, where the Sub Energy is stored. However, they find that the Forever King, joined by a subordinate and the villains that raided the earlier bases, has beaten them to it. Part 2: Ben, Gwen, Max, and Cooper use the Plumbers' Mount Rushmore installation to mount a final stand against the Forever King's forces. Max discovers that the Forever King was once a plumber named Driscoll who was kicked out after hoarding alien technology. Despite their best efforts, they cannot keep Driscoll from obtaining the Sub-Energy. Driscoll uses the sub-energy to tremendously increase his armored suit and battles Ben, who uses Upchuck to digest and destroy the power source. Omnitrix alien debuts: Eye Guy
49	10	"Goodbye and Good Riddance"	Scooter Tidwell	Thomas Pugsley and Greg Klein	April 15, 2008	669–024	N/A
Ben returns home after summer vacation ends and is told by Max that he must keep the Omnitrix a secret. Ben gets the chance to use the Omnitrix when Vilgax attacks, looking to take the device from Ben. All four Tennysons fight off Vilgax's drones running amok in the city. When Vilgax appears again, easily fending off Ben, Ben's father suggests leading him into the underground gas line, which they ignite to incinerate the villain. Ben's secret is revealed to the public during the affair, and Gwen ends up transferring to his school. Just when it seems like everything is normal, Dr. Animo shows up with a group of mutated animals, which Ben and Gwen get ready to fight.

== Shorts ==
No.	Title	Original release date	Prod. code
1	"Hijacked"	July 14, 2007	901–305A
Two men try to carjack the Rustbucket while Grandpa Max is out. Fortunately, Ben is on the Rustbucket and the carjackers end up messing with Four Arms. But Grandpa Max doesn't believe Ben about this.
2	"Snack Break"	February 18, 2008	901–305B
Ben and Gwen want something from the snack machine. When Ben's snack doesn't come out of it, he turned into Grey Matter and goes inside, but he turns back and gets stuck, and Gwen takes his snack.
3	"Survival Skills"	March 10, 2008	901–305C
When Ben unwittingly puts out the campfire needed to roast marshmallows, Ben must start the fire again without using the Omnitrix. But when Max isn't around, Ben ends up using Heatblast and later pays the price.
4	"Radio Dazed"	March 24, 2008	901–305D
Ben and Gwen don't want to listen to Grandpa Max's music. Gwen offers Ben to go Upgrade and change it but Ben breaks the radio. Still everyone ends up with Grandpa Max's favorite music on cassette.
5	"Sleepaway Camper"	April 7, 2008	901–305E
Grandpa Max's snoring is keeping Ben awake. When all else fails, Ben thought to use Grey Matter to go to somewhere silent, but it came out Ripjaws, so he decides to sleep at the bottom of the lake.
6	"Dogged Pursuit"	April 21, 2008	901–305F
When an elderly woman's purse is snatched, Ben gets more than he bargains for when he retrieves it as Wildmutt.
7	"Let the Games Begin"	July 1, 2008	901–305G
Ben and Gwen are playing Roadkill bingo with things that are seen on the road to see who'll sit on the front seat weekly and Ben is losing, so he turns into XLR8 to place things on his card on the road. But with unexpected results, Ben loses and is grounded at the back seat for a month for cheating.
8	"Handle with Care"	July 8, 2008	901–305H
Ben and Gwen are at a museum watching an exhibit of crystal eggs when thieves try to strip it bare. Ben turns into Diamondhead, but even for him it proves hard to fend off the thieves and protect the eggs from breakage.
9	"Road Trip Rumble"	March 12, 2012	N/A
Ben and Gwen's backseat bickering escalates into an all-out brawl between Ben's Omnitrix and Gwen's magic. Ben fights Gwen as Four Arms and Upgrade, eventually destroying their surroundings, upsetting Grandpa Max.

== Films ==
Title	Original release date	Prod. code	Viewers (millions)
Ben 10: Secret of the Omnitrix (Note: This film consists of the first three episodes from the fourth season. It was originally intended to be the series' finale.)	August 10, 2007	669–014	N/A
Ben 10: Secret of the Omnitrix	August 10, 2007	669–015	N/A
Ben 10: Secret of the Omnitrix	August 10, 2007	669–016	N/A
During a battle with Dr. Animo, the Omnitrix is accidentally set to self-destruct. In order to stop it, Ben, Gwen, and Tetrax travel across space to track down the Omnitrix's creator. Three alternate versions of this film have aired, each with a modified opening from the original. Omnitrix alien debuts: Way Big
Ben 10: Race Against Time	November 21, 2007	N/A	3.99
In this live-action film, Ben has to go back to Bellwood's school, but the aliens have a different idea. They are planning to have a massive invasion, led by the mysterious Eon. Omnitrix alien debuts: Eon
Ben 10: Destroy All Aliens	March 23, 2012	N/A	2.08
The Omnitrix starts acting weird after a dismantling spell mixes with it. Meanwhile Ben, Gwen, and Tetrax must deal with a mysterious Upgrade warrior who chases Ben around the world, and an Evil Way Big who apparently killed Azmuth.

== See also ==
- List of Ben 10: Alien Force episodes
- List of Ben 10: Ultimate Alien episodes
- List of Ben 10: Omniverse episodes
- List of Ben 10 (2016–2021) episodes
