= DNAliens =

The DNAliens may refer to:

- DNAlien (comics), genetic creations by Project Cadmus appearing in DC Comics
- The main antagonists from the Cartoon Network original series Ben 10: Alien Force
