= Paul Eiding =

American actor

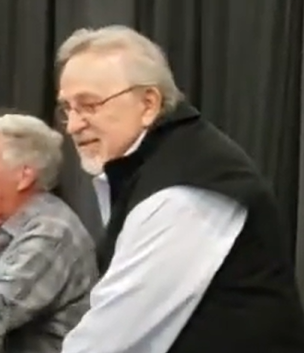
- Eiding at TFcon in 2019
- Born: Cleveland, Ohio, U.S.
- Occupation: Actor
- Years active: 1978–present

Paul Eiding is an American actor, best known for his role of Don Miller in The Charmings and his voice-roles of Colonel Roy Campbell in the Metal Gear series, Perceptor in The Transformers, and Max Tennyson in the Ben 10 franchise.

== Early career ==
Eiding was inspired to become an actor by his experience serving in the United States Army's 3rd Infantry Division in Würzburg, Germany. During this time, he joined a performing group named the Marne Glee Club. Although he was one of the youngest G.I.s in the group, he was soon promoted to a directing position due to his music background. The group performed across Germany, Belgium, Denmark, and northern France for soldiers and civilian audiences.

During the 1970s, Eiding was a prolific commercial actor, appearing in advertisements for snowmobiles, granola bars, department stores, and clothing. He also worked for theater-groups across the Midwest, including Dudley Riggs's Brave New Workshop in Minneapolis. Eiding found the Brave New Workshop's improvisational approach exhausting, elaborating that "You have to take time off to think of new ideas. At Dudley Riggs we were doing nine shows a week". Before coming to Wausau, Wisconsin, Eiding played a small part aside Sylvester Stallone in the Norman Jewison film F.I.S.T., which was shot in Iowa. In Wausau, he led a number of workshops, and was a guest director for its community theater's production of the comedy-mystery What the Butler saw in 1980. He was a director and actor for the Chanhassen Dinner Theater of Minneapolis, portraying Max Detweiler in its 1981 production of The Sound of Music. On February 2, 1981, Eiding hosted the Twin Cities' first award ceremony for distinguished achievement in local theater, which was held at the Children's Theater Company.

In 1983, Eiding starred in a dual role as Joshua and Cathy in Don Amendolia's Los Angeles production of Caryl Churchill's Cloud 9. In the late 1980s, Eiding appeared in the short-lived ABC sitcom The Charmings as the neighbor Don Miller.

== Filmography ==
=== Film ===
- F.I.S.T. (1978)
- The Personals (1982) as David
- Madhouse (1990) as Stark
- American Zombie (2007) as Hank Baker
- The Submarine Kid (2015) as Thunder Lake Mayor

=== Radio ===
- Adventures in Odyssey - Michael Horden
- Adam's Rib (radio adaptation)
- American Appetites (radio adaptation)
- Dinah was (radio adaptation)

=== Live-action ===
Year	Title	Role	Notes	Source
1984	Hunter	Wally Wallerstean	Episode: "A Long Way from L.A."	
1986	Cheers	Fred Anderson	Episode: "Relief Bartender"	
1986	Tales from the Darkside	Rev. Joy	Episode: "Black Widows"	
1987–1988	The Charmings	Don "King of Carpets" Miller	Main role	
1991	Perfect Strangers	Speaker of the Hut	Episode: "Weekend at Ferdinand's"	
1991	Empty Nest	Hartman	Episode: "Sucking Up Is Hard to Do"	
1993	Star Trek: The Next Generation	Ambassador Loquel	Episode: "Liaisons"	
1994	Picket Fences	Jason Steinberg	6 episodes	
1994	ER	Kadalski	Episode: "The Gift"	
1996–1999	The Pretender	Bernie Baxley	2 episodes	
2001	The West Wing	Labor lawyer	Episode: "Ellie"	
2006	CSI: Miami	Judge Porterson	Episode: "Backstabbers"	
2009	My Name Is Earl	Businessman	Episode: "Got the Babysitter Pregnant"	
2021	Money Heist	Minister	Voice, English dub	

=== Animation ===
Year	Title	Role	Notes
1987	Sky Commanders	Raider Rath	2 episodes
1988–1989	Fantastic Max	Arnold Young	6 episodes
1991	Toxic Crusaders	No-Zone	13 episodes
1993	Batman: The Animated Series	Ferris Dolan	Episode: "Robin's Reckoning"
1993	Animaniacs	Miserable Diner	Episode: "Les Miseranimals"
1993–1994	SWAT Kats: The Radical Squadron	Dr. N. Zyme	2 episodes
1995	Daisy-Head Mayzie	Mr. McGrew	Television film
1996	The Real Adventures of Jonny Quest	Bennett	3 episodes
1996	The Tick	Gezundheitan	Episode: "The Tick vs. Education"
1998–1999	Cow and Chicken	Bully, Charles, Patient #1, Patient #3	2 episodes
2004	Evil Con Carne	Buster, Dad, Guy	Episode: "Gridlocked and Loaded/Fool's Paradise"
2005–2008	Ben 10	Max Tennyson, additional voices	49 episodes
2006–2007	Avatar: The Last Airbender	Mai's Father, Dock	2 episodes
2008–2010	Ben 10: Alien Force	Max Tennyson	17 episodes
2010–2011	Ben 10: Ultimate Alien	Max Tennyson	7 episodes
2012–2014	Ben 10: Omniverse	Max Tennyson, Blukic, Eye Guy, Liam, Hoodlum, Ultimate Spidermonkey, Highbreed Bailiff, Zed	51 episodes
2019	Amphibia	Monroe	Episode: "Hop Pop and Lock"
2023	The Loud House	Calvin Coconuts	Episode: "Road Trip: Doll Day Afternoon"

==== Film ====
Voice performances in films
Year	Title	Role	Notes	Source
1986	The Transformers: The Movie	Perceptor		
1991	Adventures in Dinosaur City	King		
1992	Porco Rosso	Additional voices	English dub	
1993	Once Upon a Forest	Abigail's father		
1994	Scooby-Doo! in Arabian Nights	Scribe	Television film	
1994	Tom the Chief Engineer			
1996	The Hunchback of Notre Dame	Frollo's soldiers, additional voices		
1997	Cats Don't Dance	Additional voices		
1998	Quest for Camelot	Additional voices		
1998	Mulan	Ping soldier #2, additional voices		
1998	Pocahontas II: Journey to a New World	Additional voices	Direct-to-video	
1998	Scooby-Doo on Zombie Island	Additional voices	Direct-to-video	
1998	A Bug's Life	Additional voices		
1998	Antz	Ant worker, additional voices		
1998	The Prince of Egypt	Rameses's soldiers, additional voices		
1999	Tarzan	Larry, additional voices		
1999	The Iron Giant	John the army diver sub, additional voices		
1999	Seasons of Giving	Bees, additional voices	Direct-to-video	
2001	Spirited Away	Chichiyaku, additional voices	English Dub	
2001	Shrek	Lord Farquaad's guards, Hunter #1, ADR group		
2001	Atlantis: The Lost Empire	Loop Group, Sergeant		
2001	Monsters, Inc.	Interviewee #2, additional voices		
2002	Cinderella II: Dreams Come True	Additional voices	Direct-to-video	
2002	Spirit: Stallion of the Cimarron	Colonel's soldiers, ADR group		
2002	Treasure Planet	Verne, additional voices		
2003	Finding Nemo	Grey Fish		
2003	Brother Bear	Inuit Tribe Member #1, additional voices		
2004	Home on the Range	Buck, additional voices		
2004	The Incredibles	Metroville man, additional voices		
2004	The Polar Express	Additional voices		
2005	Madagascar	Crowd Member, ADR group		
2005	Chicken Little	Bear #1, additional voices		
2006	Curious George	Crocodile, Sailor #2, additional voices		
2006	Flushed Away	Henchfrog #7		
2007	Ben 10: Secret of the Omnitrix	Max Tennyson	Television film	
2008	WALL-E	Axiom Passenger #12, additional voices		
2009	Up	Horrified dog, additional voices		
2009	Cloudy with a Chance of Meatballs	Man, additional voices		
2012	Ben 10: Destroy All Aliens	Max Tennyson	Television film	
2012	Superman vs. The Elite	Jonathan Kent	Direct-to-video	
2013	Monsters University	Clive Carver, additional voices		
2015	Justice League: Throne of Atlantis	Captain	Direct-to-video	
2018	Incredibles 2	Gus Burns / Reflux, additional voices		
2018	The Death of Superman	Jonathan Kent	Direct-to-video	
2019	Reign of the Supermen	Jonathan Kent, Cemetery Worker	Direct-to-video	

=== Video games ===
Year	Title	Role	Notes
1993	Math Blaster Episode I: In Search of Spot	Narrator	
1996	Diablo	Narrator, Warrior, Pepin, Lachdanan, Archbishop Lazarus	
1998	StarCraft	Judicator Aldaris	
1998	Metal Gear Solid	Colonel Roy Campbell	Credited as Paul Otis
1999	Evil Zone	Gally "Vanish" Gregman, Brian Zar Deline	
1999	Battlezone II: Combat Commander	Padishah Frank Burns	
2000	Sword of the Berserk: Guts' Rage	Duneth, Gyove	
2000	Diablo II	Mephisto	
2000	Sacrifice	Eldred	
2000	Orphen: Scion of Sorcery	Rufus	English dub
2000	Tenchu 2: Birth of Stealth Assassins	Azuma Shiunsai	English dub
2000	Escape from Monkey Island	Gunner Simkins, Mr. Quidworth	
2000	Grandia II	Skye, Oro, Carpaccio, Brother 3	
2001	Metal Gear Solid 2: Sons of Liberty	The Colonel	
2002	Eternal Darkness: Sanity's Requiem	Paul Luther, Monk, Supervisor	
2002	EOE: Eve of Extinction	Z	
2003	Warcraft III: The Frozen Throne	Gul'dan, Varimathras, Jailor Kassan	
2004	Metal Gear Solid: The Twin Snakes	Colonel Roy Campbell	
2004	Syphon Filter: The Omega Strain	Gary Stoneman	
2004	Metal Gear Solid 3: Snake Eater	Colonel Roy Campbell	
2004	Onimusha 3	Akechi Mitsuhide	
2005	God of War	Gravedigger, Zeus	
2005	Jade Empire	Kang	
2005	Samurai Western	Franklin Goldberg, Group Leader #1	
2005	Total Overdose	Trust, Elvez, Agent Pierson, Montanez 2	
2006	Dirge of Cerberus: Final Fantasy VII	Professor Hojo	
2006	Syphon Filter: Dark Mirror	Gary Stoneman	
2006	Avatar: The Last Airbender	Dock, Xu, Bushi	
2006	Marvel: Ultimate Alliance	Ymir	
2007	Chili Con Carnage	Elvez	
2007	God of War II	Theseus	
2007	Ratchet & Clank Future: Tools of Destruction	Zephyr	
2007	Avatar: The Last Airbender – The Burning Earth	Ukano	
2007	Guild Wars: Eye of the North	Jalis Ironhammer	
2007	Ben 10: Protector of Earth	Max Tennyson	
2008	Super Smash Bros. Brawl	Roy Campbell	
2008	Crisis Core: Final Fantasy VII	Professor Hojo	
2008	Ninja Gaiden II	Muramasa	
2008	Metal Gear Solid 4: Guns of the Patriots	Roy Campbell	
2008	Condemned 2: Bloodshot	Ike Farrell, Malcolm Vanhorn	
2008	Fallout 3	Nathan, Abraham Washington, Tree Father Birch	
2008	Lost: Via Domus	John Locke	
2008	Too Human	Bragi, Wolf Veteran, Barkeep	
2008	Ben 10: Alien Force	Max Tennyson, Security System	
2008	Rise of the Argonauts	Argos	
2009	FusionFall	Max Tennyson	
2009	Ratchet & Clank Future: A Crack in Time	Guardian	
2009	Marvel: Ultimate Alliance 2	President	
2009	Ben 10 Alien Force: Vilgax Attacks	Max Tennyson	
2009	Avatar: The Game	Karl Falco	
2010	StarCraft II: Wings of Liberty	Executor, Overmind	
2010	Dead to Rights: Retribution	Frank Slate, GAC Sniper, Brawlers	
2010	No More Heroes 2: Desperate Struggle	Million Gunman, Captain Vladimir	
2010	God of War: Ghost of Sparta	Gravedigger	
2011	Ratchet & Clank: All 4 One	Zephyr	
2011	Resistance 3	Herbert Sawicki	
2011	Rage	Redstone	
2011	The Elder Scrolls V: Skyrim	Galmar Stone-Fist, Septimus Signus, Felldir	
2012	Ninja Gaiden 3	Muramasa	
2012	Diablo III	Mayor Holus, Chancellor Eamon	
2012	Spec Ops: The Line	Soldiers	
2012	Guild Wars 2	Warmaster Forgal Kernsson	
2012	Doom 3: BFG Edition	Richard Meyers	
2012	Ben 10: Omniverse	Max Tennyson, Eye Guy, Blukic, Khyber's Dog	
2013	Call of Juarez: Gunslinger	Ben	
2013	StarCraft II: Heart of the Swarm	Executor	
2015	Code Name: S.T.E.A.M.	Scarecrow	
2015	Heroes of the Storm	Mephisto	
2015	Fallout 4	Vault-Tec Rep, Arlen Glass	
2018	Super Smash Bros. Ultimate	Roy Campbell	Archival audio
2021	Shin Megami Tensei III: Nocturne HD Remaster	Lucifer	
2021	Shin Megami Tensei V	Lucifer	

=== Theme parks ===
Year	Title	Role	Notes
2005	Robots of Mars 3D Adventure	Mad Doctor, Supervisor	
