= Ben 10: Ultimate Alien – Cosmic Destruction =

2010 video game

- North American Xbox 360 cover art
- Developers: Papaya Studio (PS2, PS3, PSP, Wii, Xbox 360); Griptonite Games (DS)
- Publishers: NA: D3 Publisher; EU: Namco Bandai Games
- Writer: Charlotte Fullerton
- Composers: Mark Watters; Robert Irving; Billy Martin
- Series: Ben 10
- Engine: Vicious Engine
- Platforms: PlayStation 3 PlayStation 2 PlayStation Portable; Xbox 360; Nintendo DS; Wii
- Release: Nintendo DS, Xbox 360: NA: October 5, 2010; EU: October 29, 2010; PlayStation 2, PlayStation 3, PlayStation Portable, Wii: NA: October 5, 2010; EU: February 11, 2011
- Genre: Action-Adventure
- Mode: Single-player

Ben 10: Ultimate Alien – Cosmic Destruction is a 2010 video game based on Ben 10: Ultimate Alien and is the fifth game in the Ben 10 video game series released for the Xbox 360, PlayStation 3, PlayStation 2, Wii, PlayStation Portable and Nintendo DS on October 5, 2010.

== Overview ==
Ben 10 Ultimate Alien: Cosmic Destruction introduces the new alien heroes and challenging puzzle elements. Players control Ben Tennyson and up to 16 alien transformations, including Ultimate Big Chill, Ultimate Spidermonkey, Ultimate Echo Echo, Ultimate Swampfire, Ultimate Humungousaur, Four Arms (PS3) and Rath (Xbox 360).

The game involves Ben traveling around the world in search of the parts to an ancient Galvan artifact called the Potis Altiare to save the Earth from total destruction by an evil To'kustar.

== Release ==
The game was announced by D3 Publisher in May 2010 for a release in October.

In Europe, the game was first released for the Xbox 360 and Nintendo DS on October 29, 2010. The other versions were released on February 11, 2011.

== Reception ==
Reception

Aggregate score
Aggregator	Score
Metacritic	(X360) 51/100

Review scores
Publication	Score
Nintendo World Report	6/10
The Guardian	2/5

The game was given mixed reviews, being criticized for its limited length, game mechanics, as well as several gameplay and design concepts. Fans, however, consider this an improvement over past games in the franchise, especially the transformation and combat mechanics having a smoother flow than before.
