= Ben 10 (2005 TV series) =

American animated television series

- Also known as: Classic Ben 10
- Genre: Action-adventure; Science fantasy; Superhero
- Created by: Man of Action
- Directed by: Scooter Tidwell; Alex Soto; Sebastian O. Montes III
- Voices of: Tara Strong; Meagan Smith; Paul Eiding; Dee Bradley Baker; Steven Blum; Richard Steven Horvitz; Richard McGonagle; Fred Tatasciore; Jim Ward
- Theme music composer: Andy Sturmer
- Opening theme: "Ben 10", performed by Moxy
- Ending theme: "Ben 10" (instrumental)
- Composer: Andy Sturmer
- Country of origin: United States
- Original language: English
- No. of seasons: 4
- No. of episodes: 49 (list of episodes)

Production
- Executive producers: Brian A. Miller (for Cartoon Network Studios); Sam Register
- Producers: Kelly Crews (season 1); Donna Smith (seasons 2–4)
- Running time: 22 minutes
- Production company: Cartoon Network Studios

Original release
- Network: Cartoon Network
- Release: December 27, 2005 – April 15, 2008

Related
- Ben 10: Alien Force; Ben 10 (2016)

Ben 10 is an American animated series created by the writer collective, Man of Action for Cartoon Network. The series follows ten-year-old Ben Tennyson, who discovers a watch-like alien device known as the Omnitrix. Attached to his wrist, it allows him to transform into various alien creatures, each with unique abilities, which he uses to combat threats on Earth and beyond alongside his cousin Gwen and their grandfather Max.

The series premiered on Cartoon Network as a sneak peek on December 27, 2005, as part of "Sneak Peek Week", alongside programs such as My Gym Partner's a Monkey, Robotboy, and Zixx. It officially debuted on January 13, 2006, and concluded on April 15, 2008.

Ben 10 received positive reception and was nominated for two Emmy Awards, winning one for Outstanding Individual Achievement in Animation. Its success led to the creation of a multimedia franchise, including sequel series such as Ben 10: Alien Force, Ben 10: Ultimate Alien, and Ben 10: Omniverse, as well as a reboot in 2016.

== Premise ==
The series centers on Ben Tennyson (Tara Strong), a ten-year-old boy traveling across the United States during his summer vacation with his cousin Gwen (Meagan Smith) and their grandfather Max (Paul Eiding). On their first night camping in Max's RV, the Rustbucket, Ben discovers an alien pod containing the Omnitrix, a mysterious prototype that attaches itself to his wrist and grants him the ability to transform into a variety of alien lifeforms, each possessing distinct powers and abilities.

As Ben adjusts to his newfound abilities, he learns the responsibilities that come with being a hero. The series primarily follows the trio's episodic adventures during their road trip, as they encounter a wide range of adversaries, including extraterrestrial villains and supernatural threats.

== Characters ==
=== The Tennysons ===
- Benjamin "Ben" Kirby Tennyson (voiced by Tara Strong):

Ben is a confident and occasionally immature boy who enjoys attention and often makes jokes, even in tense situations. Despite his impulsive behavior, he is good-hearted, loyal, and motivated by a genuine desire to help others. Ben discovers the alien-watchlike device called the "Omnitrix" which was launched to Earth on camp site where it attached on Ben's left wrist, allowing him to transform into 10 or more different aliens with superhuman powers and abilities, and later on, he used it to fight evil. He is highly protective of his family and is willing to risk his safety to defend anyone in danger. Though playful by nature, he demonstrates intelligence, adaptability, and an eidetic memory, often relying on his quick thinking to overcome challenges when his usual means fall short. Ben's catchphrases include "It's Hero Time!" and "Goin' Hero!".

- Gwendolyn "Gwen" Tennyson (voiced by Meagan Smith):

Gwen is Ben's cousin and is depicted as a kind and intelligent girl, very skilled with computers and possessing a level of martial arts skills. She is also very independent but is very organized, sometimes to the point of compulsive, but can be a light-hearted schemer and immature as Ben. Overall, her most notable skill is her innate, if latent, ability at magic, first shown in "Tough Luck" when she was able to use Hex's staff, which can only be used by a master magician, to defeat Charmcaster. She later obtains Charmcaster's spellbook in "Change of Face" and begins improving her magic.

- Magister Maxwell "Max" Tennyson (voiced by Paul Eiding):

Ben and Gwen's grandfather, who takes the two on a cross-country road trip for Summer vacation. In "Truth", Max reveals he was a part of an intergalactic secret agency known as "The Plumbers" and handled many extraterrestrial encounters in the past. His history as a Plumber has given him knowledge, training, and equipment for fighting aliens as well as an unconventional taste in food, much to the dismay of his grandchildren. In "The Visitor," an old alien acquaintance of Max's called Xylene reveals that Max was the intended recipient of the Prototype Omnitrix.

=== Antagonists ===
- Vilgax (voiced by Steve Blum) – A Chimera Sui Generis warlord regarded as one of the most feared aliens in the galaxy. His primary goal in the show is to obtain the Prototype Omnitrix, which he wishes to use in order to create an army of soldiers who can transform at his command. Vilgax is revealed to have crossed paths with Max, having faced Max before. For the majority of the first season, Vilgax was injured and remained in a regeneration chamber until the first season finale. Once healed, he was cybernetically enhanced, giving him colossal size, strength and durability that made him a match for every alien Ben could access at that time. Vilgax was the main antagonist of the first season and second season, a recurring antagonist in third season and the main antagonist in the final episode of the fourth season.
- Dr. Animo (voiced by Dwight Schultz) – A promising veterinary scientist whose career was cut short when he was discovered performing twisted genetic experiments on mutating animals. He had hoped that his research would win him the Verties Award. Because of the nature of his research, he lost the award to another doctor named Kelly. This drove him insane, and he dropped off the map for five years until he could perfect his research. After being defeated by Ben for the first time, Dr. Animo makes himself a personal nemesis to the boy, always hoping to defeat him and rule the world. His powers include controlling mutant animals, reviving them and creating them. He is Ben's tertiary archenemy.
- Kevin 11 (Note: The character's last name would be revealed as "Levin" in Alien Force) (voiced by Michael Reisz in Season 1; by Charlie Schlatter in Seasons 2–4) – An 11-year-old delinquent sociopath with powers that allow him to absorb energy. He uses the ability to commit crimes to benefit himself. He initially seeks to team up with Ben to become unstoppable, but after Ben refuses, he absorbs power from the Prototype Omnitrix instead. This transformation drives him to cause chaos and serve as a recurring adversary to Ben, earning him the nickname "Kevin 11". Later in the series, Kevin transforms into a hybrid form of all of Ben's aliens without the ability to revert to his human form.
- Zs'Skayr (Note: The character was originally referred to as Ghostfreak, with his true name, Zs'Skayr, being revealed in the series' pop-up trivia. He is properly referred to as Zs'Skayr in Ben 10: Omniverse.) (voiced by Steve Blum) – An Ectonurite high king whose rule over the Anur star system saw an opportunity to expand when he learned of the Omnitrix from one of Vilgax's crash-landed data probes. While searching for the Omnitrix, Zs'Skayr was inadvertently scanned into the device, resulting in his consciousness being trapped in it until he manages to escape in the episode "Ghostfreaked Out".
  - Doctor Viktor (voiced by Michael Dorn) - An alien resembling Frankenstein's monster who is Zs'Skayr's second in command and oversees his master's plan during Season 3. While trying to stop Ben from interfering with their plan, Viktor accidentally opens a portal to the Null Void and is sucked in.
  - The Werewolf - A werewolf-like alien who serves Zs'Skayr and gathers satellite equipment for his master's plan. When the Tennysons' interference causes the satellite equipment gather to explode, the Werewolf is caught in the blast.
  - The Mummy - A mummy-like alien who serves Zs'Skayr, gathering a dangerous energy crystal with mutagenic properties called Corrodium. When Viktor opens a portal to the Null Void, the Mummy is sucked in along with him.
- The Forever Knights – A secret British paramilitary organization formed during the Middle Ages and evolved into an international syndicate that first came to the United States in the 1920s.
  - Enoch (voiced by Richard Doyle) – One of the leaders of the Forever Knights, though he mostly works behind the scenes and rarely directly battles the Tennysons. At the end of "Perfect Day" he becomes trapped in his own dream machine and is replaced by the Forever King.
  - Driscoll / Forever King (voiced by Richard Doyle) – A former Plumber disgraced after being caught stealing technologies from alien criminals for personal gain, who joined the Forever Knights and eventually became their leader with the goal of achieving world domination. After learning of the Plumbers' secret "sub-energy" weapon the Forever King assembles the Negative 10, a team of the Tennysons' human enemies, to steal it to achieve his goal. He was the main antagonist of the fourth season.
- Hex (voiced by Khary Payton; Kari Wahlgren as a child)– A self-proclaimed master magician and sorcerer from the inter-dimensional world of Ledgerdomain.
  - Charmcaster (voiced by Kari Wahlgren)– Hex's gifted 15-year-old niece, who initially appears loyal to her uncle, Hex, but is later revealed to have been using him to pursue power for herself. In the episode "A Change of Face", Charmcaster attempts to swap bodies with Ben to gain possession of the Omnitrix, but accidentally swaps with Gwen instead. The plan ultimately fails, and Gwen steals her spellbook. Charmcaster later joins the Negative 10 to seek revenge on the Tennysons, though her primary grudge is against Gwen. Her abilities include mana manipulation and spellcasting. She primarily serves as Gwen's archenemy.

== Voice cast ==
=== Main ===
- Tara Strong – Ben Tennyson, Upgrade, Benwolf, (Note: Renamed as Blitzwolfer in Ben 10: Omniverse.) Buzzshock, Gwendolyn Tennyson (future), Mrs. Fang, Edith, Lucy Mann, Ken Tennyson, Sandra Tennyson
- Meagan Smith – Gwen Tennyson
- Paul Eiding – Max "Grandpa Max" Tennyson
- Steve Blum – Vilgax, Heatblast, Ghostfreak, Four Arms (4-year-old), Heat Jaws, (Note: Hybrid form of Ripjaws and Heatblast) Zs'Skayr, Mr. Mann, Roger, Edward White, Steve Cummings, Bob
- Dee Bradley Baker – Wildmutt, Stinkfly, Eye Guy, Spitter, Stink Arms, (Note: Hybrid form of Four Arms and Stinkfly) Carl Tennyson, Huge Limax, Mutant Frog, Mutant Cockatiel, Joe, Acid Breath, Stone Creatures, SixSix, Porcupine, Immovable Object, Mr. Zu, Interpreter Alien, Drones, Elsgood (Old), Joel Tennyson, Camille's Ex-Boyfriend, Scooter (in "A Change of Face"), Amazing Alan
- Jim Ward – Diamondhead, XLR8, Wildvine, Diamond Matter, (Note: Hybrid form of Diamondhead and Grey Matter) Gordon Tennyson, Captain Shaw, Jack, Hotel Guard, Mr. Beck, S.A.M.
- Richard Steven Horvitz – Grey Matter, Sublimino, Billy, Arnold
- Richard McGonagle – Four Arms, Dr. Kelly, Exo-Skull, President, Scooter (in "Hijacked")
- Fred Tatasciore – Ripjaws, Cannonbolt, Way Big, Ben 10,000, Duane, Krakken, Mycelium, Bug-Lite, Coach Finn, Scooter (in "The Return"), Doomicus

=== Additional ===
- Jack Angel – Technorg
- Clancy Brown – Kenko
- Bettina Bush – Kai Green
- Cathy Cavadini – Cooper
- Larry Cedar – Howell Wainwright
- Rosalind Chao – Councilwoman Liang
- John Cygan – Abel North, Kane North
- Grey DeLisle – Heatblast (Gwen), Xylene, Camille Mann, Mrs. Mann
- John DiMaggio – Baron Highway, Vulkanus
- Michael Dorn – Viktor, Benvicktor (Note: Renamed as Frankenstrike in Ben 10: Omniverse)
- Jeff Doucette – Thumbskull
- Robin Atkin Downes – Jonah Melville
- Richard Doyle – Enoch, Mr. Jingles, Driscoll
- Walker Edmiston – Marty
- Greg Ellis – Synaptak
- Dave Fennoy – Tetrax Shard
- Miriam Flynn – Vera Tennyson, Old Woman
- Michael Gough – Lt. Steel
- Richard Green – Benmummy (Note: Renamed as Snare-oh in Ben 10: Omniverse)
- Kim Mai Guest – Pinky, Andy, Young Elsgood
- Nicholas Guest – Clancy
- Jennifer Hale – Rojo, Turbine, Jamie, Mandy, Ben's teacher
- Tom Kane – Ultimos, Donovan Grand Smith, Arctiguana
- John Kassir – Zombozo
- Josh Keaton – Tim Dean, Hector
- Patricia Lentz – Shelby, Mildred
- Jennifer Malenke – Missy
- Vanessa Marshall – Diamondhead (Gwen), Four Arms (Gwen), Myaxx, Tini, Cannonbolt (Gwen)
- James C. Mathis III – Enforcer Alien
- Miguel Najera – Wes Green
- Nolan North – Brad
- Robert Patrick – Phil
- Rob Paulsen – Ditto
- Khary Payton – Hex
- Rob Pinkston – Todd Maplewood
- Robert Picardo – Leader Alien
- Bill Ratner – Narrator in "Gwen 10" and "Goodbye and Good Riddance"
- Michael Reisz – Kevin (Season 1)
- Neil Ross – Laurence Wainwright
- Charlie Schlatter – Kevin (Seasons 2–4), Kevin 11,000, Devlin
- Dwight Schultz – Dr. Animo, Earl
- Armin Shimerman – Slix Vigma
- Kath Soucie – Edwin Grand Smith, Joan Maplewood, Tiffany
- Jason Spisak – Gatorboy
- Cree Summer – Frightwig
- Mark Thompson – Vance Vetteroy
- Kari Wahlgren – Charmcaster, Baby Hex, Grey Matter (Gwen)
- B.J. Ward – Betty Jean Tennyson
- Billy West – Kraab
- Dave Wittenberg – Upchuck, Road Rage
- Adam Wylie – J.T, Max Tennyson (10 years old), Peterson
- Keone Young – Ishiyama

== Episodes ==
Season	Episodes	Originally released	
Season	Episodes	First released	Last released
1	13	December 27, 2005	March 25, 2006
2	13	May 29, 2006	October 9, 2006
3	13	November 25, 2006	April 21, 2007
4	10	July 14, 2007	April 15, 2008

== Production ==
Steven E. Gordon's original concepts for Ben 10, in which a red-haired Ben Tennyson uses the Omnitrix to transform into ten human superheroes.

=== Development ===
Ben 10 was created by Man of Action and was produced by Cartoon Network Studios. Man of Action is a group consisting of comic book creators Duncan Rouleau, Joe Casey, Joe Kelly, and Steven T. Seagle. The group worked on Ben 10's concept roughly 3 years before Cartoon Network picked up the series. Dave Johnson designed the first two seasons of the show.

In the early 2000s, Man of Action was hired by Cartoon Network Studios to create an action animated show. They pitched twenty different ideas in twenty minutes, with each being a minute long. The eighth pitch, one about a boy named Ben 10 with the ability to change between 10 transformations, ended up being chosen. It was pitched to Cartoon Network in 2002 and during pre-production phases, the title went through several revisions, including Force 10 and Ben to the Tenth. The pitch in its earliest stages featured Ben Tennyson wielding a device known as the "Megawhat" that would transform him into alternate versions of himself around the multiverse. Around this time, the working title was Ben^{10}, before the final title was decided to be Ben 10.

Early on in development, it was decided that a villain would be within the Omnitrix. After Ghostfreak was created the creators added dialogue into the first season to hint to the audience that there was something more to the character. Originally Cannonbolt, the 11th alien transformation in the series, was going to be in the original set of aliens, but was replaced with Ghostfreak.

When doing test animations for the series the first alien transformation to be tested was Four Arms. It was the most popular transformation out of all the aliens for "Man of Action". Many of the unused designs for Upchuck were recycled in the episode "Ben 10,000" as two of Ben's aliens "Spitter" and "Articguana", and as villain Sploot.

Steven E. Gordon worked on an early version of the show. His concept work reveals that Ben Tennyson was originally going to be a red-headed young boy. Gordon also has early designs of the Omnitrix which look more like a watch than the final version, as well as different designs and names for the alien transformations. Some of the early names for the transformations were "StrongGuy", "Inferno", "RazorJaws", "Dragonfly", "Plantguy", and "Digger". Some of the early designs for the aliens are more human and superheroic, similar to Dial H for Hero.

Sunmin Image Pictures, Dong Woo Animation and Lotto Animation, Inc. contributed some of the animation for this series.

=== Theme song ===
The theme song for the series was written by Andy Sturmer and sung by Mz. Moxy. The main intro sequence was created by Renegade Animation, who was well known for Hi Hi Puffy AmiYumi, which was created by Ben 10's executive producer Sam Register. The flash animated sequence during the main title was designed to let the audience know that the show is going to be fun and not just an action show. The opening credits were altered in the third season and beyond to reflect that Ghostfreak was no longer to be used, and was replaced by Cannonbolt as the ninth alien.

=== Casting ===
Kris Zimmerman was in charge of casting and was the voice director. Tara Strong voices the title character Ben Tennyson, Upgrade, Benwolf, Lucy Mann-Tennyson, Ken Tennyson, and Sandra Tennyson. She also voices Future Gwen and Buzzshock in "Ben 10,000". Meagan Smith voices Ben's cousin Gwen Tennyson, and Paul Eiding voices Grandpa Max and his version of Upgrade.

Steven Blum voices Ben's alien transformations Heatblast and Ghostfreak, as well as the series' main villain Vilgax. Dee Bradley Baker voices Ben's transformations Stinkfly, Eye Guy, and Wildmutt, Baker also voices Ben's school bully/friend Cash Murray, and many of his enemies such as The Limax, SixSix, Acid Breath, and the character Elsgood. Baker is also notable for voicing various characters and aliens. Richard Steven Horvitz voices Ben's Grey Matter transformation and the villain Sublimino. Richard McGonagle voices Ben's Four Arms transformation, and the villain Exo-Skull. Fred Tatasciore voices Ben's aliens Ripjaws, Cannonbolt, and Way Big, Tatasciore also voices a future version of Ben in "Ben 10,000". Jim Ward voices the transformations Diamondhead, XLR8, and Wildvine, and the character Gordon Tennyson.

== Films, sequels, and spin-offs ==
=== TV films ===
Two Ben 10 films have been released at different times during 2007 and 2008. The first is a regular animated feature called Secret of the Omnitrix, in which the Omnitrix is accidentally set to self-destruct and Ben must track down its creator to stop it. A trailer of the film was released with the film Billy & Mandy: Wrath of the Spider Queen, and it aired August 10, 2007. Michael Ouweleen described the film's villain, which was actually Vilgax, as "like Darth Vader without the sense of humor." A different version of Secrets of the Omnitrix, which introduced a different alien (Eye Guy) to the one in the original (Heatblast), aired on September 1, 2007. A third version (in which XLR8 was featured) aired on October 20, 2007. It was stated during the premiere of Alien Force that Secret of the Omnitrix was intended to be the chronological finale of Ben 10, even though it was broadcast long before the last episode, which was not canon.

A CGI movie titled Ben 10: Destroy All Aliens was first released on March 11, 2012, in Asia and on March 23, 2012 in the US. The movie focuses on a 10-year-old Ben returning to school after the summer. The movie was released in 2 different versions on Asia. The Filipino viewers heard the Philippine winners while the rest of Southeast Asia heard the Malaysian kids.

Ben 10: Race Against Time is the first film in the series, which was also the first of the two Ben 10-related media in live-action. It revolves around Ben (Graham Phillips), Gwen (Haley Ramm) and Grandpa Max (Lee Majors) returning to their hometown of Bellwood and attempting to adjust to being 'normal' again. Unfortunately, their lives are once again disrupted by a mysterious alien known as Eon (Christien Anholt), who has an unexpected connection to the Omnitrix.

=== Sequel series ===
Ben 10: Alien Force is the sequel to the show set five years after the original series. As an indirect result, this series is darker in tone compared to its predecessor. The series premiered on Cartoon Network on April 18, 2008, and ended on March 26, 2010. It has since been premiered in Canada, on Teletoon. A video game of the show is now out for the Nintendo DS, Wii, PlayStation 2 and PlayStation Portable.

Another sequel series, Ben 10: Ultimate Alien, premiered on April 23, 2010, and takes place 3–4 weeks after the finale of Alien Force.

=== Protector of Earth ===
Ben 10: Protector of Earth is the first Ben 10 video game, released in autumn 2007.

Following the success of the Ben 10 animated TV series and films, various Ben 10 merchandise has been released for general sale. These items include Ben 10 books, action figures, card games such as Top Trumps, toys, video games – notably Ben 10: Protector of Earth, bedding, and footwear.

=== FusionFall ===
Ben 10 appears in Cartoon Network's online MMO FusionFall. The character design for Ben Tennyson was changed when the original Ben 10 series ended and was replaced by Ben 10: Alien Force. In the game, he serves as a "Player Guide" offering guide-based missions and special items that can only be used with certain guides.

== Home media ==
Ben 10 (2005) home video releases
Season	Episodes	Years active	Release dates
Season	Episodes	Years active	Region 1
1	13	2005–06	February 6, 2007
2	13	2006	October 9, 2007
3	13	2006–07	The Complete Third Season: March 4, 2008; Ben 10 and Friends (episodes 27–32, 36): April 22, 2014
4	10 + 1 film (Note: This DVD not only contains the entirety of season 4, but it also has the film Ben 10: Secret of the Omnitrix, which were 3 episodes from the season that were combined and packaged as a television film.)	2007–08	August 5, 2008
Films		2007–12	Race Against Time: April 8, 2008; Secret of the Omnitrix: May 20, 2008; Destroy All Aliens: April 16, 2013
