= Generator Rex =

American animated television science fiction series

- Genre: Action-adventure; Science fiction; Comedy drama; Superhero; Post-apocalyptic
- Created by: Man of Action
- Based on: M. Rex by: Aaron Sowd; John Keneta; Maurice Augunda; Joe Kelly; Duncan Rouleau
- Developed by: Rob Hoegee
- Directed by: Christofer Graham; Rick Morales; Seung-Hyun Oh; Samuel Montes; Kenji Ono; John Fang
- Voices of: Daryl Sabara; Wally Kurth; John DiMaggio; Grey DeLisle; Fred Savage; J. K. Simmons; Troy Baker; Hynden Walch; Tara Sands; Freddy Rodriguez; Jennifer Hale
- Theme music composer: Kevin Manthei
- Opening theme: "Revolution" by Orange
- Composer: Kevin Manthei
- Country of origin: United States
- Original language: English
- No. of seasons: 3
- No. of episodes: 60 (2 unaired) (list of episodes)

Production
- Executive producers: For Cartoon Network Studios: Brian A. Miller; Jennifer Pelphrey; For Cartoon Network: Tramm Wigzell; Rob Swartz (seasons 1–2); Rob Sorcher
- Producer: Ryan Slater
- Running time: 22 minutes
- Production company: Cartoon Network Studios

Original release
- Network: Cartoon Network
- Release: April 23, 2010 – January 3, 2013

Related
- Ben 10 (2005–2021); The Secret Saturdays (2008–2010)

Generator Rex is an American animated superhero television series created by Man of Action for Cartoon Network, with John Fang of Cartoon Network Studios as supervising producer. It is based on the comic M. Rex, created by Aaron Sowd, John Keneta, Maurice Augunda, Joe Kelly and Duncan Rouleau, and published by Image Comics in 1999. The series premiered in the United States on April 23, 2010, on Cartoon Network, and concluded on January 3, 2013, with a total of 60 episodes, plus two episodes remained unaired.

A two-part crossover special with Ben 10: Ultimate Alien, titled Ben 10/Generator Rex: Heroes United, aired on November 25, 2011, while a second 44-minute four-part special, Ben Gen 10, aired on April 11, 2021, featuring different and younger versions of the Generator Rex characters in the Ben 10 universe.

== Plot ==
=== Seasons 1–2 (2010–11) ===
Five years prior to the events of the series, an explosion occurred on Earth, causing microscopic machines called "nanites" to infiltrate the bodies of all its organic life. When activated, nanites mutate the biology of their hosts; living beings with activated nanites are known as Exponentially Variegated Organisms (E.V.O.). Rex Salazar is an amnesiac fourteen-year-old boy and permanent E.V.O. who, unlike most other E.V.O.s, lacks physical deformation but has forgotten his past. He is also able to control his active nanites, allowing him to manifest from his body various bio-mechanical abilities and powers. He also has the unique ability to deactivate nanites inside other E.V.O.s, effectively curing them of their mutations and returning them to normal. Working for Providence under Agent Six and White Knight, Rex uses his unique abilities to stop and cure rampant E.V.O.s.

His archenemy, Van Kleiss, is a British scientist who became an earth-manipulating humanoid E.V.O.. He despises Providence and is connected to the original nanite explosion, which is noted as "the Nanite Event" five years prior. He seeks to become all-powerful by using fellow E.V.O.s, and promises to tell Rex about his childhood past if he will join him, using the former's blooming relationship with the siren-like human E.V.O. Circe to do so. Upon attaining Rex's nanites, Van Kleiss acquires the opposing ability to create E.V.O.s upon physical contact; whereas Rex fully regains his powers and access to new and greater machinery from his Omega-1 Nanite after fully tapping into the further evolved nanite's greater technological abilities.

After her second and final mission with the Pack, Circe defects when Van Kleiss threatens Rex's life and joins his E.V.O. street gang in Hong Kong. To further complicate matters, Rex's long-lost elder brother Dr. Cesar Salazar suddenly resurfaces and joins Providence. At one point, Van Kleiss and Rex are forced to work together to escape the artificial intelligence Zag-RS, who is revealed to be a creation of Caesar's who modeled her voice after their late Mexican mother Violetta. Back in Hong Kong, Rex encounters and defeats his former boss Quarry, who was given a proposition from Van Kleiss, but was taken to Abysus for punishment after double-crossing him. Rex's ninja-like partner Six suffers amnesia from a machine of Cesar's invention, but chooses not to regain his memories. In a last-ditch effort to achieve his ultimate goal of becoming a god, Van Kleiss further develops Breach's portal-creating ability, allowing her to travel through time. As a result of her abilities, Rex is sent six months into the future and Van Kleiss is sent to the ancient past. In the future, it is revealed that everything has changed drastically since Rex's "disappearance", and he is shocked to meet a woman in charge of Providence who calls herself the "Black Knight."

=== Season 3 (2011–13) ===
Rex is sent six months into the future by Breach's abilities, where everything has changed since his "six-month disappearance" and Providence has been taken over by a woman called the Black Knight. She attempts to manipulate Rex into utilizing his abilities to aid her in "saving" humanity by restarting the Nanite Project with those who had funded it six years ago to become all-powerful by ensuring the creation of five nanites called the Meta Nanites, which contain the "God Code." The first four were scattered across the planet due to the Nanite Event, and the fifth and most powerful one has been kept hidden within Rex himself. Cesar and their late Hispanic scientist parents, Rafael and Violetta Salazar, had secretly programmed them to fully work for him alone.

Upon merging with the God Code, Rex utilizes his newly attained godhood to successfully cure all E.V.O.s. Afterwards, he is reunited with his now-normal friends - Tuck, Cricket and Sqywdd - and girlfriend Circe, and forgives Cesar for his past actions. Van Kleiss, who is revealed to have been responsible for Rafael and Violetta's deaths by trapping them inside as the nanite reactor exploded, is taken to Breach's pocket dimension of Greenville, Ohio.

== Characters ==
=== Main characters ===
- Daryl Sabara as Rex Salazar, Rombauer (1st time), White Fighter, East Side kid
- Wally Kurth as Agent Six, Captain Calan, Maxwell, Systems Op
- John DiMaggio as Bobo Haha, Skalamander, Architect, Jungle Cat, Pete Volkov, Robo Bobo Haha, Michael, Hunter Cain (2nd time), Dark figure, Rath, Providence Agent (1st time), Huckster, Vostok, Pyreptryx, Nyquist, Biruta, Umpire, Infected 2, Human EVO, Lunk, Waiter (1st time), Payson, Bug, DJ, Older Providence worker, Dock Worker, Guard 1, Providence Tech (2nd time), Villager, Providence Soldier 1 (2nd time), Black Pawn
- Grey DeLisle as Rebecca Holiday, ZAG-RS, Little Girl (Slug EVO), Woman (Rock & Mud EVO), Female Co-pilot, Doctor Rhodes, Diane Farrah, Isabella, Violeta Salazar, Little Spanish boy, Reporter, Kate, Larvus, Wade, Waitress, House wife, Trig Student 2, Beach Girl 1, Echoey Voice 2, Computer, Innocent girl, News Reporter, Librarian, Lady
- J.K. Simmons as White Knight, Cured E.V.O., Waiter (2nd time), Control Voice
- Fred Savage as Noah Nixon, Beagle (1st time), Waylan, Infected 1, Sit-Ops Tech, Team leader
- Troy Baker as Van Kleiss, Biowulf, Agent Weaver, Roswell, Captured zombie, Businessman, Etude, Echoey Voice 1, United Nations Official, Providence Tech (2nd time), Guard, Male Party-Goer, Providence Soldier 1 (1st time)

=== Recurring characters ===
- Hynden Walch as Breach, Chinese hostess
- Tara Sands as Circe, Beach Girl 2
- Freddy Rodriguez as Caesar Salazar, Contraption Voice, Providence Soldier 2
- Joe Casey as Shades
- Joe Kelly as McKelly
- Duncan Rouleau as Dunky
- Jeff Bennett as Peter Meechum (1st time), Providence agent (1st time)
- Dee Bradley Baker as Foul Mouth, Stork EVO, Principal Rothberger, Gabriel, Humungousaur, Diamondhead, Lodestar, Big Chill, Four Arms, Cannonbolt, Upchuck, Terrified student
- Luke Perry as Jacob
- Will Shadley as Caleb
- Brent Spiner as Gabriel Rylander
- Fred Tatasciore as NoFace, Providence Tech (1st time)
- Khary Payton as Male Pilot, Beasly, Male cadet, Gang Punk
- Danica McKellar as Claire Bowman
- Felicia Day as Annie
- Mark Hamill as Quarry, Scientist 2
- Dante Basco as Tuck
- Jason Marsden as Skwydd, Lieutenant, Scientist 1, Gamer boy, Hipster
- Vyvan Pham as Cricket, Female vendor
- James Hong as Vendor, Providence Agent (2nd time)
- Kevin Michael Richardson as Knuckles, EVO Guard, Tripp
- John Cena as Hunter Cain (1st time)
- Dave Wittenberg as Instigator, Blue collar worker
- Rob Paulsen as Bouvier †, Agent Jackson, Providence tech, Cap-Com, Providence Technician, Loud Speaker, Pyramid guide
- Carlos Alazraqui as Drill Instructor Hutton, Dos, Lansky, Reynaldo, Lecturer, Senor Muchado, Rafael Salazar, Old man, Providence Agent (3rd time), Uniformed Providence Agent, Judge
- Rutina Wesley as Kenwyn Jones
- James Horan as Dr. Fell, Fortier
- Greg Ellis as Gatlocke
- Marion Ross as Carmen, Determined Grandmother, Grandma
- Robin Atkin Downes as Dr. Hogdson, Reddick, Sir Anthony Haden-Scott, Ship Captain
- Matthew Lillard as Serge
- Kath Soucie as Mouse, Female Party-Goer
- Blake Lewis as Thump
- Jim Cummings as Trey
- Frank Welker as One, IV
- Olivia d'Abo as Five
- Maria Canals-Barrera as Valentina
- Miguel Sandoval as Oso Maretelo, Agent Alvarez, Guard 2
- Phil LaMarr as Rombauer (2nd time), First Talking Announcer
- Tom Kenny as Mr. Buchiner, Fitzy Feakins, Announcer
- Daran Norris as Coach, Burly Jock
- James Arnold Taylor as Video kid, Trig Student 1
- David Barrera as Mayor Esteban
- Shelley Morrison as Abeula Salazar
- Bobby Soto as Federico Salazar
- Nolan North as Branden Moses, Security Guard
- Jennifer Stone as Beverly Holiday
- Steven T. Seagle as Beagle (2nd time), Providence agent (2nd time)
- Jennifer Hale as Black Knight
- Jack DeSena as Lance, Rand
- Yuri Lowenthal as Moss, Ben Tennyson, Upgrade
- Maurice LaMarche as Valve
- Sandra Echeverria as Beatriz
- Randee Heller as Donna
- Bob Joles as Egyptian cook
- Hakeem Kae-Kazim as Ghaurn Set
- Roxanne Pallett
- Lacey Chabert as Goggles Girl, JoJo
- Keith Szarabajka as Black Pawn Lieutenant
- David Kaye as Shocksquatch
- Michael Emerson as Alpha
- Corey Burton as Septimius Severus
- Andy Milder as John Scarecrow
- Wil Wheaton as Peter Meechum (2nd time)
- Rick Negron as Senor Durango
- Christian Lanz as Chiquito
- Steve Blum as Sebastian, Leon Adler
- Greg Cipes as Sly Tyler
- Quinton Flynn as Beau Boe

== Episodes ==
Season	Episodes	Originally released	
Season	Episodes	First released	Last released
1	21	April 23, 2010	December 10, 2010
2	19	February 4, 2011	November 4, 2011
3	20 (2 unaired)	November 11, 2011	January 3, 2013
Ben Gen 10		April 10, 2021	

Generator Rex ended on January 3, 2013, and then aired reruns on Cartoon Network until 2013. Episodes 56 through 60 were released on iTunes for purchase before they aired. The show "ended" with its third season, but had left out many important things unresolved before the two-part season three finale "Endgame"; namely Rex and Circe's romantic relationship that finally blossomed at the end of Episode 51 "Assault on Abysus" and with Rex rescuing her from Providence ("Mind Games") some time before the two-part finale.

== Crossovers ==
On July 11, 2011, the schedule for the 2011 San Diego Comic-Con revealed that during Cartoon Network's panel, a crossover special between the Ben 10: Ultimate Alien and Generator Rex series titled Ben 10/Generator Rex: Heroes United would be discussed. During the conference, show creators Man of Action revealed that the crossover would be a special, extended episode of Generator Rex, which aired on November 25, 2011, on Cartoon Network. The double-length special revolved around Ben Tennyson and Rex fighting a villain, originally created by Rex's older brother Caesar, the Alpha Nanite. Rex makes a cameo appearance in the OK K.O.! Let's Be Heroes episode "Crossover Nexus" along with many other Cartoon Network shows. On February 17, 2021, it was announced Generator Rex would have a 44-minute crossover special with the Ben 10 reboot series, which aired on April 11, 2021.

== Other media ==
=== Home video ===
Warner Home Video released Volume 1 DVD, a two-disc set that contains the first nine episodes of the series on October 19, 2010.

=== Video game ===
A video game, entitled Generator Rex: Agent of Providence, was developed for Wii, PlayStation 3, Nintendo DS, Nintendo 3DS and Xbox 360. It was released on November 1, 2011, in the United States, developed by Virtuos and published by Activision. The plot involves Van Kleiss attempting to find blueprints to build an Omega-One Nanite. The entire voice cast reprises their roles from the series. Agent of Providence was given an E10+ rating by ESRB. The game was also scored by the series' composer, Kevin Manthei.

=== Toy line ===
Mattel produced a toy line based on the series. For the main figures, each is approximately 4 inches tall and packaged with an ordinary day E.V.O. There were also deluxe figures, EVO attack packs, as well as other waves and lines that were never released. A line from MEGA Bloks was announced (in 2010) featuring construction sets.

=== Publications ===
Cartoon Network featured Generator Rex and Ben 10 in DC Comics's Cartoon Network: Action Pack comic books. Two 3D picture books (featuring cardboard 3D glasses) "EVOs and Heroes," a whole analysis on characters and their abilities and "The Swarm," an adaption of the episode of the same name, where Rex must fight insect E.V.O.s that feed on metal, have also been released. For beginning readers, the story "Leader of the Pack" is also based on an episode and features Rex and Bobo being captured and locked in an underground prison cell.

In February 2013, IDW Publishing announced a partnership with Cartoon Network to produce comic books and issues based on its properties. Generator Rex along with Ben 10 was one of the titles announced to be published.

== Awards ==
Year	Award	Category	Recipients and nominees	Result
2010	62nd Primetime Emmy Awards	Outstanding Individual in Animation	Chu-Hui Song and Nora Murphy-Breden for the episode "The Day That Changed Everything"	Won

== See also ==
- M. Rex
