= Ben 10: Omniverse =

American animated television series

- Genre: Science fiction; Action; Adventure; Comedy drama; Superhero
- Created by: Man of Action
- Developed by: Derrick J. Wyatt; Matt Youngberg
- Written by: Matt Wayne; Charlotte Fullerton
- Voices of: Yuri Lowenthal; Bumper Robinson; Paul Eiding; Dee Bradley Baker; Eric Bauza; Corey Burton; John DiMaggio; David Kaye; Rob Paulsen; Kevin Michael Richardson; Tara Strong
- Theme music composer: Parry Gripp
- Opening theme: "Ben 10"
- Ending theme: "Ben 10" (Instrumental)
- Composer: Sebastian Evans II
- Country of origin: United States
- Original language: English
- No. of seasons: 8
- No. of episodes: 80 (list of episodes)

Production
- Executive producers: Brian A. Miller; Jennifer Pelphrey; Tramm Wigzell; Rob Sorcher
- Producers: Donna Smith; Vincent Aniceto (seasons 1–6)
- Running time: 22–23 minutes
- Production company: Cartoon Network Studios

Original release
- Network: Cartoon Network
- Release: August 1, 2012 – November 14, 2014

Related
- Ben 10 (2005–2008); Ben 10: Alien Force (2008–2010); Ben 10: Ultimate Alien (2010–2012)

Ben 10: Omniverse is an American animated television series which serves as the sequel to Ben 10: Ultimate Alien (2010–2012) and the fourth series in the Ben 10 franchise, as well as the final series to be set in the original continuity. The series aired on Cartoon Network from September 22, 2012, to November 14, 2014, in the United States, across eight 10-episode serialised "story arcs" instead of a season-based episode release structure. Man of Action Studios, consisting of Duncan Rouleau, Joe Casey, Joe Kelly, and Steven T. Seagle, created the franchise.

Ben 10: Omniverse was announced at Cartoon Network's Upfront in 2011. Concept art, described as a homage to the original Ben 10 (2005–2008) series, was first unveiled at the 2012 UK Toy Fair. The toys were designed by Derrick J. Wyatt, who was known for his work on Transformers: Animated and Scooby-Doo! Mystery Incorporated and also worked as an art director for Omniverse.

The series premiered on September 22, 2012, with a "sneak peek episode" that aired on August 1, 2012. A "sneak peek" of the series aired after "Ben 10 Week" (March 19 – March 24, 2012). A reboot series of the franchise premiered in 2016.

== Plot ==
The series follows the adventures of Ben Tennyson, wielder of the Omnitrix, an extremely powerful watch-style device that allows Ben to change into a multitude of various aliens; each with their own special abilities and skills. The storylines alternate between that of eleven-year-old Ben (one year after the original series) and sixteen-year-old Ben (a few months after Ben 10: Ultimate Alien). After Gwen leaves for college and Kevin leaves to be closer to her, Ben gets a new partner, a rookie by-the-book alien Plumber named Rook Blonko. On a mission to explore a secret underground alien city named Undertown, Ben explores the quirkier side of things in the alien underground and discovers that enemies from his past are looking for a rematch.

In "T.G.I.S.", it is revealed that the Ben 10 universe shares the same universe with The Secret Saturdays.

== Episodes ==
Story arc	Name	Episodes	Originally released	
Story arc	Name	Episodes	First released	Last released
Arc 1	A New Beginning	10	August 1, 2012	November 17, 2012
Arc 2	Malware's Revenge	10	November 24, 2012	February 2, 2013
Arc 3	Incursean Invasion	10	February 9, 2013	April 6, 2013
Arc 4	Duel of the Duplicates	10	October 5, 2013	December 7, 2013
Arc 5	Galactic Monsters	10	February 15, 2014	April 19, 2014
Arc 6	The Evil Rooters	10	October 6, 2014	October 17, 2014
Arc 7	The Mad Nightmare	10	October 20, 2014	October 31, 2014
Arc 8	The Time War	10	November 3, 2014	November 14, 2014

== Voice cast ==
=== Principal voice actors ===
- Yuri Lowenthal – Ben Tennyson (16-years-old), Feedback, XLR8, Albedo (human form), AmpFibian, Kickin Hawk, The Worst, Walkatrout, Molestache, Pesky Dust (first appearance), Hervé, Upgrade, Lt. Steel, Sumo Slammer, N-8, Alien Kid
- Bumper Robinson – Rook Blonko, Bloxx, Terraspin, Jury Rigg, Corvo, Ball Weevil, Doc Saturday, Punchinello, Crujo, Alan Albright, Parallelogram Vreedle
- Paul Eiding – Max Tennyson, Liam, Eye Guy, Blukic, Zed, Hoodlum, Ultimate Spidermonkey
- Dee Bradley Baker – Lodestar, Spidermonkey, Water Hazard, NRG, Clockwork, Nanomech, Swampfire, Big Chill, Crashhopper, Astrodactyl, Psyphon, Echo Echo, Wildvine, Caitliff, Hulex Colonel, Thirteen, The Worst, Wildmutt, Stinkfly, Acid Breath, Kraab, Slix Vigma
- Eric Bauza – Diamondhead, Eatle, Grey Matter, Upchuck, Chromastone, Driba, Dr. Psychobos, Fistrick, Megawhatt, Arctiguana, Way Big, Albedo (Galvan form), Bellicus, Pax, Solid Plugg, Ripjaws, Lackno, Mechaneer, Trombipulor, Computrons, Rook Da, Thunderpig, Commander Raff, Cast Iron, Poltroon, Ultimate Albedo, Buzzshock, Ultimate Arctiguana, Plumber Jerry, Cooper
- Corey Burton – Malware, Mr. Baumann, Brainstorm, Seebik, Fiskerton, V.V. Argost, Albedo Brainstorm, Kane North/Kangaroo Kommando
- John DiMaggio – Armodrillo, Zombozo, Bubble Helmet, Four Arms, Rath, Humungousaur, Octagon Vreedle, Vulkanus, Bullfrag, Will Harangue, Ultimate Humungousaur, Tentacle Vendor, Atomix, Whampire, Judge Domstol, Centur Squaar
- David Kaye – Khyber, Cannonbolt, Shocksquatch, Gravattack, Heatblast, Sunder, Frankenstrike, Mallice, Warlord Gar, Ultimate Gravattack, Thumbskull, Forever King Joseph Chadwick (second appearance), Lord Transyl, Deefus Veeblepister, Unitaur, Slapstrike, Exo-Skull, Skurd
- Rob Paulsen – Magister Patelliday, Rhomboid Vreedle, Ditto, Captain Kork, Tummy Head, Gorvan, Phil Billings, Gutrot
- Kevin Michael Richardson – Snare-Oh, Blitzwolfer, Emperor Milleous, Cookmeister, Sir Morton, Plumber Dispatcher
- Tara Strong – Ben Tennyson (5, 10, and 11-years-old), Pakmar, Mazuma, Natalie Alvarez, Ben Tennyson of Dimension 23, Y-It, Molly Gunther, Brown Bag, Princess Attea, Lucy Mann, Pesky Dust (later appearances), Albedo (11-year-old Ben form), ML-E (first appearance), ML-E's Mother, Duffy, Swift, Diamondhead Gwen

=== Additional voices ===
- Charlie Adler – Professor Blarney T. Hokestar, Cow Alien, Chicken Alien, Collectimus, Proctor Servantis
- Carlos Alazraqui – Rad Dudesman, Scout, Pyxi
- Aziz Ansari – Billy Billions
- René Auberjonois – Azmuth, Azmuth of Dimension 23, Intellectuary
- Diedrich Bader – Simian
- Ogie Banks – Zak Saturday
- Jeff Bennett – Kundo
- Steven Jay Blum – Vilgax, Hobble, Zs'Skayr, Ghostfreak, Professor Helena Xagliv, Bill Gacks, Addwaitya, Pa Vreedle, Thaddeus J. Collins
- Kimberly Brooks – Princess Looma, Serena, Madison, Rayona, Rook Bralla
- Bettina Bush – Kai Green
- Greg Cipes – Kevin Levin
- Jeffrey Combs – Kuphulu
- Jim Cummings – Vexx, Hulex Colonel
- Tim Curry – Forever King Joseph Chadwick (first appearance)
- Diane Delano – Ma Vreedle
- Michael Dorn – Dr. Viktor
- Dave Fennoy – Tetrax Shard of Dimension 23
- Michael Goldstrom – Benevelon
- Jennifer Hale – Rojo, Suemongousaur
- Mark Hamill – Maltruant
- Jon Heder – Clyde Fife
- Ashley Johnson – Gwen Tennyson, Margie, Wildvine Gwen, Cannonbolt Gwen, XLR8 Gwen
- Tom Kenny – Bezel
- Phil LaMarr – Jonesy
- Juliet Landau – Helen Wheels, Magistrata
- Beth Littleford – Sandra Tennyson, Isosceles Right Triangle Vreedle
- Morgan Lofting – Fistina, Yetta
- Vanessa Marshall – Drew Saturday
- David McCallum – Professor Paradox
- Edie McClurg – Vera Tennyson
- Christopher McDonald – Carl Nesmith/Captain Nemesis
- Scott Menville – Jimmy Jones, Chrono Spanner/Kenny Tennyson
- Kate Micucci – Luhley
- Miguel Nájera – Wes Green
- Judd Nelson – Ben 10,000, Eon
- Khary Payton – Manny Armstrong, Hex
- Vyvan Pham – Julie Yamamoto, Ship
- Charles Phoenix – Charles Zenith
- Tara Platt – Ester, ML-E (second appearance), J-NE, Subdora, Jennifer Nocturne
- Alexander Polinsky – Argit
- Kevin Schon – OTTO
- Dwight Schultz – Dr. Animo
- Cree Summer – Frightwig
- Tia Texada – Elena Validis
- Alanna Ubach – Rook Shar, Rook Ben
- Kari Wahlgren – Charmcaster, Viktoria
- Wil Wheaton – Darkstar, Dante
- April Winchell – Queen Voratia Rumbletum
- Gwendoline Yeo – Nyancy Chan, Sheelane

== Crew ==
- Susan Blu – Casting and voice director
- Sebastian Evans II – Composer
- Charlotte Fullerton – Story editor
- Carlos Sanches – Re-recording mixer
- Matt Wayne – Story editor
- Derrick J. Wyatt – Art director and lead character designer
- Matt Youngberg – Supervising producer

== Merchandise and other media ==
=== Home media ===
In region one, Warner Home Video have released the entire first three-story arcs and five episodes from each of story arcs four and five on five DVD sets from February 5, 2013, to September 16, 2014. The entire series is also available on digital purchase in eight separate volumes, such as complete story arcs.

Ben 10: Omniverse home video releases
Story arc		Episodes	Status	Release dates
Story arc		Episodes	Status	Region 1
1	2012	10	Completed	February 5, 2013 (1-8); July 9, 2013 (9-10)
2	2012–13	10	Completed	February 5, 2013 (12-13); July 9, 2013 (11, 14–17); November 5, 2013 (18-20)
3	2013	10	Completed	July 9, 2013 (21/22, 28); November 5, 2013 (23-27, 29); April 8, 2014 (30)
4	2013	5	Incomplete	November 5, 2013 (31); April 8, 2014 (34, 37–39)
5	2014	5	Incomplete	September 16, 2014 (41-42, 46–48)

=== Toy line ===
A toy line manufactured by Bandai was originally shown off at Toy Fairs around the world. A possible unintentional leak of official images of the line was released on the website of department store Kmart. Figures that were revealed at Toy Fairs such as Bloxx, Shocksquatch, 16-year-old Ben Tennyson, an 11-year-old version of Ben, and Rook were listed on the website. The vehicle play set, "Rook's Truck", won an award for Best Action Figures/Accessories at the 2012 London Toy Fair. The Omnitrix Touch has a gray color instead of the white it features in the show.

=== Video games ===
A video game of the same name is developed by Vicious Cycle Studios for the Wii U, Wii, PlayStation 3, Xbox 360 and by 1st Playable Productions for the Nintendo 3DS and Nintendo DS. The action beat 'em up features 15 playable characters on DS and 3DS and 16 playable characters on the other systems. It also features a two-player co-op play. The game follows Ben and Rook in a battle to defeat a fierce villain, named Malware, who has evil plans of destroying the world.

Omniverse also spawned a second video game, which was developed by High Voltage Software for the Wii U, Wii, PlayStation 3, and Xbox 360 and by 1st Playable Productions for the Nintendo 3DS. This game takes place during the events of the Frogs of War story arc, where Ben must fight the Incurseans to get back to Earth and stop Emperor Milleous, Attea, Dr. Psychobos, and the Way Bads.
