= Ben 10: Ultimate Alien =

American animated television series

- Genre: Action; Fantasy; Science fiction; Superhero; Drama
- Created by: Man of Action
- Developed by: Dwayne McDuffie; Glen Murakami
- Directed by: Dan Riba; Butch Lukic; Matt Youngberg; Andrea Romano (recording (episodes 1 & 2), voice (episodes 3–52))
- Starring: Yuri Lowenthal; Ashley Johnson; Greg Cipes; Dee Bradley Baker; John DiMaggio; Vyvan Pham; Paul Eiding; Scott Menville; Jeff Bennett; Peter Renaday; James Remar
- Theme music composer: Kristopher Carter; Michael McCuistion; Lolita Ritmanis
- Composers: Kristopher Carter; Michael McCuistion; Lolita Ritmanis
- Country of origin: United States
- Original language: English
- No. of seasons: 3
- No. of episodes: 52 (list of episodes)

Production
- Executive producers: Brian A. Miller; Jennifer Pelphrey; Tramm Wigzell; Rob Swartz (season 1); Rob Sorcher
- Producer: Donna Smith
- Editor: Tony Tedford
- Running time: 22 minutes
- Production company: Cartoon Network Studios

Original release
- Network: Cartoon Network
- Release: April 23, 2010 – March 31, 2012

Related
- Ben 10 (2005–2008); Ben 10: Alien Force (2008–2010); Generator Rex (2010–2013); Ben 10: Omniverse (2012–2014)

Ben 10: Ultimate Alien is an American animated television series created by the team Man of Action, produced by Cartoon Network Studios, and distributed by Warner Bros. Domestic Television. It is the direct sequel to Ben 10: Alien Force (2008–2010), serving as the third series in the Ben 10 franchise. The series premiered on April 23, 2010, on Cartoon Network in the US. In India and Latin America, it premiered on October 10, 2010. In Canada, the series started airing on September 12, 2010, on Teletoon.

The series finale aired on March 31, 2012, with the two-part episode "The Ultimate Enemy" dedicated to the memory of series developer, writer, and producer Dwayne McDuffie, who died during the production of the series. A sequel series, Ben 10: Omniverse, premiered in August 2012.

== Plot ==
Ben 10: Ultimate Alien begins a few weeks after the events of Ben 10: Alien Force (2008–2010). With the Prototype Omnitrix having been self-destroyed, Ben Tennyson, now sixteen years old, must learn to master the powers of the Ultimatrix, a modified version of the Omnitrix which has the ability to evolve Ben's alien forms into much more powerful versions known as "Ultimate".

The series begins with the exposure of Ben's secret identity to the world by J. Jonah "Jimmy" Jones, a young internet conspiracy theorist who deduces his identity by studying alien sightings in Ben's hometown of Bellwood. Ben's exposure polarizes public opinion, with younger fans idolizing him, and adults (particularly news anchor Will Harangue) deriding Ben as a menace to society. Ben is now forced to adjust to a new life that not only involves battling the forces of evil alongside his cousin Gwen Tennyson and his best friend Kevin Levin, but also his struggle against the pitfalls of his new-found fame.

The first season of Ultimate Alien revolves around an Osmosian villain named Aggregor, who kidnaps five powerful aliens from the Andromeda Galaxy in order to steal their powers. Although Ben and his team try to stop Aggregor, he succeeds in absorbing the aliens into himself, becoming virtually unstoppable. Ben then learns from Azmuth, the creator of the Prototype Omnitrix and Ultimatrix, that Aggregor's goal is to find the scattered pieces of the Map of Infinity, a map of spacetime which can lead him to a realm known as the Forge of Creation. Aggregor intends to enter the Forge of Creation and steal the powers of an infant Celestialsapien, a species of all-powerful, godlike aliens which can manipulate reality and time to an essentially unlimited extent with their thoughts.

Aggregor manages to reach the Forge of Creation and the team pursues him. They are nearly defeated by Aggregor, but Kevin, as a last resort, absorbs the powers of the Ultimatrix and is able to defeat Aggregor, absorbing his powers in the process. Unfortunately, the absorption of too much power overwhelms Kevin, leading him to insanity and an unquenchable thirst for more power. This leads to a stand-off between him and Ben, who, after failed attempts at tracking and saving Kevin, resolves to kill Kevin to prevent him from hurting anyone. But with the aid of Gwen, he is able to instead remove Kevin's absorbed powers, saving him and restoring the five aliens from the Andromeda Galaxy back to life.

The second season features primarily self-contained stories, including an episode in which Ben's Ultimate forms achieve sentience and attempt to free themselves from within the Ultimatrix by trapping Ben within it. Ben decides to sacrifice himself so that the Ultimates can be free; instead, the Ultimatrix recognizes his selflessness and frees both him and the Ultimates.

Both the second and third seasons of Ultimate Alien primarily focus on the Forever Knights, and particularly their leader and founder, Sir George, an immortal soldier and the origin of the myth of Saint George and the Dragon. George seeks to prevent the threat of Dagon, an extradimensional energy being which he defeated in the 12th century, which now seeks to return to Earth and take over the minds of all humans. George is killed, but Dagon himself is absorbed by Ben's old arch-nemesis Vilgax. Ben defeats Vilgax by using George's sword, a weapon built by Azmuth that is powerful enough to destroy planets, to absorb Vilgax's power into itself.

Though tempted by the sword's power to wipe out all the evil with a mere thought, Ben overcomes the temptation and returns it to Azmuth. Azmuth, impressed by Ben's exercise of self-control in the face of such strong temptation, tells Ben to give up the Ultimatrix to destroy and rewards him with an Completed Omnitrix which he says he has been working on since Ben got hold of the Prototype Omnitrix in Ben 10 (2005–2008). He then departs, telling Ben to use the Completed Omnitrix well and do the right thing.

== Episodes ==
Season	Episodes	Originally released	
Season	Episodes	First released	Last released
1	20	April 23, 2010	December 10, 2010
2	12	February 4, 2011	April 29, 2011
3	20	September 16, 2011	March 31, 2012

== Merchandise and other media ==
=== DVD releases ===
Volume	Season	Aspect ratio	Episodes	Time length	Release date
1. Ben 10: Ultimate Alien – Escape From Aggregor	1	16:9	10 (Episodes 1–10)	223 minutes	(United States) January 11, 2011 (Australia) December 1, 2010
2. Ben 10: Ultimate Alien – Power Struggle	1	16:9	10 (Episodes 11–20)	230 minutes	(United States) May 3, 2011 (Australia) April 5, 2011
3. Ben 10: Ultimate Alien – The Return of Heatblast	2	16:9	10 (Episodes 21–30)	230 minutes	(United States) August 2, 2011 (Australia) September 11, 2011
4. Ben 10: Ultimate Alien – The Wild Truth	2, 3	16:9	12 (Episodes 31–42)	276 minutes	(United States) December 6, 2011 (Australia) November 30, 2011
5. Ben 10: Ultimate Alien – The Ultimate Ending	3	16:9	10 (Episodes 43–52)	220 minutes	(United States) April 17, 2012 (Australia) March 21, 2012

=== Video games ===
Just like every other iteration of the Ben 10 series, Ultimate Alien received a video game based on its premise. The game was available on the 360, PS2, DS, PSP, Wii, and PS3.

Ben 10 Galactic Racing is available on the 360, DS, 3DS, Wii, and PS3.

=== Toys ===
Ben 10: Ultimate Alien toys were made by Bandai. They were first shown at the New York Toy Fair 2010. The first wave of the toy franchise was released in different places in the United States in spring 2010. The toys were released in Canada and the United Kingdom in the autumn of 2010. McDonald's was also selling six Ben 10: Ultimate Alien toys to promote the show.
