= Ben 10: Alien Force =

American animated television series

- Genre: Fantasy; Science fiction; Adventure; Superhero; Drama
- Created by: Man of Action
- Developed by: Dwayne McDuffie; Glen Murakami
- Directed by: Dan Riba; Butch Lukic; John Fang; Rick Morales; Andrea Romano (recording director)
- Starring: Yuri Lowenthal; Ashley Johnson; Greg Cipes; Dee Bradley Baker; Paul Eiding; Vyvan Pham; Jeff Bennett; John DiMaggio; Kevin Michael Richardson; Richard McGonagle; James Remar
- Theme music composer: Andy Sturmer
- Composers: Kristopher Carter; Michael McCuistion; Lolita Ritmanis
- Country of origin: United States
- Original language: English
- No. of seasons: 3
- No. of episodes: 46 (list of episodes)

Production
- Executive producers: Brian A. Miller; Sam Register (seasons 1–2)
- Producer: Donna Smith
- Editor: Tony Tedford
- Running time: 23 minutes
- Production company: Cartoon Network Studios

Original release
- Network: Cartoon Network
- Release: April 18, 2008 – March 26, 2010

Related
- Ben 10 (2005–2008); Ben 10: Ultimate Alien (2010–2012); Ben 10: Omniverse (2012–2014)

Ben 10: Alien Force is an American animated television series created by team Man of Action (a group consisting of Duncan Rouleau, Joe Casey, Joe Kelly, and Steven T. Seagle), and produced by Cartoon Network Studios. It is the sequel to Ben 10 (2005–2008), set five years later and taking a darker turn than its predecessor.

The series premiered on Cartoon Network in the United States on April 18, 2008, and was originally produced under the working title of Ben 10: Hero Generation. Ben 10: Alien Force ran for a total of three seasons and forty-six episodes with its final episode being aired on March 26, 2010. It was nominated for four Emmy Awards, winning one for Outstanding Sound Mixing – Live Action and Animation.

A sequel series, Ben 10: Ultimate Alien, was released in 2010.

== Premise ==
Five years after the events of Ben 10 (2005–2008), Ben Tennyson, now a teenager, once again joins the Prototype Omnitrix to protect Earth and other parts of the universe from villainous alien activity. The Omnitrix itself, a wristwatch-shaped device, allows Ben to transform into numerous alien forms, thereby inheriting the unique abilities of that alien race.

== Characters ==
- Benjamin "Ben" Kirby Tennyson (voiced by Yuri Lowenthal)

At the age of 15, Ben fills the role of leader after Grandpa Max mysteriously disappears. The powerful Prototype Omnitrix has reconfigured, giving him access to a new set of alien heroes that are much stronger and more powerful than those in the original series. Over the past five years, Ben has matured dramatically and gained strength, leadership and wisdom.

- Gwendolyn "Gwen" Tennyson (voiced by Ashley Johnson)

At the age of 15, Ben's cousin Gwen is much more skilled with her innate magical powers. She is able to create, control, and manipulate magical energies that she can mold into various shapes and forms such as ropes and bridges, solid projectiles and shields, and stepping stones for quick traversal of dangerous areas. She is not nearly as fiery or short-tempered as she was in the original series, and she shows a much more concerned and caring attitude toward her cousin.

- Kevin Ethan Levin (voiced by Greg Cipes)

A former nemesis of Ben, Kevin now works as an alien tech dealer. He unintentionally gets involved in the Highbreed plot and joins Ben out of a desire to make up for his actions. He has the ability to absorb the properties of any solid matter he touches--like rock or steel--providing him greater strength and protection in battle.

- Julie Yamamoto (voiced by Vyvan Pham)

Julie is Ben's love interest and girlfriend. She enjoys tennis, eating chili fries, and caring for her pet, Ship (an alien Galvanic Mechomorph found by her and Ben).

- Max Tennyson (voiced by Paul Eiding)

Max is a semi-retired member of the Plumbers--an interplanetary law enforcement group--and Ben and Gwen's paternal grandfather. He disappears while investigating the Highbreed plot, leaving only a few cryptic messages for Ben to find. He is briefly reunited with his grandchildren in "Max Out" but sacrifices himself to destroy a Highbreed factory at the end of the episode (transporting himself to the Null Void). In the episode "Voided", Ben and Max reunite in the Null Void, and he promises Ben that he'll come back soon. He eventually returns in the second season finale of the show to aid Ben in his final assault against the Highbreed.

- Highbreed

The Highbreed believe themselves to be the purest and most powerful of all species and intend to cleanse the galaxy of impure lower life forms. It is later revealed that they were dying out, having become sterile and vulnerable to disease due to heavy inbreeding and that they intend to destroy the rest of the universe.

- DNAliens

These human-Xenocyte hybrids are alien drones that serve the Highbreed. The DNAliens are able to disguise themselves as humans using special identity masks called ID Masks.

- The Forever Knights

A paramilitary organization that has worked in secret since their formation in the Middle Ages, Forever Knights steal and then trade alien technology with anyone who is willing to pay large amounts of money.

- Vilgax (voiced by James Remar)

Ben's most formidable arch-nemesis from the original series, Vilgax is an alien warlord set on conquering the universe. His desire is to take Ben's Prototype Omnitrix and use it to further his goal. While not present in the first two seasons, he returns in season three with new powers and abilities. He loses to Ben in the episode "Vengeance of Vilgax" and is banished from Earth, though he swears vengeance. Keeping his promise, Vilgax returns in the episode "The Final Battle" to procure the Omnitrix and destroy Ben, but is unsuccessful.

- Albedo (voiced by Yuri Lowenthal)

Albedo is a young and arrogant Galvan. A former assistant to Azmuth, the creator of the Prototype Omnitrix, Albedo asked for an Omnitrix of his own. When Azmuth refused, Albedo built one himself of inferior quality and synchronized it to work exactly like Ben's. Instead of being able to control the transformations himself, however, because Ben's device was the default, Albedo was transformed into a clone of Ben, even developing many of Ben's habits, which he considers utterly repulsive and has a craving for chili fries. Albedo's goal is to steal Ben's Omnitrix to return to his original form.

== Themes ==
Ben 10: Alien Force is set five years after the original series. The second series is quite different from the first one: the storyline is notable for having matured the characters and taken a darker tone with more complex plots, more characters dying, and much less humor. The original logo has changed from the original series. This change received mixed reactions from the fans, and caused a division among them. Despite this, Ben 10: Alien Force's ratings were successful, allowing the production of Ben 10: Ultimate Alien, taking place one year later.

=== The evolved Omnitrix ===
When the Omnitrix recalibrated, it gained a more watch-style shape, a green wristband, and became smaller and sleeker with the face plate becoming black and green. The inside of the hourglass shape on the face now glows in different colors at special moments; these colors signify the state that the Omnitrix is in. The display mode of alien-shaped black silhouettes printed on the face is replaced by a dark green 3D hologram hovering above the watch, giving a more detailed look of the selected alien.

The new Omnitrix also functions as a Plumber's badge which is used in the series as a communicator, a detector of other Plumber's badges, an alien-language translator, and as a key for accessing the Extranet, an intergalactic Internet.

In the original series, the reason Azmuth invented the Omnitrix was for all the beings of the universe to better understand each other. It was revealed in Ben 10: Alien Force that there was another reason for the creation of the Omnitrix. Azmuth tells Ben that the Omnitrix was invented to preserve the DNA of all living beings in the Milky Way and restore them if they should ever become extinct.

== Episodes ==
Season	Episodes	Originally released	
Season	Episodes	First released	Last released
1	13	April 18, 2008	August 31, 2008
2	13	October 10, 2008	March 27, 2009
3	20	September 11, 2009	March 26, 2010

== International telecast ==
Ben 10: Alien Force premiered on Teletoon in Canada on September 6, 2008, and is telecast in 32 languages.

Language	Country	Title	Broadcast
English	United States	Ben 10: Alien Force	Cartoon Network (United States)
English	Canada	Ben 10: Alien Force	Teletoon
Hindi	India	Ben 10: Alien Force	Cartoon Network (India)
Arabic	Arabic countries	بن 10: إليين فورس	Cartoon Network (Arabic) MBC 3 (formerly) Ajyal TV (formerly) Qatar TV (formerly)
Bulgarian	Bulgaria	Бен 10: Извънземна сила	Cartoon Network (Southeastern European)
Czech	Slovakia	Ben 10: Síla vesmíru	Barrandov Studios

== Media ==
=== DVD releases ===
Region 1 releases

DVD title	Season	Aspect ratio	Episode count	Time length	Release date
Ben 10: Alien Force Volume 1	Season One	4:3	5	110 minutes	October 21, 2008
Ben 10: Alien Force Volume 2	Season One	4:3	4	88 minutes	January 13, 2009
Ben 10: Alien Force Volume 3	Season One	4:3	4	88 minutes	April 7, 2009
Ben 10: Alien Force Volume 4	Season Two	16:9	5	113 minutes	September 1, 2009
Ben 10: Alien Force Volume 5	Season Two	16:9	4	90 minutes	November 17, 2009
Ben 10: Alien Force Volume 6	Season Two	16:9	4	90 minutes	March 30, 2010
Ben 10: Alien Force Volume 7	Season Three	16:9	7	159 minutes	June 29, 2010
Ben 10: Alien Force Volume 8	Season Three	16:9	6	136 minutes	August 24, 2010
Ben 10: Alien Force Volume 9	Season Three	16:9	7	180 minutes	October 5, 2010

Region 4 releases

DVD title	Season	Aspect ratio	Episode count	Time length	Release date
Ben 10: Alien Force Volume 1	Season One	4:3	5	115 minutes	03 December 2008
Ben 10: Alien Force Volume 2	Season One	4:3	4	88 minutes	03 March 2009
Ben 10: Alien Force Volume 3	Season One	4:3	4	88 minutes	06 May 2009
Ben 10: Alien Force Volume 4	Season Two	4:3	5	110 minutes	
Ben 10: Alien Force Volume 5	Season Two	4:3	4	88 minutes	
Ben 10: Alien Force Volume 6	Season Two	4:3	4	88 minutes	
Ben 10: Alien Force Volume 7	Season Three	4:3	5	110 minutes	
Ben 10: Alien Force Volume 8	Season Three	4:3	4	88 minutes	
Ben 10: Alien Force Volume 9	Season Three	4:3	5	110 minutes	
Ben 10: Alien Force Volume 10	Season Three	4:3	4	85 minutes	
Ben 10: Alien Force – Vengeance of Vilgax	Season Three	4:3	2	45 minutes	
Ben 10: Alien Force – Season 1	Season One	4:3	13	286 minutes	June 1, 2011
Ben 10: Alien Force – Season 2	Season Two	4:3	13	286 minutes	June 1, 2011
Ben 10: Alien Force – Season 3	Season Three	4:3	10	220 minutes	June 1, 2011
Ben 10: Alien Force – Season 4	Season Three	4:3	10	220 minutes	June 1, 2011

=== Ben 10: Alien Swarm ===
Ben 10: Alien Swarm is a live-action film based on the series, announced by Cartoon Network at their 2008 upfront. It is a sequel to Ben 10: Race Against Time. The first teaser trailer was shown on October 3, 2008, during the premiere of Star Wars: The Clone Wars, a full trailer was shown after the season 2 finale on March 27, 2009, and another full trailer, this time showing a preview of Humongousaur, was shown during the season 3 premiere on September 11, 2009. The film aired on November 25, 2009.

Again directed by Alex Winter, the film's cast included Ryan Kelley as Ben, Nathan Keyes as Kevin, and Galadriel Stineman as Gwen. Lee Majors was offered to reprise his role as Grandpa Max, but he turned it down; the role was recast with Barry Corbin. The film also featured Alyssa Diaz as a new character named Elena, who was a childhood friend of Ben. The aliens seen were Big Chill, Humongousaur, and a new alien named Nanomech. In the movie, Kevin's car was a green Dodge Challenger.

==== Sequels ====
After Ben 10: Alien Force, there were 2 more sequels that came out, which are Ben 10: Ultimate Alien and Ben 10: Omniverse.

=== Video games ===
A total of three games based on Ben 10: Alien Force were produced: Ben 10 Alien Force: The Game, Ben 10 Alien Force: Vilgax Attacks, and Ben 10 Alien Force: The Rise of Hex. Characters from the Ben 10 series also made appearances in Cartoon Network's MMO, FusionFall.

=== Comics ===
Ben 10: Alien Force has been featured in Cartoon Network Action Pack!, an anthology comic book series published by DC Comics, since issue #27 (September 2008 cover date). It normally alternates bi-monthly with The Secret Saturdays as the lead story.

Ben 10: Alien Force stories have been published in Cartoon Network Action Pack! #27, 28, 31, 33, 35, 37, 38, 41, 42, and 43.

Ben 10: Alien Force: Doom Dimension is a two-part graphic novel series published by Del Rey Books, written by Peter David, and illustrated by Dan Hipp.

=== Books ===
Scholastic Books has published a number of books based on the series, including a collection of chapter books written by Charlotte Fullerton, who has written several episodes for the show.

=== Lego toys ===
Lego Ben 10: Alien Force
- Subject: Ben 10: Alien Force buildable figures
- Licensed from: Cartoon Network
- Availability: January 2010–December 2010
- Total sets: 6
- Characters: Swampfire, Big Chill, Humongousaur, Jetray, Chromastone and Spidermonkey
- Official website

Lego Ben 10: Alien Force (stylized as LEGO Ben 10: Alien Force) is a discontinued Lego theme based on the animated television series Ben 10: Alien Force of the same name. It is licensed from Cartoon Network. There were the total of six sets of buildable figures similar to Bionicle. The theme was first introduced in January 2010. The product line was discontinued by the end of 2010 and replaced with the Hero Factory in 2010.

==== Overview ====
Lego Ben 10: Alien Force was based on Ben 10: Alien Force animated television show. The product line focuses on Ben Tennyson's powerful alien forms with various abilities. Lego Ben 10: Alien Force aimed to recreate the main characters in Lego buildable figures, including Spidermonkey, Swampfire, Chromastone, Humungousaur, Jet Ray and Big Chill. Each of the sets included the Bionicle parts and allows children to build an action figure version of one of Ben's alien forms.

==== Development ====
Lego Ben 10: Alien Force was inspired by Ben 10: Alien Force TV series. The Lego construction toy range was based on the animated TV series and developed in collaboration with Cartoon Network Enterprises. The construction sets were designed to recreate the story and characters of the animated TV series in Lego form.

==== Launch ====
Lego Ben 10: Alien Force theme was launched at the American International Toy Fair in 2010. The Lego Group had a partnership with Cartoon Network. As part of the marketing campaign, The Lego Group released six sets based on Ben 10: Alien Force. The six sets were Spidermonkey, Swampfire, Chromastone, Humungousaur, Jet Ray and Big Chill. The toy sets are marketed at children aged 5 to 12 years old.

==== Construction sets ====
According to BrickLink, The Lego Group released a total of 6 Lego sets as part of Lego Ben 10: Alien Force theme. It was discontinued by the end of 2010.

===== Spidermonkey =====
Spidermonkey (set number: 8409) was released on 1 January 2010 and based on the Ben 10: Alien Force character of Spidermonkey. The set consists of 21 pieces. The set measures over 8" (22 cm) tall.

===== Swampfire =====
Swampfire (set number: 8410) was released on 1 January 2010 and based on the Ben 10: Alien Force character of Swampfire. The set consists of 22 pieces and measures 9" (23 cm) tall.

===== Chromastone =====
Chromastone (set number: 8411) was released on 1 January 2010 and based on the Ben 10: Alien Force character of Chromastone. The set consists of 21 pieces and measures 9" (23 cm) tall.

===== Humungousaur =====
Humungousaur (set number: 8517) was released on 1 January 2010 and based on the Ben 10: Alien Force character of Humungousaur. The set consists of 14 pieces and measures 9" (23 cm) tall.

===== Jet Ray =====
Jet Ray (set number: 8518) was released on 1 January 2010 and based on the Ben 10: Alien Force character of Jet Ray. The set consists of 16 pieces and measures 9" (23 cm) tall.

===== Big Chill =====
Big Chill (set number: 8519) was released on 1 January 2010 and based on the Ben 10: Alien Force character of Big Chill. The set consists of 20 pieces and measures over 8" (22 cm) tall.
