= Ben 10: Alien Force – Vilgax Attacks =

2009 video game

- North American Xbox 360 box art
- Developers: Papaya Studio (Xbox 360, Wii, PS2, PSP); 1st Playable Productions (DS)
- Publisher: D3 Publisher
- Writer: Charlotte Fullerton
- Composers: Mark Watters; Robert Irving
- Series: Ben 10
- Platforms: Nintendo DS, PlayStation 2, PlayStation Portable, Wii, Xbox 360
- Release: NA: October 27, 2009; EU: March 12, 2010
- Genre: Action
- Mode: Single-player

Ben 10: Alien Force – Vilgax Attacks is the third game in the Ben 10 video game series, and the second game to be based on the Ben 10: Alien Force series. The first game was based on the first two seasons of the series, while Vilgax Attacks is based on the third and final season. It was released on October 27, 2009.

== Plot ==
The story starts as Vilgax invades Earth with a gigantic Null Void projector. To help save the Earth, Professor Paradox sends Ben Tennyson, Gwen Tennyson, and Kevin Levin back in time to stop Vilgax from collecting a power source for his Null Void projector. With help from Max Tennyson and Ship, Ben and company travel throughout the galaxy to foil Vilgax's plan before it can come to fruition.

== Gameplay ==
The game is based on the Cartoon Network series of the same name, which has as its main character Ben Tennyson, a young man who, during his summer vacation, finds an alien device called the Omnitrix. This special watch allows Ben to transform into a variety of aliens, each with unique abilities and powers.

Gameplay consists of action and puzzle-solving that revolves around the skills of alien forms. Ben can perform various combinations and special attacks using different aliens. By defeating enemies and collecting glowing energy spheres, Ben can acquire new abilities. However, each form's inherent abilities consume energy from Ben's Omnitrix meter, which must be recharged before he can use them again.

== Development ==
The game was announced by D3 Publisher in May 2009 for a release in North America that fall. It would be released for the same systems as its predecessor titles, but now also including the Xbox 360.

== Reception ==
Reception

Aggregate score
Aggregator	Score
Metacritic	(Xbox 360) 61/100 (Wii) 65/100

Review scores
Publication	Score
GameZone	7.8/10
IGN	7/10
Official Xbox Magazine (US)	7/10

Vilgax Attacks received "mixed or average" reviews, according to review aggregator website Metacritic.
