= Samurai Jack season 5 =

Season of television series

Samurai Jack
- Season 5
- DVD cover
- Starring: Phil LaMarr; Greg Baldwin; Tara Strong
- No. of episodes: 10

Release
- Original network: Adult Swim
- Original release: March 11 – May 20, 2017

Season chronology
- ← Previous; Season 4

The fifth and final season of Samurai Jack, an American animated series, premiered on Adult Swim's Toonami programming block on March 11, 2017, and concluded its run on May 20, 2017. The announcement of the season came in December 2015, eleven years since the series was originally concluded on Cartoon Network. Genndy Tartakovsky, the series' creator, returned as a director, writer, and storyboarder for this season. Set approximately 50 years after the original four seasons, it follows the titular character, who has not biologically aged in this time, as he aimlessly wanders the Earth with his sword lost and seemingly no remaining means of returning to his native time to destroy the demon Aku, who sent him to the distant future in the series premiere. His hope is gradually restored when he convinces Ashi, an assassin from an all-female Aku-worshipping cult, to join his cause.

The season was praised for its visuals, intensity, darker, and more mature tone, as well as its satisfying conclusion to the series.

== Plot ==
Fifty years have passed, but I do not age. Time has lost its effect on me. Yet the suffering continues. Aku's grasp chokes the past, present, and future. Hope is lost. Got to get back – back to the past. Samurai Jack.

— Jack, in the opening sequence

The fifth season of the series takes place 50 years after the original four seasons, although Jack himself has stopped aging as a side effect of time travel. Aku has destroyed all existing time portals but is distressed over the prospect of battling Jack forever, so he has stopped pursuing him directly. Jack's heroic actions have inspired many to oppose Aku's tyranny, among them the now-elderly Scotsman, who unsuccessfully leads armies in a battle against Aku and is killed by him but returns as the spirit of his younger self. Unknown to Aku, Jack has lost his sword, and is troubled by hallucinations of his deceased family, his former self, and Aku's numerous victims, almost to the point of suicide.

A set of fraternal septuplet girls are born to the high priestess of a cult of female Aku worshipers, the "Daughters of Aku", and raised as assassins with the sole purpose of killing Jack. They find and overwhelm Jack, but he later kills all but one of them, Ashi, the eldest. In the bowels of a monster that swallows them both, Jack saves her from various dangers, attempting to convince her of Aku's evil. Deciding to accompany Jack, Ashi comes to see the truth of Jack's words, and helps him through his emotional and spiritual journey, preventing a suicide attempt and helping him reclaim his sword. Following a battle alongside each other, they become romantically involved.

Aku eventually learns that Jack lost his sword and confronts him, but retreats when he sees Jack has his sword without learning he recovered it in the interim. Aku then senses his essence within Ashi, and, recalling a time when he visited the Daughters of Aku and left some of his essence in a goblet, realizes that the High Priestess drank and became impregnated by it, making Ashi literally his daughter. He seizes control of her in order to attack Jack. Jack refuses to kill Ashi and lays down his sword in defeat. Aku takes Jack prisoner and prepares to kill him, but everyone Jack has helped throughout his journey rallies to his defense. Jack admits to Ashi he loves her, enabling her to regain control of herself. She returns the sword to Jack and uses demonic powers she inherited from Aku to time travel with Jack to the moment when Aku sent Jack to the future, whereupon Jack destroys the weakened Aku for good. With peace restored, Ashi and Jack prepare to marry, but on her way to the altar, she suddenly collapses, as slaying Aku invalidates her existence, causing her to fade away.

The series ends with a grieving Jack smiling when he watches a ladybug land on his hand and then fly free in a grove of blossoming sakura trees.

== Development ==
=== Background ===
Created by Genndy Tartakovsky, Samurai Jack originally aired on Cartoon Network from 2001 to 2004, comprising four seasons. The series follows a young samurai (voiced by Phil LaMarr) who is cast into the future by the evil shape-shifting demon Aku (voiced originally by Mako, Greg Baldwin (fifth season)) mere moments before defeating the demon. He adopts the name Jack and continues his fight in the dystopian future ruled by Aku. Jack seeks to find a portal back to his time but is constantly thwarted by the demon's forces. The series was left open-ended after the conclusion of the fourth season. Tartakovsky previously expressed interest in a film adaptation of the series to provide a genuine conclusion, but the project never materialized.

=== Production ===
"Technology is different, we're using computers now,
instead of hamsters like the old days."

— Craig Kellman, character designer, Behind the Scenes featurette

Starting in 2014, reruns of Samurai Jack were aired on Toonami, an action-oriented programming block on Adult Swim. Within two weeks of Tartakovsky's first communication with executive Mike Lazzo, a deal was reached for 10 more episodes of the series. The network released a short teaser in December 2015 after it green-lit the return of the series with Genndy Tartakovsky as executive producer and Cartoon Network Studios as the season's production company. Artwork used in the teaser derived from the cover of an issue from IDW Publishing's comic book adaptation of the series. The new season received further mention ahead of the network's 2016 upfront press release. The fifth season was announced for the 2016–17 television season. Work-in-progress excerpts were shared at the 2016 Annecy International Animated Film Festival. According to Tartakovsky, having a small production team allowed for a smaller budget, faster schedule, and greater creative freedom for the team, and executive producer Mike Lazzo gave the team a free hand, with minimal intervention in the production. Changes in television animation storytelling since the cartoon's original series allowed the show to shift from episodic storytelling, where each episode is more or less independent from the others, to one cohesive serialized story that will conclude Jack's journey. The serialized format allows every episode to have a "reveal" that takes the show in a different direction. The final episode was storyboarded in October 2016, and Tartakovsky expressed hope it would have a very emotional impact on the audience. All the original Samurai Jack episodes are designated by Roman numerals, and the original series ended with episode "LII" (52). Season five opens with episode "XCII" (92); the jump in numbering signifies the elapsed time from the last episode of season four.

=== Casting ===
Phil LaMarr reprises his role as Jack, and John DiMaggio reprises his role as the Scotsman, a fan-favorite ally of Jack's. Sab Shimono reprises his role as the Emperor, Jack's unnamed father who originally vanquished Aku. Due to the death of Mako, who originally voiced Aku, Tartakovsky at first considered using a completely different voice for the character. However, considering how Mako's voice was an important element of the character, voice actor Greg Baldwin was brought in to mimic the original voice. Baldwin had previously served as Mako's replacement for the voice of Iroh during the final season of Avatar: The Last Airbender and the second and third seasons of The Legend of Korra. Tara Strong and Tom Kenny, who guest starred in the previous seasons, respectively voice the season's recurring characters Ashi and Scaramouche.

== Themes ==
The season explores the hero's journey and the identity of the hero when his journey stagnates. Choice and lack of choice are explored: in Jack's introspections and actions; in the actions of Jack's enemies; in the contrast between humans who choose their actions and machines which are programmed; and in destiny and fate which offer no choice. Of the distinction and parallel between robots and humans, Tartakovsky said: "I wanted to show the human side that's been treated like a machine. Aku builds robots and all these robots are singularly programmed to kill Jack. What if it's humans? What if the one purpose in your whole life is to kill this one person and you're raised from birth that way?" Angelica Jade Bastién of New York magazine writes that there is a "distinctive undercurrent of loneliness stretching through the series from start to finish." Jack is often alone, dwarfed by the "grand solemnity of nature." He has lost his home and his relationship with his family, and in the final episode he loses his relationship with the woman he is about to marry.

== Cast ==
- Phil LaMarr – Samurai Jack, Host, Frog, Mad Jack, additional voices
- Greg Baldwin – Aku, additional voices
- Tara Strong – Ashi, Avi, Vision, additional voices
- Grey Griffin – High Priestess, Flora, Olivia
- Sab Shimono – The Emperor
- Lauren Tom – Mother
- Tom Kenny – Scaramouche, Chritchellite
- Kari Wahlgren – Ami, Aki, additional voices
- Chris Parnell – Mud Alien, Scientist
- Keone Young – Bandit, Monk
- Corey Burton – Crow
- John DiMaggio – Scotsman
- Aaron LaPlante – Dominator, The Omen
- Kevin Michael Richardson – Woolie #1, Demongo
- Keegan-Michael Key – Da' Samurai
- Daran Norris – additional voices
- Billy West – additional voices
- Rob Paulsen – Sir Rothchild (credited as a Dog)
- Jeff Glen Bennett – additional voices
- Mako – Past Aku (via archived recording) (Note: In the series finale, Aku's original opening narration, provided by Mako, is used during a television broadcast before Aku announces he has captured Jack and his sword.)

== Episodes ==
No. overall	No. in season	Title	Directed by	Storyboarded and Written by	Story by	Original release date	US viewers (millions)
53	1	"XCII"	Genndy Tartakovsky	Bryan Andrews and Genndy Tartakovsky	Darrick Bachman, Bryan Andrews, and Genndy Tartakovsky	March 11, 2017	1.55
Approximately fifty years after losing his sword, Jack has not aged as a side effect of time travel. He has given up hope of returning to his time with no time portals left in existence, and he is tormented by hallucinations of his deceased parents, his kingdom, and a mysterious armored figure on horseback. Jack, now using futuristic weapons and robotic samurai armor, rescues a mother and her two children from a beetle drone army, and wanders the land on a motorcycle. Scaramouche—a fast-talking musical assassin robot styled after Sammy Davis Jr.—has destroyed a village and killed its people to get Jack's attention. Jack delays in arriving to the village but still defeats Scaramouche and takes one of his weapons. Meanwhile, seven septuplet sisters are raised and trained from birth by the "Daughters of Aku", an Aku-worshiping cult led by an unnamed High Priestess, their mother, to become a team of assassins with the sole purpose of killing Jack for Aku.
54	2	"XCIII"	Genndy Tartakovsky	Bryan Andrews and Genndy Tartakovsky	Darrick Bachman, Bryan Andrews, and Genndy Tartakovsky	March 18, 2017	1.30
Unaware that Jack has lost his sword, Aku is starting to give up hope of ever defeating Jack, especially since he has stopped aging. Elsewhere, the Daughters of Aku septuplets overwhelm and disarm Jack. While hiding from them, he hallucinates an argument with himself about the point of keeping on living and fighting. He flees to a nearby temple ruin, pursued by the septuplets. One of them stabs him in the side as he kills her, and he discovers they are human, not robots as he assumed. Jack uses Scaramouche's tuning fork-like dagger to make the temple walls explode, and escapes into a river flowing past it. The episode's climax is an homage to the musical composition "The Ecstasy of Gold", originally featured in the film The Good, the Bad and the Ugly.
55	3	"XCIV"	Genndy Tartakovsky	David Krentz and Genndy Tartakovsky	Darrick Bachman, Bryan Andrews, and Genndy Tartakovsky	March 25, 2017	1.35
Jack floats downriver and takes shelter in a cave, while the six surviving sisters track him. He hallucinates an argument with himself over whether he can kill them all if necessary as he had never before killed a human. A wounded wolf who had previously battled tiger-like creatures joins Jack, and they bond as they recuperate from their injuries. Jack recalls a childhood incident where his father gave assassins accosting his family a choice: leave, or "face your destiny". They attacked, and Jack's father killed them. As the sisters follow remnants of Jack's blood and close in on him, he gives them the same choice, echoing his father's words. When they stay, he quickly kills three and lures the others onto a branch hanging over an abyss. One by one, Jack drops them into the abyss, but before he can return to solid ground, the branch breaks, and he too falls into the abyss.
56	4	"XCV"	Genndy Tartakovsky	Genndy Tartakovsky	Darrick Bachman, Bryan Andrews, and Genndy Tartakovsky	April 8, 2017	1.33
Jack awakens and finds the last surviving septuplet sister, Ashi, lying bloodied in the snow. He quickly prevents an attack from her and binds her with the chain from her own chain-sickle. They are both suddenly swallowed by an enormous creature. On the way down into the creature's digestive system, Ashi again attacks Jack, but he saves her from falling to her death. Jack hallucinates an argument with himself over saving Ashi or leaving her to die. He protects her from various monsters and carries her with him despite her ongoing threats and attempts to kill him. With help from flying beings, they make it out of the creature and into a body of water, where Jack saves Ashi from drowning and carries her to a small island. She prepares to attack him again, but relents and drops her sickle upon seeing, in contrast to the High Priestess, who once crushed a ladybug for not being "a part of Aku's order", Jack gently release a ladybug that landed on his hand.
57	5	"XCVI"	Genndy Tartakovsky	Bryan Andrews and Genndy Tartakovsky	Darrick Bachman, Bryan Andrews, and Genndy Tartakovsky	April 15, 2017	1.29
Jack's longtime friend the Scotsman, a now elderly wheelchair user, leads an attack on Aku's tower. Aku easily obliterates two of the three assembled rebel armies. The Scotsman stalls Aku, taunting him over his fear of facing Jack, to allow his army of daughters to retreat. Aku kills him, but the magic Celtic runes on his broken claymore allow him to return as a specter in his youthful prime. He then instructs his daughters to regroup for another day of battle and assemble a larger army to find Jack and destroy Aku. Elsewhere, Ashi has a troubling vision of the High Priestess, who frowns upon Ashi's insubordination. Ashi asks Jack to prove his claims of Aku's evil nature. They journey to several places destroyed by Aku and come upon a razed village whose children have been taken by the Dominator, a human in robotic armor, to a factory and turned evil by a mind-control device. While Jack fights the children, Ashi destroys the Dominator and the device. Jack is horrified to see the children collapse, believing them to be dead. The mysterious horseman appears, and Jack willingly follows. Ashi arrives as the children start coming to, and finds that Jack is gone.
58	6	"XCVII"	Genndy Tartakovsky	Genndy Tartakovsky	Darrick Bachman, Bryan Andrews, and Genndy Tartakovsky	April 22, 2017	1.33
As Ashi searches for Jack, she comes across many grateful people that Jack had helped in the past. She also meets defeated enemies who now respect Jack at a bar tended by Da' Samurai, a former samurai wannabe humbled by Jack. Along her search, she sheds her suit of black ash and forges a floral outfit. A mysterious cloaked woman helps Ashi find Jack in a graveyard surrounded by the spirits of great warriors. The horseman haunting Jack, the Omen, announces that Jack must face the consequences of his failure or be dishonored. Jack prepares to commit seppuku, while the Omen attacks Ashi to keep her from interfering. She pleads to Jack not to lose hope and tells him of all the lives he saved, including her own. Upon learning the children formerly enslaved by the Dominator are still alive, Jack regains some confidence and destroys the specter, then tells Ashi they must find his sword. Meanwhile, Scaramouche, whom Jack reduced to a talking head, sets out to inform Aku that Jack lost his sword. He sneaks onto a boat but is thrown overboard by anthropomorphic dog passengers for insulting them.
59	7	"XCVIII"	Genndy Tartakovsky	Bryan Andrews and Genndy Tartakovsky	Darrick Bachman, Bryan Andrews, and Genndy Tartakovsky	April 29, 2017	1.30
In a flashback at a ruined mountaintop temple, Jack jumps into the last time portal in existence when Aku pulls him out and destroys it. Angrily, Jack kills three small rams transformed into monsters by Aku. Traumatized after killing innocent creatures, Jack drops his sword, which falls into the deep pit where the portal was. In the present, Jack and Ashi return to the temple aboard a giant bird and explore the pit but cannot find the sword. Concluding that the sword abandoned him, Jack meditates to determine its whereabouts. Ashi defends Jack from enemy orc soldiers and the High Priestess, killing her with an arrow. Jack's meditation takes him on an astral journey to an old monk, who tells him after a tea ceremony that he has lost his sense of balance. Jack realizes his anger, which manifests as the spirit of his evil counterpart Mad Jack, has kept him from finding the sword; relinquishing it, he is transported to a heavenly realm where the gods Ra, Rama and Odin restore his original appearance and return his sword, now further empowered by his own spirit. After Jack returns to the physical world, he and Ashi set out to confront Aku.
60	8	"XCIX"	Genndy Tartakovsky	Genndy Tartakovsky	Darrick Bachman, Bryan Andrews, and Genndy Tartakovsky	May 6, 2017	1.36
A spaceship is knocked off course by an asteroid and crashes on Earth. Elsewhere, Jack and Ashi travel together and board a giant, camel-like beast that carries passengers across the desert. The other passengers attack them, so the two escape and continue traveling on foot. They get caught in a sandstorm and find shelter in the crashed spaceship, where thousands of leech-like creatures band together as a monstrosity dubbed "Lazarus-92" and pursue them. They come upon a weapon designed specifically to counter Lazarus but do not know how to operate it. Jack and Ashi fight the horde and are almost completely engulfed before Jack activates the device, electrocuting the creatures. After Jack and Ashi recuperate, they passionately kiss as Dean Martin's "Everybody Loves Somebody" starts playing and continues through the end credits.
61	9	"C"	Genndy Tartakovsky	Bryan Andrews and Genndy Tartakovsky	Darrick Bachman, Bryan Andrews, and Genndy Tartakovsky	May 13, 2017	1.33
Ashi bonds with Jack as he tells her of his life before Aku. During the night, Jack ventures off alone, and by day happens upon the ruins of a time portal he was prophesied to use, as well as the broken glasses of the Guardian he unsuccessfully fought. Ashi catches up to Jack, who explains he left her behind out of fear of losing her to Aku as he did many others. Ashi reassures him that, together, they will defeat Aku. Aku suddenly appears with Scaramouche, who has finally informed him about Jack losing his sword and had his body restored as a reward. Upon seeing Jack has his sword, Aku swiftly destroys Scaramouche and starts to leave, but he senses himself inside of Ashi. He recalls visiting the Daughters of Aku and leaving some of his essence in a goblet, then assumes the High Priestess must have drunk it and given birth to her seven children, making Ashi literally his daughter. Aku possesses and transforms Ashi, forcing her to fight Jack. When Jack wounds Ashi, she briefly comes back to her senses and begs Jack to kill her. Unwilling to do so, Jack lays down his sword in defeat, which Aku then holds up triumphantly.
62	10	"CI"	Genndy Tartakovsky	Bryan Andrews and Genndy Tartakovsky	Darrick Bachman, Bryan Andrews, and Genndy Tartakovsky	May 20, 2017	1.46
On a global television broadcast, Aku reprises his opening narration from the last four seasons, then announces he has captured Jack and his sword. Before Ashi can kill the samurai, many of Jack's allies arrive and assault Aku and his fortress. After they free Jack, Aku overpowers them, and Ashi prevents him from recovering his sword. Jack finds Ashi's true form inside her demonic body and frees her from Aku's possession by telling her that he loves her. Ashi argues with Aku and discovers she has inherited his powers, using them to retrieve Jack's sword and send herself and Jack back in time to the moment right after Aku first flung Jack into the future. Jack finally destroys Aku and his tower, and Ashi feels Aku's essence leave her. Jack and Ashi prepare to get married, but as Ashi walks the aisle, she suddenly collapses and fades away, informing Jack with her last breath that Aku's demise invalidates her existence. Jack goes off alone to grieve in a dark forest but finds closure as he watches a ladybug land on his hand and fly away. Jack softly smiles, as the sun shines overhead, revealing that the forest is full of cherry blossom trees in bloom.

== Broadcast ==
On January 24, 2017, Adult Swim announced in an interstitial bumper that the show would debut on March 11, 2017. The first three episodes of the season were screened at the Ace Hotel Los Angeles two days before the season's television premiere. An unannounced change in schedule on April Fools' Day supplanted a new Samurai Jack episode with the premiere of the third season of Rick and Morty, which aired repeatedly from 8 PM to midnight ET.

== Home media ==
This season is available in HD and SD for digital purchase on iTunes, Google Play, Amazon Video, Microsoft Store, Vudu, and PlayStation Store.

=== Full season release ===
The full season set was released on DVD and Blu-ray on October 17, 2017. In Australia it was released by Madman Entertainment

Samurai Jack: The Complete Fifth Season
Set details	Special features	
10 episodes; 2-disc set; 1.78:1 aspect ratio; Subtitles: English; English (Dolby 5.1 Surround)	The Evolution of Jack; Pitch Movies	
DVD release dates
Region 1	Region 2	Region 4
October 17, 2017	N/A	Unknown 2018
Blu-ray release dates
Region A		Region B
October 17, 2017		N/A

== Reception ==
On review aggregator website Rotten Tomatoes, the season holds an approval rating of 100% based on 23 reviews, with an average rating of 9.1/10, with the critics' consensus reading: "An increasing intensity and maturity are evident in Samurai Jack's beautifully animated, action-packed and overall compelling fifth season". On Metacritic the season has an average score of 94 out of 100, based on 6 critics, indicating "universal acclaim". Joshua Yehl of IGN called it a "double-edged season" referring to the contrast between the presentation and the story. He called the presentation, artistry, animation and sound design masterful, in contrast to the story that didn't always deliver satisfying answers to the questions introduced early in the season, despite being more mature and sophisticated than the original show.

Although many people considered the finale a satisfying conclusion, the final scene, in which Ashi is erased from existence following Aku's destruction before she can marry Jack, became divisive in light of Jack not being given a happier ending. Tartakovsky explained that he and the production staff had initially planned for Jack to fall in love, then lose that love in order to retain the series' overarching theme of making sacrifices to serve a greater purpose. He commented, "I feel like we would be cheating if everything was happy and perfect at the end...It didn't feel right. We thought about it, for sure. 'Why don't we give it a happy ending?' Instinctively, we knew that it would be wrong."

=== Video game ===
To address some of the criticisms towards the finale, video game publisher Adult Swim Games partnered with video game developer Soleil early in 2018 to create a game that would serve as an alternative scenario. Although Tartakovsky was initially disinterested and wanted nothing to do with the game, believing it was going to be a mediocre cash grab like the previous games The Amulet of Time and The Shadow of Aku, Adult Swim Games insisted that Soleil could deliver a quality product. After being persuaded by the publisher, Tartakovsky enlisted Season 5 head writer Darrick Bachman to keep the game's writing authentic to the series and to write around the perimeters set by the game's publisher for the developers, which was to include elements from all 5 seasons. The result was the 2020 action game Samurai Jack: Battle Through Time, which Tartakovsky approved of and pronounced canon. In the game, as Jack is making his journey home, Aku diverts him into a "timeless realm" from which he must escape with Ashi while reliving battles from the entire series, ultimately confronting Aku once again and destroying him in both the timeless realm and the past. If the player collects all the kamons belonging to Jack's father but corrupted by Aku, they can unlock an alternate ending where Jack and Ashi live together happily ever after regardless of Aku's destruction thanks to the time pocket copy of the future preventing Ashi's nonexistence. The game received a generally positive critical reception but was later removed from all digital stores across all platforms, alongside several other Cartoon Network games, on December 23, 2024.
