= Samurai Jack (comics) =

Series of comic books

- Samurai Jack and the Threads of Time #1

Publication information
- Publisher: IDW Publishing
- Schedule: Monthly
- Genre: Action-adventure; Comedy drama; Dystopian; Science fantasy
- Publication date: October 2013 – September 2019
- No. of issues: 24 and one special
- Main character(s): Jack; Aku

Creative team
- Created by: Genndy Tartakovsky; Jim Zub
- Written by: Jim Zub
- Artist: Andy Suriano

The Samurai Jack comics was a monthly American comic book series chronicling the travels of Samurai Jack, the protagonist of the eponymous series on Cartoon Network. The comic book series follows up on Season 4 of Samurai Jack, which tells of an unnamed, time-displaced feudal Japanese samurai prince, who takes the name "Jack", in his singular quest to find a method of travelling back in time and defeating the tyrannical demon Aku.

In February 2013, IDW Publishing announced a partnership with Cartoon Network to produce comics based on its properties. Samurai Jack was one of the titles announced to be published. It was further announced at WonderCon 2013 that the first issue of Samurai Jack will debut in October 2013. The first comic in the series was released October 23, 2013.

Nine years after Genndy Tartakovsky's series was put on hiatus, and just a few years before Adult Swim launched its concluding season, IDW Publishing had announced a new comic book featuring the continuing adventures of Jack, the temporally displaced warrior and his epic quest to destroy Aku. Beginning with a five-issue storyline called Rope of Eons. Suriano, who designed characters for the show, reflected on returning to the popular character via press release: "Returning to Samurai Jack is such a personal experience and labor of love for me. It's like stepping through a time portal back to characters I know as friends and a world that really launched my animation career".

The first volume, which contained Issues 1–5, was released in May 2014. It was made available as both a hard copy and an eBook with a total of 120 pages. Volume 2, "The Scotsman's Curse", contains issues 6–10 and was released 28 October 2014. Volume 3, which highlighted the "Quest for the Broken Blade" (Issues 11–15), was officially released on March 31, 2015. Volume 4; "The Warrior King", concluding issues 16–20, was released on September 1, 2015. Over a year later, IDW released a full omnibus compilation of all 20 issues, titled Samurai Jack: Tales of the Wandering Warrior, on October 25, 2016.

In January 2015, Jim Zub, creator of the Samurai Jack comic series, confirmed that the issues would be concluded with issue #20, in May 2015. He went on to state that "Working on Jack has been a project that felt just as creative and expansive as any creator-owned work I've done. Almost every single idea we pitched was enthusiastically approved by IDW and Cartoon Network. We told the stories we wanted to tell the way we wanted to tell them and, from everything I've seen and the people I've met, the fans thoroughly enjoyed them too. That's a rare and wonderful thing and I won't take it for granted." Zub wanted fans to feel that, with the comics, there is a sense of closure to the series. "In the third season of Samurai Jack there's an episode called 'Jack and Travelling Creatures' where, after trials and tribulations aplenty, we catch a glimpse of a possible future for our wandering hero; we see Jack as an older Warrior-King, a veteran of an untold number of conflicts". Zub stated that the team is "embracing that awesome vision of Jack in a very heartfelt done-in-one story called 'Mako the Scribe'." Tartakovsky does not consider the comics to be part of the canonical story of Samurai Jack.

On 8 May 2019, IDW Publishing released the first series of the Samurai Jack: Lost Worlds comic series. The story looks at how society has prospered under the leadership of the benevolent Samurai Jack and everything is in line with his philosophies after the events of Tales of the Wandering Warrior. On 20 November 2019, Samurai Jack: Lost Worlds was compiled into compendium of the four-part series. The story was produced by Paul Allor and illustrated by Adam Bryce Thomas.

== Plot ==
=== Tales of the Wandering Warrior ===
The series is set after the end of the fourth season. Sometime after the events of episode LII, Jack travels through a desert to find a hermit living in a cave, whom he inquires for a way to return to his own time. The hermit reveals that Aku learned his mastery of time travel through an ancient relic known as the Rope of Eons. He studied it, and absorbed its power before destroying it, so others couldn't learn its secrets, although it was possible for one to use the Rope once again if its strands were recovered and assembled together again. Jack embarks on many quests to reassemble the Rope, only to discover that the last strand was in Aku's possession. After Jack fights Aku and manages to take the last strand, Aku responds with a fierce attack that mortally wounds Jack, who is then given a choice to either fully sacrifice the Rope's power to undo the fatal blow, or die. Jack chooses the former, unwilling to lose to Aku, but is forced to escape without accomplishing his goal.

After the Rope was lost, Jack reunites with the Scotsman, only to confront a series of supernatural threats, such as the gender-bending curse of the leprechauns, a villain who can manipulate gravity and an attack on his samurai mentality and focus from Aku himself. He later makes another bid to return to his own time by performing a magic ritual that involved a seer using the spirit of his sword to create a time travel portal, but this backfires and breaks the weapon, leaving Jack unarmed and vulnerable. When Aku learns of the loss of Jack's sword, he stops at nothing to try and finish off Jack by any means necessary, but Jack manages to escape, stay hidden and survive without his weapon.

=== Quantum Jack ===
In 2017, months after the series was revived and finished with the fifth season, IDW Publishing released a new 5-issue miniseries called Quantum Jack, which takes place between the fourth and fifth seasons and depicts Samurai Jack hopping from one dimension to the next, searching for a way back to his original form as his honor and pride push him forward back to his own time to face Aku one last time. The first issue depicts Jack as the leader of a ruthless biker gang that ambushes a royal convoy. The second issue depicts Jack as a masked luchador. The third issue depicts Jack in a world ruled by monsters known as Krogo, where he teams up with a group of scientists that control a giant battle robot as Jack slowly starts to regain his memory. The fourth issue depicts Jack as a modern day-style business office employee working in a cubicle for Aku. The fifth and final issue finally reveals how and why Jack has been stranded in time as he makes one last gambit to return to his own time. This series was ultimately collected into a trade paperback.

=== Lost Worlds ===
In 2019, IDW Publishing released a new 4-issue miniseries called Lost Worlds, which also takes place between the fourth and fifth seasons and depicts Samurai Jack emerging from his hermetic life to discover a town ruled by a doppelganger of himself, who's determined to conquer the world and spread Jack's philosophies, teachings and beliefs. However, the two Jacks quickly clash as the true nature of the doppelganger is revealed.

== Issues ==
Samurai Jack: Tale of The Wandering Warrior comics overview
Issue No.	Issue Title	Overview	Release Date
1	Samurai Jack and the Threads of Time	Jack is stranded in a strange future ruled by the demonic wizard, Aku. His quest to return to the past has tested him many times, but now the stakes are higher than ever. Can an ancient relic known as the Rope of Eons finally take him home?	October 23, 2013
2	The Threads of Time	Jack can defeat almost any foe in single combat, but how will he fare against a pair of perfectly synchronized warriors who can exploit his every weakness?	November 20, 2013
3	The Threads of Time	Jack's travels bring him to a village filled with tension and mystery. Can he discover the town's strange secret before Aku's robotic army invades? Our samurai hero's quest to gather the Threads of Time continues.	December 18, 2013
4	The Threads of Time	A mystic queen of great power and beauty accepts no criticism, especially from a lowly wandering samurai. Can Jack find another one of the Threads of Time before he's imprisoned for royal heresy?	January 22, 2014
5	The Threads of Time	Jack learns that the last strand of the Rope of Eons is in Aku's possession. After Jack fights Aku and takes the last strand, Aku responds with a fierce attack that mortally wounds Jack, who is then given a choice to either fully sacrifice the Rope's power to undo the fatal blow, or die. Jack chooses the former.	February 26, 2014
Special	Samurai Jack: Special Director's Cut	A reprinted comic book adaptation of the first three episodes of the TV series: "The Beginning", "The Samurai Called Jack", and "The First Fight", featuring bonus pages and commentary from creator Genndy Tartakovsky and artist Bill Wray.	February, 2014
6	The Scotsman's Curse	The Scotsman, who has been magically changed into a woman by trickster leprechauns, invites Jack to help him regain his manhood. To make amends for the Scotsman drunkenly trespassing through their territory, Jack agrees to help the leprechauns hunt down their enemy: a giant rock monster named "Cuhullin the Cruel". However, as he shakes hands with a leprechaun, he is also changed into a woman.	March 19, 2014
7	Samurai Jacqueline and the Scotswoman	Jack and the Scotsman, still under the leprechauns' gender-bending curse caused by annoying music in their minds, find Cuhullin the Cruel and battle him until all his limbs are severed. They argue about whether to kill Cuhullin until he cries loudly enough to temporarily deafen them, restoring their manhood. After they learn of Cuhullin's true benevolent nature and reattach his limbs, the trio hatches a plan to get revenge on the leprechauns.	April 9, 2014
8	The Caves of Crystal Calamity	Jack reflects on his odyssey to return to the past, but he won't like what he finds staring back at him.	May 28, 2014
9	Villainous Vortex	How can our time-traveling samurai defeat a foe that controls the forces of gravity?	June 18, 2014
10	The Brain Battalion	The war without has been a failure for Aku, so now it's time to wage the war within! Can Jack overcome an opponent who unravels the thoughts and memories that make him a samurai?	July 30, 2014
11	The Quest of the Broken Blade: Part One	After the Threads of Time failed to return Jack back to the past, he searches for a new way to return to his rightful era. But will Jack be willing to risk his magical blade in order to open a new portal to the past?	August 20, 2014
12	The Quest of the Broken Blade: Part Two	Aku senses Jack's unexpected new flaw and calls forth a manhunt like no other. Soldiers, monsters, and bounty hunters scour the land for the weakened samurai warrior. Is anywhere safe?	September 24, 2014
13	The Quest of the Broken Blade: Part Three	Weak and exhausted, the fugitive samurai known only as 'Jack' is running out of hope. Will anyone come to his aid or is this the end of his lifelong mission?	October 22, 2014
14	The Quest of the Broken Blade: Part Four	Jack is tested by power greater than any he has ever faced before. Can he prove himself worthy and regain his strength?	November 30, 2014
15	The Quest of the Broken Blade: Part Five	Jack faces Aku in one-on-one combat and both are determined to make it their final battle. Past and present collide in this epic conclusion to the 'Quest of the Broken Blade' storyline.	December 31, 2014
16	The Master of Time: Part One	A prophet calling himself the "Master of Time" hides within a compound crawling with untold monsters and deadly traps. Jack the Samurai will need to become Jack the Infiltrator if he hopes to gain an audience with the mysterious master.	January 31, 2015
17	The Master of Time: Part Two	Jack and the Thief team-up to discover the mysteries of the secretive man known only as the “Master of Time.” Is this finally the way home for our solemn samurai?	February 28, 2015
18	The Fallen Four	Jack stumbles upon the site of great battle, grave-robbing witches brings back the spirits of the dead to defeat the samurai warrior!	March 31, 2015
19	The Mad Mutts of Mystery	Jack reunites with the team of dapper archaeological dogs as they search for their canine ancestry, but the secrets they fetch will leave them howling!	April 30, 2015
20	Mako the Scribe	In a possible future, a scribe named Mako seeks to document Jack's exploits but has trouble finding a reliable source. He eventually meets LaMarr, a man Jack helped in the past who leads him to a resistance army that the now-middle aged Jack has formed. Mako records many stories of Jack and his allies before they lead one final assault on Aku's tower. The issue ends without revealing the outcome of the battle.	May 31, 2015

Samurai Jack: Lost Worlds comics overview
Issue No.	Issue Title	Overview	Release Date
1	Samurai Jack 2.0	~	May 8, 2019
2	Samurai Jack and the Empty Village	~	June 19, 2019
3	Samurai Jack and the Bear Trap	~	July 31, 2019
4	Samurai Jack and the Flat Earth	~	September 4, 2019

== Appearance in other comics ==
Before the IDW series, Samurai Jack comics had appeared in Cartoon Network Action Pack, published by DC Comics.

Title	Issue(s)	Release date(s)
Cartoon Network: Action Packs	1, 3, 5, 8, 9, 10, 11, 12, 15, 16, 17, 18, 20, 22, 23, 24, 25, 27, 28, 29, 30, 31, 32, 33, 34, 35, 36, 37, 38, 39, 40, 41, 42, 44, 45, 46, 47, 53, 55, 58, 60	July, 2006 - July, 2011
Cartoon Network: Super Sampler	1	October, 2013

== Other comics ==
There have been other comic book series involving Samurai Jack, besides the 20-issue series that was produced and released as an intended follow-up to the fourth season of the series.

=== Classic Volumes ===
The Classic Volumes are series of comics based on the events that happened before and during the Samurai Jack television series. The 136-page collection focuses on Jack's origin story and was released November 12, 2013. Simply put, Aku the demon wizard has enslaved Jack's people. Jack inherits a mystical katana and beats Aku in battle only to be sent far into the future where Aku's grip is all-reaching and all-powerful. Thus starts Jack's quest to journey back to his original time so he may finish what he and Aku started. The rest consists of short tales of Jack liberating others from Aku's hold, before passing along to the next town in true drifter style. The artwork for the Classic Volumes is done by Ricardo Garcia Fuentes (commonly known as Micro), who also illustrated Jack in the Cartoon Network: Action Packs comic. Volume 2 of the Classic Volumes was officially released on April 22, 2014.

=== Cartoon Network: Super Secret Crisis War! ===
Samurai Jack appears in the IDW Publishing crossover event between all of their Cartoon Network-owned properties, "Super Secret Crisis War!", which includes Ben 10: Omniverse, Dexter's Laboratory, The Powerpuff Girls, Ed, Edd n Eddy, Johnny Bravo, Cow and Chicken, Codename: Kids Next Door, Foster's Home for Imaginary Friends, and The Grim Adventures of Billy & Mandy. The crossover shows Aku teaming up with Mandark, Vilgax and Mojo Jojo to form the "League of Extraordinary Villains" and capture Ben Tennyson, Samurai Jack, Dexter, The Powerpuff Girls and (inadvertently) the Eds, as they plan to conquer the Cartoon Network multiverse and take out their mortal enemies. The series also had 5 tie-in one-shots of the League's robot minions invading the dimensions of Johnny Bravo, Foster's Home for Imaginary Friends, Cow and Chicken, Codename: Kids Next Door and The Grim Adventures of Billy & Mandy. This series was collected into two trade paperbacks.

== Collected Editions ==
Title	Material Collected	Publication dates	ISBN
Samurai Jack Classics Vol. 1	stories from Cartoon Network Action Pack #1-21	November 12, 2013	978-1613777817
Samurai Jack Classics Vol. 2	stories from Cartoon Network Action Pack #22-60	May 6, 2014	978-1613779378
Samurai Jack Vol. 1: The Threads of Time	Samurai Jack #1-5	June 17, 2014	978-1613778944
Samurai Jack Vol. 2: The Scotsman's Curse	Samurai Jack #6-10	October 14, 2014	978-1631401312
Samurai Jack Vol. 3: Quest For The Broken Blade	Samurai Jack #11-15	April 21, 2015	978-1631402456
Samurai Jack Vol. 4: The Warrior-King	Samurai Jack #16-20	September 1, 2015	978-1631403804
Samurai Jack: Tales of the Wandering Warrior	Samurai Jack #1-20	October 25, 2016	978-1631407093
Samurai Jack: Quantum Jack	Samurai Jack: Quantum Jack #1-5	May 29, 2018	978-1684051670
Samurai Jack: Lost Worlds	Samurai Jack: Lost Worlds #1-4	December 17, 2019	978-1684055524
