= Greg Baldwin =

American voice actor (born 1960)

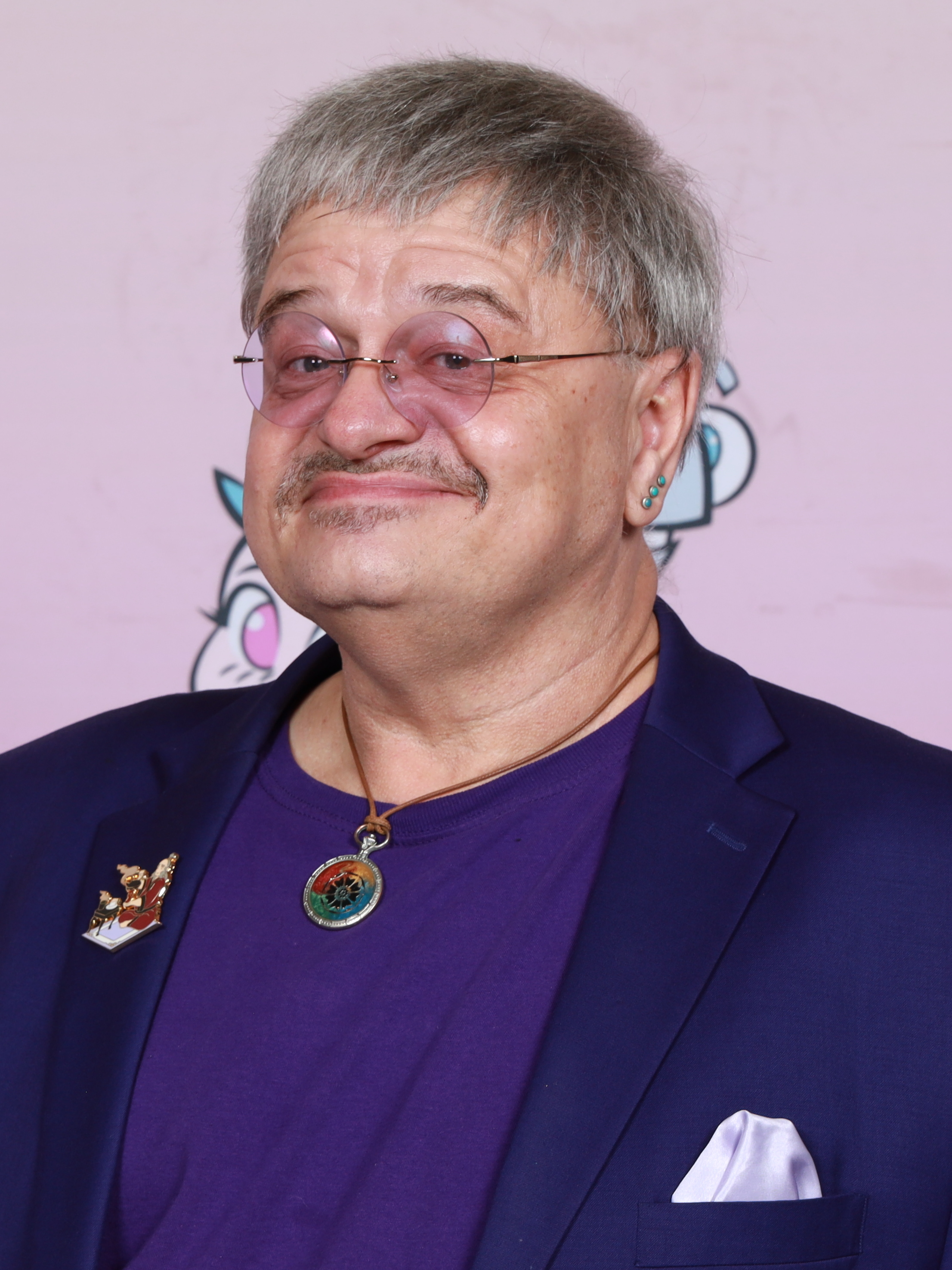
- Baldwin at Animate! Raleigh in 2025
- Born: September 13, 1960 (age 66); New Mexico, U.S.
- Occupation: Actor
- Years active: 1982–present
- Spouse: Melissa Baldwin (m. 1984)
- Children: 2

Greg Baldwin (born September 13, 1960) is an American voice actor. He is best known for his roles as Uncle Iroh on the third season of Avatar: The Last Airbender and Aku on the fifth season of Samurai Jack, with both being as a voice match for the late Mako Iwamatsu.

== Career ==
Baldwin has worked in the theater extensively as Sidney Lipton in God's Favorite, Mushnik in Little Shop of Horrors, Dr. Zubritsky in Neil Simon's Fools, Count Otto Von Bruno in Bullshot Crummond, and the Baker in The Baker's Wife.

=== Successor of Mako Iwamatsu ===
Baldwin first began voicing the character of Iroh in Avatar: The Last Airbender for brief pieces of dialogue in the show's second season when Mako Iwamatsu was unable to record before his death. These pieces were mixed with the material Iwamatsu already recorded. Baldwin later voiced the character of Iroh full-time for the final season, various video games based on the franchise, and for the second and third seasons of The Legend of Korra.

Baldwin also performed a substantial portion of Splinter's dialogue in the movie TMNT following Mako's death during production. His recordings would again be mixed with Iwamatsu's based on their vocal similarities.

Baldwin would again succeed Iwamatsu by voicing Aku in the 2009 video game Cartoon Network Universe: FusionFall and for the fifth season of Samurai Jack. In 2020, he reprised his role as Aku in the Samurai Jack: Battle Through Time video game.

At the time the fifth season of Samurai Jack was being released, series creator Genndy Tartakovsky was asked about Baldwin's casting and made the following statement in an interview with The Verge:

"It was hard. For a while, I thought we should reimagine Aku with a different voice, perhaps even use a different character. But then I realized I love Aku too much, so we auditioned a few people, and Greg really did the best job. Honestly, nobody can replace Mako, he was that special, that unique, especially the performance he made for Aku. But Greg did really well. On the last episode, Mako's daughter and grandson came by, and they watched him record, and they were crying. It was really amazing, because they heard the voice of their dad and grandfather."

=== Other works ===
Aside from often serving as a voice double for Iwamatsu, Baldwin has also voiced original characters for both Samurai Jack and the Avatar franchise, as well as for various TV shows and video games outside of those two series. He provided the voices of multiple characters in Star Wars: The Clone Wars and Lego Star Wars: The Freemaker Adventures, and he made a guest appearance in Xiaolin Showdown, SpongeBob SquarePants, Curious George, and The Marvelous Misadventures of Flapjack.

Baldwin was credited as the original actor for Atlas in BioShock; he was replaced by Karl Hanover in the final version of the game and the character's original Southern drawl was changed into an Irish accent. His voice can also be heard in numerous other video games, including Tom Clancy's Rainbow Six: Lockdown, Assassin's Creed: Brotherhood, F.E.A.R. and Fallout 4.

On April 2, 2021, Baldwin announced that he was cast in an undisclosed original role for the Disney Television Animation program, The Ghost and Molly McGee. Upon release, Baldwin's role was later revealed to be one of the members of the Ghost Council, and the show's second season revealed his character's name to be Bartholomew. Baldwin would also go on to provide additional voices for the series.

In a rare live-action performance, he appeared as communist writer Dutch Zweistrong in Hail, Caesar!.

== Personal life ==
Baldwin currently resides in Albuquerque with his wife Melissa Baldwin. Together they have two children, Sydney and Cooper.

According to an interview with The Dot and Line, Baldwin was able to fill-in for Mako on his voice roles by listening to the cast album of Pacific Overtures, a musical that Mako starred in, which was a personal favorite album of Baldwin's.

In May 2023, Baldwin posed the question on his Twitter account as to whether he should run for Governor of New Mexico in 2026. In November 2024, Baldwin reiterated his interest in running for governor "beyond [the] fractured two party system" as part of the White Lotus Party, named in reference to the secret society in Avatar: The Last Airbender which his voiced character, Iroh, is part of.

Prior to making these announcements, Baldwin frequently used his social media accounts to express support for various Democratic politicians and causes, particularly on Twitter. For instance, he stated his support for Deb Haaland to be governor of New Mexico, while also commenting that he would not mind running for mayor of Albuquerque instead at some point in the future.

== Filmography ==
=== Film ===
List of voice performances in feature films
Year	Title	Role	Notes
2007	TMNT	Splinter	Grouped under "Additional Voices"

=== Animation ===
List of voice performances on television
Year	Title	Role	Notes
2004	Xiaolin Showdown	Daddy Bailey	Episode: "Big as Texas"
2004–05	Brandy & Mr. Whiskers	Boris, Talk Show Host, Monkey	3 episodes
2007–08	Avatar: The Last Airbender	Uncle Iroh, Additional Voices	10 episodes
2007	SpongeBob SquarePants	Jack M. Crazyfish	Episode: "Blackened Sponge"
2009	Curious George	Morty the Cab Driver	Episode: "Wheels on the Bus"
2009	The Marvelous Misadventures of Flapjack	Sir Pattington, Constable	Episode: "Diamonds in the Stuff"
2010–12	Star Wars: The Clone Wars	Tera Sinube, Casiss, Serapis, Gwarm, Doge Urus	7 episodes
2013–14	The Legend of Korra	Uncle Iroh, Additional Voices	4 episodes
2016–17	Lego Star Wars: The Freemaker Adventures	Furlac, Ranat, Additional Voices	4 episodes
2017	Samurai Jack	Aku, Ringo, Orc Captain, Additional Voices	7 episodes
2021–24	The Ghost and Molly McGee	Bartholomew, Julius Caesar, Additional Voices	15 episodes

=== Video games ===
List of voice performances in video games
Year	Title	Role
2005	Tom Clancy's Rainbow Six: Lockdown	Additional Voices
2005	Dungeons & Dragons: Dragonshard	Additional Voices
2005	F.E.A.R.	Norton Mapes, Additional Voices
2006	Gothic 3	Zuben
2006	Medieval II: Total War	Additional Voices
2006	Cars	Lenny
2007	Cars Mater-National Championship	Lenny
2007	BioShock	Frank Fontaine
2007	Avatar: The Last Airbender – The Burning Earth	Uncle Iroh, Additional Voices
2008	Kung Fu Panda	Master Oogway
2008	Avatar: The Last Airbender – Into the Inferno	Uncle Iroh, Combustion Man, Fire Nation Soldier
2008	Spider-Man: Web of Shadows	Jackal, Mysterio
2008	Aion: Upheaval	Additional Voices
2008	White Knight Chronicles	Additional Voices
2009	Cartoon Network Universe: FusionFall	Aku
2009	Cars Race-O-Rama	Additional Voices
2010	Assassin's Creed: Brotherhood	Additional Voices
2010	Valkyria Chronicles II	Gilbert Gassenari
2011	Rango	Brawler #2, Jumper #2, Charger #2
2011	The Elder Scrolls V: Skyrim	Additional Voices
2011	Kinect: Disneyland Adventures	Additional Voices
2014	The Legend of Korra	Uncle Iroh
2015	Fallout 4	Proctor Teagan
2020	Ghost of Tsushima	Additional Voices
2020	Samurai Jack: Battle Through Time	Aku

=== Live-action ===
List of acting performances in film and television
Year	Title	Role	Notes
2016	Hail, Caesar!	Dutch Zweistrong	
2016–18	Adam Ruins Everything	Various	4 episodes

== Theatre ==
- Bullshot Crummond – Count Otto Von Bruno
- God's Favorite – Sidney Lipton
- Little Shop of Horrors – Mushnik
- The Baker's Wife – The Baker
