= Samurai Jack: The Shadow of Aku =

2004 action-adventure video game

- US box art for PS2 version
- Developer: Adrenium Games
- Publisher: Sega
- Director: Dominick Meissner
- Producer: Alex Pantelias
- Designer: Geoff Card
- Programmer: Dave LeCompte
- Artist: Jason Zayas
- Composer: James L. Venable; Paul Dinletir
- Platform: PlayStation 2; GameCube
- Release: NA: March 23, 2004; PAL: June 25, 2004 (GCN); PAL: August 6, 2004 (PS2)
- Genre: Action-adventure; Science fantasy; Platformer
- Modes: Single-player, multiplayer

Samurai Jack: The Shadow of Aku is an action-adventure video game released in 2004 by Adrenium Games and published by Sega and based on the Samurai Jack animated television series on Cartoon Network. It is the second game based on the series after Samurai Jack: The Amulet of Time on the Game Boy Advance a year prior. The series' original voice actors, including Phil LaMarr, Mako Iwamatsu, Jeff Bennett, John DiMaggio, and Jennifer Hale, reprised their respective roles for the game. The game was released for the PlayStation 2 and GameCube. An Xbox version of the game was planned, but never released, even though it was included on the official Xbox 360 Backwards Compatibility list.

Samurai Jack: The Shadow of Aku received mixed reviews. With Shadow of Aku being unreleased on the Xbox, the next licensed Samurai Jack game, Battle Through Time, was released on August 21, 2020, becoming the first Samurai Jack game available on Microsoft platforms.

== Gameplay ==
The game features an original story interconnected throughout 18 levels in 4 areas (Village: 5 levels, Forest: 4 levels, Underground: 4 levels, and Aku City: 5 levels). The player takes control of Jack, the series' protagonist and main character, as he rescues villagers, battles Aku's minions, and ultimately searches for the time portal to take him back to his own time. Jack's move set contains 25 moves and combo attacks, and his weapons include three elemental swords, shurikens, and a bow and arrow. The player can also fill Jack's "Zen meter", which allows him to enter a special slow-motion attack mode called "Sakai mode", among other things. The game ends in a final battle with Jack's nemesis, Aku. Other bosses include Mad Jack and the Scotsman.

== Reception ==
Reception

Aggregate score
Aggregator	Score	
Aggregator	GameCube	PS2
Metacritic	59/100	59/100

Review scores
Publication	Score	
Publication	GameCube	PS2
Electronic Gaming Monthly	7/10	N/A
Game Informer	6/10	N/A
GamePro	N/A	3.5/5
GameRevolution	N/A	D
GameSpot	N/A	5.2/10
GameSpy	2/5	N/A
GameZone	7/10	6/10
IGN	5.2/10	5.2/10
Nintendo Life	6/10	N/A
Nintendo Power	3.8/5	N/A
Official U.S. PlayStation Magazine	N/A	4/5
Official Xbox Magazine (US)	N/A	N/A
The Sydney Morning Herald	N/A	2.5/5
The Times	2/5	2/5

Samurai Jack: The Shadow of Aku received "mixed or average" reviews from critics. Mary Jane Irwin of IGN criticized the game for its annoying combat system, "uninteresting" story, and lack of challenge in boss battles. She also heavily criticized the game's visuals, saying, "Everything is incredibly angular and the only way to describe it is awful. It's just sad that in no way was the show's incredible presentation translated into the videogame." GameSpot's Alex Navarro called it "utterly forgettable" and said, "its lack of depth, style, or technical polish essentially ruins whatever chance it ever could have had to appeal to anyone outside of the most diehard of Samurai Jack fans." Both critics did, however, compliment the game on its sound.

The Sydney Morning Herald gave it a score of two-and-a-half stars out of five and stated that "While [the game] is an enjoyable adventure for youngsters, it is also wearingly generic and disappointingly brief." The Times gave it only two stars out of five and said, "The trouble is that once you have got the hang of the swordplay, throwing stars and bow and arrow, it all becomes a bit repetitive, while the problem-solving element to the game provides little challenge."
