= Jack Tales =

Jack Tales may refer to:

- Jack tales, a traditional English and Appalachian folklore genre
- "Jack Tales", an episode of the animated TV series "Samurai Jack"
