= Samurai Jack (character) =

Fictional title character of Samurai Jack

Jack The Samurai
- Samurai Jack character
- First appearance: "The Premiere Movie" (2001)
- Last appearance: "CI" (2017)
- Created by: Genndy Tartakovsky
- Voiced by: Phil LaMarr; Jonathan Osser (young); Keith Ferguson (Cartoon Network: Punch Time Explosion); Hugh Davidson (Mad)

In-universe information
- Full name: Bazan Rento
- Aliases: Jack (Note: The main character adopts his name during the Premiere Movie after being thrust into Aku's future, wherein local youths use the name "Jack" to refer to him. When asked later on what his name is, the character declares, "They call me Jack."); The Samurai; Samurai Jack
- Species: Human
- Gender: Male
- Title: Prince
- Occupation: Samurai/rōnin
- Affiliation: The Scotsman; Spartans; Ashi
- Fighting style: Kenjutsu
- Weapon: Katana
- Family: The Emperor (father); The Empress (mother); Ashi (late fiancé ("CI"), wife (Samurai Jack: Battle Through Time); Daughters of Aku (late sisters-in-law (Samurai Jack: Battle Through Time)
- Nationality: Japanese

Samurai Jack, also known as The Samurai or simply Jack, is a sobriquet adopted by the titular protagonist of the Cartoon Network/Adult Swim animated television series Samurai Jack (2001–2004, 2017). He was created by Genndy Tartakovsky and is voiced by Phil LaMarr. The character is introduced as a Japanese prince raised since youth as a samurai warrior, who trains under several teachers in order to vanquish the demon Aku with his father's sword. However, before he can do so, Aku sends him into the future, where Aku's future self rules over Earth, which has become a post-apocalyptic dystopia, unopposed. Adopting the alias "Jack", the samurai makes it his mission to find a way back to his time and prevent this future from happening.

== Conception and character ==
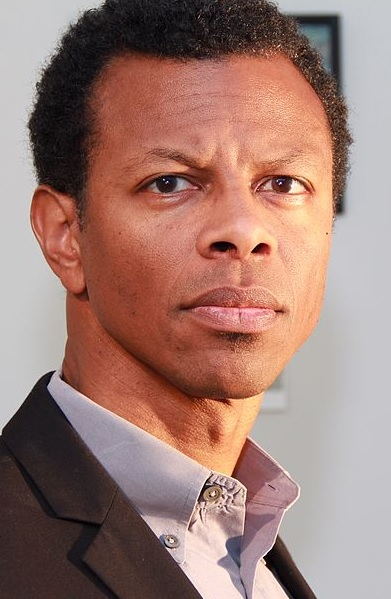
Samurai Jack is voiced by Phil LaMarr.

Samurai Jack, as a character, was originally conceived by the series creator Genndy Tartakovsky. The basic premise of Samurai Jack comes from Tartakovsky's childhood fascination with samurai culture and the bushido code, as well as a recurring dream in which he wielded a samurai sword and wandered a post-apocalyptic Earth fighting mutants with his crush. The show is meant to evoke 1970s cinematography, as well as classic Hollywood films such as Ben-Hur, Lawrence of Arabia and Spartacus. Thematic and visual inspirations come from Frank Miller's comic book series Rōnin, including the premise of a master-less samurai warrior thrown into a dystopic future in order to battle a shape-shifting demon. Similarly, the episode "Jack and the Spartans" was specifically inspired by Miller's graphic novel 300 that retold the Battle of Thermopylae. Cartoon Network executive Mike Lazzo recalled Tartakovsky pitching him the series with Phil LaMarr as Jack as the main character: "He said, 'Hey, remember David Carradine in Kung Fu? Wasn't that cool?' and I was like, 'Yeah, that's really cool.' That was literally the pitch." Cartoon Network billed [Samurai Jack] as a series "that is cinematic in scope and that incorporates action, humor, and intricate artistry."

== Story ==
After the demon lord Aku reawakens, captures his father and conquers his homeland, the child who would become known as "Samurai Jack" was trained to be the ultimate samurai by teachers from various cultures around the world in order to wield his family's sword against Aku. After reuniting with his mother as an adult, he leaves to vanquish Aku using his father's sword. However, before he can land the final blow, the demon exiles him to a point in the distant future where the demon reigns supreme. Adopting a name for the first time, "Jack", the samurai fights against Aku's forces for the next fifty years while attempting to both destroy Aku in the future and find a way back to the past to destroy him then.

=== The Premiere Movie ===
==== Part I: The Beginning ====
Jack was born a prince to his father's empire in an era reminiscent of Japan's Edo period, albeit with culture closer to the Nara and Heian periods, shortly after he sealed away Aku. At the beginning of the series, when Jack is eight years old, a solar eclipse breaks the seal and frees Aku, who abducts Jack's father. As his parents had planned should Aku ever return, Jack's mother sends him to train around the world before going into hiding.

Jack's mother leaves him on a Japanese ship, where the captain teaches him astronomy and how to navigate via the stars. The ship takes Jack to Arabia, where a sheik teaches him to ride horses. From there, he is brought to Africa, where he learns to fight with pole weapons from a tribe of bushmen. After reaching proficiency, he travels to Egypt, where he is educated by their best scholars. Jack eventually moves to Greece and learns the art of wrestling, followed by a trip to England, where Robin Hood teaches him archery and how to hone his senses. He then travels on a Viking longboat working as a member of the crew. In Russia, he studies the art of axe-throwing from a boyar and later goes to Mongolia to learn combat on horseback. His final training takes him to a Shaolin monk temple, where he learns their discipline and Chinese martial arts.

After completing his training, Jack returns to the temple where his mother is hiding and is given the sword his father used to seal Aku along with his signature robe. Jack travels to Aku's castle, where he finds his father, who warns him that it is too early for him to fight Aku. However, Jack ignores this warning and sets out to fight Aku; when it appears he has the upper hand and is about to deliver the final blow, Aku exiles Jack into the distant future.

==== Part II: The Samurai Called Jack ====
Jack lands in a technologically advanced city in a dystopian future and meets three urban alien teenagers who call him "Jack". He learns from them that Aku has conquered the world and spread his influence throughout the galaxy, enslaving planets while using Earth as his base of operations. They suggest getting a drink at a nearby bar, where Jack disposes of alien criminals there. This attracts the attention of a group of anthropomorphic dog archaeologists, who learn of Jack's origins and ask him to help save their group from Aku's oppression. Jack agrees and leaves with them, introducing himself as "Jack" for the first time. One of the bar's alien waitresses, who is secretly a spy for Aku, informs him of Jack's actions at the bar as Jack and his companions arrive at the mines the dogs were excavating.

==== Part III: The First Fight ====
Jack and the dogs devise a strategy to defeat Aku's army of mechanical beetle drones. On the day of the attack, Jack faces the army and drastically reduces their numbers using the crystals Aku forced the dogs to dig for, but runs out of artillery and is forced to fight the remaining drones on foot. Despite suffering several injuries, Jack finishes off the last of the drones as they attempt to retreat. With the army defeated, the dogs thank him before parting ways. Aku, who has been watching the battle, promises Jack that he will defeat him.

=== Seasons 1–4 ===
The series follows Jack's adventures as he searches for a way back to his time, gaining the respect of those he helps along the way. Between seasons 4 and 5, Jack fell into depression and madness due to his constant failure to return home.

=== Comic series ===
In February 2013, IDW Publishing announced a partnership with Cartoon Network to produce comics based on its properties. Samurai Jack was one of the titles announced to be published. It was further announced at WonderCon 2013 that the first issue of Samurai Jack would debut in October 2013, serving as a continuation from the fourth season of the series. The first comic in the series was released October 23, 2013. The final issue came out in May 2015. On October 25, 2016, IDW re-released all of the issues in a compilation entitled "Tales of a Wandering Warrior". Tartakovsky does not consider the comics part of the series canon. In 2017 and 2019, IDW Publishing published respective 5-issue and 4-issue miniseries, titled Quantum Jack and Lost Worlds, bridging the events of the fourth and fifth seasons.

Jack also appeared in multiple issues of DC Comics' anthology comic series Cartoon Network Action Pack, which ran from July 2006 to April 2012, as well as the crossover event Cartoon Network: Super Secret Crisis War!, which included characters from Ben 10: Omniverse, Dexter's Laboratory, The Powerpuff Girls, Ed, Edd n Eddy, Johnny Bravo, Cow and Chicken, Codename: Kids Next Door, Foster's Home for Imaginary Friends, and The Grim Adventures of Billy & Mandy.

=== Season 5 ===
In Episode XCVIII, it is revealed that Jack lost his sword after Aku prevented him from using the final time portal, destroying it and mutating three ram-like creatures. While fighting them, his sword fell into the pit where the time portal was, forcing him to instead use futuristic technology. Though disillusioned and haunted by the past, Jack continued his journey, unable to physically age due to the effects of the magic Aku used to send him through time, and with his tortured conscience as his only constant companion. Over fifty years, those he helped, as well as other oppressed people on Earth and throughout the galaxy, began to rebel against Aku's rule, inspired by his nobility and bravery.

==== Episodes 1–5 ====
In Episode XCII, he rescues a family from the Beetle Drones and sees a plume of smoke in the distance. When he stops for water, he sees visions of his parents and his people asking why has he forsaken them, followed by the Omen, a figure on horseback. This happens again at night, as sees a vision of his father surrounded by flames, expressing his displeasure that he has forgotten his purpose, along with the Omen. Jack arrives at the source of the smoke at a ruined city and encounters Scaramouche, who mocks him for losing his sword before attempting to tell Aku the news. During the battle, he hallucinates again, this time seeing children and the Omen, but defeats Scaramouche, taking his tuning fork sword before leaving.

In Episode XCIII, he stops to deal with a Beetle Drone and hides in its husk after the Daughters of Aku ambush him. While hiding, he sees a vision of himself telling him to surrender and join his ancestors by honorably ending his own life, since there is no honor in fighting and he cannot stop Aku without his sword. However, Jack refuses, believing that he can still triumph. He then hides in a nearby temple, where the Daughters of Aku find him. When one of the sisters stabs him in the stomach, Jack kills her and is horrified that he has killed a human and not a machine as he assumed. He destroys the temple and jumps into the river below to escape before passing out from blood loss.

In Episode XCIV, Jack reaches a cave while being pursued by a mysterious samurai and passes out. Upon waking up, the hallucination of himself reappears and taunts him over his first human kill, concluding that Jack wanted the Daughters to kill him, though Jack denies this. The next morning, a wolf enters the cave and Jack passes out again; while unconscious, he remembers when his father defended his family from bandits who ambushed their carriage. Upon awakening, Jack bonds with the wolf and, remembering his father's lesson, parts ways with it before preparing himself for a rematch with the Daughters of Aku. The Daughters track him down and Jack gives them the same ultimatum his father gave the bandits: leave or face their destiny. They refuse and, in the ensuing battle, Jack kills six of them before confronting the last one, Ashi, who seemingly falls to her death. The tree then collapses, sending Jack falling into the valley.

In Episode XCV, following a nightmare about the Daughters, Jack wakes up in the valley and finds Ashi, who seemingly died on impact. Jack hallucinates a murder of crows taunting him for killing people, though he defends his actions, claiming the Daughters chose their path. However, Ashi survived and he is forced to fight her again; as he tries to convince her that he is not the enemy, a monster appears and swallows them whole. While trying to find a way out, he defends her from monsters while unsuccessfully trying to convince her that Aku is the true enemy. As they stop to rest, a creature appears and tries to convince Jack to escape without Ashi, believing that she is only evil. Jack refuses to listen to it, but its opinion is shared by his self-hallucination. When Jack argues he caused them to end up in this situation, his hallucination reveals that Ashi has disappeared. Jack kills the crab-like creature that abducted Ashi and saves her; while climbing to a higher area, he determines that a way out is nearby. Upon reaching the top, they find an exit over a pool of acid and hitch a ride on flying creatures to escape. A fish-like monster attacks them, but they reach the exit and land in a surrounding ocean. Once outside, Jack rescues Ashi, then swims to a nearby island. As he interacts with a ladybug native to the island, Ashi realizes that he is not her real enemy and begins to warm up to him.

The redesign of Samurai Jack for the first seven episodes of the fifth season.

In Episode XCVI, Jack and Ashi return to the mainland with help from a sea serpent and he leaves her behind. That night, following another hallucination from Jack's campfire, she appears and demands that he tell her the truth about Aku. Jack tells her that she already knows the truth, but relents and agrees to show her more in the morning. Before they sleep, Ashi asks Jack if Aku created the stars, and he responds by telling her his mother's story of how the Sun and Moon formed the heavens. The next morning, Jack shows Ashi Aku's atrocities by showing her the destroyed remnants of a forest and how Aku's regime provides asylum to intergalactic criminals. At a ruined city, Ashi finally sees the truth and resolves to help end Aku's tyranny, but Jack disagrees, claiming he cannot stop Aku without his sword. In the city, they find a blue humanoid in the rubble who tells them that their children were captured and taken to a nearby factory, and they decide to infiltrate the factory to rescue them. After discovering that the children are being mind-controlled by a high-pitched frequency, Jack keeps them occupied while Ashi searches for the source of the noise. She eventually kills the factory's owner and destroys the control panel, freeing the children. As Jack believes them to be dead, the Omen appears before him and tells him that it is time. Depressed from his perceived failure, Jack agrees and accompanies him out of the factory.

==== Episodes 6–10 ====
In Episode XCVII, Ashi finds Jack meditating at a cemetery, surrounded by the ghosts of other samurai and about to commit seppuku with help from the Omen. After Ashi reminds him that there is always hope and informs him that the children they saved are alive, Jack overcomes his depression and intervenes before the Omen can kill Ashi, killing it with the sword meant for his disembowelment. Afterwards, Jack resolves to find his father's sword.

In Episode XCVIII, Jack and Ashi return to the mountain where Jack lost his sword, but do not find it, and Jack concludes that, after spilling innocent blood, the sword abandoned him. While Ashi stays behind to protect him, Jack meditates on another plane of existence to find his sword, eventually reaching a house in the middle of an ocean where a monk invites him for tea. Jack prepares a cup of tea, but the monk informs him that it, and therefore him, is missing balance, which has blocked off the path to the sword. Confused by this revelation, Jack begs the monk to show him the way, but the monk tells him that he must do so himself. Dissatisfied with this outcome, Jack's dark side appears and claims that the monk knows the location of the sword, but is hiding it from them. However, Jack explains that he already knows where the sword is, opening his eyes to the truth and overcoming his dark side, causing it to disappear. The monk declares that Jack has found balance, and Jack appears before the deities Odin, Ra, and Vishnu. Like his father, they deem him worthy of the sword, returning it to him and restoring his original appearance. Jack returns to Earth and, with his confidence and sword returned, declares that Aku is their next target.

In Episode XCIX, Jack and Ashi stop to rest in a city in the desert before leaving across the desert, later taking refuge from a sandstorm in a structure that they discover is a prison ship, though the prisoners are nowhere to be found. After Ashi is poisoned by a leech-like creature, Jack kills it and remove the poison from her leg before it can spread further. As they head deeper into the prison, they confront an alien monster made of the leech creatures. Soon, they reach the ship's armory, where Jack finds a device that can kill the monster, which is known as Lazarus 92, and kills it with an electrical charge. Afterwards, he and Ashi realize their feelings for each other and kiss.

In Episode C, that evening, Jack opens up to Ashi about the memories of his home. Before dawn, Jack leaves her and returns to the robot graveyard, where he finds that the Guardian and his time portal have been destroyed. Ashi confronts him, demanding to know why he left her behind, and he explains that Aku has taken everything from him and he does not want this to happen to her. However, Ashi assures him they will defeat Aku together. Aku and Scaramouche confront them, and Aku destroys Scaramouche in frustration after learning that Jack has recovered his sword. He prepares to leave, but realizes that Ashi carries his scent and remembers when he visited the members of the Cult of Aku and gave them some of his essence. He deduces that the High Priestess drank his essence and gave birth to the Daughters of Aku, making Ashi his biological daughter. Aku uses his essence inside Ashi to control her body and force her to fight against Jack. Jack manages to get through to Ashi and she begs him to kill her and stop Aku, but he is unable to bring himself to harm her. Before Ashi can kill Jack, Aku orders her to stop, claiming Jack's sword as he kneels in defeat.

In the finale, episode CI, Jack has been captured in Aku's lair and is scheduled to be executed, and unsuccessfully tries to get Ashi to resist Aku's influence. However, before she can kill him, his allies arrive to rescue him, having seen his planned execution on TV. Jack escapes and meets up with his friend, the Scotsman, who tells him about his daughters. Jack declines his offer to have one of them be his wife, explaining that he has Ashi.

Jack then attempts to free Ashi after being swallowed by her, finally succeeding after confessing his love for her. Aku then confronts Ashi, who declares that he is not her father. Ashi and Jack realize that she still has Aku's powers, and after a battle, she retrieves his sword and uses her powers to create a time portal to return to the point where Aku first sent Jack into the future, and Jack kills Aku. Some time later, Jack and Ashi are to be married, but Ashi collapses at the altar, explaining that Aku's death in the past prevents her existence before fading away.

Later, Jack mourns Ashi's death in the forest, but his hope is renewed after he sees a ladybug and is reminded that the future will be bright now that Aku is gone. He watches as the sun shines over the forest, revealing its beauty.

== Samurai Jack: Battle Through Time ==
In the 2020 video game, if the player defeats Aku after destroying all 50 Corrupted Emperor's Kamon medals, it unlocks a unique scene similar to, but separate from the original finale's conclusion. Due to the time pocket copy of the future preventing Ashi's nonexistence, Ashi survives and lives happily with Jack.

== Cultural impact ==
=== Critical reception ===
The depiction of Jack in the series' fifth season has been praised for its exploration of the hero's journey and the identity of the hero when their journey stagnates. Choice and lack of choice are explored: in Jack's introspections and actions; in the actions of Jack's enemies; in the contrast between humans who choose their actions and machines which are programmed; and in destiny and fate which offer no choice. Of the distinction and parallel between robots and humans, Tartakovsky said: "I wanted to show the human side that's been treated like a machine. Aku builds robots and all these robots are singularly programmed to kill Jack. What if it's humans? What if the one purpose in your whole life is to kill this one person and you're raised from birth that way?" Angelica Jade Bastién of New York magazine writes that there is a "distinctive undercurrent of loneliness stretching through the series from start to finish." Jack is often alone, dwarfed by the "grand solemnity of nature." He has lost his home and his relationship with his family, and in the final episode he loses his relationship with the woman he is about to marry.

=== Merchandise ===
Several toys and merchandise works of Samurai Jack have been released. A Funko Pop figurine of the character was announced on October 3, 2019. and Hasbro released a six-inch action figure of the character as promotion for the series' fourth season.

=== In other media ===
Samurai Jack appears in MultiVersus as part of its second season and in Jellystone!.
