= Samurai Jack =

American animated television series

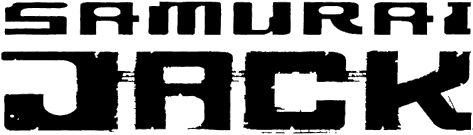
- Genre: Action-adventure; Comedy drama; Dystopian science fantasy
- Created by: Genndy Tartakovsky
- Showrunner: Genndy Tartakovsky
- Directed by: Genndy Tartakovsky; Randy Myers; Robert Alvarez; Rob Renzetti; Chris Savino
- Voices of: Phil LaMarr; Mako (S1-4); Greg Baldwin (S5); Tara Strong
- Theme music composer: will.i.am; George Pajon Jr.; Tyler Bates (S5)
- Opening theme: "Samurai Jack"
- Ending theme: "Samurai Jack"
- Composers: James L. Venable (S1-4); Tyler Bates (S5); Joanne Higginbottom (S5); Dieter Hartmann (S5); Paul Dinletir (S1-4)
- Country of origin: United States
- Original language: English
- No. of seasons: 5
- No. of episodes: 62 (list of episodes)

Production
- Executive producers: Genndy Tartakovsky; Mike Lazzo; Linda Simensky; Brian A. Miller; Jennifer Pelphrey; Rob Sorcher; Keith Crofford
- Producer: Genndy Tartakovsky
- Editor: Paul Douglas
- Running time: 22 minutes
- Production companies: Cartoon Network Studios; Williams Street (season 5)

Original release
- Network: Cartoon Network
- Release: August 10, 2001 – September 25, 2004
- Network: Adult Swim
- Release: March 11 – May 20, 2017

Samurai Jack is an American animated science fantasy action-adventure television series created by Genndy Tartakovsky for Cartoon Network and later its nighttime programming block Adult Swim. It was produced by Cartoon Network Studios. Tartakovsky conceived Samurai Jack after finishing his work on his first Cartoon Network original series, Dexter's Laboratory, which premiered in 1996. Samurai Jack took inspiration from the 1972 televised drama Kung Fu, starring David Carradine, as well as Tartakovsky's fascination with the historic samurai culture of Japan and the Frank Miller comic series Ronin.

The titular character is a Japanese samurai prince who wields a mystic katana capable of cutting through virtually anything. He sets out to free his kingdom after it is taken over by an evil, shapeshifting demon lord known as Aku. The two engage in a fierce battle, but just as the prince is about to deliver the final strike, Aku sends him forward in time to a dystopian future ruled by the tyrannical demon. Adopting the name "Jack" after being addressed as such by beings in this time period, he quests to travel back to his own time and defeat Aku before he can take over the world. Jack's search for a way back to his own time period transcends Aku's control, but Jack's efforts are largely in vain due to the way back to his home ending up just out of his reach.

The series was initially broadcast from August 10, 2001, to September 25, 2004, airing for four seasons comprising thirteen episodes each, without concluding its overarching story. The show was revived thirteen years later with a darker, more mature fifth season that provided a conclusion to the series, with Williams Street assisting in production; the fifth season premiered on Cartoon Network's Adult Swim as part of its Toonami programming block on March 11, 2017, and concluded with its final episode on May 20, 2017. Episodes were directed by Tartakovsky, often in collaboration with others.

Samurai Jack won eight Primetime Emmy Awards, including Outstanding Animated Program, as well as six Annie Awards and an OIAF Award. It is widely considered to be one of the greatest animated series of all time.

== Premise ==
"Long ago in a distant land, I, Aku, the shapeshifting master of darkness, unleashed an unspeakable evil, but a foolish samurai warrior wielding a magic sword stepped forth to oppose me. Before the final blow was struck, I tore open a portal in time and flung him into the future where my evil is law. Now the fool seeks to return to the past and undo the future that is Aku!"

— Aku's opening narration.

Samurai Jack tells the story of an unnamed young prince from a kingdom set in feudal Japan, whose father, the emperor of Japan, was given a magical katana from a trinity of gods—Ra, Rama, and Odin—that he could and had used to defeat and imprison the supernatural shapeshifting demon Aku. Eight years later Aku was freed, took over the land and held the Emperor hostage, but not before the prince was sent away by his mother to travel so that he could train around the world and return with the magic sword to defeat Aku. On his return, the prince-turned-samurai faced and almost vanquished Aku, but before he could deliver the final blow, the demon exiles him to the distant future, anticipating that he would be able to deal with the samurai by that time.

The era in which the samurai arrives is a retrofuturistic dystopia where Aku reigns supreme. He has also conquered the universe, allowing criminals, mercenaries and bounty hunters from other planets to do whatever they please on Earth. The first people the samurai encounters call him "Jack" as a form of slang, which he adopts as his name; his given name is never revealed. Jack only has his kimono, geta and sword to his avail in his adventures. Most episodes depict Jack overcoming various obstacles in his quest to travel back to his own time and vanquish Aku; his quest is prolonged occasionally by moments where either he nearly succeeds in returning to his own time, or conversely, Aku nearly succeeds in defeating Jack, only to be undermined by the unexpected.

=== Cast and characters ===
==== Main ====
- Samurai Jack (voiced by Phil LaMarr) – A feudal Japanese prince trained to be an elite samurai warrior. He is armed with a magical katana that can cut through virtually anything and is the only weapon that can vanquish Aku.
- Aku (voiced by Mako in Seasons 1–4, Greg Baldwin in Season 5) – An evil shapeshifting demon born from an ancient and cosmic black mass who exiled Jack to the distant future, where he reigns supreme and seeks to defeat the samurai. He is invulnerable to every type of weapon except for Jack's magic sword.
- Ashi (voiced by Tara Strong, Season 5) – One of the seven septuplet daughters of the High Priestess of the Daughters of Aku, an all-female Aku-worshipping cult, who were trained since birth to kill Jack. She allies with Jack after learning of his and Aku's true natures and becomes his love interest.

==== Recurring ====
- The Scotsman (voiced by John DiMaggio) – A robust, aggressive, stereotypically Scottish man who fights using an enchanted claymore and a submachine gun for a prosthetic leg, and becomes a close ally of Jack's.
- The Emperor (voiced by Sab Shimono, Keone Young (1 episode)) – Jack's father, who originally created Aku by accident but vanquished him with help from the gods Odin, Ra and Rama, who forged the magic sword.

=== Setting ===
Besides humans, the retro-futuristic world of the future is inhabited by a variety of denizens, such as robots, extraterrestrials, anthropomorphic animals, monsters, magical beings and deities. Some areas may have advanced technologies like flying cars, while others resemble ancient times or are in industrial conditions. Moreover, Aku has brought aliens from other planets to inhabit Earth, after destroying the habitability of their home worlds. Criminals and fugitives of all kinds are very common on his Earth, including bounty hunters who voluntarily hunt for Jack in exchange for a cash reward. Mythological and supernatural creatures make regular appearances and coexist among the technologically advanced inhabitants.

Despite highly advanced levels of technological advancement, there are still uninhabited areas of the world. Those include forests, jungles, and mountains, which have remained largely untouched even as Aku began his conquest and reign over every sentient being. A few communities of intelligent creatures, like Shaolin monks, have also remained largely left alone in spite of Aku's reign.

== Production ==
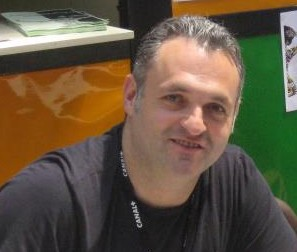
Series creator Genndy Tartakovsky in 2012

Samurai Jack was created by Genndy Tartakovsky as a follow-up to his successful series Dexter's Laboratory. Cartoon Network executive Mike Lazzo recalled Tartakovsky pitching him the series: "He said, 'Hey, remember David Carradine in Kung Fu? Wasn't that cool?' and I was like, 'Yeah, that's really cool.' That was literally the pitch." Tartakovsky wanted to do something different after working on Dexter's Laboratory and The Powerpuff Girls. Tartakovsky said of the pitch, "It could backfire. People could say, 'I don't get it. There's hardly any dialogue.' But to me that just makes it more compelling." Lazzo supported Tartakovsky's efforts, calling him "an architect of the success of the Cartoon Network." According to Betty Cohen, then-president of Cartoon Network Worldwide, Samurai Jack was greenlit for 26 episodes before its pilot was produced, a decision Cohen attributed to Tartakovsky's success with Dexter's Laboratory. Cartoon Network billed it as a series "that is cinematic in scope and that incorporates action, humor, and intricate artistry."

The premise of Samurai Jack came from Tartakovsky's childhood fascination with Japanese samurai culture and the bushido code, as well as a recurring dream where he wandered a post-apocalyptic Earth with a samurai sword and traveled the world fighting mutants with his crush. The show is inspired by 1970s cinematography, as well as classic Hollywood films such as Ben-Hur, Lawrence of Arabia, and Spartacus. Thematic and visual inspirations came from Frank Miller's comic book series Rōnin, including the premise of a master-less, nameless samurai warrior thrown into a dystopic future in order to battle a shapeshifting demon. Similarly, the episode "Jack and the Spartans" was specifically inspired by Miller's graphic novel 300 that retold the Battle of Thermopylae. The Japanese manga Lone Wolf and Cub and films by Akira Kurosawa were also inspirations. Animation services were handled by Rough Draft Korea and Digital eMation.

The network announced the series' launch at a press conference on February 21, 2001. Weeks leading up to the series were accompanied by a sweepstakes giveaway sponsored by AOL in which the grand prize was a trip for four to Japan. AOL subscribers were offered sneak peeks of Samurai Jack as well as a look at samurai traditions, future toys, behind-the-scenes model sheets, and exclusive Cartoon Orbit cToons. A CD-ROM containing clips of the premiere movie and a countdown clock until the series' premiere was distributed as part of AOL 6.0's release. Samurai Jack debuted on Cartoon Network on August 10, 2001, with the three-part special "The Beginning". Following the completion of 52 episodes over four seasons, Tartakovsky and the crew moved on to other projects. The show ended with the airing of the four final episodes as a marathon on September 25, 2004.

In Canada, Samurai Jack initially aired on YTV, and currently airs on the Canadian version of Adult Swim. In the United Kingdom, the series previously aired on Cartoon Network, and currently airs on the streaming service All 4.

=== Conclusion ===
The original series was left open-ended after the conclusion of the fourth season. Tartakovsky said, "coming close to [the end of] the fourth season, we're like, 'are we gonna finish it?' And I didn't know... The network didn't know, they were going through a lot of transitions also. So I decided, you know, I don't want to rush and finish the whole story, and so we just left it like there is no conclusion and then [the final episode is] just like another episode". Art director Scott Wills added, "We didn't have time to think about it, because we went right into Clone Wars. They even overlapped, I think. There was no time to even think about it."

=== Cancelled film ===
A film intended to conclude the story of Samurai Jack had been in development at different times by four different studios. As early as 2002, Cartoon Network was producing a Samurai Jack live-action feature film in association with New Line Cinema, with Brett Ratner hired as a director. Tartakovsky said in a 2006 interview that the live-action version of Samurai Jack was thankfully abandoned, and that "we will finish the story, and there will be an animated film." Fred Seibert announced in 2007 that the newly formed Frederator Films was developing a Samurai Jack movie, which was planned to be in stereoscopic 2D with a budget of $20 million. Seibert said in 2009 the film was being co-produced with J. J. Abrams' Bad Robot Productions. Sony Pictures expressed its interest to produce the film.

Tartakovsky said of the Samurai Jack movie in a 2012 interview with IGN:

I've been trying so hard every year, and the one amazing thing about Jack is that I did it in 2001, you know, and it still survived. There's something about it that's connected with people. And I want it, it's number 1 on my list, and now Bob Osher, the president, is like 'Hey, let's talk about Jack. Let's see what we can do.' And I go, 'You're going to do a 2D feature animated movie?' and he's like, 'Yeah. Maybe. Let's do some research and let's see.' So it's not dead for sure by any means, and it's still on the top of my list, and I'm trying as hard as I can.

Tartakovsky said the loss of Mako (Aku's voice actor) would also need to be addressed. The feature film project never materialized, and eventually, the series concluded with a fifth television season.

=== Revival ===
Samurai Jack returned to television over twelve years after its fourth season concluded, with the first episode of its fifth season airing on Adult Swim on March 11, 2017. Produced at Cartoon Network Studios and Williams Street with Tartakovsky as executive producer, the fifth and final season featured a darker, more mature tone and a cohesive narrative that concluded Jack's journey. Set approximately 50 years after the original four seasons, Jack, who has not aged as a side effect of time travel, has lost his sword and has given up hope of ever returning home with no time portals left in existence. However, he begins to regain his sense of purpose when, after he kills six out of seven septuplet sisters sent to kill him by the Daughters of Aku, an all-female Aku-worshipping cult, he convinces the sole survivor, Ashi, to join his cause. Phil LaMarr reprises his role as Jack; Greg Baldwin provides the voice of Aku, as Mako, who voiced Aku in the show's first four seasons, had died ten years before the revival was produced. However, the original seasons' opening narration, provided by Mako, is used for Aku's past self in the series finale.

== Episodes ==
| Season | Episodes | Originally released | | |
| Season | Episodes | First released | Last released | Network |
|---|---|---|---|---|
| 1 | 13 | August 10, 2001 | December 3, 2001 | Cartoon Network |
| 2 | 13 | March 1, 2002 | October 11, 2002 | Cartoon Network |
| 3 | 13 | October 18, 2002 | August 16, 2003 | Cartoon Network |
| 4 | 13 | June 14, 2003 | September 25, 2004 | Cartoon Network |
| 5 | 10 | March 11, 2017 | May 20, 2017 | Adult Swim |

== Reception ==
=== Critical reception ===
The show's original 2001 premiere received four award nominations, and was released as a standalone VHS and DVD on March 19, 2002. Steven Linan of the Los Angeles Times said of the 90-minute premiere, "One can quibble with some of the dialogue, which sounds like something you'd hear in Karate Kid 2 ('Let the sword guide you to your fate, but let your mind set free the path to your destiny'). Nonetheless, there is one highly unconventional aspect of the series which sets it apart from others—its willingness to go for extensive stretches in which there is no dialogue."

In 2004, British broadcaster Channel 4 ran a poll of the 100 greatest cartoons, in which Samurai Jack achieved the 42nd position. The show was ranked eleventh by IGN in its list of the "Top 25 Primetime Animated Series of All Time" in 2006. In its list ranking, IGN compared the series' writing style to Tartakovsky's Star Wars: Clone Wars, stating, "episodes have little or no dialogue, relying instead on action and strong visuals to tell the stories. Entertaining for adults, yet not too violent for kids." The review went on to say that the series' "unique combination of cinematic and comic book styles appeals to all ages." IGN also ranked the show 43rd in its "Top 100 Animated Series" list in 2009, stating that its "simple and colorful art style lends itself well to the cinematic scope and frenetic action sequences that fill each episode." IGN's review also stated that the series' "unique style and humor make the most out of the animation format, producing elaborate action sequences and bizarre situations that would be impossible to do in a live action film."

On review aggregator site Rotten Tomatoes, the series has an approval rating of 93%. The first season received an approval rating of 80% while the fourth and fifth seasons received an approval rating of 100%. The fifth season's critical consensus reads, "An increasing intensity and maturity are evident in Samurai Jack's beautifully animated, action-packed, and overall compelling fifth season."

Matt Zoller Seitz, a film critic for RogerEbert.com and television critic for Vulture, considers Samurai Jack, along with Tartakovsky's Star Wars: Clone Wars, to be a masterwork and one of the greatest American animated shows on television, mainly for its visual style. Entertainment Weekly ranked Samurai Jack third on its list of the "10 Best Cartoon Network Shows" in 2012.

Samurai Jack would later be included in Seitz and Alan Sepinwall's 2016 book TV (The Book) as an honorable mention following the 100 greatest television series.

=== Accolades ===
| Year | Award | Category | Nominee(s) | Result |
|---|---|---|---|---|
| 2002 | Annie Award | Outstanding Character Design in an Animated Television Production | Lynne Naylor (for "Jack and the Warrior Woman") | Nominated |
| 2002 | Annie Award | Outstanding Music in an Animated Television Production | James L. Venable (for "The Beginning") | Won |
| 2002 | Annie Award | Outstanding Production Design in an Animated Television Production | Dan Krall (for "The Beginning") | Won |
| 2002 | Annie Award | Outstanding Production Design in an Animated Television Production | Scott Wills (for "The Beginning") | Nominated |
| 2002 | Annie Award | Outstanding Storyboarding in an Animated Television Production | Bryan Andrews (for "Jack and the Three Blind Archers") | Won |
| 2002 | OIAF Award | Best Television Series | Genndy Tartakovsky (for "Jack and the Three Blind Archers") | Won |
| 2002 | Annecy Official Selection | Special Award for Television Series | Genndy Tartakovsky (for "Jack and the Three Blind Archers") | Won |
| 2002 | Primetime Emmy Award | Outstanding Animated Program (For Programming One Hour or More) | Brian A. Miller, Yu Mun Jeong, Yeol Jung Chang, Paul Rudish, Genndy Tartakovsky, Bong Koh Jae (for "The Beginning, Parts 1–3") | Nominated |
| 2002 | TCA Award | Outstanding Achievement in Children's Programming | Samurai Jack | Nominated |
| 2003 | Annie Award | Outstanding Achievement in an Animated Television Production | Cartoon Network Studios | Nominated |
| 2003 | Annie Award | Outstanding Character Design in an Animated Television Production | Andy Suriano (for "Jack and the Haunted House") | Won |
| 2003 | Annie Award | Outstanding Directing in an Animated Television Production | Genndy Tartakovsky and Robert Alvarez (for "The Birth of Evil") | Nominated |
| 2003 | Annie Award | Outstanding Production Design in an Animated Television Production | Scott Wills (for "The Birth of Evil") | Won |
| 2003 | Primetime Emmy Award | Outstanding Individual Achievement in Animation | Scott Wills (for "Jack and the Traveling Creatures") | Won |
| 2003 | Primetime Emmy Award | Outstanding Individual Achievement in Animation | Dan Krall (for "Jack and the Spartans") | Won |
| 2004 | Annie Award | Outstanding Directing in a Television Production | Genndy Tartakovsky (for "Tale of X-49") | Nominated |
| 2004 | Annie Award | Outstanding Production Design in a Television Production | Richard Daskas (for "Seasons of Death") | Won |
| 2004 | Primetime Emmy Award | Outstanding Animated Program (For Programming Less Than One Hour) | Genndy Tartakovsky, Brian A. Miller, Don Shank, Robert Alvarez, Randy Myers, Yu Mun Jeong, Bong Koh Jae, James T. Walker (for "The Birth of Evil") | Won |
| 2005 | Primetime Emmy Award | Outstanding Animated Program (For Programming Less Than One Hour) | Genndy Tartakovsky, Brian A. Miller, Bryan Andrews, Mark Andrews, Hueng-soon Park, Kwang-bae Park, Randy Myers, James T. Walker (for "Seasons of Death") | Nominated |
| 2005 | Primetime Emmy Award | Outstanding Individual Achievement in Animation | Bryan Andrews (for "Seasons of Death") | Won |
| 2017 | Primetime Emmy Award | Outstanding Individual Achievement in Animation | Bryan Andrews (for "Episode XCIII") | Won |
| 2017 | Primetime Emmy Award | Outstanding Individual Achievement in Animation | Scott Willis (for "Episode XCIII") | Won |
| 2017 | Primetime Emmy Award | Outstanding Individual Achievement in Animation | Craig Kellman (for "Episode XCII") | Won |
| 2017 | Primetime Emmy Award | Outstanding Individual Achievement in Animation | Lou Romano (for "Episode XCV") | Won |

== Other media ==
=== Board game ===
A year after the series was concluded, a board game adaptation covering all five seasons was released, titled Samurai Jack: Back to the Past. Players work together to complete tasks to help Jack return to the past while competing to earn honor for their actions.

=== Comics ===
In February 2013, IDW Publishing announced a partnership with Cartoon Network to produce comics based on its properties, and Samurai Jack was one of the titles announced to be published. It was further announced at WonderCon 2013 that the first issue of Samurai Jack would debut in October 2013. The first comic in the series was released on October 23, 2013. The final issue was released in May 2015. On October 25, 2016, IDW re-released all of the issues in a compilation entitled "Tales of a Wandering Warrior". Tartakovsky does not consider the comics part of the story of Jack.

Jack also appeared in multiple issues of DC Comics' anthology comic series Cartoon Network Action Pack, which ran from May 10, 2006, to March 14, 2012.

=== Home media ===
Like other previous Cartoon Network shows, Samurai Jack DVDs were released by Warner Home Video between 2002 and 2007. The DVDs include episode numbers in Roman numerals as they appear at the end of each episode but remain untitled. Season 1 was released on Netflix in 2013. Samurai Jack: The Complete Series was released on Blu-ray and Digital HD on October 17, 2017, and contains remastered versions of the first four seasons of the series, courtesy of ACMEworks Digital Film, Inc. The series was also made available on HBO Max on May 27, 2020.

Samurai Jack VHS and DVD releases
| Product | Episodes | Release date | | Description |
| Product | Episodes | Region 1 | Region 4 | Description |
|---|---|---|---|---|
| The Premiere Movie | 4 | March 19, 2002 | October 10, 2007 | Available on DVD and VHS, this release includes the first 3 episodes of season 1 ("The Beginning" (I–III)) as well as the episode "Jack and the Scotsman" (XI) in Dolby Digital 5.1 sound. |
| The Complete First Season | 13 | May 4, 2004 | November 7, 2007 | Includes all 13 episodes from season 1, a "making-of" documentary, an original animation test, original artwork, and commentary on "Jack and the Three Blind Archers" (VII). |
| The Complete Second Season | 13 | May 24, 2005 | March 4, 2009 | Includes all 13 episodes from season 2, commentary on "Jack and the Spartans" (XXV), "Creator Scrapbook", and an original pitch for "Jack and the Scotsman, Part 2" (XVII). |
| The Complete Third Season | 13 | May 23, 2006 | September 9, 2009 | Includes all 13 episodes from season 3, commentary on "The Birth of Evil" (XXXVII/XXXVIII), "Lost Artwork" and a featurette called "Martial Arts of the Samurai". |
| The Complete Fourth Season | 13 | August 28, 2007 | October 3, 2012 | Includes all 13 episodes from season 4, "Genndy's Roundtable", "Genndy's New Project" (a tour of Orphanage Animation Studios), alternate takes for two snippets of "The Tale of X-49" (L) and Samurai Jack promos. |
| Samurai Jack and Friends | 7 | October 7, 2014 | —N/a | A re-issue of the first disc of season two, containing its first seven episodes. |
| The Complete Fifth Season | 10 | October 17, 2017 | —N/a | Includes all 10 episodes from season 5, "The Evolution of Jack", and detailed reviews of the storyboards of five of this season's episodes (XCIV, XCVI, XCVIII, XCIX and C). |

Other releases including Samurai Jack episodes
| Product | Episodes | Release date | | | Features |
| Product | Episodes | Region 1 | Region 2 | Region 4 | Features |
|---|---|---|---|---|---|
| 4 Kid Favorites: The Hall of Fame Collection Vol. 2 | 7 | March 12, 2013 | —N/a | —N/a | 4-disc compilation set includes Samurai Jack: Season One, Disc One |

Samurai Jack Blu-ray releases
| Product | Episodes | Release date | | | Features |
| Product | Episodes | Region A | Region B | Region C | Features |
|---|---|---|---|---|---|
| The Complete Series | 62 | October 17, 2017 | December 2, 2019 | —N/a | Includes all 62 Samurai Jack episodes across all 5 seasons, all remastered on Blu-ray in high definition, a first for the previous four seasons. All special features from previous releases are included in this box set, along with new cover art for the prior 4 seasons, steelbook art for the first season's cover and redemption codes for UltraViolet digital versions of all episodes. |
| The Complete Fifth Season | 10 | October 17, 2017 | —N/a | —N/a | This Blu-ray includes all 10 episodes from season 5, along with the same special features as the DVD version. |

=== Video games ===
Samurai Jack was adapted in the video games Samurai Jack: The Amulet of Time for the Game Boy Advance in 2003 and Samurai Jack: The Shadow of Aku for the GameCube and PlayStation 2 in 2004. A third game, Samurai Jack: Battle Through Time, was released on August 21, 2020, for Microsoft Windows, PlayStation 4, Xbox One, Nintendo Switch, and Apple Arcade.

Elements of the Samurai Jack concept were reused in other Cartoon Network video games. The MMORPG FusionFall features Jack, the Scotsman, and Demongo as non-playable characters, while Aku is a Nano. The fighting game Cartoon Network: Punch Time Explosion for the Nintendo 3DS, Wii, PlayStation 3, and Xbox 360 features Jack and the Scotsman as playable characters while Aku is a playable character, an assist character, and a boss. The platform fighter MultiVersus featured Jack as a playable character. He has also been made into a playable character in Fortnite.
