= Samurai Jack: Battle Through Time =

2020 video game

Samurai Jack - Battle Through Time
- Developer: Soleil (Note: iOS port co-developed by Soleil Ltd. and Novarama.)
- Publisher: Adult Swim Games
- Director: Hiroaki Matsui
- Producer: Yoshifuru Okamoto
- Designer: Noboru Matsumoto
- Programmer: Yoshihiro Ueno
- Artist: Marcos Ramos
- Writer: Darrick Bachman
- Composers: Yuichi Baba; Masanori Otsuka; Hiroshi Watanabe; Tomoyo Nishimoto; Shinya Chikamori; Akari Kaida
- Series: Samurai Jack
- Engine: Unreal Engine 4
- Platforms: iOS; macOS; Nintendo Switch; PlayStation 4; Windows; Xbox One
- Release: WW: August 21, 2020; JP: January 21, 2021 (NS and PS4)
- Genres: Action-adventure, hack and slash
- Mode: Single-player

Samurai Jack: Battle Through Time is a 2020 action-adventure video game developed by Soleil and published by Adult Swim Games. It is based on the American animated television series Samurai Jack. The game serves as an alternative scenario that takes place during the show's series finale in its final season; the show's creator, Genndy Tartakovsky, confirmed it to be canon to the series. It was released on August 21, 2020, for iOS and macOS (through Apple Arcade), Nintendo Switch, PlayStation 4, Windows, and Xbox One, and received generally positive reviews from critics.

== Gameplay ==
In Battle Through Time, the player controls Samurai Jack, the main protagonist of his titular animated series, and fights through locations and events that are familiar in his prior adventures in Aku's sinister future that he spends much of the series finding a way out of. In each of the nine levels of the main story campaign, players must guide Jack along a mostly linear path, with occasional branching side paths where secrets and pickups can be found. In some levels, the camera may shift to a 2.5D perspective where Jack can only move forward or backward. Throughout the process, Jack will be trapped in small areas and must engage in combat with Aku's minions and familiar foes in his quest, with the player being able to choose from a variety of melee and ranged weapons to defeat them all in order to advance. Each weapon has different strengths and weaknesses, and most of them have limited durability except Jack's magic katana and his bare fists. In melee combat, Jack can create powerful combo attacks by mixing light and heavy attacks after circumventing or breaking enemy blocks and deliver devastating damage with a special kiai attack after gathering enough strength, while blocking and dodging to defend himself. In ranged combat, Jack can use throwing weapons, archery equipment or firearms, all constrained by either ammunition and/or durability limits. While using a bow and arrow, he can aim more precisely. Jack can also collect different items throughout the environments to spend them on skill tree upgrades that can improve his combat abilities. At the end of each level, and sometimes within levels, Jack will be pitted against more familiar adversaries he previously faced in boss battles that will challenge his combat skills and his resolve. If Jack is defeated in battle after losing health, which can be replenished by consuming items, play resumes from the last checkpoint he passed. Outside of battles, Jack can occasionally find treasure chests and friendly non-player characters based on the allies he befriended on his quest. Hint-giving characters include Sir Rothchild, the leader of the anthropomorphic dog archaeologists; the Scotsman, Jack's best friend and fellow swordsman; and Flora, the de facto leader of the Scotsman's army of daughters. Da' Samurai, a self-absorbed samurai wannabe, can provide or sell Jack weapons and items to give him advantages in combat. In some instances, Jack will need to use some platforming or other non-combat means to overcome obstacles. At the completion of each level, players will be scored on their clear time and combat performance, with penalties for using items or being defeated in battle. There are four levels of difficulty ("Jack", "Samurai", "Master Samurai" and "Master of Masters") that affect enemy frequency and strength, with only the first three available from the beginning. After the story mode is completed, the player can then unlock a series of bonus arena-based challenges, with their difficulty uniquely shaped by certain restrictions and modifiers.

== Plot ==
During the events of the series finale of the fifth season, Samurai Jack's love interest Ashi uses her abilities inherited by Aku, her demon father and Jack's archenemy responsible for his temporal displacement, to warp herself and Jack back to the latter's proper place in time. However, Aku makes one final bid to stop Jack by shooting a laser through the time portal to divert him to a "timeless realm" without any past or future, filled with locales and characters from Jack's past adventures.

Jack first lands in the mines where he once helped dog archaeologists led by Sir Rothchild defend against Aku's beetle drones in his first major battle in the future. After defeating the beetle drone army again without their help, Jack ends up in a swamp infested with robot alligators: the site of his first battle alongside the Scotsman, whom he finds wearing a mind-controlling pendant bearing Aku's visage. After fighting and freeing the Scotsman and destroying the pendant, Jack is transported to the Castle of Boon, where he helped the Scotsman rescue his wife. Here, Aku personally informs Jack of the timeless realm, warning him that everything familiar may not be what it seems. Upon eliminating Celtic demons and rescuing the Scotsman's daughters, including Flora, Jack travels up a mountain, fighting bounty hunters along the way, before battling a giant Binary Beetle at its summit, powered by an Aku pendant that Jack destroys. He is then whisked to the Cave of the Ancient, where he hears the voice of the Ancient King, a Viking warrior he once freed from being imprisoned in a rock body. Following an encounter with Demongo the Soul Collector, Jack discovers that the Ancient King is controlled by yet another Aku pendant and defeats him again to take and destroy the pendant, sending himself to a large cemetery full of dust zombies, where Aku once nearly killed him. Battling the zombies throughout the cemetery, Jack eventually faces down the witch hag he once encountered there, empowered by another Aku pendant that Jack destroys to be warped to Aku City. Traveling underground and aboveground, Jack fends off familiar foes, including the Imakandi hunters, and eventually crosses paths with Ezekiel and Josephine Clench, a bounty hunter couple whom he must battle again on a train out of the city. Defeating them and leaving them at the mercy of robot alligators, Jack recovers an Aku pendant from them and destroys it, unaware it is the last one. As more pendants are destroyed, the timeless realm weakens a little, and Jack catches glimpses of Ashi, Aku, and his way out.

Following the pendants' destruction, Jack starts reliving some events of the final season with his appearance from its first seven episodes. He goes through a ruined city while wearing mechanical samurai armor to confront robot assassin Scaramouche, then journeys through a forest and a temple to battle the Daughters of Aku. He reminds the daughters that he had defeated them before and encourages them to choose another path, but he is forced to kill them all, including whom he believes is Ashi herself after Aku shoves her into his sword. Jack expresses guilt over killing Ashi and despair over being trapped in the timeless realm, but a vision of his familiar appearance encourages him to forget about the past and reminds him that Aku is already losing and knows how powerful Jack really is. The two Jacks merge into his familiar appearance again. The mortally wounded Ashi returns after Jack defeats the monstrous Lazarus-92 once more in its crashed prison ship and tries to shame Jack about killing her before transforming into her demonic form and fighting him in the robot graveyard where he once faced its time portal's guardian. Jack discovers that this Ashi is not real, as the real Ashi suddenly breaks into the realm to destroy her. She then opens a portal for Jack to go to Aku's tower. Sir Rothchild, the Scotsman, Flora, and Da' Samurai arrive to fight Aku's massive armies, freeing Jack to enter the tower himself to challenge Aku. As he fights more enemies in the several levels of the tower and finishes Demongo once and for all, Jack finds and battles Aku at the top of the tower. Upon destroying Aku, the timeless realm collapses, allowing Jack to rejoin Ashi in the time portal he was using and return to feudal Japan, where he destroys Aku for good. This leads to the remaining events of the series finale, including Ashi's demise due to the grandfather paradox.

If the player collects all the kamons belonging to Jack's father but corrupted by Aku, they can unlock an alternate ending where Jack and Ashi live together happily ever after regardless of Aku's destruction thanks to the time pocket copy of the future preventing Ashi's nonexistence.

== Development ==
According to an interview, the show's creator, Genndy Tartakovsky was initially disinterested and wanted nothing to do with the game, believing it to be a mediocre cash grab like the previous games The Amulet of Time and The Shadow of Aku. However, the game's publisher Adult Swim Games were insistent that developer Soleil could deliver a quality product. Soleil was a subsidiary of the Japanese video game developer Valhalla Game Studios at the time, with founder Tomonobu Itagaki serving as an advisor as one of his last games before his 2025 death.

After being persuaded by the publisher, Tartakovsky enlisted season five head writer Darrick Bachman to keep the game's writing authentic to the series and to write around the perimeters set by the game's publisher for the developers, which was to include elements from all five seasons. The story is considered a part of season five by the creators.

== Release ==
The game released digitally on most major platforms on August 21, 2020. On August 14, 2020, Limited Run Games sold pre-orders for physical copies for non-Microsoft consoles. The physical editions could be bought with just the game on its own or a collector's edition with the game and other physical extras like the soundtrack, a statue, a poster, and more. In Japan, the game was first released as a timed Xbox One exclusive, with the non-Microsoft console versions being released on January 21, 2021, on physical and digital formats.

On December 23, 2024, the game was removed from all digital stores across all platforms, alongside several other Cartoon Network video games.

== Reception ==
Reception

Aggregate scores
Aggregator	Score
Metacritic	NS: 70/100; PC: 76/100; PS4: 67/100; XONE: 75/100
OpenCritic	58% recommend

Review scores
Publication	Score
Destructoid	4.5/10
IGN	8/10
Nintendo Life	7/10
Nintendo World Report	7/10

Samurai Jack: Battle Through Time received "generally favorable" reviews on the PC and Xbox One, and received "mixed or average" reviews on the PlayStation 4 and Nintendo Switch, according to review aggregator website Metacritic. Fellow review aggregator OpenCritic assessed that the game received fair approval, being recommended by 58% of critics.
