= Samurai Jack: The Amulet of Time =

2003 action video game based on Samurai Jack

- Developer: Virtucraft Studios
- Publisher: BAM! Entertainment
- Producer: Heidi Behrendy
- Designer: Matthew Smith
- Programmers: Tony Stockton; David May; Paul Flint
- Artists: Paul Scott; Mike Hanson; Paul Windett; Lee Cawley; Marcus Russell
- Composer: Paul Tonge
- Series: Samurai Jack
- Platform: Game Boy Advance
- Release: NA: March 25, 2003
- Genres: Action, Metroidvania
- Mode: Single-player

Samurai Jack: The Amulet of Time is an action video game developed by British studio Virtucraft and published by BAM! Entertainment (European distribution handled by Acclaim Entertainment) for the Game Boy Advance. Based on the animated series Samurai Jack, the game came about after a licensing agreement deal was reached between Cartoon Network and BAM! Entertainment in January 2002. It was released worldwide on March 25, 2003, and is the first of three official Samurai Jack video games.

== Gameplay ==
The game follows Jack's quest through seven areas to obtain the elemental gem pieces of an amulet that can send him back to his own time. As more gemstones are collected, the player unlocks more of Jack's weapons and abilities, such as a super jump and a battle hammer.

== Reception ==
Reception

Aggregate score
Aggregator	Score
Metacritic	63/100

Review scores
Publication	Score
Game Informer	8/10
GamePro	1.5/5
GameSpy	3/5
GameZone	5.5/10
IGN	6/10
Nintendo Power	3.2/5
Nintendo World Report	8/10

The game received "mixed" reviews according to the review aggregation website Metacritic. IGN's Craig Harris cited the game's similarities to Metroid and recent Castlevania games as good design, but said the game lacked originality.
