= List of Samurai Jack episodes =

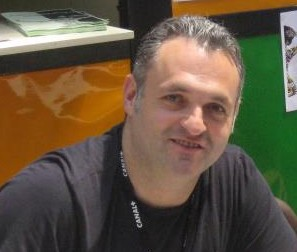
Samurai Jack creator Genndy Tartakovsky.

Samurai Jack is an American animated television series created by animator Genndy Tartakovsky that aired on Cartoon Network from August 10, 2001, to September 25, 2004. The series follows a feudal Japanese prince trained to be a samurai warrior, who tries to destroy the supernatural evil being Aku to protect his homeland but is teleported into a distant future where Aku rules the world. The young man adopts the name "Jack" after an encounter with the youth of the future, and he embarks on a perpetual quest to return to his own time and undo Aku's tyranny.

Samurai Jack aired for four seasons that span 52 episodes. A fifth season spanning 10 episodes premiered on Adult Swim's Toonami block on March 11, 2017, and concluded on May 20, 2017.

All five seasons are available on Region 1 DVD. A compilation featuring the first three episodes was released as a stand-alone movie titled Samurai Jack: The Premiere Movie on VHS and DVD on March 19, 2002.

== Series overview ==
| Season | Episodes | Originally released | | |
| Season | Episodes | First released | Last released | Network |
|---|---|---|---|---|
| 1 | 13 | August 10, 2001 | December 3, 2001 | Cartoon Network |
| 2 | 13 | March 1, 2002 | October 11, 2002 | Cartoon Network |
| 3 | 13 | October 18, 2002 | August 16, 2003 | Cartoon Network |
| 4 | 13 | June 14, 2003 | September 25, 2004 | Cartoon Network |
| 5 | 10 | March 11, 2017 | May 20, 2017 | Adult Swim |

== Episodes ==
All episodes are identified in the credits by Roman numerals, which correspond to the total number of episodes released until the fifth season, which adds 40 to the number of the season 4 finale, LII (52), to start the numeration of its episodes at XCII (92) to reflect the long passage of time between seasons 4 and 5. All episodes from the first four seasons also have an alternate, more descriptive title.

=== Season 1 (2001) ===
| No. overall | No. in season | Title | Directed by | Storyboarded and Written by | Original release date |
|---|---|---|---|---|---|
| 1 | 1 | "Samurai Jack: The Premiere Movie" | Genndy Tartakovsky | Paul Rudish and Genndy Tartakovsky | August 10, 2001 |
| 2 | 2 | "Samurai Jack: The Premiere Movie" | Genndy Tartakovsky | Paul Rudish and Genndy Tartakovsky | August 10, 2001 |
| 3 | 3 | "Samurai Jack: The Premiere Movie" | Genndy Tartakovsky | Paul Rudish and Genndy Tartakovsky | August 10, 2001 |
Part I: The Beginning – A solar eclipse releases Aku, an evil shapeshifting demon, from being sealed below the Earth; he devastates a Japanese kingdom and abducts the Emperor, whose wife sends their young son to train around the world to become an elite samurai warrior. Upon reaching adulthood, he receives a mystical katana able to cut through virtually anything, frees his people from Aku's minions, and battles Aku despite his father's warnings about Aku's deceptive nature. Before the prince can strike the killing blow, Aku creates a time portal that sends the samurai into the future. Part II: The Samurai Called Jack – The samurai is plunged into a dystopian world ruled by Aku, adopting the name "Jack" upon hearing several aliens call him the name. Following a nightclub brawl, he meets three dog archaeologists and offers to protect them from Aku's forces, who have taken over their dig site to claim valuable crystals. Part III: The First Fight – Armed with various weapons and traps, Jack single-handledly defeats Aku's beetle drones to free the dog archaeologists. He subsequently vows to fight the demon's oppression until he can return to the past.
| 4 | 4 | "Jack, the Woolies and the Chritchellites" | Randy Myers and Genndy Tartakovsky | Chris Reccardi and Chris Mitchell | August 13, 2001 |
Jack helps free the Woolies, a race of enormous, hairy beasts, from being enslaved by Chritchellite aliens. In return, Lazzor, the eldest of the Woolies, offers to help Jack find a way home.
| 5 | 5 | "Jack in Space" | Rob Renzetti and Genndy Tartakovsky | Charlie Bean and Carey Yost | August 27, 2001 |
After accidentally exposing a colony of scientists seeking to escape Earth, Jack trains as an astronaut to protect them from Aku's robots. He gives up an opportunity to return home so they can fly away to a distant planet safely by defending their ship from mechanical insects.
| 6 | 6 | "Jack and the Warrior Woman" | Rob Renzetti and Genndy Tartakovsky | Mike Manley and Genndy Tartakovsky | November 19, 2001 |
A talented warrior named Ikra joins Jack as he seeks a magical jewel that could send him back to his own time. The jewel judges Ikra to be impure of heart and spawns a monster she defeats. She then destroys the jewel, revealing "herself" as Aku and derailing Jack's quest.
| 7 | 7 | "Jack and the Three Blind Archers" | Genndy Tartakovsky | Mark Andrews and Bryan Andrews | August 20, 2001 |
Jack learns of a powerful wishing well that could return him to the past but is guarded by three deadly archers. He recalls training with a blindfold to hone his other senses besides sight and dodges the archers' attacks to free them from being controlled by the evil spirit in the well that blinded them, which he destroys since it binds those who wish on it to do its bidding.
| 8 | 8 | "Jack vs. Mad Jack" | Randy Myers and Genndy Tartakovsky | Chris Mitchell and Carey Yost | October 15, 2001 |
Angered by the failure of his bounty hunters and mercenaries to defeat Jack, Aku uses the samurai's negative emotions to create an evil counterpart. Jack has trouble fighting "Mad Jack" until he relinquishes his anger, erasing Mad Jack from existence.
| 9 | 9 | "Jack Under the Sea" | Rob Renzetti and Genndy Tartakovsky | Chris Reccardi and Charlie Bean | September 3, 2001 |
When Jack hears rumors of a time portal being found in the underwater city of Oceanus, he journeys to the city and is welcomed by its alien inhabitants, the Triceraquins, including "Ringo", "Guinness", and "Connery". He learns the so-called portal is a trap planted by Aku, who breaks a pact he made with the Triceraquins, prompting Jack to fight to save them.
| 10 | 10 | "Jack and the Lava Monster" | Robert Alvarez and Genndy Tartakovsky | Mike Manley | October 12, 2001 |
Jack follows a mysterious voice into a volcano and survives boobytraps to meet the Ancient King, a Viking warrior trapped in a giant humanoid rock body by Aku. At the Viking's insistence, Jack reluctantly duels him and destroys the rock body. With his curse broken, the Ancient King ages rapidly but dies peacefully once Jack returns his sword, and he is carried by valkyries to Valhalla, from which he watches over Jack with his younger appearance restored.
| 11 | 11 | "Jack and the Scotsman" | Rob Renzetti and Genndy Tartakovsky | Mark Andrews and Bryan Andrews | October 29, 2001 |
While crossing a seemingly endless bridge, Jack runs into a robust, aggressive, stereotypical Scottish man who wields an enchanted claymore. Jack tries to negotiate a way for them both to peacefully cross the narrow bridge but ends up engaging the Scotsman in a long, exhausting fight without a clear victor. After realizing that Aku has placed bounties on both of them, they join forces to fight Aku's bounty hunter army and form a new friendship.
| 12 | 12 | "Jack and the Gangsters" | Randy Myers and Genndy Tartakovsky | Chris Reccardi | November 26, 2001 |
To try to get close to Aku, Jack joins some gangsters on a heist to steal the Jewel of Neptune, which can control water, from its elemental guardians. After Jack steals the jewel and the gangsters bring it to Aku's lair, he almost kills Aku before the gangsters knock him unconscious, thinking they are saving him. They lie about giving up crime to convince Jack to let them keep the jewel.
| 13 | 13 | "Aku's Fairy Tales" | Rob Renzetti and Genndy Tartakovsky | Chris Mitchell and Carey Yost | December 3, 2001 |
Seeking to weaken Jack's popularity among his subjects, Aku gathers the children of the world in his palace and tells them a series of "fairy tales", all of which portray himself as a hero and/or Jack as a villain, but the children, aware of his and Jack's natures, continuously point out the faults in his stories. A manic Aku eventually leaves in defeat while the children make up their own story about Jack slaying him.: This was the only season finale in the series to feature Aku until CI in Season 5.

=== Season 2 (2002) ===
| No. overall | No. in season | Title | Directed by | Storyboarded and Written by | Original release date |
|---|---|---|---|---|---|
| 14 | 1 | "Jack Learns to Jump Good" | Randy Myers and Genndy Tartakovsky | Bryan Andrews and Brian Larsen | March 1, 2002 |
After his lack of jumping skills costs him a chance to return home, Jack helps a peaceful tribe of ape-like creatures and their human leader, a former child slave who escaped Aku's tyranny, defend themselves against the attacks of a larger rival tribe in return for lessons on how to "jump good", which involves gravity-defying feats.
| 15 | 2 | "Jack Tales" | Rob Renzetti and Genndy Tartakovsky | Erik Wiese and Chris Mitchell | March 8, 2002 |
Three short stories are presented in the following order: Jack vs. the Worm – Jack confronts a two-headed riddling worm that could grant his wish to return home. He answers a challenging riddle and allows himself to be eaten by the worm, only to learn the worm is not magical as he finds himself among disheveled old men also tricked by the worm. The Metal-Eaters – A family that feeds on metal tries to eat Jack's sword. As Jack fights them, they are exposed as robots, who eat each other. Jack, the Gargoyle and the Fairy – Jack attempts to rescue a fairy, who can only grant one wish, from a gargoyle who has trapped her in a pendant. After he awakens and defeats the gargoyle, the fairy tells him that only the gargoyle knew the magic words to free her, so Jack, who accidentally got his hand stuck in the pendant, wishes them both free.
| 16 | 3 | "Jack and the Smackback" | Randy Myers and Genndy Tartakovsky | Chris Reccardi | March 15, 2002 |
Jack is captured and taken to the "Dome of Doom", where he is forced to fight as a gladiator against the Dome's champions. He uses various weapons to win before reclaiming his katana and ordering the arena owner to release all the captives.
| 17 | 4 | "Jack and the Scotsman II" | Randy Myers and Genndy Tartakovsky | Mark Andrews | March 22, 2002 |
The Scotsman invites Jack to help rescue his kidnapped wife from robotic Celtic demons. After Jack proves himself to the Scotsman's rowdy clan, the two venture into the Castle of Boon and save the wife from being cooked into a stew. She angrily overpowers the demon army when their leader, the Master of the Hunt, calls her "fat".
| 18 | 5 | "Jack and the Ultra-Robots" | Rob Renzetti and Genndy Tartakovsky | Bryan Andrews and Brian Larsen | March 29, 2002 |
While investigating the destruction of several scattered villages, Jack learns that Aku's new "ultra-robot" assassins, fueled by the demon's essence, are responsible. Unable to destroy them alone, he receives unexpected assistance from Extor, the mad scientist who invented them, and calls on the spirits of his ancestors to give him the strength to slay the last robot.
| 19 | 6 | "Jack Remembers the Past" | Rob Renzetti and Genndy Tartakovsky | Bryan Andrews and Brian Larsen | April 5, 2002 |
After saving a village and wandering the wilderness, Jack stumbles upon the ruins of the town where he was born and recalls three of his childhood memories: meeting his first crush while chasing a cricket; witnessing a ronin in mortal combat, which sparked his interest in swordsmanship; and outsmarting bullies who stole his favorite kemari ball, which he finds in a weathered state. A robot calling for help interrupts Jack's reminiscence, and he leaves while visions of his parents look on in pride.
| 20 | 7 | "Jack and the Monks" | Rob Renzetti and Genndy Tartakovsky | Chris Mitchell, Erik Wiese, and Charlie Bean | April 12, 2002 |
Demoralized by the destruction of yet another time portal, Jack joins three monks seeking to climb the Mountain of Fatoom in search of "truth". After fighting a number of enemies, he declares reaching the mountaintop impossible, but the monks encourage him through visions not to give up on his quest. Reaching the top, Jack regains his conviction and once again vows to destroy Aku.
| 21 | 8 | "Jack and the Dragon" | Robert Alvarez and Genndy Tartakovsky | Chris Reccardi and Aaron Springer | September 6, 2002 |
Jack discovers a village overpowered by a stench emanating from a mountain-dwelling dragon with severe indigestion. At the dragon's insistence, he navigates its complicated digestive system and finds the source of the dragon's flatulence: a baby dragon spitting fire from its partially hatched egg, whom he then frees. Despite the baby dragon setting fire around the village, the villagers rejoice that they are free from the flatulence.
| 22 | 9 | "Jack vs. the Five Hunters" | Robert Alvarez and Genndy Tartakovsky | Genndy Tartakovsky; Mike Manley (additional storyboarder) | September 13, 2002 |
Aku challenges the Imakandi, a group of highly-skilled leonine alien hunters, to capture Jack. They pursue him extensively through Aku City and eventually capture him, but because they value the thrill of hunting, they judge Jack to be a worthy enough target to go free before Aku can claim his prize.
| 23 | 10 | "Jack vs. Demongo, the Soul Collector" | Randy Myers and Genndy Tartakovsky | Mark Andrews | September 20, 2002 |
Aku sends his servant Demongo, a demon who captures and enslaves the souls of warriors to serve him, to destroy Jack. Realizing he cannot destroy the warriors' essences, Jack finds a way inside Demongo and releases numerous warriors' souls from within, allowing them to return to the physical world and overpower the demon.
| 24 | 11 | "Jack Is Naked" | Randy Myers, Robert Alvarez, and Genndy Tartakovsky | Chris Reccardi and Aaron Springer | September 27, 2002 |
Jack chases a mysterious rabbit, who stole his clothing while he was bathing, into a whimsical underground world, where he hides from authorities using various disguises. He ultimately learns the thief is an orphaned little girl seeking to sell his clothing, so he gives her tusks from a robot slug he fought earlier to help her make money.
| 25 | 12 | "Jack and the Spartans" | Randy Myers and Genndy Tartakovsky | Bryan Andrews and Brian Larsen | October 4, 2002 |
While ascending a mountain, Jack encounters a hidden society of Spartans who have fought for five generations against minotaur robots and offers to help them end the war. Together, he and Spartan king Spartok venture into a futuristic fortress to destroy a giant spider robot. Many years later, an elderly Spartok narrates how he correctly believes Jack survived the fortress's destruction.
| 26 | 13 | "Jack's Shoes" | Randy Myers, Robert Alvarez, and Genndy Tartakovsky | Paul Rudish and Charlie Bean | October 11, 2002 |
When robot bikers destroy his sandals, Jack seeks revenge but realizes that he cannot do so without footwear. After unsuccessfully trying out a variety of shoes, he follows a boy with sandals like his to a traditional Japanese family home secluded in a jet engine repair shop, where the boy's father makes him new sandals.

=== Season 3 (2002–2003) ===
| No. overall | No. in season | Title | Directed by | Storyboarded and Written by | Original release date |
|---|---|---|---|---|---|
| 27 | 1 | "Chicken Jack" | Robert Alvarez and Genndy Tartakovsky | Chris Reccardi and Aaron Springer | October 18, 2002 |
Jack is transformed into a chicken after bumping into a cranky wizard. A greedy, hedonistic Italian man named Cacciatore captures him and forces him to be an underground prizefighter. They eventually bump into the wizard again on their way to a prizefighting championship event, and Jack is changed back into a human while Cacciatore is changed into a chicken.
| 28 | 2 | "Jack and the Rave" | Randy Myers and Genndy Tartakovsky | Chris Mitchell and Erik Wiese | November 1, 2002 |
Jack volunteers to rescue Olivia, the daughter of an overly emotional innkeeper, by infiltrating a rave party after witnessing the participants stage a riot. He learns the man behind the rave, DJ Stylbator, is one of Aku's servants, who has been using his music to hypnotize local youths into becoming Aku's slaves. Stylbator combines his sound equipment into a robot exoskeleton, which Jack destroys, freeing the youths.
| 29 | 3 | "Couple on a Train" | Robert Alvarez and Genndy Tartakovsky | Paul Rudish and Charlie Bean | November 8, 2002 |
Jack boards a train to his next destination, only to be pursued by Ezekiel Clench, a bounty hunter armed with multipurpose mechanical hands, and his ex-wife Josephine. They battle on the train until the Clenches capture Jack with chains, but Josephine shoves Ezekiel off to claim Jack's bounty for herself, prompting Jack to use the chains to send her falling off the train, too.: The episode is often misnamed "The Good, the Bad and the Beautiful" in some fan circles.; Quick Draw McGraw and Baba Looey make cameo appearances in this episode.
| 30 | 4 | "Jack and the Zombies" | Genndy Tartakovsky | Bryan Andrews and Brian Larsen | October 25, 2002 |
Aku tricks Jack into entering a cursed graveyard and summons an army of undead warriors. Jack defeats them, but a ghostly witch-hag steals his sword and brings it to Aku, who tries to kill Jack using it. As he is about to stab the samurai, Aku discovers that the sword, which cannot be used for evil, cannot harm Jack, who takes it back and forces him to retreat.
| 31 | 5 | "Jack and the Scarab" | Chris Savino and Genndy Tartakovsky | Bryan Andrews and Brian Larsen | November 22, 2002 |
Aku summons the three immortal servants of Set to destroy Jack while he travels through Egypt. Jack searches for pieces of a golden scarab using clues from a temple he explored in his boyhood. Once completed, the scarab flies away, and the god Horus, Set's main enemy, arrives to destroy Set's minions. Jack asks Horus to help him find a time portal before the god silently departs.
| 32 | 6 | "Jack and the Traveling Creatures" | Randy Myers and Genndy Tartakovsky | Genndy Tartakovsky and Erik Wiese; Jim Smith (additional storyboarder) | April 26, 2003 |
Jack is guided by a variety of creatures to a mysterious time portal, but he learns that only the man who can defeat its guardian in combat can use it. The guardian defeats Jack but spares him, prophesying that Jack is not yet ready as he watches the portal project an image of an older Jack dressed as a king.
| 33 | 7 | "Jack and the Annoying Creature" | Robert Alvarez and Genndy Tartakovsky | Chris Reccardi and Aaron Springer; Bryan Andrews (additional storyboarder) | May 3, 2003 |
Jack encounters an overly friendly creature who accidentally thwarts his every move and eats a jewel that can return him to the past. Although Jack deserts the creature in anger, it returns to help him by shapeshifting into a monstrous being and rescuing him from a gang of greaser robots.
| 34 | 8 | "Jack and the Swamp Wizard" | Randy Myers and Genndy Tartakovsky | Paul Rudish and Charlie Bean | May 10, 2003 |
Jack meets a swamp hermit who guides him to the three gems of Cronus, which can take him home, but the hermit is Aku in disguise, who uses the gems to resurrect Cronus. Jack reveals he knew of Aku's trick, having already snatched a gem, which destroys Cronus. Aku tries to use the gems against Jack, who shatters two and secretly keeps the third.
| 35 | 9 | "Jack and the Haunted House" | Randy Myers and Genndy Tartakovsky | Chris Reccardi and Aaron Springer | May 17, 2003 |
Jack follows a small girl named Kumi into a dilapidated Japanese estate and learns from multiple visions that it is possessed by a demon, who has subsumed her family into its body. The demon captures him and transports his consciousness into an alternate reality, where he wills himself to escape the demon's bonds and destroy it at the core, freeing Kumi's family.
| 36 | 10 | "Jack, the Monks, and the Ancient Master's Son" | Randy Myers and Genndy Tartakovsky | Bryan Andrews and Brian Larsen | May 31, 2003 |
Jack is attacked by two Shaolin monks, whom he realizes are members of the order he once trained with. Their master informs Jack of an ancient temple with a time portal that activates when the sun is at its peak. Unwilling to let the monks die at the hands of the temple's living stone guardians, Jacks gives up a chance to enter the portal to save them.
| 37 | 11 | "The Birth of Evil" | Robert Alvarez and Genndy Tartakovsky | Don Shank | August 16, 2003 |
| 38 | 12 | "The Birth of Evil" | Robert Alvarez and Genndy Tartakovsky | Don Shank and Genndy Tartakovsky; Erik Wiese (additional storyboarder) [I] | August 16, 2003 |
Part I — At the beginning of the universe, the gods Ra, Rama, and Odin destroy a shapeless black mass but miss a piece that eventually crashes down to earth, killing the dinosaurs. It develops into a pit of dark liquid, killing all who come in contact with it from prehistory to the dawn of Japanese civilization. In feudal Japan, the Emperor sets out to destroy the pit, using the arrow with magic poison, but instead he accidentally creates Aku. Part II — Odin's horse Sleipnir frees the Emperor from Aku's captivity and carries him to a mountaintop fortress. While walking inside, he suddenly finds himself in a heavenly realm before the gods, who forge a katana imbued with his righteous spirit. The Emperor then uses this sword to seal Aku below the earth. Upon learning his son, the future Jack, is born, he plans for Aku's return.: This episode, a chronological prequel to the series' pilot, won the Primetime Emmy Award for Outstanding Animated Program.
| 39 | 13 | "Jack and the Labyrinth" | Robert Alvarez and Genndy Tartakovsky | Don Shank | June 7, 2003 |
Jack finds a booby-trapped labyrinth in a pyramid housing a diamond that could send him home. A cunning thief with a multipurpose briefcase also enters the maze, and the two compete to claim the diamond while helping each other escape robot guardians. Outside the pyramid, a jet of flame knocks the diamond from the thief's grasp, and it shatters after its fall.

=== Season 4 (2003–2004) ===
| No. overall | No. in season | Title | Directed by | Storyboarded and Written by | Original release date |
|---|---|---|---|---|---|
| 40 | 1 | "Jack vs. the Ninja" | Robert Alvarez, Randy Myers, and Genndy Tartakovsky | Bryan Andrews and Brian Larsen | June 14, 2003 |
Aku sends a robot shinobi to kill Jack. While Jack is fighting to save a village from giant, robotic lobsters, the shinobi kidnaps a small boy and traps him in an ancient temple. Inside, Jack, understanding that the shinobi hides in shadows, hides in sunlight by fashioning his uniform into a white ninja outfit, then defeats the assassin moments before the sun sets.
| 41 | 2 | "Robo-Samurai vs. Mondo-bot" | Randy Myers and Genndy Tartakovsky | Bryan Andrews, Brian Larsen, Jim Smith, and Erik Wiese | June 21, 2003 |
Jack enters the ruined city of Andromeda and is rescued from the monstrous robot Mondo-bot by friendly robots, who inform him that Andromeda was built atop an ancient, magical city of stone giants. He discovers an enormous stone samurai underwater, which fires an optic beam to merge with him, allowing him to control the stone giant to destroy Mondo-bot.
| 42 | 3 | "Samurai vs. Samurai" | Robert Alvarez and Genndy Tartakovsky | Chris Reccardi and Aaron Springer | June 28, 2003 |
At a bar, Jack is goaded into a duel by "Da' Samurai" (voiced by David Alan Grier), an arrogant bully who portrays himself as a samurai. Judging him to be unworthy of an actual swordfight, Jack duels Da' Samurai with bamboo sticks and exposes him as physically weak, then saves him from Aku's robot assassins. Da' Samurai risks his own life to save Jack when the assassins form a giant robot. As Jack leaves, Da' Samurai, realizing the error of his ways, runs after him to seek more knowledge.
| 43 | 4 | "The Aku Infection" | Randy Myers and Genndy Tartakovsky | Paul Rudish and Charlie Bean | November 5, 2003 |
When Aku catches a cold and spreads it to Jack, Jack is accidentally infected with his evil and seeks a cure before this essence can transform him into a clone of Aku. With help from lizard monks, he enters a deep meditative state and remembers everyone he has saved and befriended in the past and future, giving him the strength to overcome the infection.
| 44 | 5 | "The Princess and the Bounty Hunters" | Robert Alvarez and Genndy Tartakovsky | Bryan Andrews and Brian Larsen | November 12, 2003 |
Five world-renowned bounty hunters gather to compete to kill Jack. Princess Mira, a sixth hunter from a kingdom enslaved by Aku, persuades the group to work together after pointing out the flaws in their plans. Jack nevertheless repels the hunters' combined attacks back on them, defeating all except Mira, who drops her dagger in surrender.
| 45 | 6 | "The Scotsman Saves Jack" | Randy Myers and Genndy Tartakovsky | Bryan Andrews and Brian Larsen | August 23, 2003 |
| 46 | 7 | "The Scotsman Saves Jack" | Genndy Tartakovsky | Bryan Andrews and Brian Larsen | August 23, 2003 |
Part I – The Scotsman discovers Jack aboard a ship with his memory and sword lost, believing he is a waiter named "Brent Worthington". He seeks the cause of the samurai's amnesia and staves off bounty hunters after a now defenseless Jack, then hires a group of pirates to sail them to "The Great Unknown". Part II – The Scotsman learns Jack's amnesia was caused by three sirens, whose hypnotic song the Scotsman can resist due to his loyalty to his wife. He drowns out their song with his bagpipes, allowing Jack to recover his uniform and sword and slay the sirens when they form a monster. After being abandoned by the sirens' freed slaves, Jack and the Scotsman compete to see who will row them back to the mainland, and Jack wins each challenge.
| 47 | 8 | "Jack and the Flying Prince and Princess" | Chris Savino and Genndy Tartakovsky | Paul Rudish | November 19, 2003 |
Aku imprisons Astor and Verbina, the prince and princess of the moth-like Lebidopterin aliens, when they escape their war-torn homeworld and seek his aide. Jack rescues the siblings and defends them from beetle drones while they use their spaceship's artificial gravity to help him. To thank Jack, the Lebidopterins build a statue of him on their homeworld.: The episode's plot is an homage to the Star Wars film series.
| 48 | 9 | "Jack vs. Aku" | Robert Alvarez and Genndy Tartakovsky | Chris Reccardi and Aaron Springer | November 24, 2003 |
Seeking to end their struggle, Aku proposes a duel between him and Jack, with neither Jack using his sword nor Aku using his magical abilities. Jack correctly suspects Aku will try to cheat and hides fake swords all over the battleground. As Aku, who also suspected Jack would cheat, realizes this, Jack uses his true sword to force him to flee once again.: This is the last episode to feature Mako as Aku.
| 49 | 10 | "The Four Seasons of Death" | Randy Myers and Genndy Tartakovsky | Bryan Andrews and Mark Andrews | September 25, 2004 |
Four short stories are presented in the following order: Summer: Jack encounters apparitions in a desert but cannot attack them. Realizing they are illusions when one passes through him, he continues unafraid and finds an oasis, thinking it is another illusion until he falls into it, much to his delight. Fall: An excitable evil scientist concocts a potion and pours it into a well, hoping to trick passersby into drinking it. Jack hears the scientist's sweat drop on a leaf and feigns dying of the poisoned water, then spits the water stored in his mouth into the scientist's mouth, reducing him to autumn leaves, before destroying the well. Winter: In the depths of a snowy mountain, a yeti-like tribe forges a powerful elemental sword for which warriors compete in a gladiator-style battle. The winner claims the sword and sets out to fight Jack, who easily cuts the blade in half. Spring: Jack enters a forest of thorny vines that magically turns into a springtime wonderland, where a spirit woman encourages him to stay and rest. Haunted by visions of Aku, Jack tries to leave but realizes the spirit intends to keep him permanently, so he dispels the spring illusion as he fights against her vine attacks.
| 50 | 11 | "Tale of X-49" | Genndy Tartakovsky | Bryan Andrews and Genndy Tartakovsky | September 25, 2004 |
X-49 (voiced by Daran Norris), a retired robot hitman, narrates his origins as the only member of one of Aku's defunct robot forces with emotions and how Aku kidnapped his pet dog Lulu to blackmail him into pursuing Jack. He hunts Jack in a deserted robot factory but falls for a decoy, and the samurai fatally attacks him. Before shutting down, he tells Jack to take care of Lulu.
| 51 | 12 | "Young Jack in Africa" | Robert Alvarez and Genndy Tartakovsky | Jim Smith, Erik Wiese, and Genndy Tartakovsky | September 25, 2004 |
In a flashback to his childhood training, Jack arrives in Africa and learns to fight with pole weapons from a tribal chief while also befriending the chief's son. When a rival tribe serving Aku takes the friendly tribe hostage in search of the future samurai, Jack learns to fight using the enemies' spinning weapons to rescue his allies.
| 52 | 13 | "Jack and the Baby" | Robert Alvarez and Genndy Tartakovsky | Paul Rudish and Genndy Tartakovsky | September 25, 2004 |
Jack rescues a baby from robotic ogres but has troubles taking care of her in searching for her mother. Along the way, he tells the baby the story of Momotarō. After destroying the ogres, he returns the baby to her mother, who learns her child has a stern facial expression from witnessing combat, having achieved "sakai, the spirit of a samurai".

=== Season 5 (2017) ===
| No. overall | No. in season | Title | Directed by | Storyboarded and Written by | Story by | Original release date | US viewers (millions) |
|---|---|---|---|---|---|---|---|
| 53 | 1 | "XCII" | Genndy Tartakovsky | Bryan Andrews and Genndy Tartakovsky | Darrick Bachman, Bryan Andrews, and Genndy Tartakovsky | March 11, 2017 | 1.55 |
| 54 | 2 | "XCIII" | Genndy Tartakovsky | Bryan Andrews and Genndy Tartakovsky | Darrick Bachman, Bryan Andrews, and Genndy Tartakovsky | March 18, 2017 | 1.30 |
| 55 | 3 | "XCIV" | Genndy Tartakovsky | David Krentz and Genndy Tartakovsky | Darrick Bachman, Bryan Andrews, and Genndy Tartakovsky | March 25, 2017 | 1.35 |
| 56 | 4 | "XCV" | Genndy Tartakovsky | Genndy Tartakovsky | Darrick Bachman, Bryan Andrews, and Genndy Tartakovsky | April 8, 2017 | 1.33 |
| 57 | 5 | "XCVI" | Genndy Tartakovsky | Bryan Andrews and Genndy Tartakovsky | Darrick Bachman, Bryan Andrews, and Genndy Tartakovsky | April 15, 2017 | 1.29 |
| 58 | 6 | "XCVII" | Genndy Tartakovsky | Genndy Tartakovsky | Darrick Bachman, Bryan Andrews, and Genndy Tartakovsky | April 22, 2017 | 1.33 |
| 59 | 7 | "XCVIII" | Genndy Tartakovsky | Bryan Andrews and Genndy Tartakovsky | Darrick Bachman, Bryan Andrews, and Genndy Tartakovsky | April 29, 2017 | 1.30 |
| 60 | 8 | "XCIX" | Genndy Tartakovsky | Genndy Tartakovsky | Darrick Bachman, Bryan Andrews, and Genndy Tartakovsky | May 6, 2017 | 1.36 |
| 61 | 9 | "C" | Genndy Tartakovsky | Bryan Andrews and Genndy Tartakovsky | Darrick Bachman, Bryan Andrews, and Genndy Tartakovsky | May 13, 2017 | 1.33 |
| 62 | 10 | "CI" | Genndy Tartakovsky | Bryan Andrews and Genndy Tartakovsky | Darrick Bachman, Bryan Andrews, and Genndy Tartakovsky | May 20, 2017 | 1.46 |
