= Angelica Jade Bastién =

American essayist and critic

- Education: Columbia College Chicago
- Occupations: Critic; essayist
- Writing career
- Years active: 2013–present
- Subjects: Madness; horror; women; feminism; culture
- Website: https://angelicabastien.com/

Angelica Jade Bastién is an American essayist and critic. She is a staff writer for Vulture, where she has reviewed film and written television recaps since 2015. Bastién also frequently discusses horror and depictions of women and madness. She has published writing in The New York Times, The Village Voice, Harper's Bazaar, Criterion, and others.

== Career ==
Bastién is a staff writer for Vulture, where she reviews film and television. She has contributed writing to The Atlantic, The New York Times, The Village Voice, The New Republic, and other outlets. Frequent topics of her analysis include feminism and representations of Black people in film and television. She has a strong personal interest in the horror genre and the work of Keanu Reeves. Bastién has cited Angela Carter, Toni Morrison, and James Baldwin as the greatest influences on her work.

Bastién's writing also explores depictions of women, mental health, and madness. She has connected her personal experiences with mental illness to her criticism. Bastién has named Now, Voyager as a movie that has great personal significance to her. She appeared on a 2018 episode of the podcast This Movie Changed Me, produced by On Being Studios, to discuss the film. The episode was named a 2019 Webby Award honoree.

== Personal life ==
Bastién was raised in Miami and her family is from Louisiana. She is Afro-Latina. She resides in Chicago, where she received her bachelor's degree from Columbia College Chicago.

== Awards and nominations ==
Year	Organization	Category	Work	Result	Ref.
2022	National Magazine Awards	Essays and Criticism	Selected New York Contributions: "Them is Pure Degradation Porn"; "The Underground Railroad is the Cinematic Event of the Year"; "Cruella is the Girl-Bossification of the Madwoman"	Nominated	
