= Jeff Bennett =

American voice actor (born 1962)

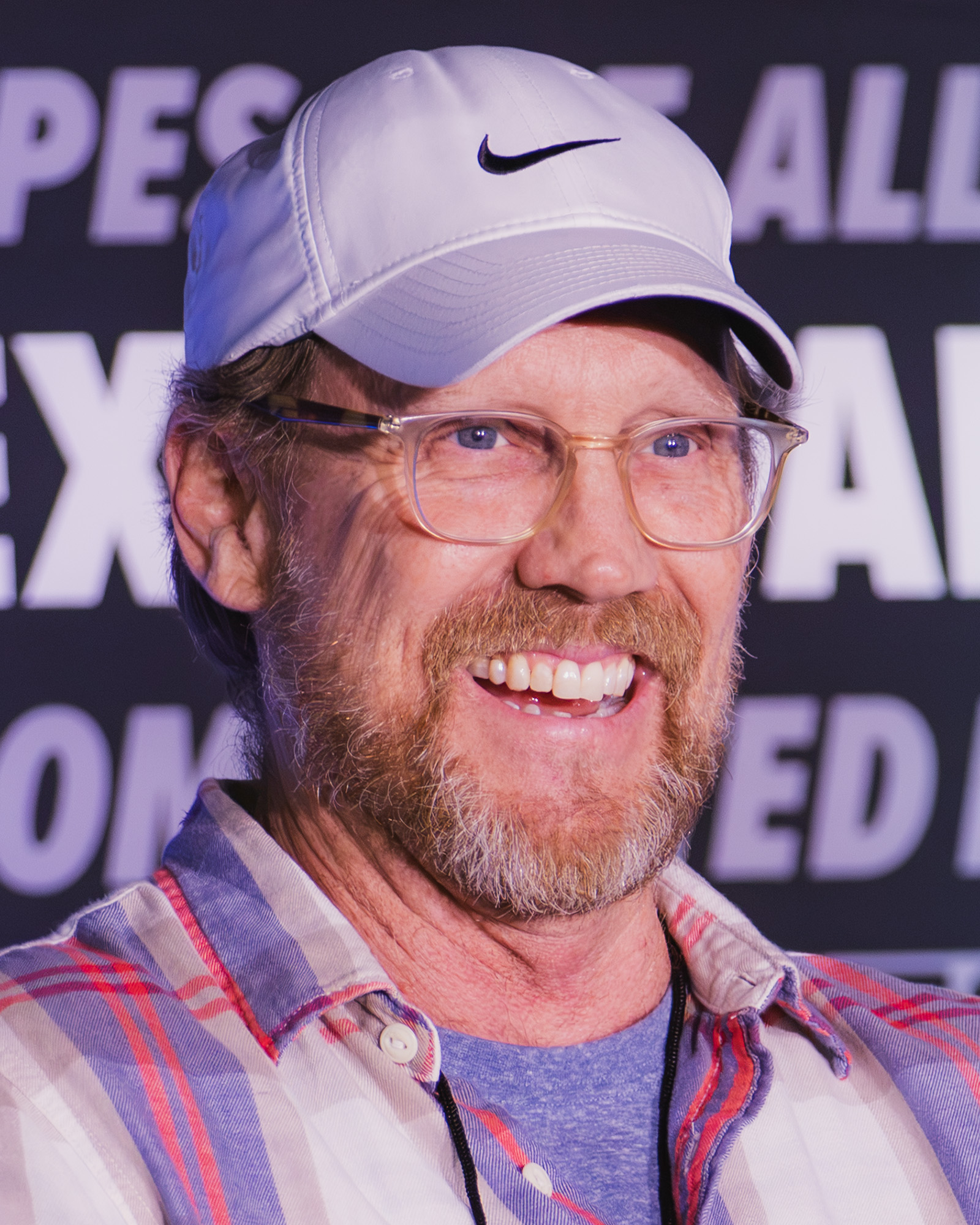
- Bennett in 2026
- Born: October 2, 1962 (age 64); Houston, Texas, U.S.
- Occupation: Voice actor
- Years active: 1985–present
- Spouse: Susan E. Welby (m. 1988)
- Children: 1
- Relatives: Collette Sunderman (sister)

Jeff Glen Bennett (born October 2, 1962) is an American voice actor. He voiced the titular character of Johnny Bravo, Dexter and Dee Dee's Dad in Dexter's Laboratory, Ace, Grubber, and Big Billy in The Powerpuff Girls, Peter Puppy in Earthworm Jim, Brooklyn in Gargoyles, Hämsterviel in the Lilo & Stitch franchise, Clay Bailey in Xiaolin Showdown, Petrie in The Land Before Time franchise, The Man with the Yellow Hat in Curious George, Clank in Tinker Bell and Kowalski in the Penguins of Madagascar series (replacing Chris Miller). In 2012, Bennett was awarded an Annie Award for his role in The Penguins of Madagascar and in 2016, he was awarded an Emmy Award for his role in Transformers: Rescue Bots. He has been listed among the top names in the voice-over field.

== Early life ==
Bennett was born on October 2, 1962, in Houston, Texas. He got his acting training on the stage at the Alley Theatre in Houston, before moving to California with his family in 1990.

== Career ==
Bennett's first role in the voice-over industry was Horace "I.Q." Boothroyd the Third in James Bond Jr..

Afterwards, more roles came which included Brooklyn in Gargoyles, Petrie in The Land Before Time series from the second film onward (replacing the late Will Ryan), Jitters A. Dog in Bonkers, Lord Camembert in Biker Mice from Mars, Roger Dearly, Lieutenant Pug and several others on 101 Dalmatians: The Series, and Dexter's Dad in Dexter's Laboratory.

In early 1995, he played what would be his best-known role, the title character in Johnny Bravo and Johnny Bravo and the Amazon Women in What a Cartoon!. For the character, Bennett used an Elvis Presley impersonation, which was somewhere between the young and the older Presley. In 1997, Johnny Bravo was made into a television series. A cult hit show, it continued from 1997 to 2004, receiving praise and multiple Annie Award nominations, including one for Bennett.

He has also provided various voices in the animated series Freakazoid!, voicing characters such as The Huntsman, Cave Guy, Candle Jack, Lord Bravery, and many others.

In 1997, Bennett would be one of six main cast members of the series Pepper Ann, being the only one to exclusively play recurring characters, including Craig Bean, Dieter Liederhosen, Ned Diggity, and several gag characters.

Bennett voiced Drixenol "Drix" Koldriliff in Ozzy & Drix (replacing David Hyde Pierce), Clay Bailey on Xiaolin Showdown, Mr. Boss and Mr. Fizz in Codename: Kids Next Door, Raj and Samson on Camp Lazlo, Principal Luna and Jan Rongetes (janitor and Swedish air guitarist) on Class of 3000, Azmuth in Ben 10: Alien Force and Ben 10: Ultimate Alien, Clank in Tinker Bell, Mr. Smee and Bones on Jake and the Never Land Pirates.

From 2006 to 2022, Bennett voiced the role of the Man with the Yellow Hat and neighborhood farmer Mr. Renkins in the PBS Kids TV series Curious George. The series was awarded Daytime Emmys for Outstanding Children's Animated Program in 2008, 2010, and 2012. From 2008 to 2010, he voiced the role of Peppermint Larry in the television show The Marvelous Misadventures of Flapjack.

Bennett has also done the voices of the Joker and other characters on Batman: The Brave and the Bold, Dorkus in Planet Sheen, several characters (Keswick, Larry, and Ollie) on T.U.F.F. Puppy, Red Tornado in Young Justice, and Kowalski in The Penguins of Madagascar.

In 2012, Bennett was awarded the Annie Award for Outstanding Individual Achievement for Voice Acting in a Television Production for his role as Kowalski. He was also nominated for a Daytime Emmy Award for Outstanding Performer in an Animated Program, but lost to June Foray.

In 2016, Bennett won the Daytime Emmy Award for Outstanding Performer in an Animated Program for his performance as Mayor Lusky on Transformers: Rescue Bots.

== Personal life ==
Bennett has been married to Susan E. Welby since 1988 and has one daughter (born 1998).

== Filmography ==
=== Film ===
List of voice performances in feature and direct-to-video films
Year	Title	Role	Note(s)
1993	Batman: Mask of the Phantasm	Additional voices	
1994	A Hollywood Hounds Christmas	Dude, Additional voices	
1994	The Return of Jafar	Thief	Direct-to-video
1994	The Lion King	Zazu (singing voice)	2003 Platinum Edition
1994	The Land Before Time II: The Great Valley Adventure	Petrie, Ozzy	Direct-to-video
1995	Gargoyles the Movie: The Heroes Awaken	Brooklyn, Magus, Owen	
1995	Mortal Kombat: The Journey Begins	Johnny Cage, Scorpion	Direct-to-video
1995	The New Adventures of Peter Rabbit	Benjamin Bunny, Mr. McGregor, Trevor T. Tittlemouse, Squirrel, Chipmunk, Mr. Tod	Direct-to-video
1995	The Land Before Time III: The Time of the Great Giving	Petrie, Mutt, Iguanodon	Direct-to-video
1996	Siegfried & Roy: Masters of the Impossible		
1996	James and the Giant Peach	Centipede (singing voice)	
1996	The Hunchback of Notre Dame	Frollo's Soldiers	
1996	Aladdin and the King of Thieves	Nahbi, Additional voices	Direct-to-video
1996	The Land Before Time IV: Journey Through the Mists	Petrie, Ichy	Direct-to-video
1996	Dot and Spot's Magical Christmas	Steve	
1997	Mighty Ducks the Movie: The First Face-Off	Duke L'Orange	
1997	Beauty and the Beast: The Enchanted Christmas	Axe, Poke	Direct-to-video
1997	The Land Before Time V: The Mysterious Island	Petrie, Mr. Clubtail	Direct-to-video
1998	Beauty and the Beast: Belle's Magical World	Crane	Direct-to-video
1998	Pocahontas II: Journey to a New World	Additional voices	Direct-to-video
1998	The Land Before Time VI: The Secret of Saurus Rock	Petrie, Spike	Direct-to-video
1999	Wakko's Wish	Captain of the Guard	Direct-to-video
1999	The Nuttiest Nutcracker	The Colonel, Mouse Doctor, Mouse Soldier	Direct-to-video
1999	Mickey's Once Upon a Christmas	Mortimer Mouse, Firefighter #2, Store Announcer	Direct-to-video
1999	An American Tail: The Mystery of the Night Monster	Slug	Direct-to-video
1999	Dexter's Laboratory: Ego Trip	Mandark Robot, Dad, Robot #1, Officer 9412, Action Dexter	
2000	An Extremely Goofy Movie	Bradley Uppercrust III, Unemployment Lady, Chuck the Sportscaster	Direct-to-video
2000	Scooby-Doo and the Alien Invaders	Lester	Direct-to-video
2000	Tweety's High-Flying Adventure	Foghorn Leghorn, Casino Cat #1, additional voices	
2000	Joseph: King of Dreams	Levi	Direct-to-video
2000	The Land Before Time VII: The Stone of Cold Fire	Petrie, Spokes Dinosaur	Direct-to-video
2000	Alvin and the Chipmunks Meet the Wolfman	Additional voices (uncredited)	Direct-to-video
2001	Lady and the Tramp II: Scamp's Adventure	Tramp, Jock, Trusty, Dogcatcher	Direct-to-video
2001	The Flintstones: On the Rocks	Xavier the Villain, Club Announcer, Pool Waiter	Direct-to-video
2001	Mickey's Magical Christmas: Snowed in at the House of Mouse	Mr. Jollyland, additional voices	Direct-to-video
2001	The Land Before Time VIII: The Big Freeze	Petrie, Corythosaurus	Direct-to-video
2002	Return to Never Land	Mr. Smee, Pirate Crew	
2002	Balto II: Wolf Quest	Yak	Direct-to-video
2002	Cinderella II: Dreams Come True	Additional voices	Direct-to-video
2002	Tom and Jerry: The Magic Ring	Tom, Droopy, Joey	Direct-to-video
2002	The Powerpuff Girls Movie	Ace, Big Billy, Grubber	
2002	Tarzan & Jane	Professor Archimedes Q. Porter, Robert "Bobby" Canler	Direct-to-video
2002	Mickey's House of Villains	Salesman	Direct-to-video
2002	Winnie the Pooh: A Very Merry Pooh Year	Christopher Robin (singing voice)	Direct-to-video
2002	The Land Before Time IX: Journey to Big Water	Petrie	Direct-to-video
2003	101 Dalmatians II: Patch's London Adventure	Jasper	Direct-to-video
2003	The Jungle Book 2	Buzzie	
2003	Inspector Gadget 2	Brain	
2003	Scooby-Doo! and the Legend of the Vampire	Jasper Ridgeway, Jack, Lifeguard #1	
2003	Atlantis: Milo's Return	Sam McKeane	Direct-to-video
2003	Stitch! The Movie	Dr. Jacques von Hämsterviel	Direct-to-video
2003	Looney Tunes: Back in Action	Yosemite Sam, Foghorn Leghorn, Nasty Canasta	
2003	The Land Before Time X: The Great Longneck Migration	Petrie	Direct-to-video
2003	The Powerpuff Girls: 'Twas the Fight Before Christmas	Driver, Servant, Elf #2	Direct-to-video
2004	The Lion King 1½	Bashful, Additional voices	Direct-to-video
2004	Winnie the Pooh: Springtime with Roo	Piglet (singing voice)	Direct-to-video
2004	The Jimmy Timmy Power Hour	Fairy Agent #2	
2004	Scooby-Doo! and the Loch Ness Monster	Del Chillman, Sir Ian Locksley, Harpoon Gunner	Direct-to-video
2004	Jimmy Neutron: Win, Lose and Kaboom	Gorlock #2, Brain #1	Direct-to-video
2004	Mickey, Donald, Goofy: The Three Musketeers	Beagle Boys, Additional voices	Direct-to-video
2004	Kangaroo Jack: G'Day U.S.A.!	Kangaroo "Jackie Legs" Jack, Lounge Singer	
2004	Mickey's Twice Upon a Christmas	Donner, Additional voices	Direct-to-video
2005	Tom and Jerry: Blast Off to Mars	Dr. Gluckman, Martian Guard #1, President	Direct-to-video
2005	Mulan II	Additional voices	Direct-to-video
2005	The Land Before Time XI: Invasion of the Tinysauruses	Petrie	Direct-to-video
2005	Tom and Jerry: The Fast and the Furry	Steed, TV Announcer	Direct-to-video
2005	The Batman vs. Dracula	Arkham Asylum Inmate, Additional voices	Direct-to-video
2005	Kronk's New Groove	Skinny Old Man, Stout Old Man, Gollum-Rudy, Additional voices	Direct-to-video
2006	The Jimmy Timmy Power Hour 2: When Nerds Collide	Dr. Moist	Direct-to-video
2006	Curious George	Salesman	
2006	Asterix and the Vikings	Getafix, Narrator	
2006	Queer Duck: The Movie	Rev. Vandergelding, Additional voices	
2006	Leroy & Stitch	Dr. Jacques von Hämsterviel	Direct-to-video
2006	Codename: Kids Next Door: Operation Z.E.R.O.	Mr. Boss, Mr. Fizz, Benedict Wigglestein	
2006	Brother Bear 2	Atka	Direct-to-video
2006	The Land Before Time XII: The Great Day of the Flyers	Petrie, Petrie's Sibling #2	Direct-to-video
2006	The Fox and the Hound 2	Amos Slade	Direct-to-video
2006	Bratz Genie Magic	Kon	Direct-to-video
2006	Bratz: Passion 4 Fashion - Diamondz	Mr. Jones	Direct-to-video
2007	Cinderella III: A Twist in Time	Additional voices	Direct-to-video
2007	Camp Lazlo: Where's Lazlo?	Raj, Samson, Hoo Ha, Harold	Direct-to-video
2007	TMNT	Additional voices	
2007	Disney Princess Enchanted Tales: Follow Your Dreams	Lord Duke, The Painter, The Sultan, King Hubert, Farmer, Arguing Neighbor #1	Direct-to-video
2007	Chill Out, Scooby-Doo!	Dell Chillman, Pilot	Direct-to-video
2007	Enchanted	Pip in Andalasia	
2007	The Land Before Time XIII: The Wisdom of Friends	Petrie	Direct-to-video
2008	Justice League: The New Frontier	Sportscaster	Direct-to-video
2008	The Little Mermaid: Ariel's Beginning	Benjamin	Direct-to-video
2008	Tinker Bell	Clank	Direct-to-video
2008	Dead Space: Downfall	Leggio, Dobbs, Jackson	
2008	Bolt	Lloyd	
2008	The Powerpuff Girls Rule!	Ace, Prisoner, Concerned Citizen	
2008	Cranberry Christmas	Cyrus Grape	
2009	Open Season 2	Additional voices	Direct-to-video
2009	Dr. Dolittle Million Dollar Mutts	Princess, Rocco, Frog, Horse	
2009	Curious George 2: Follow That Monkey!	Ted	Direct-to-video
2009	Curious George: A Very Monkey Christmas	Ted, Stew	Direct-to-video
2009	Bionicle: The Legend Reborn	Strakk, Tarix	Direct-to-video
2009	The Haunted World of El Superbeasto	Nerdy Patron	Direct-to-video
2009	Tinker Bell and the Lost Treasure	Clank, Leech, Fairy Gary	
2010
2010	Lego Atlantis: The Movie	Dr. Jeff "Fish" Fisher	
2010	Gaturro	Federico Michou	
2010	Lego: The Adventures of Clutch Powers	Bernie von Beam, Artie Fol	Direct-to-video
2010	Cats & Dogs: The Revenge of Kitty Galore	Duncan MacDougall	
2010	Tinker Bell and the Great Fairy Rescue	Clank, Driver	Direct-to-video
2010	Kung Fu Magoo	Sid, Evil Moustache Cabal, Guard	
2010	DC Showcase: The Spectre	Foster Brenner, Flemming, Peter McCoy	
2011	Open Season 3	Earl	Direct-to-video
2011	The Little Engine That Could	Hudson, Engine 35	Direct-to-video
2011	Phineas and Ferb the Movie: Across the 2nd Dimension	Additional voices	
2011	Pixie Hollow Games	Clank, Fairy Gary	
2011	Batman: Year One	Alfred Pennyworth	Direct-to-video
2012	Secret of the Wings	Clank, Dewey	
2012	Foodfight!	Lieutenant X	
2012	Scooby-Doo! Music of the Vampire	Lord Valdronya, Vincent Van Helsing	Direct-to-video
2013	Scooby-Doo! Mask of the Blue Falcon	Owen Garrison/Blue Falcon	Direct-to-video
2013	Khumba	Riverine Rabbit, Elder # 3, The Zebra	
2013	Turbo	The Crows #2	
2013	Scooby-Doo! Stage Fright	Mike Gale, Mel Richmond	Direct-to-video
2013	Planes	Additional voices	
2013	Scooby-Doo! Adventures: The Mystery Map	Lighthouse Lou, Hot Dog Vendor	Direct-to-video
2013	Curious George: Swings Into Spring	Ted, Stew, Mr. Renkins, Wint Quint, Mr. Auger	Direct-to-video
2013	Curious George: A Halloween Boo Fest	Ted, Mr. Renkins	Direct-to-video
2014	Khumba	Rabbit, Elder #3	
2014	The Pirate Fairy	Clank, Fairy Gary, Smee	Direct-to-video
2014	Scooby-Doo! Frankencreepy	Iago, Schmidlap	Direct-to-video
2014	The Snow Queen 2: The Snow King	Troll King	
2015	Scooby-Doo! Moon Monster Madness	Colt Steelcase	Direct-to-video
2015	Curious George 3: Back to the Jungle	Ted	Direct-to-video
2016	The Land Before Time XIV: Journey of the Brave	Petrie, Diggers	Direct-to-video
2017	Lego Scooby-Doo! Blowout Beach Bash	Deputy, Museum Guide	Direct-to-video
2018	Scooby-Doo! & Batman: The Brave and the Bold	Joker	Direct-to-video
2019	Curious George: Royal Monkey	Ted, Butler, Announcer	Direct-to-video
2020	Curious George: Go West, Go Wild!	Ted, Conductor	Direct-to-video
2021	Straight Outta Nowhere: Scooby-Doo! Meets Courage the Cowardly Dog	General, Self Help Book	Direct-to-video
2021	DC Showcase: Blue Beetle	Captain Atom	Direct-to-video
2021	Curious George: Cape Ahoy	Ted	
2022	Chip 'n Dale: Rescue Rangers	Lumière	
2022	Trick or Treat Scooby-Doo!	Charlie Hundrum, Hank, Shady Guy	
2023	Lego Disney Princess: The Castle Quest	Mr. Smee	
2026	Batman: Knightfall	The Ventriloquist, Vincent	Direct-to-video

=== Animation ===
List of voice performances in television shows
Year	Title	Role	Notes
1991	Where's Waldo?	Additional voices	
1991–1992	James Bond Jr.	Horace "I.Q." Boothroyd the Third, Nick Nack, Oddjob, Pump, Scumlord	
1991–1993	The Legend of Prince Valiant	Lord Maldon	
1992	Raw Toonage	Jitters A. Dog	
1992	The Little Mermaid	Prince Eric	Episode: "Scuttle"
1992	Tiny Toon Adventures	Additional voices	
1992	The Plucky Duck Show	Kevin Costner	
1992–1993	Batman: The Animated Series	H.A.R.D.A.C., Additional voices	
1992–1993	Wild West C.O.W.-Boys of Moo Mesa	The Cowlorado Kid	
1993	Shelley Duvall's Bedtime Stories	Ticker the Clock	Episode: "Bootsie Barker Bites/Ruby the Copycat"
1993	2 Stupid Dogs	Hot Rodney	
1993	Marsupilami	Additional voices	
1993–1994	Bonkers	Jitters A. Dog, Roderick Lizzard, Mr. Doodles	
1993–1996	Biker Mice from Mars	Lord Camembert, Number One, Provolone, Mace	
1993–1998	Animaniacs	Baloney, Captain Mel, Mr. Flaxseed, Sherlock Holmes, Ernest Hemingway, Arnold Schwarzenegger, Tom Hanks, Christopher Walken, additional voices	
1993–1999	Rugrats	Ben, the Brother-in-Law, Best Man, Hip Guy	
1994	A Hollywood Hounds Christmas	Dude, additional voices	Television film
1994–1995	Aladdin	Amin Damoola, Mozenrath	3 episodes
1994–1996	Phantom 2040	Maxwell Maddision Jr.	
1994–1996	Gargoyles	Brooklyn, Owen Burnett, Additional voices	
1995	Skeleton Warriors	Justin Steele, Lightstar	
1995	The Shnookums & Meat Funny Cartoon Show	Pith Possum/Peter Possum, Tex Tinstar	
1995	The Tick	Thomas Edison	Episode: "Leonardo da Vinci and His Fightin' Genius Time Commandos!"
1995	Bump in the Night	Gloog	Episode: "Love Stinks/Love's Labor Bumped"
1995	The Ren & Stimpy Show	People Screaming	Episode: "Stimpy's Pet/Ren's Brain"
1995–1996	Earthworm Jim	Peter Puppy, Narrator, Additional Voices	
1995–1996	What-a-Mess	Additional Voices	
1995–1996	The Savage Dragon	Barbaric, Howard Niseman, Mako the Shark	
1995–1996	Timon & Pumbaa	Natives, Toucan Dan, El Toro, Angel, Castaway, Vampire Bat, Duke Meerkat, Foxhound, Beast	
1995–1997	Freakazoid!	Cave Guy, Candle Jack, Lord Bravery, Waylon Jeepers, Mike, The Huntsman, Medulla, Al, Keir Dullea, Manager, Gasigo Attendants, Bearded Archeologist	
1995–1997	The Twisted Tales of Felix the Cat	Additional voices	
1995–1997	The Mask: Animated Series	Eddie, Fish Guy, additional voices	
1995–1998	Pinky and the Brain	Baloney, Arnold Schwarzenegger, Jerry Seinfeld, Leonard Shelton, various	
1995–2000	The Sylvester & Tweety Mysteries	Bertie, Dawes the Butler, Shecky White, Nohans, Pitu Le Pew, Mole, Fred Daily, Angua, Fog Dog, Wayne Figg	
1996	Adventures from the Book of Virtues	Frog Prince, Samuel Washington	Episode: "Honesty"
1996	Wing Commander Academy	Additional voices	
1996	The Real Adventures of Jonny Quest	Additional voices	
1996	Bruno the Kid	Additional voices	
1996	Jungle Cubs	McCoy	Episode: "Hulla Baloo/Shere Bliss"
1996	Quack Pack	The Great Dr. Horton Letrek	
1996	Superman: The Animated Series	Doctor	Episode: "The Way of All Flesh"
1996	Waynehead	Francis	Episode: "Brothers and Bros."
1996–1997	Captain Simian and the Space Monkeys	Orbitron, Aronus	
1996–1997	Mighty Ducks	Duke L'Orange	
1996–1997	Road Rovers	Blitz	
1996–2003	Dexter's Laboratory	Dexter's Dad, additional voices	
1997–2004	Johnny Bravo	Johnny Bravo, additional voices	
1997	Nightmare Ned	Conrad	
1997–1998	101 Dalmatians: The Series	Roger Dearly, Lt. Pug, Sgt. Tibbs, additional voices	
1997–1998	Space Goofs	Bud Budiovitch, Stereo Monovici, Additional voices	
1997, 1999	The New Batman Adventures	Jack Ryder / Creeper, Dad	2 episodes
1997–2001	Pepper Ann	Craig Bean, Dieter Liederhosen, Ned Diggity, Pink-Eye Pete, Shelf McClain, Grandpa Leo, Additional voices	64 episodes (93 segments) (Note: Main Cast, erroneously uncredited in Season 1, Episode 8A: "In Support of" & Season 2, Episode 8A: "Presenting Stuart Walldinger".)
1998	Cow and Chicken	Announcer	Episode: "Goin' My Way?"
1998	I Am Weasel	Dog Catcher	Episode: "I Are Good Dog!"
1998	Oh Yeah! Cartoons	Juanito, various	
1998	The Wild Thornberrys	Officer	Episode: "Vacant Lot"
1998–1999	Pinky, Elmyra & the Brain	Wally Faust, Baloney, additional voices	
1998–2000	Histeria!	Napoleon Bonaparte, Lucky Bob, Alexander the Great, Jefferson Davis, David Labrador, Nikola Tesla, Job Counselor, additional voices	
1998–2005	The Powerpuff Girls	Ace, Big Billy, Grubber, Major Man, Big Ben, Down Under Mate, Professor Dick Hardly, additional voices	
1999	The New Woody Woodpecker Show	Pigeon Boss	Episode: "Downsized Woody"
1999	The Secret Files of the Spy Dogs	Additional voices	
1999	Batman Beyond	Stewart Lowe / 2-D Man, Cop	2 episodes
1999	Detention	Buzzsaw	Episode: "Capitol Punishment"
1999–2000	Mickey Mouse Works	Mr. Jollyland, Salesman, Baby Shelby, Magical Mouse	
2000	Poochini's Yard	Additional voices	
2000	Cartoon Cartoon Fridays	Johnny Bravo	
2000	Buzz Lightyear of Star Command	Brain Pods, Dreadnaught Computer, Binipardians	
2000	Static Shock	Anchor	Episode: "Aftershock"
2000–2002	Clerks: The Animated Series	Additional voices	
2000–2003	Scruff	Narrator	
2000–2004	The Weekenders	Tish's Dad, additional voices	
2001	The Zeta Project	Cody Koala	Episode: "Taffy Time"
2001–2003	House of Mouse	Reluctant Dragon, Shelby, Mr. Toad, Policeman and Dennis the Duck	
2001–2003	The Book of Pooh	Piglet (singing voice)	
2001–2003	The Legend of Tarzan	Prof. Archimedes Q. Porter, Robert Canler	
2001–2004	Samurai Jack	Additional voices	
2001–2005	The Proud Family	Additional voices	
2002	Totally Spies!	Great Kandinsky, Auctioneer, Edison	
2002	The Groovenians	Suavo	Television pilot
2002–2003	Whatever Happened to... Robot Jones?	Principal Madman, additional voices	
2002–2004	Fillmore!	Mason, Plant Manager, Cowboy, Man #1	
2002–2004	Ozzy & Drix	Drix, PB, Bubba	
2002–2004	Teamo Supremo	Additional voices	
2002–2005	Kim Possible	Adrena Lynn's Cameraman, Jerry, Desk Clerk, Emergency Pet Groomer, additional voices	
2002–2006	The Adventures of Jimmy Neutron: Boy Genius	Additional voices	
2002–2006	What's New, Scooby-Doo?	Charles "Crunchy" Granville, Fritz, Mr. Keenan, Roderick Kingston, Writer, Mister B, Scar, Guard, Earnest Bailey, Sam, General Nessmeyer	
2002–2008	Codename: Kids Next Door	Numbuh 4's Dad, Mr. Boss, Mr. Fizz, Destructo Dad, Principal Sauerbraten, Daddy, Dr. Sigmund Teeth	
2003	Stuart Little	The Crows	Episode: "A Little Bit Country"
2003	The Mummy	Fadil	
2003	Time Squad	Johannes Gutenberg	Episode: "Ex Marks the Spot"
2003–2005	ChalkZone	Bruno Bullnerd	
2003–2005	Duck Dodgers	Count Muerte, Victor Von Boogieman, additional voices	
2003–2006	Lilo & Stitch: The Series	Dr. Jacques von Hämsterviel	
2003–2006	Xiaolin Showdown	Clay Bailey, Master Monk Guan, Mala Mala Jong, various voices	
2003–2008	The Grim Adventures of Billy & Mandy	Additional voices	
2004	Museum Scream	Sylvester	
2004	Hare and Loathing in Las Vegas	Yosemite Sam	
2004	Duck Dodgers in Attack of the Drones	Daffy Duck	
2004	Cock-a-Doodle-Duel	Foghorn Leghorn	
2004	Super Robot Monkey Team Hyperforce Go!	Lord Scrapperton, Alpha	Episode: "Ape New World"
2004–2005	Dave the Barbarian	Narrator, Twinkle the Marvel Horse, various	
2004–2005	Megas XLR	Skalgar, Drallag, Zarek	
2004–2008	The Batman	Killer Moth, Ragdoll, D.A.V.E.	
2004–2009	Foster's Home for Imaginary Friends	Bloppypants, Bendy, additional voices	
2005–2006	The Buzz on Maggie	Principal Peststrip	
2005	American Dad!	Mahmood	Episode: "Stan of Arabia: Part 1"
2005	Teen Titans	Anchorman	Episode: "Don't Touch That Dial"
2005–2007	American Dragon: Jake Long	Jonathan Long, The Huntsman, Jaren MacArthur, Councilor Kulde, Petite Messenger Fairy, King Hammer, additional voices	
2005–2007	The Life and Times of Juniper Lee	Cletus, Skeeter Knommen Ghetit, Loki, Mummy, Mike	
2005–2008	Camp Lazlo	Raj, Samson, Commander Hoo-Ha, Walrus, additional voices	
2006	Justice League Unlimited	Rick Wilson	Episode: "Patriot Act"
2006	Danger Rangers	Henri Ennui, EMT, Factory Worker	Episode: "Medicine Mix-Up"
2006	Loonatics Unleashed	Colonel Trench, Dr. Fidel Chroniker, Professor Zane	
2006	Me, Eloise	Additional voices	
2006–2007	Shorty McShorts' Shorts	Frankie - Train Conductor	
2006–2007	Spider Riders	Stags	
2006–2008	Class of 3000	Principal Luna, various voices	
2006–2008	The Emperor's New School	Ipi, Topo, Security Cam	
2006–2008	Shaggy & Scooby-Doo Get a Clue!	Dr. Phinius Phibes, Agent #2, Techie #2, Dr. Eisenhorn	
2006–2009	The Replacements	Conrad Fleem, Shelton Klutzberry, Principal Cutler, additional voices	
2006–2015, 2018–2022	Curious George	Ted / The Man in the Yellow Hat, Mr. Renkins	
2007	El Tigre: The Adventures of Manny Rivera	Senor Siniestro	Episode: "Fool Speed Ahead/Ballad of Frida Suarez"
2007	Higglytown Heroes	Auctioneer Hero	Episode: "Big Pink Elephant Sale/Higglies on Horseback"
2007	Saul of the Mole Men	Clancy Burrows	
2007–2008	The Land Before Time	Petrie	
2007–2009	Tak and the Power of Juju	Gremlin Juju, Chief Zogsnob, Colonel, "Traloc"	
2007–2009	Transformers: Animated	Prowl, Ultra Magnus, Captain Fanzone, Angry Archer, Soundwave, Mixmaster	
2007, 2010	Chowder	Thrice Cream Man	2 episodes
2007–2011	Back at the Barnyard	Mayor, Youngblood, Horse, additional voices	
2008–2009	Random Cartoons	Additional voices	
2008–2009	The Spectacular Spider-Man	Montana / Shocker, St. John Devereaux, Bernard Houseman	
2008–2010	Ben 10: Alien Force	Azmuth, Zs'Skayr, Ghostfreak	
2008–2010	The Marvelous Misadventures of Flapjack	Peppermint Larry, Lady Nickelbottoms, additional voices	
2008–2010	The Secret Saturdays	Dr. Arthur Beeman, Barington, Old Monk, Newscaster #2	
2008–2010	Wow! Wow! Wubbzy!	Cupid, Fire Chief, Tall Chef, Easter Bunny	
2008–2011	Batman: The Brave and the Bold	Joker / Red Hood, Captain Marvel, OMAC, Starman, Rubberneck, Ultra-Humanite	
2008–2011	The Mighty B!	Additional voices	
2008–2013	Phineas and Ferb	Ben Baxter, Talking Zebra, Square Dance Singer, additional voices	
2008–2015	The Penguins of Madagascar	Kowalski, The Red Squirrel, The Amarillo Kid, Frankie the Pigeon, Computer, Chuck Charles, Chameleons	
2009–2014	Fanboy & Chum Chum	Boog, Lenny (Pilot only), Sigmund The Sorcerer, Mr. Hank Mufflin, Duke, Dollar-nator, Man-Arctica, Global Warmer, Necronomicon, Scrivener Elf, additional voices	
2010	Hero Factory	Xplode	
2010	Generator Rex	Meechum, Providence Agent	
2010–2011	Sym-Bionic Titan	Steve "Babyface" Stevens	
2010–2012	Ben 10: Ultimate Alien	Azmuth, Bellicus, Magister Labrid, Major General	
2010–2012	Kick Buttowski: Suburban Daredevil	Billy Stumps, Pansy and Mouth's Father / Mall Cop, Walter, Grubby Schmidt	
2010–2013	Planet Sheen	Dorkus, Grish, additional voices	
2010–2013	Pound Puppies	Additional voices	
2010–2013	Scooby-Doo! Mystery Incorporated	Gary, Professor Emmanuel Raffalo, Doogle McGuiness, Blaine LeFrank, Ugly Jimmy, Male Tourist, additional voices	
2010–2014	Fish Hooks	Principal Stikler, additional voices	Replaced Jerry Stiller in Season 2
2010–2015	T.U.F.F. Puppy	Keswick, Larry, Ollie, Sharing Moose, Gorilla, additional voices	
2010–2017	Regular Show	Party Pete, High-Five Ghost (season 1), additional voices	
2010–2017	Adventure Time	Choose Goose, additional voices	
2010–2021	Young Justice	Red Tornado, T. O. Morrow, Abra Kadabra, Alfred Pennyworth, Red Torpedo, Red Volcano, Wade Eiling, Jason Bard, Casey Klebba, Nuidis Vulko, Bernell Jones, David Wilcox, Television Announcer	
2011–2013	Dan Vs.	Jeff, Buddy Starr, Spencer Bainbridge, additional voices	
2011–2013	The Looney Tunes Show	Additional voices	
2011–2013	Winx Club	Audience Members	
2011–2016	Kung Fu Panda: Legends of Awesomeness	Tong Fo, Anvil of Heaven Guard, Prisoner	
2011–2016	Jake and the Never Land Pirates	Mr. Smee, Bones	
2011–2017	The Fairly OddParents	Fairy Elder, Father Time, Big Willy, Merman, Red Leader Dog, Dogman, Catman, Fair Bear, additional voices	
2012	Gravity Falls	The Summerween Trickster	Episode: "Summerween"
2012	Robot and Monster	Snap Winsome, Marf	2 episodes
2012	Motorcity	Carter, Wormy Gang Members	Episode: "Threat Level: Texas!"
2012–2013	Green Lantern: The Animated Series	Tomar-Re, Nigel Fortenberry	
2012–2016	Transformers: Rescue Bots	Huxley Prescott, Mayor Luskey, Deputy Barney	
2013	Pixie Hollow Bake Off	Clank, Fairy Gary	Short film
2013	Sofia the First	Farley	Episode: "The Floating Palace"
2013	Randy Cunningham: 9th Grade Ninja	Stache Society Leader	Episode: "Secret Stache"
2013	Teen Titans Go!	Ed	Episode: "Driver's Ed"
2013	Ultimate Spider-Man	Collector, Grandmaster, Mayor of Boston, Slam Adams	5 episodes
2013–2014	Beware the Batman	Simon Stagg	
2013–2014	Hulk and the Agents of S.M.A.S.H.	Collector	
2013–2014	Monsters vs. Aliens	Coverton, various voices	
2013–2016	Turbo FAST	Ace Gecko, Brahdhi, SB Sweaty, Grocery Clerk	
2014	Ben 10: Omniverse	Kundo, Alien Doctor, Bryk	
2014	Stan Lee's Mighty 7	Man in Black	
2014	Wander Over Yonder	Harvax, Brainz, additional voices	
2014–2015	The 7D	The Big Bad Wolf, Jack Flashback	
2014–2015	Clarence	Seymour Wendle	
2014–2017	All Hail King Julien	Hector, Willie, Horst	
2014–2017	Sheriff Callie's Wild West	Cody, Mr. Dillo, Doc Quackers	
2014–2025	Blaze and the Monster Machines	Additional voices	
2015	The Lion Guard: Return of the Roar	Zazu	Television film
2015	Mixels	Dribbal, Gurggle, Jinky, Camillot, Ranger Jinx	
2015–2016	SpongeBob SquarePants	Charlton, Food Vendor, Fancy Fish, Fish in Long Pants, Old Fish	2 episodes
2015–2017	Harvey Beaks	Doctor Roberts, Stempunk Fox, Stempunk Frog, Stempunk Butler, additional voices	
2015–2017	Penn Zero: Part-Time Hero	8 Ball	Episode: "Balls!"
2015–2017	Pig Goat Banana Cricket	Additional voices	
2015–2017	The Mr. Peabody & Sherman Show	Mark Twain, Harry Houdini, John Harington	
2015, 2017	Be Cool, Scooby-Doo!	Alistair Leventhal, Dr. Mezmit, Tour Bus Guide; Big Ed	2 episodes
2015–2018	Guardians of the Galaxy	Rhomann Dey, Wraith, Principal Philbin, various voices	
2015–2019	Star vs. the Forces of Evil	Principal, additional voices	
2015–2020	Shimmer and Shine	Home Base	Main role
2015–2021	If You Give a Mouse a Cookie	Dog	53 episodes
2016	Sofia the First	Merlin	Episode: "Gone With the Wand"
2016	Transformers: Robots in Disguise	Axiom and Theorem	Episode: "Brainpower"
2016	New Looney Tunes	Hubie and Bertie	Episode: "Appropriate Technology"
2016	Uncle Grandpa	Leprechaun	Episode: "The Lepre-Con"
2016	Teenage Mutant Ninja Turtles	Screwloose	Episode: "Bat in the Belfry"
2016	The Powerpuff Girls	Ace, additional voices	Episode: "Tiara Trouble"
2016	Lego Star Wars: The Freemaker Adventures	Lt. Plumestriker, Nien Nunb, Ignacio Wortan	4 episodes
2016–2019	The Lion Guard	Zazu	7 episodes
2016–present	The Loud House	Various voices	
2016–2020	Ben 10	Gust-O, Hail-O, Shock-O, Madcow, Wolfen Sheep	
2017	Mighty Magiswords	Sir Grimmsibald Femursworth	Episode: "The Tom of Morrow"
2017–2018	Bunsen Is a Beast	Bunsen's Dad, additional voices	
2017–2019	Elena of Avalor	King Lars, Felipe	3 episodes
2017–2023	Puppy Dog Pals	Johnathon, Cagey, Crumpet, Titus, Barry, Quinty Mcsquinty	59 episodes
2018–2021	Big Hero 6: The Series	Baron Von Steamer, Chef, Rich People, Security Guard, Waiter	10 episodes
2018–2019	Kung Fu Panda: The Paws of Destiny	Zhizhu	
2018	Voltron: Legendary Defender	Nortox	Episode: "The Feud"
2018	Mickey Mouse	Mortimer Mouse, The Director	2 episodes
2018–2019	The Stinky & Dirty Show	Towpher, Toots, additional voices	Recurring role
2019	Scooby-Doo and Guess Who?	Bobby, Beafeater Guard	Episode: "Elementary, My Dear Shaggy!"
2019	DreamWorks Dragons: Rescue Riders	Snoop	Recurring role
2019	The Rocketeer	Old Timey Announcer, Franklin	2 episodes
2019	Green Eggs and Ham	Ma Snerz	Episode: "Goat"
2019–2022	Big City Greens	F.R.A.N.K., additional voices	3 episodes
2019–2022	Abby Hatcher	Buck Diamond	9 episodes
2020–2021	Adventure Time: Distant Lands	Choose Goose, Limeston	
2020	DuckTales	Rescue Rangers, Eggheads, King Honestus	2 episodes
2020	Close Enough	Additional voices	2 episodes
2020	Kipo and the Age of Wonderbeasts	Hoag	
2020	Animaniacs	Louis XVI	Episode: "France France Revolution"
2020–2023	The Wonderful World of Mickey Mouse	Mortimer, Skeleton, Howdini, Merlin, additional voices	3 episodes
2021	Jungledyret Hugo	Dellekaj and Heath	9 episodes
2021	Amphibia	Tyler, Buffer Fish, additional voices	3 episodes
2021, 2023	The Ghost and Molly McGee	Complaining Old Man, Bizmart CEO	2 episodes
2022	Pretzel and the Puppies	Mr. Bernard, additional voices	5 episodes
2023	Adventure Time: Fionna and Cake	Evil Choose Goose, Choose Bruce	
2024	X-Men '97	Ford, American Judge, Burly Goon, Kree Commander	4 episodes
2025	Jellystone!	Johnny Bravo, Ace	Episode: "Crisis on Infinite Mirths"

=== Anime ===
List of dubbing performances in anime
Year	Title	Role	Note(s)
1998	Kiki's Delivery Service	Okino	Disney English dub
1999	My Neighbors the Yamadas	Additional voices	English dub
2003	Porco Rosso	Additional voices	Disney English dub
2005	Nausicaä of the Valley of the Wind	Gikkuri	Disney English dub
2005	Pom Poko	Additional voices	English dub
2006	Whisper of the Heart	Additional voices	English dub
2006	Tales from Earthsea	Advisor #1 (additional voices)	English dub
2007	Afro Samurai	Foo, Hachiro	English dub
2009	Afro Samurai: Resurrection	Brother 3	English dub

=== Video games ===
List of voice performances in video games
Year	Title	Role	Note(s)
1993	Leisure Suit Larry 6: Shape Up or Slip Out!	Gary the Towel Attendant	
1993	Gabriel Knight: Sins of the Fathers	Sam, Uniform Officer, Artist, Bruno, Lucky Dog Vendor, Motorcycle Cop	
1994	Quest for Glory IV: Shadows of Darkness	Dr. Cranium, Igor, Bonehead, Ad Avis	
1995	Stonekeep	Murph, Winkle	
1996	Someone's in the Kitchen!	Blub, Sir Eaton Scraps, Dendron	
1996	Goosebumps: Escape from HorrorLand	Pumpkins	
1996	Toonstruck	The Carecrow, Jim, Spike, Woof, Outhouse Guard, The Robot Maker	
1997	Fallout	Loxley	
1997	The Lost Vikings 2	Baleog the Fierce	
1997	Animaniacs Game Pack	Baloney	
1998	Rocky & Bullwinkle's Know-It-All Quiz Game	Mr. Peabody	
1998	Baldur's Gate	Xan, Drizzt Do'Urden, Dream Knight, Quayle	
1999	The Powerpuff Girls: Chemical X-Traction	Ace, Big Billy	
2000	102 Dalmatians: Puppies to the Rescue	Dipstick, Jasper, Shelby the Turtle	
2000	X-Squad	Judd	
2000	Star Wars: Force Commander	Brenn Tantor	
2000	Buzz Lightyear Second Grade	Hamm	
2000	Buzz Lightyear of Star Command	NOS-4-A2	
2000	Escape from Monkey Island	Marco de Pollo	
2000	102 Dalmatians: Puppies to the Rescue	Horace Badun, Waddlesworth	
2000	The Jungle Book Groove Party	Ziggy the Vulture	
2001	Disney-Pixar Learning: First Grade	Hamm	
2001	The Powerpuff Girls: Chemical X-Traction	Ace, Big Billy	
2001	Star Wars Rogue Squadron II: Rogue Leader	Imperial Officer	
2001	Star Wars: Galactic Battlegrounds	Jango Fett	
2001	Baldur's Gate II: Throne of Bhaal	Saemon Havarian, Cespenar, Cyric, Carras, Yakman, Carston	
2001	Stupid Invaders	Bud Bidiovitch, Stereo Monovici, Snail, Redneck, Spaceship Thief	
2002	Star Wars: Jedi Knight II: Jedi Outcast	Kyle Katarn	
2002	Star Wars: Jedi Starfighter	Jango Fett, Count Dooku	
2002	The Powerpuff Girls: Relish Rampage	Ace, Big Billy, Grubber, Arturo	
2002	Kingdom Hearts	The Mayor of Halloween Town, Barrel, Mr. Smee	
2003	Star Wars: Jedi Knight: Jedi Academy	Kyle Katarn	
2003	Tak and the Power of Juju	Caged Juju, Pins and Needles	
2004	Tak 2 The Staff of Dreams	JB, Caged Juju, Pins and Needles	
2004	Grand Theft Auto: San Andreas	Big Poppa Voice	Mission: A Home in the Hills
2004	Scooby-Doo! Mystery Mayhem	Alan Dinsdale, Walter Peabody, Robert Zabrinski, Travis Sherman, Mercenaries	
2004	Samurai Jack: The Shadow of Aku	Jack's Father, Extor, The Priest, Kami, Lead Kid	
2005	Tak: The Great Juju Challenge	Caged Juju, Belly Juju, Two-Head Rufus, Mummy King	
2005	Kingdom Hearts II	Barrel, Lumiere, Merlin	
2005	Chicken Little	Mayor Turkey Lurkey	
2006	The Legend of Spyro: A New Beginning	Cyril, Mole-Yair, Dad	
2006	Xiaolin Showdown	Clay Bailey	
2006	Cartoon Network Racing	Johnny Bravo, Dexter's Dad	
2007	The Legend of Spyro: The Eternal Night	Cyril, Mole-Yair, Scratch	
2007	Disney Princess: Enchanted Journey	Lumiere	
2008	The Legend of Spyro: Dawn of the Dragon	Cyril	
2008	Transformers Animated: The Game	Prowl, Ultra Magnus	
2009	Cartoon Network Universe: FusionFall	Johnny Bravo, Ace, Azmuth	
2009	Ghostbusters: The Video Game	Spider Witch's Victim	
2009	Ben 10 Alien Force: Vilgax Attacks	Azmuth, Bellicus, Ghostfreak	
2010	Ben 10 Ultimate Alien: Cosmic Destruction	Azmuth, Kraab	
2010	Crash Bandicoot Nitro Kart 2	Ripper Roo	
2010	Kingdom Hearts Birth by Sleep	Mr. Smee, Merlin, Bashful	
2011	Kinect Disneyland Adventures	Mr. Smee, White Rabbit, March Hare	
2011	Star Wars: The Old Republic	Revan	
2011	The Penguins of Madagascar: Dr. Blowhole Returns – Again!	Kowalski	
2011	Ben 10: Galactic Racing	Ghostfreak, Azmuth	
2012	Kingdom Hearts 3D: Dream Drop Distance	Geppetto, Beagle Boys	
2012	Disney Princess: My Fairytale Adventure	Lumiere, Man on Bridge, Baker #2	
2012	Epic Mickey 2: The Power of Two	Mr. Smee	
2013	Kingdom Hearts HD 1.5 Remix	The Mayor of Halloween Town, Barrel, Mr. Smee	
2013	Young Justice: Legacy	Psimon, Red Tornado	
2014	Disney Infinity 2.0: Marvel Super Heroes	The Collector	
2014	Kingdom Hearts HD 2.5 Remix	Lumiere, Mr. Smee, Merlin, Bashful	
2014	The Legend of Korra	Shiro Shinobi	
2015	SpongeBob HeroPants	Bubbles	
2015	Disney Infinity 3.0	Merlin	
2016	Lego Dimensions	Choose Goose	
2017	Kingdom Hearts HD 2.8 Final Chapter Prologue	Geppetto, Beagle Boys	
2019	Kingdom Hearts III	Merlin	
2022	Disney Dreamlight Valley	Merlin	

=== Live-action ===
List of acting performances in film
Year	Title	Role	Note(s)
2013	I Know That Voice	Himself	Documentary

=== Audiobooks ===
Year	Title	Role
2014	There Was an Old Lady Who Swallowed a Fly	Dog, Artist
2015	Rain of the Ghosts	Pete Grier, Shore Patrolman

=== Other ===
Year	Title	Role	Note(s)
2018	Ani-Mayhem	Foghorn Leghorn, Michigan J. Frog	

== Awards and nominations ==
Awards and nominations
Year	Award	Category	Title	Result
1997	Annie Awards	Voice Acting by a Male Performer in a TV Production	Johnny Bravo	Nominated
2012	Annie Awards	Voice Acting in an Animated Television Production	The Penguins of Madagascar	Won
2016	Daytime Emmy Awards	Outstanding Performer in an Animated Program	Transformers: Rescue Bots	Won
