= List of Cartoon Network video games =

Cartoon Network Games logo

This is a list of video games featuring various Cartoon Network characters based on original programming. The games are developed, published, or distributed by either its sister division Warner Bros. Interactive Entertainment or by outside third parties. This list does not include Internet-only games released only on the network's website or mobile apps.

Cartoon Network has created several MMOGs between 2009-2011. These Cartoon Network MMOGs were all presented under the name Cartoon Network Universe. The largest of these Cartoon Network MMOGs was Cartoon Network Universe: FusionFall which was released in early 2009.

== Games ==
=== Adventure Time ===
- Adventure Time
  - Hey Ice King! Why'd You Steal Our Garbage?!! (2012)
  - Explore the Dungeon Because I Don't Know! (2013)
  - The Secret of the Nameless Kingdom (2014)
  - Finn & Jake Investigations (2015)
  - Pirates of the Enchiridion (2018)

=== Batman: The Brave and the Bold ===
- Batman: The Brave and the Bold
  - Batman: The Brave and the Bold – The Videogame (2010)

=== Ben 10 ===
- Ben 10
  - Ben 10 (Hyperscan) (2006)
  - Protector of Earth (2007)
- Ben 10: Alien Force
  - Alien Force (2008)
  - Vilgax Attacks (2009)
  - The Rise of Hex (2010)
- Ben 10: Ultimate Alien
  - Cosmic Destruction (2010)
  - Galactic Racing (2011)
- Ben 10: Omniverse
  - Omniverse (2012)
  - Omniverse 2 (2013)
- Ben 10 (Reboot)
  - Ben 10 (2017 video game)
  - Ben 10: Power Trip (2020)

=== Camp Lazlo ===
- Camp Lazlo
  - Leaky Lake Games (2006)

=== Codename: Kids Next Door ===
- Codename: Kids Next Door
  - Operation: S.O.D.A. (2004)
  - Operation: V.I.D.E.O.G.A.M.E. (2005)

=== DC Super Hero Girls ===
- DC Super Hero Girls
  - DC Super Hero Girls: Teen Power (2021)

=== Dexter's Laboratory ===
- Dexter's Laboratory
  - Robot Rampage (2000)
  - Deesaster Strikes! (2001)
  - Science Ain't Fair! (2001)
  - Mandark's Lab? (2002)
  - Chess Challenge (2002)

=== Ed, Edd n Eddy ===
- Ed, Edd n Eddy
  - Jawbreakers! (2003)
  - The Mis-Edventures (2005)
  - Scam of the Century (2007)

=== The Flintstones ===
- The Flintstones
  - Bedrock Bowling (2000)
  - Big Trouble in Bedrock (2001)

=== Foster's Home for Imaginary Friends ===
- Foster's Home for Imaginary Friends
  - Foster's Home for Imaginary Friends (2006)
  - Imagination Invaders (2007)

=== Generator Rex ===
- Generator Rex
  - Agent of Providence (2011)

=== The Grim Adventures of Billy & Mandy ===
- The Grim Adventures of Billy & Mandy
  - The Grim Adventures of Billy & Mandy (2006)

=== Hi Hi Puffy AmiYumi ===
- Hi Hi Puffy AmiYumi
  - Kaznapped! (2005)
  - The Genie and the Amp (2006)

=== IGPX: Immortal Grand Prix ===
- IGPX: Immortal Grand Prix
  - IGPX: Immortal Grand Prix (2006)

=== Johnny Bravo ===
- Johnny Bravo
  - The Hukka-Mega-Mighty-Ultra-Extreme Date-O-Rama (2009)

=== Justice League ===
- Justice League
  - Justice League: Injustice for All (2002)
  - Justice League: Chronicles (2003)

=== OK K.O.! Let's Be Heroes ===
- OK K.O.! Let's Be Heroes
  - Let's Play Heroes (2018)

=== The Powerpuff Girls ===
- The Powerpuff Girls
  - Bad Mojo Jojo (2000)
  - Paint the Townsville Green (2000)
  - Mojo Jojo's Pet Project (2001)
  - Battle Him (2001)
  - Cartoon Snapshot (2001)
  - Mojo Jojo A-Go-Go! (2001)
  - Chemical X-Traction (2001)
  - Relish Rampage (2002)
  - Gamesville (2002)
  - Him & Seek (2002)
  - Mojo Jojo's Clone Zone
  - Princess Snorebucks

=== Powerpuff Girls Z ===
- Powerpuff Girls Z
  - Game de Demashita! Powerpuff Girls Z (2007)

=== The Real Adventures of Jonny Quest ===
- The Real Adventures of Jonny Quest
  - Jonny Quest: Cover-Up at Roswell (1996)

=== Regular Show ===
- Regular Show
  - Mordecai and Rigby in 8-Bit Land (2013)

=== Samurai Jack ===
- Samurai Jack
  - The Amulet of Time (2003)
  - The Shadow of Aku (2004)
  - Samurai Jack: Battle Through Time (2020)

=== Scooby-Doo ===
- Scooby-Doo
  - Scooby-Doo Mystery (1995)
  - Scooby-Doo! Mystery of the Fun Park Phantom (1999)
  - Scooby-Doo! Mystery Adventures (2000)
  - Scooby-Doo! Classic Creep Capers (2000)
  - Scooby-Doo and the Cyber Chase (2001)
  - Scooby-Doo! Night of 100 Frights (2002)
  - Scooby-Doo! Mystery Mayhem (2004)
  - Scooby-Doo! Unmasked (2005)
  - Scooby-Doo! Who's Watching Who? (2006)
  - Scooby-Doo! First Frights (2009)
  - Scooby-Doo! and the Spooky Swamp (2010)

=== The Secret Saturdays ===
- The Secret Saturdays
  - Beasts of the 5th Sun (2009)

=== Steven Universe ===
- Steven Universe
  - Attack the Light (2015)
  - Save the Light (2017)
  - Unleash the Light (2019)

=== Teen Titans ===
- Teen Titans
  - Teen Titans (2005)
  - Teen Titans (2006)
  - Teen Titans 2 (2006)

=== Transformers: Animated ===
- Transformers: Animated
  - Transformers Animated: The Game (2008)

=== Tom and Jerry ===
- Tom and Jerry
  - Fists of Furry (2000)
  - House Trap (2000)
  - War of the Whiskers (2002)
  - Infurnal Escape (2003)

=== Young Justice ===
- Young Justice
  - Young Justice: Legacy (2013)

== Games based on multiple shows ==
- Cartoon Network 'Toon Jam! (1995; PC game)
- Cartoon Network Speedway (2003)
- Cartoon Network: Block Party (2004)
- Cartoon Network Racing (2006)
- Cartoon Network Universe: FusionFall (2009)
- Cartoon Network: Punch Time Explosion (2011)
- Cartoon Network Universe: Project Exonaut (2011)
- Cartoon Network Universe: FusionFall Heroes (2013)
- Cartoon Network: Superstar Soccer (2014)
- Cartoon Network: Backlot Party (Cancelled; planned for 2015)
- Lego Dimensions (2015–2017)
- Cartoon Network: Battle Crashers (2016)
- Cartoon Network Match Land (2018)
- MultiVersus (2022–2025)

== See also ==
- List of video games based on cartoons
- List of The Powerpuff Girls video games
- List of Cartoon Network films
- List of programs broadcast by Cartoonito
- List of programs broadcast by Adult Swim
- List of programs broadcast by Boomerang
- List of programs broadcast by Toonami
- List of programs broadcast by Discovery Family
- List of Cartoon Network Studios productions
- Hanna-Barbera Studios Europe filmography
