= The Powerpuff Girls (franchise) =

American animated media franchise

- Created by: Craig McCracken
- Original work: Whoopass Stew! (1992)
- Owners: The Cartoon Network, Inc. (Skydance)
- Years: 1992–present

Print publications
- Comics: The Powerpuff Girls (2000–2006); Powerpuff Girls Z (2006–2007); The Powerpuff Girls (2013–2014); The Powerpuff Girls (2016–2017); The Powerpuff Girls (2024–present)

Films and television
- Film: The Powerpuff Girls Movie (2002)
- Television series: The Powerpuff Girls (1998–2005); Powerpuff Girls Z (2006–2007); The Powerpuff Girls (2016–2019)
- Television specials: The Powerpuff Girls: 'Twas the Fight Before Christmas (2003); The Powerpuff Girls Rule!!! (2009); The Powerpuff Girls: Dance Pantsed (2014)

Games
- Video games: Bad Mojo Jojo (2000); Paint the Townsville Green (2000); Battle HIM (2002); Mojo Jojo A-Go-Go (2001); Mojo Jojo's Pet Project (2001); Chemical X-Traction (2001); HIM and Seek (2002); Mojo Jojo's Clone Zone (2002); Gamesville (2002); Relish Rampage (2002); Learning Challenge (2002); Princess Snorebucks (2004); Cartoon Network Racing (2006); Game de Demashita! Powerpuff Girls Z (2007); Cartoon Network Universe: FusionFall (2009); Cartoon Network: Punch Time Explosion (2011); Defenders of Townsville (2014); Lego Dimensions (2015); Powerpuff Yourself (2016); Glitch Fixers (2016); Monkey Mania (2019)

The Powerpuff Girls is an American animated media franchise created by animator Craig McCracken and produced by Hanna-Barbera (later Cartoon Network Studios). The franchise originated on the cartoon short Whoopass Stew! in 1992 and centers on Blossom, Bubbles and Buttercup, a trio of genetically engineered young girls with superpowers. They live in the fictional city of Townsville with their father and creator, the scientist Professor Utonium, where-in they are frequently called upon by the city's mayor in order to help fight criminals and other enemies using their powers.

The Powerpuff Girls is a multimedia franchise trademarked by The Cartoon Network, Inc. It began with the television series that aired between November 1998 and March 2005, later spawning a film in 2002, an anime adaptation in 2006 and the reboot in 2016. Spanning 33 years, it is Cartoon Network's longest existing franchise to date. There is also The Powerpuff Girls toy line manufactured by Trendmasters for the first two series and Spin Master for the 2016 reboot.

Three 44-minute specials based on the series have been released: The Powerpuff Girls: Twas the Fight Before Christmas, The Powerpuff Girls Rule!!!, and Powerpuff Girls: Dance Pantsed, while a crossover with Teen Titans Go! and the 2016 series was also developed.

== Television series ==
Series	Season	Episodes	Originally released		Showrunner(s)
Series	Season	Episodes	First released	Last released	Showrunner(s)
The Powerpuff Girls	1	13	November 18, 1998	May 27, 1999	Craig McCracken
The Powerpuff Girls	2	13	June 25, 1999	June 30, 2000	Craig McCracken
The Powerpuff Girls	3	13	July 28, 2000	April 6, 2001	Craig McCracken
The Powerpuff Girls	4	12	April 14, 2001	December 13, 2002	Craig McCracken
The Powerpuff Girls	5	12	September 5, 2003	April 9, 2004	Chris Savino
The Powerpuff Girls	6	15	April 16, 2004	March 25, 2005	Chris Savino
Powerpuff Girls Z	1	52	July 1, 2006	June 30, 2007	Megumu Ishiguro; Yoshio Urasawa
The Powerpuff Girls	1	39	April 4, 2016	December 1, 2016	Nick Jennings; Bob Boyle
The Powerpuff Girls	2	40	March 3, 2017	May 13, 2018	Nick Jennings; Bob Boyle
The Powerpuff Girls	3	40	April 8, 2018	June 16, 2019	Nick Jennings; Bob Boyle

=== The Powerpuff Girls (1998–2005) ===
Craig McCracken originally developed The Powerpuff Girls in 1992 as a cartoon short entitled Whoopass Stew! while in his second year at CalArts. The series made its official debut as a Cartoon Cartoon on November 18, 1998, with the final episode airing on March 25, 2005. The series centers on Blossom, Bubbles and Buttercup, three kindergarten-aged girls with superpowers. The girls all live in the fictional city of Townsville with their father and creator, a scientist named Professor Utonium, and are frequently called upon by the city's mayor to help fight nearby criminals and other enemies using their powers.

=== Powerpuff Girls Z (2006–2007) ===
Powerpuff Girls Z (出ましたっ！パワパフガールズZ, Demashita! Pawapafu Gāruzu Zetto; lit. They're Here! Powerpuff Girls Z) is a 2006 Japanese magical girl anime series based on the original The Powerpuff Girls, co-produced by Cartoon Network Japan and Aniplex and animated by Toei Animation. The series featured character designs by Miho Shimogasa, the character designer of Cutie Honey Flash and Ultra Maniac and animation director of Sailor Moon, deviating from the original series in terms of genre and animation style. Powerpuff Girls Z was aired in Japan on TV Tokyo between July 1, 2006, and June 30, 2007. In addition to Cartoon Network Japan, the anime was also broadcast on AT-X.

=== The Powerpuff Girls (2016–2019) ===
Cartoon Network announced on June 16, 2014, that The Powerpuff Girls reboot was to be produced by Cartoon Network Studios. Amanda Leighton, Kristen Li, and Natalie Palamides were announced as the new voice actors of the main characters, playing Blossom, Bubbles, and Buttercup, respectively, replacing the original voice actors Cathy Cavadini, Tara Strong, and Elizabeth Daily. However, Tom Kenny reprises his roles as the Mayor and narrator, while Tom Kane reprises his roles as Professor Utonium and Him. In April 2016, Jennings revealed that the producers had considered bringing back the original voice actors for the new series, but decided that recasting the roles would infuse new energy. After the network revealed multiple promotional images from the new series in June 2015, writers from news sites described the visual look as similar to the original series, despite the 15th-anniversary special Dance Pantsed, which was broadcast on January 20, 2014, featuring a different art style rendered in 3D. Meanwhile, Roger L. Jackson reprises as Mojo Jojo and Jennifer Hale reprises as Ms. Keane, but not as Princess Morbucks. On May 26, 2016, Natalie Palamides confirmed that the series has been renewed for a second season. The reboot had a crossover with Teen Titans Go! that aired on June 30, 2016. On September 17, 2017, a new and fourth Powerpuff Girl named Bliss was added in a five-part special of the reboot, "The Power of Four". Prior to the announcement, a one-shot footage of Bliss was leaked on Cartoon Network Russia.

== Cast and characters ==
The main characters include Blossom, Bubbles, and Buttercup, along with supporting characters Professor Utonium, Ms. Keane, Ms. Bellum, and the Mayor, and villains Mojo Jojo, Fuzzy Lumpkins, HIM, Princess Morbucks, Sedusa, the Gangreen Gang, the Amoeba Boys, and the Rowdyruff Boys.

== Films ==
Film	U.S. release date	Directed by	Written by	Produced by	Status
The Powerpuff Girls Movie	July 3, 2002	Craig McCracken	Story by : Craig McCracken, Charlie Bean, Lauren Faust, Amy Keating Rogers, Paul Rudish & Don Shank; Screenplay by : Craig McCracken, Charlie Bean, Lauren Faust, Paul Rudish & Don Shank	Donna Castricone	Released

=== The Powerpuff Girls Movie (2002) ===
The film serves as a prequel to the series, the film tells the origin story of how the Powerpuff Girls were created and how they came to be the defenders of Townsville.

=== Untitled Powerpuff Girls film ===
At the 2026 Annecy Film Festival, a new Powerpuff Girls film was announced to be in development at Warner Bros. Pictures Animation.

== Specials ==
=== The Powerpuff Girls: 'Twas the Fight Before Christmas (2003) ===
The Christmas special promotes minor antagonist Princess Morbucks to the position of main antagonist, following her as she attempts to trick Santa Claus into physically transforming her into a fourth Powerpuff Girl, while in the process making him believe that the Powerpuff Girls have been "very, very naughty".

=== The Powerpuff Girls Rule!!! (2009) ===
In August 2008, McCracken revealed on his DeviantArt account, as had been announced in that year's Comic Con, that he was working with Cartoon Network on a new half-hour Powerpuff Girls special to celebrate the series' tenth anniversary. The 22-minute special, titled "The Powerpuff Girls Rule!!!", aired on the Pan-Euro Cartoon Network on November 29, 2008, on the Powerpuff Girls Birthday Marathon, and in the United States on January 19, 2009, as part of its 10th-anniversary marathon. Unlike previous episodes in the series, the anniversary special was animated using Adobe Flash at Cartoon Network Studios. Originally an idea for season 4, the special was meant to be the final episode of the series, but Cartoon Network was against giving their series a definitive ending at the time.

=== The Powerpuff Girls: Dance Pantsed (2014) ===
On January 28, 2013, a new CGI special titled Powerpuff Girls: Dance Pantsed was announced to premiere that year, though it was later delayed to January 20, 2014, intended to serve as a potential pilot for a new The Powerpuff Girls series. Former Beatle Ringo Starr promoted the special on Cartoon Network, singing a new original song "I Wish I Was a Powerpuff Girl" with previews leading up to the airdate. Starr also voiced a new character named Fibonacci Sequins in the episode. The special was directed by Dave Smith, who directed episodes for the series in the past, featuring the original cast members reprising their roles. This Powerpuff Girls special marked the first time that series creator Craig McCracken had no input. The main plot sees Mojo Jojo kidnap Fibonacci alongside an opera singer and a badger. After the Powerpuff Girls rescue them all and defeat Mojo, an undeterred Mojo then goes on to invent an evil video game called "Dance Pants R-EVILution" (a parody of the video game Dance Dance Revolution) to take over Townsville.

=== TTG v PPG (2016) ===
This episode was produced by Warner Bros. Animation primarily in the same art style as Teen Titans Go! despite being an episode of The Powerpuff Girls, making it the first episode produced by a studio other than Cartoon Network Studios since 1998 The Powerpuff Girls series episode "Superfriends". After using a repellent to temporarily hinder Blossom, Bubbles, and Buttercup, Mojo Jojo uses a teleportation device to teleport himself to Jump City in the Teen Titans Go! universe. There, he recruits an oblivious Beast Boy and Cyborg to help him build his monkey army. The girls try to follow him, only to run into Robin, Raven, and Starfire. Rather than showing concern for their predicament, the Titans then proceed to rope the girls into a contest to see who's the better team over the goal of stopping Mojo.

== Cancelled projects ==
=== Powerpuff ===
On August 24, 2020, a live-action television series based on The Powerpuff Girls was announced to be in development at the CW, according to Variety. It was planned to depict Blossom, Bubbles, and Buttercup as "disillusioned twentysomethings" resentful at losing their childhood to fighting crime and faced with the choice of reuniting "when the world needs them more than ever". The project, produced by Warner Bros. Television Studios, was written by Heather Regnier and Diablo Cody, who were also reported to potentially serve as executive producers with Greg Berlanti, Sarah Schechter, and David Madden. Craig McCracken was not involved; however, he declared his liking of Berlanti's superhero shows and admitted he was "curious" to see what they do with their adaptation. A pilot was officially ordered on February 9, 2021, and Maggie Kiley was hired as the director. Variety later reported that Chloe Bennet, Dove Cameron, and Yana Perrault were cast as Blossom, Bubbles, and Buttercup, respectively. On March 30, 2021, following the title change to Powerpuff, Donald Faison was cast in the role of Professor Drake Utonium, retaining the character's first name from Powerpuff Girls Z. On April 1, Nicholas Podany was cast as Joseph "Jojo" Mondel Jr., the son of Mojo Jojo. On April 7, 2021, production on the pilot began. On April 9, 2021, Robyn Lively was cast as Sara Bellum and Tom Kenny was confirmed to be reprising his role as the narrator from the original series. However, on May 18, 2023, the CW announced that the series had been cancelled by its new majority owners, Nexstar Media Group. On July 5, it was reported that the series was no longer in development at Warner Bros. TV. On March 6, 2025, a full-length trailer of the series' pilot was leaked by Lost Media Busters on YouTube. It was later taken down by Warner Bros. Entertainment Inc. that same day.

=== Second reboot ===
On July 18, 2022, a second Powerpuff Girls reboot was announced with Craig McCracken returning as the creator, director, and producer. This reboot was meant to revisit and expand upon the world of the original series as Blossom, Bubbles, and Buttercup would have faced off against a variety of old and new villains and it would have been produced by Hanna-Barbera Studios Europe (which would have been the first Powerpuff Girls franchise not to be produced by Cartoon Network Studios since the What a Cartoon! shorts of The Powerpuff Girls). As of July 2024, the untitled second reboot was in development. However, Warner Bros. ultimately discarded McCracken's concept for a serialized new Powerpuff Girls series, as the nature of how animated shows are greenlit kept constantly changing at the company, also based on the interests of potential buyers like Netflix.

== Other media ==
=== Whoopass Stew ===
The first incarnation of the Powerpuff Girls was a short titled "Whoopass Stew", which he made during his time as a student at the California Institute of the Arts. Much more adult oriented, the backstory of the Powerpuff Girls, here known as the Whoopass Girls, is very much the same. The extra ingredient is not Chemical X, but a "can of whoopass". The short is four minutes long, and introduces the Powerpuff Girls, Professor Utonium, the Narrator, The Gangreen Gang, who are only depicted in the short's opening, and the Amoeba Boys. The main plot of the short is titled "A Sticky Situation" in which the Amoeba Boys are robbing the bank. The Whoopass Girls go to stop them, which results in the Amoeba Boys getting stuck to them. The girls then quickly fly up to the sun where the Amoeba Boys are painfully melted off of them, presumably killing them. There were three other Whoopass Girl shorts that Craig made, but never finished. They saw the light of day in the 10th Anniversary Complete Collection DVD set.

=== What a Cartoon! shorts ===
Two Powerpuff Girls pilot shorts were released on the cartoon anthology series What a Cartoon!.

==== Meat Fuzzy Lumpkins ====
The Powerpuff Girls host a jam making competition, one of the contestants being Fuzzy Lumpkins, in his first appearance. Also first appearing in this short are the Mayor and Miss Keane. By not picking Fuzzy's meat jam as the winner, Fuzzy vows revenge on Townsville, making a gun that transforms whatever it shoots into meat and eating said transformed meat. The girls are called into action and face Fuzzy, in the ensuing battle, one of Bubbles' pigtails gets turned into meat, infuriating her. Fuzzy is defeated by Bubbles, and defeated by being turned into meat by his own Meat Gun.

==== Crime 101 ====
The Amoeba Boys, in their second appearance, decide to get the Powerpuff Girls to fight them by committing a "crime of the century". However, they are incredibly inefficient at doing crimes, only doing basic misdemeanors like jaywalking. Reluctantly, the girls decide to teach them how to be proper criminals by having them rob a bank. After the girls end up accidentally robbing the bank in order to show the Amoeba Boys what to do, they're arrested. At their trial, before the judge can sentence them, the Amoeba Boys interrupt, asking the girls what to do with the money. This results in the boys being arrested, much to their delight, and the girls free of all wrongdoing.

=== Video games ===
The game franchise has many different formats. The video games franchise started in 2000 with the release of The Powerpuff Girls: Bad Mojo Jojo for the Game Boy Color, developed by Sennari Interactive, published by BAM! Entertainment and distributed by Cartoon Network Interactive and Warner Bros. Interactive Entertainment.

=== Comic books ===
Developed by Genndy Tartakovsky, The Powerpuff Girls comic series revolves around the continued adventures of the Powerpuff Girls, set during and after the events of the original series. The first comic run, an adaptation of the original animated series, was published by DC Comics between 2000 and 2006, running for 70 issues. The series was preceded by a story in Cartoon Network Presents #1 (1999) written and penciled by McCracken (with Tartakovsky as co-writer).

A manga adaptation of Powerpuff Girls Z, illustrated by Shiho Komiyuno, was serialized in Shueisha's Ribon magazine between June 2006 and July 2007.

From 2013 to 2017, IDW Publishing published comics based on the characters. IDW's adaptation of the original series ran from 2013 to 2014. The 2015 IDW miniseries The Powerpuff Girls: Super Smash-Up! features the titular characters teaming up with other characters from Cartoon Network television series such as Dexter's Laboratory, Courage the Cowardly Dog, and Johnny Bravo.

In 2014, a cover illustration by Mimi Yoon was pulled by Cartoon Network due to complaints of sexualization.

The IDW comics based on the 2016 series written by Halen Macini and Jake Goldman was published from 2016 to 2017. The first miniseries The Powerpuff Girls: The Time Tie features the titular characters trying to escape the dimension they are stuck in. The second and final miniseries The Powerpuff Girls: Bureau of Bad features the villains to explain why they want to destroy the Powerpuff Girls. Such as Princess, the Fashionistas and Mojo, who explain their backstories about the Powerpuff Girls.

On October 12, 2023, Dynamite announced a deal with Warner Bros. Discovery to create a new line of comics based on various properties, including The Powerpuff Girls. On April 22, 2024, the creative team was announced as writer Kelly Thompson and artist Paulina Ganucheau. The comic was released in July 17, 2024.

== The Powerpuff Girls elsewhere on Cartoon Network ==
=== References in other shows ===
- In the Foster's Home For Imaginary Friends three-part episode, "House of Bloo's", Mojo Jojo makes a cameo appearance.
- In the Chowder episode "The Hot Date", Miss Bellum makes an appearance as someone's date, proclaiming that she got caught up because "the town" was being attacked again by monsters. In "The Heist" episode, Bubbles's head briefly appears when Mung Daal tastes the pink diamond with his tongue.
- In the Evil Con Carne episode "Ultimate Evil", Blossom, Bubbles, and Buttercup make an appearance.
- At the end of The Grim Adventures of Billy & Mandy episode "My Fair Mandy", Grim, Mandy, and Billy ended up in the universe of The Powerpuff Girls taking the roles of Blossom, Bubbles, and Buttercup, respectively, due to the effects of Mandy smiling. Professor Utonium then shows up, mentioning Mojo Jojo (played by Irwin) to have broken into the theatre without paying, before the three go out to stop him. Tom Kenny reprises his role as the Narrator.
- At the end of Codename: Kids Next Door and The Grim Adventures of Billy & Mandy crossover episode, "The Grim Adventures of the KND", Blossom, Bubbles, and Buttercup briefly appear popping out of the Delightful Reaper.
- In the OK K.O.! Let's Be Heroes episode "Crossover Nexus", Buttercup makes a cameo appearance as one of the characters Ben Tennyson briefly turns into. The Talking Dog also appears as one of the heroes that were summoned by Strike.
- The Samurai Jack episode "The Samurai Called Jack" partially takes place in the ruins of Townsville, where Aku has enslaved its futuristic dog-creature descendants.
- In the Courage the Cowardly Dog episode "The Ride of the Valkyries", a poster of The Powerpuff Girls appears.
- A crossover parody of The Powerpuff Girls and 2 Broke Girls was done in the second season of the Cartoon Network series MAD, known as "2 Broke Powerpuff Girls". The episode, which aired on January 30, 2012, is of Bubbles and Buttercup, who are broke and work for "Him" in a diner after the show got placed on permanent hiatus. Tara Strong (Bubbles) and Tom Kane ("Him") reprised their roles here. The MAD episode with the parody ranked No. 26/30 for the week with 1.903 million viewers. Blossom also appears in the sketch "Once Upon a Toon". Mojo Jojo appeared in the sketches "The Celebrity Ape-rentice", "I Am Lorax", and "Who Wore it Better?".
- The 2016 incarnations of Blossom, Bubbles, and Buttercup appeared in "The Grampies", the short accompanying the Uncle Grandpa episode "Pizza Eve", along with other Cartoon Network characters from currently running and ended cartoons. Buttercup had a speaking role in that short.
- At the end of Steven Universe and Uncle Grandpa crossover episode, "Say Uncle", Blossom, Bubbles, and Buttercup's names appear on a list.
- In the Teen Titans Go! episode "Warner Bros. 100th Anniversary", Blossom, Bubbles, Buttercup, and Mojo Jojo made cameo appearances. They appeared as guests to Warner Bros. studio centennial anniversary party.
- In a similar vein to the aforementioned "Crossover Nexus", the girls, Jojo, the Mayor, and Ace all appear in the Jellystone! crossover special, "Crisis on Infinite Mirths". Per a request from McCracken, a rendition of Bubbles from the 2016 reboot appears as a gag.

=== Cartoon Network promotion ===
==== Bumpers ====
In a 2004 bumper to promote Samurai Jack and Johnny Bravo, featuring the titular characters of each doing their laundry together, Blossom makes a cameo appearance retrieving her dress from a washing machine, leaving Jack's robes colored pink.

==== Cartoon Network Universe: FusionFall ====
The Powerpuff Girls appear in the game as playable characters, with their character designs changed to be more realistic compared to other Cartoon Network properties such as Ben 10. In the game, Bubbles and Blossom work together after Buttercup is apparently killed by Mojo Jojo. While Professor Utonium and Blossom refuse to believe that she is gone, Bubbles is shown to be engulfed in anger and stronger than ever. Blossom also serves as the character mission guide if the main guide is selected as Dexter from Dexter's Laboratory.

==== Cartoon Network: Punch Time Explosion ====
The Powerpuff Girls appear in the game as playable characters, with the primary character being Buttercup, freed from the corruption of the Null Void by Chowder and Ben Tennyson. Blossom and Bubbles are "summons" in the game. After the three find Vilgax and are brought to Primus to fight Ultimate Kevin Levin before Vilgax's escape, they are saved by Dexter, who allows them access to a machine he built that allows them to travel between different dimensions, using it to return to Buttercup's own, where she reunited with Blossom and Bubbles, defeating Mojo Jojo on a rampage in a giant robot before their dimension is destroyed, returning home following saving the universe from the Announcer's remote.

== Merchandise ==
Following the success of The Powerpuff Girls animated TV series and films, various The Powerpuff Girls merchandise has been released for general sale. These items include comic books, board games, card games (such as Top Trumps), video games, Lego construction sets, bedding, coloring books, and footwear. All three animated shows have also been released on DVD.

=== Home video ===
The Powerpuff Girls was released on both VHS and DVD throughout its run on television from 2000 to 2003.

The first season in its entirely was released on DVD on June 19, 2007 to commemorate the 15th anniversary of franchise's inception in 1992.

For the 10th anniversary of the show, a complete series dvd compilation of the first TV series was released on January 20, 2009. A re-issue of this set was released on May 21, 2024.

=== Toy lines ===
From 1999 to 2002, Trendmasters made Powerpuff Girls dolls and action figures. From August 21 to October 1, 2000, Subway promoted the series with four toys in their kids' meals. A set of six kids' meal toys was available as part of an April 2001 Dairy Queen promotion, which also included a sweepstakes offering the Powerpuff Girls VHS Boogie Frights. Jack in the Box released six Powerpuff Girls toys in July 2002 as a tie-in for The Powerpuff Girls Movie. On February 10, 2003, Burger King began a four-week promotion featuring The Powerpuff Girls and Dragon Ball Z toys as well as special codes to redeem online for Cartoon Network's Cartoon Orbit. In the United Kingdom, the characters of Buttercup and Mojo Jojo were given away in Kellogg's cereal boxes as part of the Cartoon Network Wobble Heads in 2003.

Before the 2016 series premiered, a promotional toy line was announced to be released in 2016 by Spin Master, with more toys released in 2017. The toys include the new 2-in-1 playsets and more. A McDonald's Happy Meal promotion for the series ran from June 14 to July 5, 2016, in the United States, including mini action figures, rings, and collectibles. On August 24, 2018, 2 Lego sets were released in the United States and United Kingdom.

In 2026, The Powerpuff Girls had a collaboration with Sanrio and made a collection of merch with the popular characters of Hello Kitty, Cinnamoroll, and Kuromi as Blossom, Bubbles, and Buttercup respectively. The line included blind box figures, plushies, clothes, and more.
