= List of The Powerpuff Girls video games =

The Powerpuff Girls video games are a series of action and platformer games based on Cartoon Network's animated series, The Powerpuff Girls. They were published by BAM! Entertainment and distributed by Cartoon Network Interactive and Warner Bros. Interactive Entertainment. Nintendo Game Boy and Game Boy Advance games include Bad Mojo Jojo, Paint the Townsville Green, Battle HIM, HIM and Seek, Mojo Jojo A-Go-Go, and the Powerpuff Girls Z game Game de Demashita! Powerpuff Girls Z. Console games include Chemical X-Traction for the Nintendo 64 and PlayStation and Relish Rampage for GameCube and PlayStation 2. Microsoft Windows games include Mojo Jojo's Clone Zone, Gamesville, Princess Snorebucks, Mojo Jojo's Pet Project, and Defenders of Townsville.

The Powerpuff Girls have also been featured in the Cartoon Network games Cartoon Network Racing for PlayStation 2 and Nintendo DS, the massively multiplayer online game Cartoon Network Universe: FusionFall, and Cartoon Network: Punch Time Explosion/XL for Nintendo 3DS, Wii, Xbox 360, and PlayStation 3.

== Games ==
=== Handheld ===
- The Powerpuff Girls: Bad Mojo Jojo was developed by Sennari Interactive for the Game Boy Color. It was released in North America on November 14, 2000. Bad Mojo Jojo follows Blossom, the leader of the Powerpuff Girls, as she fights Mojo Jojo and his henchmen. Blossom can fly for a short period of time. GameSpot cites this as a key problem, as whenever Blossom falls into water, the player not only loses a life, but any progress in collecting required trinkets throughout the level is reset to nothing. Another aspect of the game is that the player takes the role of Bubbles, Buttercup, the Rowdyruff Boys, Brick, Boomer, Butch, and the Mayor of Townsville through the use of entering passwords, which can be used to unlock special features like unlimited flight.
- The Powerpuff Girls: Paint the Townsville Green was developed by Sennari Interactive for the Game Boy Color. It was released in North America on November 21, 2000. This installment follows Buttercup as she fights the Gangreen Gang. The game is similar to Bad Mojo Jojo, for the sake of being able to trade cards between the two games when they are linked together.
- The Powerpuff Girls: Battle Him was developed by Sennari Interactive for the Game Boy Color. It was released on February 23, 2001. Unlike the other two games, Battle HIM follows Bubbles as she fights HIM and his henchmen, and plays very similar to the first two, for the sake of being able to trade cards between the three when two are linked together.
- The Powerpuff Girls: Mojo Jojo A-Go-Go centers around the name of the Powerpuff Girls' mission to stop Mojo Jojo and his minions. The game was developed by Sennari Interactive in 2001 and it is available for the Game Boy Advance.
- The Powerpuff Girls: HIM and Seek was developed by Vicarious Visions for the Game Boy Advance, released on October 29, 2002. It is a role-playing video game, in which the player can play as all three girls searching for scavenger hunt items while fighting Mojo Jojo, Fuzzy Lumpkins, Princess Morbucks, The Gangreen Gang, and HIM.
- Game de Demashita! Powerpuff Girls Z (ゲームで出ましたっ! パワパフ ガールズ Z, Gēmu de Demashita! Pawāpafu Gāruzu Zetto) is a party video game based on the spin-off series, Powerpuff Girls Z, which was released in Japan for the Nintendo DS on June 14, 2007.

=== Console ===
- The Powerpuff Girls: Chemical X-Traction was developed by VIS Entertainment and Asylum Entertainment Ltd. It was released in North America for the Nintendo 64 (N64) on October 14, 2001, and for the PlayStation on November 8, 2001. The Powerpuff Girls must battle enemies in a variety of settings in order to reclaim Chemical X and track down Mojo Jojo. Players can play the story mode or can battle against a friend in a head-to-head battle. In the story mode, players can pick up objects and throw them at an enemy to decrease their opponents health meter. They can use superpowered attacks by collecting vials of Chemical X. If the player successfully defeats the enemy in two out of three rounds, they move to the next enemy location.
- The Powerpuff Girls: Relish Rampage is a game developed by VIS Entertainment. It was originally released on the PlayStation 2 on November 24, 2002 in North America, and December 13, 2002 in Europe, but was later produced for the GameCube in Europe on December 13, 2002 and in North America on December 15, 2003. In the game the player plays the three Powerpuff Girls and must fly around a 3D world solving puzzles in an attempt to stop the invasion of Townsville by pickles from outer space.

=== Windows ===
- The Powerpuff Girls: Mojo Jojo's Clone Zone is a learning game published by The Learning Company, for ages 6+. In it, Mojo Jojo has created a bunch of robotic clones to take over Townsville and the Powerpuff Girls must get the clones' motherboards to earn various prizes and infiltrate his lair to defeat the clones.
- The Powerpuff Girls: Gamesville was developed by BAM! Entertainment for the PC-CD-ROM. It was released on October 31, 2002.
- The Powerpuff Girls: Princess Snorebucks is a game made by The Learning Company. In it, the Powerpuff Girls are under a sleeping spell from Princess Morebucks' music box and they must get notes from the music box to earn various prizes and destroy the music box so they can wake up.
- The Powerpuff Girls: Mojo Jojo's Pet Project is an adventure game published by BAM! Entertainment. In the game, the controller plays the three girls (Blossom, Bubbles, and Buttercup), as well as their new supercomputer in an array of arcade-style games to save Townsville from mutated animals.
- The Powerpuff Girls: Defenders of Townsville is an action adventure game by Cartoon Network Games and Radian Games. It is based on the CGI designs from the 2014 special Dance Pantsed, but can also be played with the classic designs from the original series.

=== Other appearances ===
- Cartoon Network: Punch Time Explosion/XL is a game developed by CRAVE Games. It was released in North America on June 2, 2011, for the Nintendo 3DS and on November 15, 2011, for the Xbox 360, Wii, and PlayStation 3 consoles as Punch Time Explosion XL. It features all three kids, Mojo, and Him as playable characters, Fuzzy Lumpkins as an assist character, The Rowdyruff Boys as the girls' alternate costumes, and the show as a stage.
- Cartoon Network Racing is a game created by Cartoon Network Interactive, Eutechnyx, Firebrand Games and The Game Factory. It was released in North America on December 4, 2006, for the PlayStation 2 and Nintendo DS. It features all three girls (As one character in the PS2, separated in the DS version), Mojo, HIM, Fuzzy Lumpkins (exclusive to the PS2 version) and Professor Utonium as playable characters.
- Cartoon Network Universe: FusionFall was a massively multiplayer online game developed by Cartoon Network and Grigon Entertainment. FusionFall used the Unity engine as its client technology basis. It featured all three girls, Mojo, HIM, Fuzzy Lumpkins, Princess Morbucks, Ace, the Mayor, and Professor Utonium as non-playable characters (NPCs). Released on January 14, 2009, its servers were shut down on August 29, 2013.
- Lego Dimensions is a toys-to-life video game developed by Traveller's Tales. It was released in North America on September 27, 2015, for the PlayStation 3, PlayStation 4, Xbox 360, Xbox One, and Wii U. A pair of Lego packs for the game, themed after the 2016 reboot, were released on September 12, 2017. These include a Team Pack, containing Blossom and Bubbles minifigures and constructible Octi and PPG Smartphone items; and a Fun Pack, containing a Buttercup minifigure and a constructible Mega Blast Bot. The packs add a new Powerpuff Girls-themed open-world area and battle arenas to the game.
- MultiVersus is a platform fighting game featuring Warner Bros. Discovery-associated characters developed by Player First Games. The game launched on May 28, 2024, on PlayStation 4, PlayStation 5, Xbox One, Xbox Series X/S, and PC, following an open beta lasting from July 26, 2022, to June 25, 2023. The City of Townsville was added as a playable stage at launch, featuring Mojo Jojo in a flying saucer acting as both a platform and a stage hazard. The Powerpuff Girls themselves were added as a single playable character on September 17, 2024, as part of the game's third season. The Rowdyruff Boys were also included in the game, who are an alternative unlockable variant of the Powerpuff Girls.
- Cookie Run: OvenBreak held a collaboration event running between November 2025 and December 2025 that featured cookie versions of the original 1998 incarnations of Blossom, Bubbles, and Buttercup as limited-time obtainable characters. The event focuses on a story in which the Girls and the Professor learn of the Cookie World and travel there, only for Mojo Jojo to sneak along and turn them into cookies, leading them to find a way to return to their normal forms with the help of Aloe Cookie, while trying to thwart another plan by Mojo Jojo. While Octi appears as a pet for Bubbles, Bullet and Beebo, originally one-shot characters, appear as pets for Blossom and Buttercup respectively.

== Reception ==
Bad Mojo Jojo was a failure critically. IGN gave the game a 5.0, and wrote that, "It really boils down to a game where you fly around and collect icons thrown in different parts of the levels." GameSpot rated the game a 3.2 ("bad" rating), and reported, "Even younger players will find the game to be little more than an exercise in frustration."

Paint the Townsville Green earned mixed reviews. GameSpot gave the game a 5.7 out of 10.

Battle Him earned mixed reviews with a score of 5 out of 10 from GameSpot.

Relish Rampage received mixed reviews. Metacritic gave the game a 46 out of 100 based on 5 reviews for the PS2 version and, for the GameCube version, giving it a score of 51 out of 100 based on 3 reviews.

Mojo Jojo-A-Go-Go received mixed reviews. Metacritic gave the game a 60 out of 100 based on 11 reviews. GameSpot gave the game a 6.3 saying; "While the game can't be recommended as highly as the incredible cartoon it's based on, Powerpuff Girls: Mojo-Jojo A-Go-Go is a capable shooter in its own right."

HIM and Seek received positive reviews. IGN gave it a 7.5 rating score and even stated in a review that it was described as sort of like a (kiddie-style Final Fight) type of game but better than the former.

Chemical X-traction received negative reviews. IGN gave the PS1 version a 2.0 out of 10 overall, criticizing the gameplay stating it was weak and the graphics saying "The goggles do nothing!" while though they praised the presentation and the sound of the game but also criticized the N64 version for the lack of cutscenes and passwords in favor of the PS1 that had a save feature.

== See also ==
- List of Cartoon Network video games
