= Chocolate Surpresa =

Chocolate brand

The Chocolate Surpresa was a brand of chocolate made by Nestlé in Brazil. It was introduced on 1983 and was popular in the 1980s and the early 1990s, but its popularity declined and it ceased to be produced in the year of 2003.

The chocolate itself was a common black milky bar, flat and thin. But what really made it achieve so much success was that each of them would come with a figure made on a thin cardboard paper with a picture of an animal on it.

== The Albums ==
Nestlé, understanding the potential of the pictures, started making themed albums where the pictures would be glued. To obtain the albums, kids in Brazil would buy three or four bars of Chocolate Surpresa and send the packaging in a letter to Nestlé. A few days later the album would arrive at home.

Each year, a new album would be available with a different theme, such as "Animals from Amazon", "Sea Wonders", etc.. And of course the pictures on the chocolate would change too. The Chocolate Surpresa "album fever" was so big, that many kids would buy the chocolate only for the picture, and many times discard the chocolate itself or keep it for later.

The albums would include a page for each animal, with the space to glue the picture and also many infos on that particular animal, including popular name, scientific name, natural habitat, etc.

Album	Year
Animais de Todo o Mundo (Animals from Around the World)	1983
Animais do Pantanal (Animals from Pantanal)	1984
Maravilhas do Mar (Sea Wonders)	1985
Animais da Amazônia (Animals from the Amazon)	1986
A Fantástica Mata Atlântica (The Fantastic Mata Atlantica)	1987
Litoral e Ilhas Oceânicas (The Litoral and Oceanic Islands)	1988
Campos e Cerrados (Fields and Shrublands)	1989
Sertões (Backwoods)	1991
Cães de Raça (Dog Breeds)	1992
Dinossauros (Dinosaurs)	1993
Viagem Surpresa ao Fundo do Mar (Surprise Trip to the Bottom of the Sea)	1995
Viagem Espacial (Space Trip)	1997
Shows da Natureza (Nature Shows)	1998
Guia dos Curiosos (Curious' Guide)	2001
Scooby-Doo	2002
The Powerpuff Girls	2003
Mix Cartoon	2003

Chocolate Surpresa is nowadays a cult icon of Brazilian's 1980s and remembered with nostalgia by people that grew up in that decade.
