= Teslo =

Teslo can refer to:

- Teslo, a character from the Mixels franchise
- Terje Teslo, the mayor of Eidsvoll, a community in Norway
