= Grownup =

A grownup is an adult.

Grownup may also refer to:

- Grown-Ups, a 1980 British BBC television film
- Grown Ups (1997 TV series), a British sitcom
- Grown Ups (1999 TV series), an American sitcom
- Grownups (2006 TV series), a British sitcom
- Grown Up (film), a 1993 short animated film by Joanna Priestley
- Grown Ups (film), a 2010 American comedy film
  - Grown Ups 2, the sequel film
- "The Grown-Ups" (Mad Men) a 2009 episode of the television show
- Grown Ups (band), a pop punk band from Chicago
- Grown Up (album), a 2010 album by By2
- Grown-Up (EP), a 2012 EP by F.T. Island
- "Grown Up", a 2012 single by Danny Brown
- "Grown Up", a 2016 single by Monni
- "Grown Ups", a 2025 song by Pulp, from the album More
