= Lego The Powerpuff Girls =

Lego theme

- Subject: The Powerpuff Girls
- Licensed from: Cartoon Network
- Availability: 2018–2019
- Total sets: 2
- Characters: Blossom, Bubbles, Buttercup, Donny the Unicorn, Mojo Jojo, Octi, and Princess Morbucks
- Official website

Lego The Powerpuff Girls is a discontinued Lego theme based on the Cartoon Network television series of the same name created by Craig McCracken. It was licensed from Cartoon Network. Before the launch of the Lego The Powerpuff Girls theme, two packs were released for the Lego Dimensions toys-to-life video game in 2017. The theme was introduced in August 2018 and was discontinued by the end of 2019.

== Overview ==
Lego The Powerpuff Girls was based on The Powerpuff Girls television show. The product line focuses on The Powerpuff Girls features Blossom, Bubbles, and Buttercup, three superheroes whose purpose is to reduce crime in between living a normal childhood. The theme aimed to recreate the main characters in Lego form, including Princess Morbucks, Octi, Donny the Unicorn, Mojo Jojo, Blossom, Bubbles, and Buttercup.

== Development ==
Prior to the theme's official launch, The Powerpuff Girls was included in the Lego crossover video game, Lego Dimensions, with two packs being released in 2017. The Lego theme was inspired by 2016 TV series The Powerpuff Girls. The Lego construction toy range was based on the TV series and developed in collaboration with Cartoon Network Enterprises. The construction sets were designed to recreate the story and characters of the TV series in Lego form.

== Launch ==
Following the released of the two packs for the Lego Dimensions toys-to-life video game in 2017. Lego The Powerpuff Girls theme was launched at the New York Toy Fair in 2018 with only two toy sets after the Lego Dimensions video game was released. As part of the marketing campaign, The Lego Group released two toy sets based on the television show. Each set featured different mech suit, playground, buildings and vehicles. Minifigures were released as well, including Princess Morbucks, Octi, Donny the Unicorn, Mojo Jojo, Blossom, Bubbles, and Buttercup.

== Characters ==
- Blossom: She is the leader of the Powerpuff Girls. She loves organization and hates when things are messy and out of order. She has a perfect attendance record and is an overachiever.
- Bubbles: She is the sweetest of the team. Bubbles is an animal lover and usually tries to save the day the nice way. She can be a bit naive but can also get angered very easily. When she is in bed, she has Octi by her side for good.
- Buttercup: She is the toughest yet goofiest of the team. Buttercup is a tomboy who loves to get into action and likes to play sports, hanging out with boys and having fun. She has a fear of spiders and she has a temper that can usually get out of control. Her trail is green with little triangles.
- Octi: He is Bubbles' cute and cuddly purple stuffed octopus.
- Donny the Unicorn: He is a young unicorn who is best friends with Bubbles.
- Mojo Jojo: He is considered the arch-enemy of the Powerpuff Girls. He was originally the Professor's lab assistant and his main goal is none other than to destroy the Powerpuff Girls.
- Princess Morbucks: She is one of the enemies of the Powerpuff Girls. Princess comes from a rich family and uses money to get her way. She attends the same school as the girls. This version of Princess has a more mature personality than her original counterpart does and has a habit of flaunting her wealth, but still retains her rivalry with Blossom.

== Construction sets ==
According to BrickLink, The Lego Group released a total of 2 Lego sets as part of the Lego The Powerpuff Girls theme. It was discontinued by the end of 2019.

In 2018, The Lego Group announced a partnership with Cartoon Network to create a licensing and merchandising programme based on The Powerpuff Girls television series, which was released on 24 August 2018. The partnership included the release of 2 sets based on The Powerpuff Girls. The two toy sets released included Bubbles Playground Showdown (set number: 41287) and Mojo Jojo Strikes (set number: 41288). The sets were designed primarily for children aged 6 to 12 years old.

=== Bubbles Playground Showdown ===
Bubbles Playground Showdown (set number: 41287) was released on 24 August 2018. The set consists of 144 pieces with 3 minifigures. Princess Morbucks' mech suit included removable power gloves and 2 stud shooters. The playground included a slide with ladder, spinning merry-go-round, a lunch bench with catapult and lockers. It also included Bubbles' aura power shooters, Princess Morbucks' power gloves and variety of accessories. Bubbles’ aura power shooters can launch at Princess Morbucks. The mech suit's stud shooters can launch studs at Bubbles. The set included Lego minifigures of Princess Morbucks, Octi and Bubbles.

=== Mojo Jojo Strikes ===
Mojo Jojo Strikes (set number: 41288) was released on 24 August 2018. The set consists of 228 pieces with 4 minifigures. Mojo Jojo's getaway car included an aimable stud shooter. An ice cream stand included a counter and ice cream launcher. A jewelry store included an opening door, rotating camera and a wall. It also included variety of accessories. The set included Lego minifigures of Mojo Jojo, Blossom and Buttercup along with Donny the Unicorn buildable figure.

== Video game ==
A pair of The Powerpuff Girls-themed packs for the toys-to-life video game Lego Dimensions were released on September 12, 2017. These include a Team Pack, containing playable Blossom and Bubbles figures and constructable Octi and PPG Smartphone items; and a Fun Pack, containing a playable Buttercup figure and a constructable Mega Blast Bot. The packs add a new The Powerpuff Girls-themed open-world area and battle arenas to the game. Also, there was a crossover exclusive Teen Titans Go! episode for Lego Dimensions that included The Powerpuff Girls fighting the Gremlins in Jump City.

== See also ==
- Lego Mixels
- Lego Unikitty!
- Lego Dimensions
- Lego Scooby-Doo
- Lego DC Super Hero Girls
- Lego Super Heroes
- Lego Ben 10: Alien Force
