= Grown Up (film) =

- Directed by: Joanna Priestley
- Written by: Joanna Priestley; Barbara Carnegie
- Produced by: Joanna Priestley
- Cinematography: Joanna Priestley
- Edited by: Joanna Priestley
- Music by: Steve Christopherson; Warren Rand
- Production company: Priestley Motion Pictures
- Distributed by: Microcinema International (2006)
- Release date: 1993
- Running time: 7 minutes
- Country: United States
- Language: English

Grown Up is a 1993 7 minute 16mm short animated film by Joanna Priestley, using drawings on paper, pixellated hands and object animation. The film was written by Barbara Carnegie and Joanna Priestley, and directed, produced, and animated by Priestley.

== Synopsis ==
Grown Up takes a humorous look at what it means to be turning 40 and growing older.

== Release ==
The film was re-released on DVD in 2006 by Microcinema International. It was screened in a retrospective of Priestley's works in April 2009.

== Awards and recognition ==
- First Prize, Marin County Film Festival
- First Prize, Worldfest Houston
- Gold Award, Black Maria Film and Video Festival
- Directorâs Citation Award, Worldfest Charleston
- Gold Award, Columbus International Film Festival
- Honorable Mention, Intercom International Festival
- Certificates of Merit:
  - Athens International Film and Video Festival
  - Ottawa International Animation Festival
  - USA Film Festival
  - Stuttgart Animation Festival
  - San Francisco International Film Festival
  - Sinking Creek Film Festival.

Selected Festivals: New York Film Festival, Telluride Film Festival, Northwest Film and Video Festival:
