= Transformers Animated: The Game =

2008 video game

- North American box art
- Developer: Artificial Mind and Movement
- Publisher: Activision
- Platform: Nintendo DS
- Release: NA: October 21, 2008; EU: October 24, 2008; AU: November 26, 2008
- Genre: Action
- Mode: Single-player

Transformers Animated: The Game is a 2008 video game for the Nintendo DS handheld based on Transformers: Animated, a television series in the Transformers franchise.

== Plot ==
The story is centered on the rogue factory robots and Space Bridge episodes that can be found in the animated series. The first half would have the player fighting the rogue security bots running amok in the Sumdac factories while the second half would have the Autobots follow Megatron through the Space Bridge and into Cybertron. The voice actors in the animated series also lent their voices to the characters in the video game.

== Gameplay ==
Gameplay

While this game features three-dimensional characters and environments, it mostly plays on a two-dimensional plane where the characters move from left to right or up and down. Unlike other games based on the Transformers franchise, this one is mainly a puzzle game.

There are 25 levels in total that can be found in the game, and it has two main modes: race mode and mission mode. In race mode, the player can use either Bumblebee, Optimus Prime or Prowl to race against the enemies or transform to robot mode in order to throw projectiles into an enemy to destroy them.

=== Mission mode ===
There are the standard four Autobots that the player can use: Optimus Prime, Bulkhead, Prowl and Bumblebee. The player will guide them through several different stages while solving puzzles along the way. Each Autobot has a special skill that is only unique to them. Optimus Prime can use his axe to throw at his enemies and can use his grappling hook to climb the red steel girders scattered around the game. Bumblebee has his stingers that shoots electric bolts against enemies as well charge up generators to activate certain devices. He is also the only one among them that can jump and scale walls on his own. Bulkhead has his wrecking ball that he uses to throw against enemies and, being the heaviest of the three, is the only one heavy enough to step onto platform switches that open doors and turn on other devices. Using their own unique skills to solve the different puzzle rooms is the core gameplay, which is similar to The Lost Vikings. There are boss fights in this game where the player is sent to stop Lockdown and Megatron. Stopping Megatron however involves a bit of puzzle solving as well wherein the player needs to utilize all three Autobots to defeat him.

=== Playable characters ===
For the most part, the Autobots Optimus Prime, Bumblebee, Bulkhead, and Prowl are fully playable.

== Reception ==
Reception

Aggregate score
Aggregator	Score
Metacritic	69/100

Review scores
Publication	Score
GameSpot	6.5/10
GamesRadar+	3/5
GameZone	7.1/10
IGN	7.4/10
Jeuxvideo.com	12/20
Nintendo Power	7/10
PALGN	6/10
Pocket Gamer	3/5

The game received "average" reviews according to the review aggregation website Metacritic.
