= The Powerpuff Girls (Sennari Interactive games) =

2000 video game

The Powerpuff Girls games are a series of three 2D platform game developed by Los Angeles-based studio Sennari Interactive and published by BAM! Entertainment for the Game Boy Color. They are based on The Powerpuff Girls animated series on Cartoon Network. The series includes The Powerpuff Girls: Bad Mojo Jojo, The Powerpuff Girls: Paint the Townsville Green, and The Powerpuff Girls: Battle Him. Players can trade character cards across versions when linked together with the Game Boy Color's Game Link Cable accessory.

== The Powerpuff Girls: Bad Mojo Jojo ==
The Powerpuff Girls: Bad Mojo Jojo
- Developer: Sennari Interactive
- Publisher: Bay Area Multimedia
- Series: The Powerpuff Girls
- Platform: Game Boy Color
- Release: NA: November 21, 2000
- Genre: Platform
- Mode: Single player

The Powerpuff Girls: Bad Mojo Jojo follows Blossom, the leader of the Powerpuff Girls, as she fights Mojo Jojo and his henchmen. Blossom can fly, but only for a short period of time. GameSpot cites this as a key problem, as whenever Blossom falls into water, she not only dies, but any progress in collecting required trinkets throughout the level is reset to nothing.

The game was a failure critically. IGN gave the game a 5.0, and wrote that, "It really boils down to a game where you fly around and collect icons thrown in different parts of the levels." GameSpot rated the game a 3.2 ("bad" rating), and reported, "Even younger players will find the game to be little more than an exercise in frustration."

== The Powerpuff Girls: Paint the Townsville Green ==
The Powerpuff Girls: Paint the Townsville Green
- Developer: Sennari Interactive
- Publisher: Bay Area Multimedia
- Series: The Powerpuff Girls
- Platform: Game Boy Color
- Release: NA: November 30, 2000
- Genre: Platformer
- Mode: Single player

The Powerpuff Girls: Paint the Townsville Green is the second installment in the trilogy. It follows Buttercup battling the Gangreen Gang. The game plays very similar to the first one, with Buttercup controlling identically to Blossom. The game re-uses the same five level-environments and soundtrack from Bad Mojo Jojo as well.

Similarly to Bad Mojo Jojo, the game was a failure critically. DailyRadar gave the title a 50 out of 100 score, and German review outlet 64Power giving the game a 40 out of 100.

== The Powerpuff Girls: Battle Him ==
The Powerpuff Girls: Battle Him
- Developer: Sennari Interactive
- Publisher: BAM! Entertainment
- Series: The Powerpuff Girls
- Platform: Game Boy Color
- Release: February 23, 2001
- Genre: Shooter

The Powerpuff Girls: Battle Him is the 2001 video game. In the game, players take control of Bubbles, the sweet and gentle member of the Powerpuff Girls, as she embarks on a solo mission to rescue the citizens of Townsville from the clutches of the villainous HIM.

The game unfolds across multiple side-scrolling platform shooter stages, where Bubbles must fly, punch, kick, and shoot her way through various enemies. To aid her quest, Bubbles can collect power-ups that enhance her flying abilities and unlock special attacks. One such attack is the Sonic Scream, which temporarily stuns enemies and is replenished by collecting Black Chemical X bottles. She can also summon her fellow Powerpuff Girls using color-coded hotlines found throughout the levels. Players can gather a variety of collectibles, including: Sugars and spices for extra continues; Keys to unlock doors; Candy hearts to boost health; Trading cards (12 unique ones per game) that can be saved, viewed, and exchanged via the Game Link accessory. The game features battery-backed memory, allowing automatic saving after each completed goal.

Reception

Review score
| Publication | Score |
|---|---|
| Total Game Boy | 80% |

Total Game Boy rated the game 80 out of 100, calling its connectivity with the other Powerpuff Girls Game Boy titles "a real value for money" but criticizing its "aimless" gameplay, "ultra annoying" sound effects, and "extremely small and hard to control" character sprites. The Atlanta Constitution said, "Young girls looking for a game to call their own should take a ride with this stylish title for the Game Boy Color".
