= Mixels =

American-Danish animated television series

- Also known as: Monsters
- Genre: Comedy; Fantasy
- Created by: John Fang; David P. Smith
- Story by: David P. Smith; John Fang; Jordan Reicheck
- Directed by: John Fang; Jordan Reicheck
- Creative director: David P. Smith
- Composers: Kevin Manthei; Kiara Geller
- Countries of origin: Denmark; United States
- Original language: English
- No. of seasons: 2
- No. of episodes: 26

Production
- Executive producers: Brian A. Miller; Jennifer Pelphrey; Tramm Wigzell; Rob Sorcher
- Producers: Pernelle Hayes; Donna Smith
- Editors: Rob Getzschman; Tony Tedford
- Running time: 30 seconds–3 minutes (shorts); 5–9 minutes (minisodes); 21–22 minutes (specials)
- Production companies: The LEGO Group (uncredited); Cartoon Network Studios

Original release
- Network: Cartoon Network
- Release: February 12, 2014 – October 1, 2016

Mixels is an animated television series that aired on Cartoon Network and was produced by The LEGO Group and Cartoon Network Studios. Following colorful creatures known as Mixels, the series depicts their exploits involving their ability to combine with one another in order to solve problems or fight against their enemy: the Nixels. The series first aired on February 12, 2014, with a new episode of Teen Titans Go! (it began airing as an interstitial program on Boomerang on February 19), and ran for a total of two seasons and 26 episodes; it wrapped production in July 2016, and concluded with an airing of the series finale, "Nixel, Nixel, Go Away", on October 1, 2016.

Although previous Lego series, such as Lego Ninjago and Lego Legends of Chima, use CGI animation and were acquired by Cartoon Network, Mixels made use of Toon Boom Harmony software, animated at Atomic Cartoons, Inc., before later being animated traditionally at Digital eMation, Inc., Big Star Entertainment, Inc., and Saerom Animation, Inc. and is a Cartoon Network original. A mobile app was released for the series on March 4, 2014, named Calling All Mixels, and even earlier two websites, one on the LEGO website and another owned by Cartoon Network, were launched where fans can learn about the Mixels. Nine series of collectible Lego building toys were also released, based on the characters.

== Premise ==
Mixels is set in a fictional planet known as Planet Mixel, where the eponymous creatures live and engage in adventures across diverse lands. Mixels are split into twenty-four tribes based on fantasy elements or city occupations and have individual powers and traits based on these tribes. These creatures are capable of combining with one another to create temporary fusions known as a Mix (combinations of any Mixels), a Max (combinations of three Mixels from one tribe representing their element), or a Murp (uncontrollable combination of any Mixels), using an item known as a Cubit. Opposing the Mixels are the Nixels, led by figures Major Nixel and his boss, King Nixel, who live to tear apart the Mixels, get rid of the Cubits and hate color.

The series' first season follows different Mixels' escapades and differing points of view on how to solve certain problems, always resulting in a Mix. In the second season, the world is expanded as Mixels are revealed to be living on the moon. The city of Mixopolis is introduced: a metropolis housing new Mixel tribes and settings.

== Episodes ==
=== Series overview ===
Season	Episodes	Originally released	
Season	Episodes	First released	Last released
1	22	February 12, 2014	August 31, 2014
2	4	March 9, 2015	October 1, 2016

=== Season 1 (2014) ===
No. overall	No. in season	Title	Written and storyboarded by	Original release date	Prod. code
1	1	"Coconapple"	Unknown	February 12, 2014	501-296-01A
Seismo and Zorch try to get a coconapple (combination of "coconut" and "apple") hanging from a tree.
2	2	"Hot Lava Shower"	Unknown	February 12, 2014	501-296-02F
Vulk gets the Infernites to fix the Lava Shower, and they Max to unclog the pipes, but they heat a toilet and water fountain, resulting in burning Teslo's mouth and Krader's rear.
3	3	"Cookironi"	Unknown	February 12, 2014	501-296-02B
Nine first-wave Mixels fight over their last cookironi (combination of "cookie" and "macaroni").
4	4	"Electrock"	Unknown	February 19, 2014	501-296-01D
The Cragsters have a digging contest, but Krader digs too far into the Electroid kingdom. The other Cragsters find him, and they end up dancing in an Electrock (mix between electric and rock) dance party, Max and have another contest.
5	5	"Nixels"	Unknown	February 26, 2014	501-296-01E
Flain and Seismo want to have fun on the lava slide, but some Nixels try to nix their fun. Therefore, they fight off the Nixels by mixing.
6	6	"Murp"	Unknown	March 5, 2014	501-296-01C
Flain and Krader try to cross a river to get to the Fun-Fun Barbecue Party Teslo calls super-fun, but they Murp. They finally mix, but the party turns super-lame.
7	7	"Pothole"	Unknown	March 5, 2014	501-296-02A
Zaptor and Vulk mix to get rid of a pothole on the road, but destroy everything nearby.
8	8	"Mailman"	Unknown	March 12, 2014	501-296-02E
When his ceramic Teddy Butterfly does not arrive on time, Shuff teams up with the other Cragsters to catch a speedy mailman, Zorch.
9	9	"Another Nixel"	Unknown	March 19, 2014	501-296-02D
Major Nixel tells the Nixels to bring him cubits.
10	10	"Changing a Light Bulb"	Unknown	May 5, 2014	501-296-01B
During a lesson, the Electroids make a Max to change a lightbulb when the old one goes out.
11	11	"Rockball"	Unknown	May 5, 2014	501-296-02C
Krader and the Cragsters challenge Flain and the Infernites to a game of Rockball.
12	12	"Wrong Colors"	Unknown	May 21, 2014	501-296-03A
Volectro and Shuff get chased by hundreds of Nixels, but the only cubit that they have has the wrong colors, so it is up to Flurr and Gobba to save them.
13	13	"Mix Over" "Nixel 'Mix Over'"	Unknown	May 28, 2014	501-296-03F
Major Nixel tells the Nixels to steal cubits from Balk and Lunk by painting them like Mixels, but thinks they are actual Mixels and attacks them.
14	14	"Bar B Cubes"	Unknown	May 28, 2014	501-296-03B
Vulk and Slumbo mix and open a Bar-B-Cube stand, while Krader and Volectro mix and open a Rock-Pop (parody of Pop Rocks) stand. Both try to get Gobba to buy their snacks with free samples as Gobba only has one muck.
15	15	"Snow Half Pipe"	Unknown	June 5, 2014	501-296-04C
Flain, Krader, Jawg, Kraw, Slumbo, and Flurr do tricks and mix on an ice half-pipe (save for Flain and Krader, who make a Murp).
16	16	"Hamlogna Conveyorbelt"	Unknown	June 5, 2014	501-296-03G
Zaptor wants more Hamlogna sandwiches, so he makes the conveyor belt go too fast for Lunk and Tentro, who then mix to help, but Jawg eventually eats all the Hamlogna sandwiches.
17	17	"Vaudeville Fun"	Unknown	June 12, 2014	501-296-04B
Kraw and Gobba mix to make an audition judged by Vulk, Slumbo, and Volectro. Nothing goes well, though.
18	18	"Fang Gang Log Toss"	Unknown	June 19, 2014	501-296-04A
Chomly and Jawg are playing Log Toss, despite Slumbo and Flain's protests. Therefore, they make them into a log-shaped Murp and play Mixel Toss with the Murp.
19	19	"High Five"	Unknown	June 19, 2014	501-296-03E
Slumbo and Kraw mix to give Chomly high-fives. When they run out of Cubits, Chomly grabs his, but they make a Murp, hurting Chomly.
20	20	"Elevator"	Unknown	June 26, 2014	501-296-03C
Lunk has to quickly get to Balk's birthday party. However, he is too slow to reach the elevator. Therefore, he mixes with Tentro to make it in time.
21	21	"The Biggest and Most Epic Mixels Minisode Ever" "Epic Comedy Adventure"	David P. Smith, John Fang, and Dominic Bisignano	August 31, 2014	701-???-200
Major Nixel attempts to ruin the Mixels' annual event the Mixfest, so the first two series tribal leaders must stop him and his Nixel army to save Mixel Land.
22	22	"Murp Romp" "Murp Rump"	David P. Smith, John Fang, and Dominic Bisignano	August 31, 2014	701-???-200
Scorpi and Glurt accidentally Mix into a horrible Murp that goes loose and starts to destroy everything, so Glomp, Torts, Footi, and Hoogi must stop him from sliming and slicing everything up before it is too late.

=== Season 2 (2015–16) ===
No. overall	No. in season	Title	Written and storyboarded by	Original release date	Prod. code
23	1	"Moon Madness (Note: This special was divided into six shorts: "Only You Can Prevent Forest Freezes, Only You!", "Houston, We Have a Problem!", "Crater Tots!", "Things That Go Murp in the Night!", "Don't Pull the Gravity Plug!", and "Tall Tales From Da Moon!")"	Michael Diederich, Douglas McCarthy, and John Fang; Miranda Dressler (additional storyboarder)	March 9, 2015	701-???-400
The Infernite Cousins go on a camping trip as Flamzer tells a campfire story about an alien abduction, revealing new Mixels on the Mixel Moon, as well as new ones on the dark side.
24	2	"Quest for the Lost Mixamajig"	Michael Diederich and Skip Jones	September 26, 2015	701-029-600
A group of Mixels set out on a quest for the mythical Mixamajig without knowing that it is part of King Nixel's plot to capture them. Note: This episode isn't available on YouTube by Lego.
25	3	"Every Knight Has Its Day"	Michael Diederich, Skip Jones, and Steven Banks	March 5, 2016	701-030-700
Camillot and Mixadel go to Mixopolis Middle School to learn how to mix with the "common" Mixels.
26	4	"Nixel, Nixel, Go Away"	Michael Diederich, Skip Jones, and Steven Banks	October 1, 2016	701-???-900
Booger must stop King Nixel from replacing Cubits with "I-Cubits" and taking over Mixopolis. Note: This episode isn't available on YouTube by Lego.

== Merchandise ==
=== Lego Mixels ===
Lego Mixels
- Three of the sets from Series 1 (from left to right: Flain, Volectro, and Seismo).
- Subject: Combining
- Availability: 2014–2016
- Total sets: 90
- Official website

Lego Mixels (stylized as LEGO Mixels) was a Lego theme based on a variety of tribes living in a fantastical diverse world and are small creatures that can mix and combine with one another to create new characters. The theme was first introduced in 2014. It was eventually discontinued by the end of 2016.

==== Overview ====
The Lego Group handles all toy merchandise for the Mixels franchise, and Cartoon Network handles all non-toy merchandising. The Lego Mixels buildable collectible figurines went on sale on March 1, 2014. Each character has their own set, and nine were released as part of series one. For each tribe, one of the three sets contains a Nixel. Series 2 was released at the end of May, and Series 3 was released at the end of August. Series 4 was released on February 1, 2015.

==== Development ====
Before Cartoon Network came to Lego, Mixels was called Monsters. It had sets of five in a tribe with overly simple designs. Some design changes include Shuff and Seismo's names being swapped with each other, Shuff having a looser crystal on his head that would have looked more like hair, Vulk's ears being red instead of black, the Nixels coming in various shapes, and Balk originally being shorter and squatter with thinner tentacles and smaller pupils. Kraw was originally named Bouncer, Gobba was Chippo, and Tentro was Flexi; other sources still slip up on Tentro and call him Flexi, though, including the Lego Magazine once.

Lego designer Gemma Anderson explained the importance of the Max figure in designing each tribe's individual figures and stating that, "During the sketching phase, I would consider what the tribe theme is and then work out what the max could be, at the same time wondering how I can use certain parts from the Max in the 3 small Mixels. It's often a case of going back and forth between the 3 models and the Max." Anderson also highlighted the importance in the characters' faces in capturing a unique personality and explained, "The eyes and mouths are a huge part of the personality of the Mixel, changing the eyebrows for example can drastically change the expressions from sad to happy, or even angry! We would often brainstorm on the names of the character; some of them might be inside jokes with the team. One example is 'Tuth' in Series 8, it was a joke in the team that me being from Wales, I pronounce some words a little differently, such as 'tooth' sounding more like 'tuth'. We decided during the naming process, we would try to name that one Mixel how I pronounce it, and we succeeded."

==== Construction sets ====
According to BrickLink, The Lego Group released 90 playsets as part of the Lego Mixels theme. The product line was eventually discontinued by the end of 2016.

==== Discontinuation ====
Shortly after Cartoon Network announced that the episode "Nixel Nixel Go Away" will be the series finale, The Lego Group cancelled production of the toy line. As a result, the theme was discontinued.

== Controversy ==
On Lego's promotional website for the series, a Mixels building set released in 2015 for Turg was described as a "back-of-the-bus window-licker", which is considered a derogatory term in the United Kingdom. Following negative reception from British media outlets, an apology statement was issued by Lego, and the term was removed from the product's online description.

== Awards and nominations ==
In 2014, Mixels won the Pocket Money award at the London Toy Fair Best New Toy Awards.

== See also ==
- Lego Scooby-Doo
- Lego DC Super Hero Girls
- Lego The Powerpuff Girls
- Lego Unikitty!
- The Lego Movie
