= FusionFall =

2009 video game

- Developer: Grigon Entertainment
- Publisher: Cartoon Network
- Directors: Levon Hakobyan; Greg Grigon
- Producers: Cree Haas; Toe Bronson
- Designers: Levon Hakobyan; Chris Sunn; D. R. Watson; Jeremy Polk; Greg Grigon
- Writers: Levon Hakobyan; Erab Azraeu; Greg Grigon
- Composer: Seth Podowitz
- Engine: Unity
- Platforms: Microsoft Windows, Mac OS X
- Release: January 13, 2009
- Genres: Massively multiplayer online role-playing game, third-person shooter
- Mode: Multiplayer

Cartoon Network Universe: FusionFall was a massively multiplayer online game developed by Cartoon Network and South Korean studio Grigon Entertainment, released on January 13, 2009. The game took place within an amalgamation of Cartoon Network settings that included characters and locations from established shows as well as some unique additions, following a science fiction genre. FusionFall used the Unity engine as its client technology basis.

For the first year, the full game required a subscription; free accounts could only access a portion of the content. On August 29, 2013, the game's servers were shut down. It was unofficially revived by fans as two different games in 2017, the first being FusionFall: Retro (a revival of the original game) and the second being the unreleased FusionFall: Legacy (the original game plus additional content). On April 16, 2020, Cartoon Network issued a DMCA takedown notice to the developers of the games, resulting in Retro being removed entirely and Legacy being cancelled.

== Plot ==
Under the control of Lord Fuse, Planet Fusion travels through the universe devouring other planets, and Earth becomes its next target. Fusion Matter is dropped upon Earth, taking on a corrupted form of objects in the environment and becoming monsters. The player is enlisted into a force to thwart the enemies' plan and defeat them.

== Gameplay ==
In FusionFall, the player takes control of a customized human avatar. The game world features over 50 characters and several areas based on then-current and past shows on Cartoon Network. Some of these characters assist the player during their adventure. Uncommon in MMORPG's of its time was the platforming gameplay significantly present in FusionFall, with Community Director Rich Weil emphasizing the developers' intent to make the game "as three-dimensional as possible".

The player character is viewed from a third-person perspective with an overlaid HUD. By defeating enemies, players progress towards leveling up and receive currency, called taros, to buy clothing and weapon upgrades. There are two types of combat styles, ranged and melee, and the player can equip weapons for both and switch between them with a button press. A special feature present in FusionFall is the use of nanos, small versions of Cartoon Network characters, obtained by defeating an evil doppelgänger of the respective character. The mission to defeat the doppelgänger becomes available once the player obtains enough Fusion Matter, the game's experience point, and the player's level is dependent on how many nanos they have collected. Having the nano and assigning them as active grants a special ability of the player, chosen among three.

Four characters were available as a guide: Ben Tennyson (Ben 10), Dexter (Dexter's Laboratory), Edd (Ed, Edd n Eddy), and Mojo Jojo (The Powerpuff Girls). They gave rewards like equipment and items for completing certain missions.

Playing past level 5 originally required a monthly paid subscription in the form of redeemable cards that could be purchased at participating retailers. The cards were rendered obsolete after April 16, 2010, when the entirety of the game became free to play; players with unredeemed time cards were offered a refund for their unused cards. Since the game was designed for kids primarily, there were parental control options, giving parents the ability to monitor what their children were doing and restrict how much they could chat with other users.

New missions, NPCs, areas, and elements were periodically added to FusionFall from more recent shows. An area called the academy was also put into the game, where players made their characters and started playing. However, FusionFall's development was stopped so Cartoon Network could focus on other games such as Project Exonaut, Formula Cartoon, and FusionFall Heroes.

=== In-game events ===
On certain holidays, such as Thanksgiving or Christmas, FusionFall had small in-game celebrations that usually involved a special code for exclusive holiday items, scenery, and missions carried by special guest appearances of future cast members. Events for holidays stretched from two weeks to several months; some rolled directly from one to the other. The Holo Suit, an in-game outfit, would change its appearance, reflecting in-game events and the time of year.

== Development ==
After trying four years to have the project greenlit, development on FusionFall started in April 2006. Turner Entertainment wanted to take time to plan the business model carefully while searching for a developer at the same time. They settled on a Korean studio Grigon Entertainment, due to their art style and sense of humor. Some characters were aged up in order to please a wide range of the target audience. Unity was decided to be the engine running the game, as the team wanted for people to play even on low-end computers. To be easier for the younger players to access the game, it was made to be played in a web-browser.

A comic prequel, FusionFall: Worlds Collide, was co-written by Matthew Schwartz and Megas XLR co-creator George Krstic, and was distributed during the 2007 Comic Con. The comic was available on the official website to read and to download as a PDF. It covers the events leading up to the start of the game.

Four periods of open beta testing took place between November 14, 2008, and January 11, 2009, available to anyone with an account on Cartoon Network's website. All characters created after December 27, 2008, were carried onto the official release rather than being deleted.

== Release ==
At release, FusionFall required a paid subscription for the full game, with a limited portion of the content available for free. Free accounts could only play in the "future" portion of the game, which only allows players to collect four nanos and create two characters. The full game had a total of 56 nanos, 36 before the new updates. To create up to four characters, players had to earn all 36 nanos during the beta testing. Players with characters that progressed into the past during the sneak peek or during a previous subscription had their characters locked until a current subscription was purchased.

Subscription plans included one-month, three-month, year-long, and family plans. The FusionFall Victory Pack Exclusive was made available for purchase when the game was released. It contained a four-month subscription, as well as a game guide, T-shirt (if bought from GameStop), and exclusive outfits and weapons for the player's character through codes to enter on the game's website. The Victory Packs were eventually discontinued, having been replaced with one-month and three-month game card available for purchase at Target outlets.

The game was made completely free on April 19, 2010, making everything a member could have available for free.

== Reception ==
Reception

Aggregate score
Aggregator	Score
Metacritic	75/100

Review scores
Publication	Score
GameZone	7.2/10
IGN	7/10
Inside Mac Games	7.5/10
Macworld	3.5/5

Year	Organization	Award	Result	Ref.
2009	Webby Awards	Games	Nominated	

In the year of its release, FusionFall received coverage from such news outlets for technology and gaming as Ars Technica, IGN, Wired, Engadget, and the Unity engine blog among others.

== FusionFall Heroes ==
On March 25, 2013, about five months before the original game's shutdown, Cartoon Network released a new game called FusionFall Heroes. In this game, instead of playing a customized avatar, players would play different variants of established Cartoon Network characters. The game takes place concurrently with Fuse's attack on the Cartoon Network Universe in the original game. Playable characters include Finn the Human, Fionna the Human, and Marceline of Adventure Time, Dexter of Dexter's Laboratory, Mordecai and Rigby of Regular Show, Four Arms and Feedback of Ben 10, Gumball Watterson of The Amazing World of Gumball, Mojo Jojo of The Powerpuff Girls, and Johnny Bravo of his eponymous show. In the game, there are different costumes for the playable characters, as well as eggs that can unlock new costumes for different heroes.
