= The Powerpuff Girls: Chemical X-Traction =

2001 video game

- North American box art
- Developers: VIS Entertainment; Asylum Entertainment
- Publisher: BAM! Entertainment
- Directors: Stewart Waterson; Joe Booth
- Producers: Heidi Behrendt; Anne-Christine Gasc; Alison Wilson; David Mowbray
- Designers: Jay Rogers; Eric Nelson
- Programmer: Owain Green
- Artists: David Moss; Andrew North
- Composers: Thomas Chase; Steve Rucker; James L. Venable
- Series: The Powerpuff Girls
- Platforms: PlayStation, Nintendo 64
- Release: PlayStation: NA: November 14, 2001; PAL: December 7, 2001; Nintendo 64: NA: November 19, 2001
- Genre: Fighting
- Mode: Single player

The Powerpuff Girls: Chemical X-Traction is a fighting game published by BAM! Entertainment for the Nintendo 64 and PlayStation in 2001. It was based on the Cartoon Network animated series The Powerpuff Girls. The player controls one of the Powerpuff Girls in a variety of one-on-one melee battles against the computer-controlled villains.

== Gameplay ==
The Powerpuff Girls: Chemical X-Traction is a 3D fighting game in which the player controls one of the Powerpuff Girls (Blossom, Bubbles, and Buttercup), who must battle enemies in a variety of settings in order to reclaim Chemical X and track down Mojo Jojo. The player can choose from ten playable characters, which consist of The Powerpuff Girls and seven villains.

The game has two modes: story mode (the player can pick up objects and throw them at an enemy to decrease their opponent's health meter and use super-powered attacks by collecting vials of Chemical X) and simulator mode (the player controls a Powerpuff Girl against a villain or a villain against another villain).

== Plot ==
The Powerpuff Girls are baking a pie, to which Bubbles decides to add Chemical X as an ingredient. While the pie is cooling on the windowsill, Mojo Jojo steals it and shares it with Townsville's other villains, including Fuzzy Lumpkins, Big Billy, Ace, Sedusa and Princess Morbucks, empowering them all with Chemical X. Realizing the danger the villains now pose, the girls set out to track them down and beat the Chemical X out of their systems. The Powerpuff Girls eventually defeat Mojo and his allies, but are surprised by the sudden arrival of HIM, who intends to use the Chemical X for himself. The girls defeat HIM, driving him off. Bubbles proposes baking another pie, but Blossom and Buttercup quickly refuse.

== Reception ==
Reception

Aggregate scores
Aggregator	Score
GameRankings	(N64) 30% (PS) 39%
Metacritic	30/100

Review scores
Publication	Score
Game Informer	1.5/10
GameZone	7/10
IGN	2/10
Nintendo Power	1.5/5
Official U.S. PlayStation Magazine	1.5/5
X-Play	1/5

The PlayStation version received "generally unfavorable" reviews, according to the review aggregation website Metacritic.

Matt Helgeson of Game Informer gave the PS1 version a 1.5 out of 10, calling it "an arena fighter shallow enough to make Ooga Booga look like Final Fantasy Tactics. [...] There are some Shockwave browser games on the Powerpuff Girls website that are better than this, and they're free." Joe Rybicki of Official U.S. PlayStation Magazine gave the game a 1.5 out of 5, saying "it's all but impossible to land more than the occasional punch and kick before you get pummeled half to death. The game thus degenerates into pick up object, throw, repeat. Not exactly the most thrilling of experiences." Mark Fujita of IGN gave the PS1 version a 2 out of 10, saying that "if you like the Powerpuff Girls and you buy this game, you will be very disappointed."

A more positive review came from Suzi Sez of GameZone, who gave the PS1 version a 7 out of 10, saying it was "packed full of fast-paced and challenging action that plays out against a brightly colored cartoon backdrop." J.M. Vargas of PSX Nation was more mixed, giving the game a 70% and calling it "a more bearable and slightly-amusing rental for most (and a collector's item for fans of Craig McCracken's irreverent toon). A little pricey at $25-30, but worth checking."
