= Cartoon Network Racing =

2006 video game

- European PlayStation 2 version cover art
- Developers: Firebrand Games (NDS); Eutechnyx (PS2)
- Publisher: The Game Factory
- Engine: Octane (DS)
- Platforms: Nintendo DS; PlayStation 2
- Release: NA: December 4, 2006; EU: February 9, 2007
- Genre: Racing
- Modes: Single-player, multiplayer

Cartoon Network Racing is a racing video game developed by Eutechnyx for PlayStation 2 and Firebrand Games for Nintendo DS, published by Danish video game developer The Game Factory, and released on December 4, 2006, in North America, and on February 9, 2007, in Europe. The gameplay is similar to Nintendo's 2003 game Mario Kart: Double Dash, but the characters and racetracks are all from six of Cartoon Network's original animated television series: Courage the Cowardly Dog, Cow and Chicken, Dexter's Laboratory, I Am Weasel, Johnny Bravo, and The Powerpuff Girls.

== Gameplay ==
The player's character Courage the Cowardly Dog alongside their co-driver Johnny Bravo drives through the track Farmed and Dangerous with other characters from the channel.

There are two characters the player must choose: a driver, who drives a go-kart, and a co-driver, who uses all weapons and has two "toon powers". There are tournaments which players must race a series of races and win with the most points. Battle modes in arenas let two teams battle in different modes, and Cartoon Eliminators are endurance races where last kart in each lap is eliminated. The karts have three stats: acceleration, speed, and handling (if chosen as driver). If co-driver, they have two toon powers that fall into four categories: Shield, Attack, Boost and Flight.

All characters in the DS version are single-racers in separate karts. Each character's toon power can be used when their toon power bar is full. There are 1-8 players available in this version, and two bonus games can be unlocked.

A gallery in the PlayStation 2 version contains 12 unlockable cartoon episodes, two from each show. The first episode is unlocked by completing each cartoon-themed tournament while the other is unlocked by winning the super tournament with the driver of the series the player wants to unlock. The DS version features only three unlockable cartoons.

=== Characters ===
The Nintendo DS version features 20 playable characters, while 24 are included in the PlayStation 2 version.

- Courage the Cowardly Dog
  - Courage
  - Eustace Bagge
  - Muriel Bagge
- Cow and Chicken
  - Cow
  - Chicken
  - Earl (Note: Playable only in the PlayStation 2 version)
  - Flem
- Dexter's Laboratory
  - Dad
  - Dee Dee
  - Dexter
  - Mandark
  - Mom
- I Am Weasel
  - I.M. Weasel
  - I.R. Baboon
  - Red Guy
- Johnny Bravo
  - Johnny Bravo
  - Bunny Bravo
  - Suzy
  - Carl Chryniszzswics
- The Powerpuff Girls
  - Blossom (Note: The Powerpuff Girls appear as individual racers in the Nintendo DS version, but a single racer in the PlayStation 2 version.)
  - Bubbles
  - Buttercup
  - Fuzzy Lumpkins
  - Him
  - Mojo Jojo
  - Professor Utonium

== Reception ==
Reception

Aggregate score
Aggregator	Score	
Aggregator	DS	PS2
Metacritic	55/100	39/100

Review scores
Publication	Score	
Publication	DS	PS2
GameRevolution	N/A	D−
GameSpot	6.3/10	3.8/10
GameZone	6.5/10	5/10
IGN	5.8/10	3.4/10
NGamer	24%	N/A

The DS version received "mixed" reviews, while the PlayStation 2 version received "generally unfavorable reviews" according to video game review aggregator website Metacritic.

Lucas M. Thomas of IGN criticized the DS version for its similarities to the Mario Kart series, especially Mario Kart DS, as well as for having no characters from other Cartoon Network shows that were airing new episodes at the time. GameSpot's Aaron Thomas pointed out the same version's resemblance to Mario Kart, but he explained that a younger audience would find the game more enjoyable than an audience of serious gamers would.
