= The Powerpuff Girls: Relish Rampage =

2002 video game

- North American PlayStation 2 box art
- Developer: VIS Entertainment
- Publisher: BAM! Entertainment
- Series: The Powerpuff Girls
- Platforms: PlayStation 2, GameCube
- Release: PlayStation 2: NA: November 25, 2002; EU: December 13, 2002; GameCube: NA: December 15, 2002; EU: February 6, 2004
- Genre: Action-adventure
- Mode: Single-player

The Powerpuff Girls: Relish Rampage is an action-adventure video game developed by VIS Entertainment and published by BAM! Entertainment, based on the Cartoon Network animated series The Powerpuff Girls. It was released on PlayStation 2 and later on GameCube as a "Pickled Edition" with added gameplay.

== Gameplay ==
In the game, the player controls the Powerpuff Girls including Blossom, Bubbles, and Buttercup, and must fly around a 3D environment to solve puzzles in an attempt to stop the invasion of Townsville by Pickles from outer space.

== Plot ==
Mojo Jojo wants to win Townsville's election, and invents the "Radio Jojo" to persuade people into voting for him. Assisted by the Gangreen Gang, Mojo spreads airwaves that cause people to act like primates and support him. The Mayor informs the girls that Mojo has taken delivery vans containing the Mayor's votes and pickles. The Powerpuff Girls take it upon themselves to deliver the backup ballots and pickles to the voting booth. Across multiple levels, they defeat the Gangreen Gang and Princess Morbucks while helping the Professor restore the townspeople back to normal.

After finding and defeating Mojo Jojo, Blossom tells him that he lost the election because he "just can't beat a free pickle." Mojo then attempts to get free pickles with his radio, attracting the attention of the alien Pickloids, who invade Townsville. Mitch Mitchelson becomes their leader after eating one. The Powerpuff Girls protect the other students, save Mitch, and fight off the Pickloid invasion, as well as Mojo Jojo and Sedusa, who try to take advantage of the invasion. The Powerpuff Girls convince Mojo to help them and he builds a ray gun that destroys most of the Pickloids. The remaining Pickloids then kidnap the Mayor, the Professor, and other townsfolk, and the Powerpuff Girls confront their mothership to free them. The Pickloids give up on their invasion and try to invade another planet, but are devoured by an alien frog.

== Reception ==
IGN gave the game a 3.8 out of 10, calling it "a bad use of a good license" and criticizing the controls as "exceedingly flawed", the missions as "extremely repetitive", the boss fights as "boring", and the game's length as "exceedingly short". They praised the girls' designs and animations and how the city looks "pretty lively" but criticized the limited animation of the boss characters.

French magazine Consoles Plus gave it a 50%, calling the production value and gameplay "disastrous" and stating that the camera movements "quickly make you want to vomit."
