= List of The Powerpuff Girls characters =

Characters from animated series

The Powerpuff Girls is an American animated franchise that takes place in the fictional city of Townsville and stars the titular Powerpuff Girls — Blossom, Bubbles, and Buttercup — who appear in the original TV series, the anime adaptation and the 2016 reboot series.

Secondary characters include Professor Utonium, the Powerpuff Girls' creator and father figure; The Mayor, the kindhearted, but dimwitted mayor of Townsville, who often calls upon the Powerpuff Girls for help defending Townsville; Ms. Bellum, the mayor's secretary, who serves as a voice of reason; and Ms. Keane, the Powerpuff Girls' kindergarten teacher at Pokey Oaks. Primary villains include Mojo Jojo, an intelligent, megalomaniacal ape; Fuzzy Lumpkins, a Bigfoot-like hillbilly; HIM, a demonic being; Princess Morbucks, a wealthy, spoiled girl; the Gangreen Gang, a group of green-skinned hoodlums; Sedusa, a Gorgon-like seductress; the Amoeba Boys, a trio of dimwitted amoebas, and the Rowdyruff Boys, the Powerpuff Girls' evil male counterparts.

Series creator Craig McCracken originally conceived the Powerpuff Girls while attending the California Institute of the Arts in 1991, later expanding upon the premise in a short pilot called The Whoopass Girls in Whoopass Stew. After a name change and character redesigns, a new pilot, "The Powerpuff Girls: Meat Fuzzy Lumpkins", aired on Cartoon Network's World Premiere Toons animation showcase in 1995. High viewer approval ratings convinced the network to approve a full series, which aired from 1998 to 2005.

== Origin ==
In June 1991, Craig McCracken, then a student of the animation program of CalArts, created a drawing of three girls on a sheet of orange construction paper as a birthday card design for his brother. The following year, he made the characters protagonists of the short film Whoopass Stew! The Whoopass Girls in: A Sticky Situation. Though it was intended to be the first part of four Whoopass Girls shorts, only one short was produced. McCracken felt that he wanted to make a superhero student film, but that the muscular guy standard was already played out. After coming up with the concept, he started imagining them in superhero situations. McCracken's Whoopass Girls short was picked up for a series by Cartoon Network in 1993, with the Powerpuff Girls appearing in two What a Cartoon! shorts before receiving their own series.

== Main characters ==
=== The Powerpuff Girls ===
The Powerpuff Girls
- The Powerpuff Girls characters
- From top to bottom: Bubbles, Blossom and Buttercup as they appear in The Powerpuff Girls (2016)
- First appearance: "A Sticky Situation!" (1992 pilot); "Monkey See, Doggie Do" (1998); "Escape from Monster Island" (2016)
- Created by: Craig McCracken
- Voiced by: Whoopass Stew: Jennifer Fried; What a Cartoon!: Blossom: Cathy Cavadini; Bubbles: Kath Soucie; Buttercup: E. G. Daily; 1998 original: Blossom: Cathy Cavadini; Bubbles: Tara Strong; Buttercup: E. G. Daily; 2016 reboot: Blossom: Amanda Leighton; Bubbles: Kristen Li; Buttercup: Natalie Palamides

In-universe information
- Species: Artificial humans
- Gender: Females
- Occupation: Students; Superheroines
- Family: Professor Utonium (creator, father)
- Nationality: American

The Powerpuff Girls — Blossom (pink), Bubbles (light blue), and Buttercup (lime green) — are three 5 to 6-year-old girls who dedicate their lives to defending Townsville from the forces of evil while going to school and dealing with childhood problems. Their primary wardrobe consists of sleeveless dresses matching the color of their eyes, white stockings, and mary jane shoes. They have large eyes, inspired by Margaret Keane's art, with stubby arms and legs with no visible digits. McCracken preferred that they appear symbolic of actual girls rather than having a "realistic" look, meaning fewer body parts were needed.

As depicted in the opening sequence of each episode, they were created by scientist Professor Utonium in an attempt to create the "perfect little girl" using a mixture of "sugar, spice and everything nice". However, he accidentally spilled a mysterious substance called "Chemical X" into the mixture, creating three girls instead of one and granting them superpowers, including flight, superhuman physical abilities, x-ray vision, super senses, heat vision, and energy projection. In the original pilot, the substance was a can of "Whoopass".

==== Blossom ====
Blossom (voiced by Cathy Cavadini in What a Cartoon! and the 1998 original series, and Amanda Leighton in the 2016 reboot) is one of the three main protagonists and the self-proclaimed leader of the Powerpuff Girls; as the most level-headed and intelligent of the group, she also serves as strategist. She wears a large red bow on her head and has long orange hair in a ponytail (which also signifies her leadership). Her personality ingredient is "everything nice" and her signature color is pink. As shown in The Powerpuff Girls Movie, she was named for having spoken freely and honestly to the Professor shortly after her creation. Her unique power is ice breath, and in the reboot, she can create pink energy constructs.

==== Bubbles ====
Bubbles (voiced by Tara Strong in the series, Kristen Li in the reboot, Kath Soucie in What a Cartoon!) is one of the three main protagonists and the "softest and sweetest" of the three. She has blonde hair tied into two pigtails. Her signature color is light blue and her personality ingredient is "sugar". Though kind, she is a capable fighter and can understand various languages, including that of animals, and create powerful sonic blasts. In the reboot, Bubbles can create blue energy constructs.

==== Buttercup ====
Buttercup (voiced by E. G. Daily in What a Cartoon! and the 1998 original series, Natalie Palamides in the 2016 reboot) is one of the three main protagonists, who is described as a "tough hotheaded tomboy". She has short black hair in a flip with a small triangular part in her bangs. Her signature color is lime green and her personality ingredient is "spice". Though short-tempered and argumentative, she deeply cares about her sisters and the people around her. According to The Powerpuff Girls Movie, Buttercup disliked the name she was given. Her unique power is curling her tongue. In the reboot, Buttercup can create green energy constructs. McCracken originally wanted to name the character "Bud" until a friend suggested the name Buttercup.

== Secondary characters ==
=== Professor Utonium ===
Professor Utonium
- The Powerpuff Girls character
- First appearance: "A Sticky Situation!" (1992, prototype); "The Stayover" (2016)
- Created by: Craig McCracken
- Voiced by: Tom Kane

In-universe information
- Gender: Male
- Occupation: Scientist
- Family: Eugene Utonium (brother)
- Spouse: Unnamed wife
- Children: Blossom (created daughter); Bubbles (created daughter); Buttercup (created daughter)
- Home: Townsville, U.S.A.
- Nationality: American

Professor Utonium (voiced by Tom Kane) is a scientist who works in his home in the suburbs of the City of Townsville, and the Powerpuff Girls' loving creator and father. Utonium once housed Jojo (later to become Mojo Jojo) as a lab assistant who proved to be reckless and destructive. While Utonium was stirring his perfect girl concoction, Jojo shoved him, causing him to accidentally break a flask containing the mysterious "Chemical X" which spilled into the formula, thus creating the Powerpuff Girls. Utonium is a genius in many fields of science, and has shown knowledge in fields such as physics, chemistry, and biology, as well as being a skilled inventor.

=== The Mayor of Townsville ===
The Mayor of Townsville (voiced by Tom Kenny in the series, Jim Cummings in What a Cartoon!) is, as implied, the diminutive mayor of Townsville. He is generally referred throughout only as "Mayor", although he is referred to as "Barney" by his wife in the episode "Boogie Frights". Though dimwitted and cowardly, he cares deeply for his city. He loves pickles and often calls the girls to help open his pickle jar. The What a Cartoon! episode "Meat Fuzzy Lumpkins" featured a different Mayor who was younger, taller and more competent than the Mayor of the series.

=== Ms. Bellum ===
Ms. Sara Bellum (voiced by Jennifer Martin) is the Mayor's secretary, who often handles issues that he cannot. Her face is never seen on camera, due to it being obscured by over the top edge of the screen or camera angles in which her voluminous curly hair prevents a clear view of her face, sometimes her neck is drawn two inches taller while obscuring her face in the earlier episodes. Her name is a pun on cerebellum. She is largely absent in the reboot due to concerns over her sexualized design. As a result, Bellum only appears in one episode, where she takes a 1,000-day-long sabbatical.

=== Ms. Keane ===
Ms. Keane (voiced by Jennifer Hale in the series, Kath Soucie in What a Cartoon!) is the kindergarten teacher of Pokey Oaks Kindergarten. She is well-liked among her students for being patient and understanding. Ms. Keane forbids any fighting in school, even if there is a crisis taking place within it; she convinces the girls that there are other ways to solve problems other than fighting. Keane is named after Margaret Keane, the main influence behind the design of the Powerpuff Girls.

=== Narrator ===
Narrator (voiced by Tom Kenny in the series, Craig McCracken in Whoopass Stew, Ernie Anderson in What a Cartoon!) is the unseen voiceover narrator of the show. He serves as comic relief and occasionally becomes involved in the series' events.

=== Talking Dog ===
Talking Dog (voiced by Tom Kane in the series, Paul Mercier in What a Cartoon!) is a small white dog who serves as comic relief. He is frequently abused in almost every appearance he makes; as a running gag, no one ever seems to regard his pain and simply ignores him.

=== Mitch Mitchelson ===
Mitch Mitchelson (voiced by Tom Kenny) is a bully at Pokey Oaks Kindergarten. He was the host of "Mitch Rocks", a segment on Cartoon Network where he looked at various things and determined whether they "rock" or not.

=== Stanley Whitfield ===
Stanley Whitfield (voiced by Tom Kane) is a Townsville anchorman.

== Villains ==
=== Mojo Jojo ===
Mojo Jojo
- The Powerpuff Girls character
- First appearance: "Monkey See Doggie Do" (1998); "The Stayover" (2016)
- Created by: Craig McCracken
- Voiced by: Roger L. Jackson

In-universe information
- Species: Chimpanzee
- Gender: Male
- Occupation: Supervillain
- Family: Professor Utonium (owner, formerly); Unnamed father (deceased); Unnamed mother (only in the 2016 reboot)
- Home: Townsville, U.S.A.

Mojo Jojo (voiced by Roger L. Jackson) is the Powerpuff Girls' archenemy. He is a mutated chimpanzee mad scientist with high intelligence and a protruding brain who speaks with a Japanese accent in an overly exaggerated and repetitive manner. Mojo Jojo was Professor Utonium's reckless pet and lab assistant, Jojo, before Professor Utonium created the Powerpuff Girls; the same accident that created the Girls gave Jojo his super-intelligence. Mojo lives in an observatory located atop a dormant volcano in Townsville Central Park.

=== Fuzzy Lumpkins ===
Fuzzy Lumpkins (voiced by Jim Cummings) is a pink, furry hillbilly monster who speaks in a southern accent and lives in the woods neighboring Townsville. Fuzzy has a limited intellectual capacity, and is not nearly so active and ambitious as most of the villains in the series. He usually limits himself to shooting anyone whom he finds trespassing on his property, though he is also prone to destructive fits of rage. Fuzzy belongs to a race of "Lumpkins"; he has three siblings (Furry, Fluffy, and Hairy), three nephews (Buzzy, Wuzzy, and Scuzzy), and several dozen cousins who closely resemble him.

=== HIM ===
HIM (voiced by Tom Kane) is an effeminate, enigmatic demon whose plans are usually psychological in nature, as he often attempts to manipulate events to drive the Powerpuff Girls insane or drive a wedge between them. HIM possesses various supernatural abilities, including shapeshifting, mind control, and manipulating reality and energy. Craig McCracken has stated that "HIM" was inspired by the Chief Blue Meanie from Yellow Submarine.

=== Princess Morbucks ===
Princess Morbucks (voiced by Jennifer Hale in the original series, Haley Mancini in the reboot) is a spoiled, rich, and bratty young girl who hates the Powerpuff Girls due to a rebuffed attempt to join them. Her father, "Daddy" Morbucks (a play on Little Orphan Annie's Daddy Warbucks), dotes on her and indulges in her whims, but it is implied that his patience is limited and Princess fears truly angering him. Because of him, she has access to virtually unlimited financial resources.

=== The Gangreen Gang ===
The Gangreen Gang are a gang of five green-skinned teenage hoodlums who, despite not having powers and often not posing a threat, can be dangerous when motivated. They delight in vandalizing and tormenting those weaker than themselves, especially children and the elderly. The Gangreen Gang lives in an old shack in Townsville's junkyard.

- Ace (voiced by Jeff Bennett): A cruel and opportunistic fiend with a slick-back haircut, a colored vest-jacket, a peach-fuzz mustache, a pair of shades, and also has fangs. He speaks with an Italian-New Yorker accent. As the Gang's leader and their smartest member, he is the instigator of most of their antisocial activities, and does possess a certain charismatic charm that allows him to sweet-talk people who ought to know better. His full name is Ace Copular. In 2018, Ace joined the virtual band Gorillaz as their bassist while Murdoc Niccals was in prison.
- Snake (voiced by Tom Kenny): A slippery character with a forked tongue, skinny body and a hissing voice. He is the Gang's second-in-command, but this mostly makes him a sniveling yes-man to Ace. It is revealed in "Schoolhouse Rocked" that his real name is Sanford D. Ingleberry.
- Lil' Arturo (voiced initially by Carlos Alazraqui, subsequently by Tom Kenny): A diminutive Mexican boy who seems to take the most amusement from the Gang's activities. In the episode "Schoolhouse Rocked" he carries around a switchblade-styled comb he calls "Maria", a treasured gift from his incarcerated father. His full name is Arturo de la Guerra.
- Grubber (voiced by Jeff Bennett): A grotesque, barefoot hunchback with untidy hair, grubby clothes and protruding eyes, who barely speaks and communicates through nonverbal sounds. He does, however, occasionally demonstrate unexpected talents, such as playing the violin, speaking eloquently or performing impersonations. When attending the girls' school for a short time, Grubber showed that he was able to horribly contort his body, making him briefly resemble a well-spoken and handsome-looking young man before snapping back to his normal self.
- Big Billy (voiced by Jeff Bennett): A hulking, dimwitted colossus who acts as the Gang's muscle. Though he does at times display a childlike innocence, he mostly just does the bidding of his more savvy and vindictive friends. In the episode "Schoolhouse Rocked", it is revealed that his real name is William W. Williams and that he is a cyclops.

=== The Amoeba Boys ===
The Amoeba Boys (voiced by Chuck McCann in the series and What a Cartoon!, Lou Romano in Whoopass Stew) are a trio of mutant amoebas with Brooklyn accents who aspire to be respected villains, but are too incompetent to achieve it. Though largely harmless, their actions have sometimes endangered Townsville.

- Bossman: The Amoeba Boys' leader. In the pilot, he is depicted with a cigar in his mouth.
- Junior: The smallest of the Amoeba Boys. He wears a black hat. In What a Cartoon!, he was named Tiny.
- Slim: The tallest and most dimwitted of the Amoeba Boys. He wears a brown fedora. In What a Cartoon!, he was named Skinny Slim.

=== The Rowdyruff Boys ===
The Rowdyruff Boys are the Powerpuff Girls' evil male counterparts, created by Mojo Jojo using a mixture of "snips, snails, a puppy dog tail", and radioactive toilet water, and possess the same powers as them. They are Brick (red), Boomer (dark blue), and Butch (green). They were destroyed when the girls kissed them, but were later resurrected by HIM.

- Brick (voiced by Rob Paulsen): Blossom's male counterpart and the Rowdyruff Boys' self-proclaimed leader. His short temper and rashness often causes conflict with his brothers. His signature color is red, and he wears a backwards red baseball cap compared to Blossom's bow. He also originally had bangs, which were replaced with long spiky hair when he was revived.
- Boomer (voiced by Rob Paulsen): Bubbles' male counterpart. He is a loud-mouthed dunce, in contrast to Bubbles' sweetness, and likes disgusting things. Boomer is the least intelligent of the boys, and is often bullied and bossed around by Brick and Butch. His signature is dark blue and Boomer's hair parts in a curved fashion like Bubbles', but is longer and spiky on each end, in a wings haircut.
- Butch (voiced by Roger L. Jackson): Buttercup's male counterpart. He is hyperactive and easily excited. His signature is green and his hair is spiked upwards, abandoning his previous cowlick from his first appearance. He also shares Buttercup's small triangular hair parting.

=== Sedusa ===
Sedusa (voiced by Jennifer Hale) is a Gorgon-like seductress with prehensile hair and a master of disguise who uses her feminine wiles to influence men to do her bidding. She is absent in the reboot due to concerns over her sexualized design.

== The Powerpuff Girls 2016-exclusive characters ==
=== Allies ===
==== Blisstina "Bliss" ====
Blisstina "Bliss" (voiced by Olivia Olson) is the original Powerpuff Girl in the 2016 series. Ten years prior to the main events of the series, Professor Utonium attempts to create the perfect little girl in response to his rival Newtronium creating the perfect little boy; Utonium uses sugar, spice, and everything nice. However, he accidentally adds Chemical W to the concoction, thus creating Bliss. Mojo Jojo also considered himself Bliss' childhood friend when he was the Professor's lab assistant. Bliss possesses superhuman strength, supersonic flight, superhuman hearing, laser vision, and limited invulnerability. Bliss' powers caused the destruction of Utonium's residence after she throws a temper tantrum, and Utonium ends up unconscious. Bliss isolates herself for several years before returning to Townsville. Him, who had masqueraded as Bliss's elephant Mee, manipulates Bliss into fusing with him and causes mayhem using Bliss's body. Bliss breaks free from Him's control and helps defeat him. Later in the series, Bliss joins the Universal Protection Bureau, an intergalactic police force.

==== The Derbytantes ====
The Derbytantes (voiced by Kate Higgins) are a group of bad girl roller skaters who Buttercup usually likes hanging around with. Introduced in the 2016 series, they are never seen without their skates and enjoy playing "Deathball" (a sport resembling a cross between dodgeball and rollerball). Notable members include Maylyn, Jaylyn, Haylyn, and Bobby Susan Ray-Lyn.

==== Donny ====
Donny (voiced by Josh Fadem) is a young unicorn and Bubbles' friend. Donny is originally unaware they are unicorns because of the thick hair on their heads covering their horn, but still seeks to become one by having Professor Utonium transform him into one.

=== Villains ===
==== Packrat ====
Packrat (voiced by Jason Spisak) is a scheming, oversized rat who loves stealing "shiny things" from stores and the people of Townsville, which he sees as gifts for various dolls he views as girlfriends.

==== Allegro ====
Allegro (voiced by Eric Bauza) is a panda-like being who can cause people to go into a stupor of pure happiness. "Largo" reveals that he and Largo were originally one being before being split by a cosmic storm, before they later remerge.

==== Manboy ====
Manboy (voiced by Maurice LaMarche) is a short man with super strength and a magical beard. He is incredibly sexist and constantly declares men are superior to women. Manboy is later revealed to be a child who gained an adult body when he got his powers.

==== The Fashionistas ====
Bianca and Barbarus Bikini (respectively voiced by Lily Vonnegut and Natalie Palamides) are a human woman and gorilla. Bianca was initially chosen to be the new assistant of the Mayor before being found out.

==== Jemmica/Jemoire ====
Jemmica (voiced by Anais Fairweather) is a thief who masquerades as a treasure hunter and adventurer. "Total Eclipse of the Kart" reveals that she is an ancient evil entity named Jemoire.

==== Silico ====
Silico (voiced by Jason Spisak) first appears in the episode "Viral Spiral", where he offers the Amoeba Boys a way to destroy the internet and finally become big-name villains. In the episode "Halt and Catch Silico", it is revealed that Silico was originally a lonely child who built robots to keep him company. His robots were accidentally destroyed when a monster the Powerpuff Girls defeated fell on his house, causing him to swear revenge against the Powerpuff Girls.
