= Fanny Avonne =

Swedish musical artist (born 2001)

Background information
- Born: Astrid Nova Fanny Granström; 29 July 2001 (age 25)
- Genres: Pop, R&B, dance, acoustic
- Occupations: Singer, songwriter, dancer, actress
- Instruments: Vocals; guitar; piano; violin; bass guitar; recorder; ukulele
- Years active: 2014–present
- Labels: 21:12; Universal; BMG; 300

Astrid Nova Fanny Granström (born 29 July 2001), known professionally as Fanny Avonne and formerly as Nova Miller, is a Swedish singer, songwriter, and multi-instrumentalist. She is known for her work in the pop and soul genres, as well as her retro-inspired aesthetic. Avonne moved to Los Angeles, California in 2019.

== Life ==
Miller was born in Stockholm in 2001. Her mother, Claudia Müller Granström, is a flutist with a master's degree from the Royal College of Music in Stockholm, and also plays the piano. Her father, Johan Granström, is a bassist who has toured with folk rock duo Nordman and is bandleader for folk rock group Hej Kalle. Both of Miller's maternal grandparents were pianists and her paternal grandfather was a musician and bandleader. Miller also toured with Nordman and as part of the folk music trio Frispel.

Miller's main instrument is the guitar. She also plays piano, violin, and to a lesser extent bass, recorder, and ukulele. She began playing the violin at age four and began dance at age six. In 2010, she wrote her first song and formed a girl band with her friends, in which she sang and played bass. The year of 2012, she got her first guitar and began songwriting.

== Career ==
==== As Nova Miller ====
On 11 March 2013, Miller performed Christina Aguilera's "Hurt" in Eric Ericsonhallen (the former Skeppsholmen Church).

Oh 30 January 2014, Miller performed Bachelor Girl's "Buses and Trains" at the "Växjö för Filippinernas barn" benefit concert, held in the Växjö concert hall. About a month later, she performed the same song accompanied by her father's band Hej Kalle and Kalle Moraeus, at the annual Barncancer Galan (the Childhood Cancer Gala) held at Sälens Högfjällshotell.

In mid-March 2014, Miller, still using the name Fanny Granström, had qualified for the final round in the Under Fifteen category of Helges Talangjakt, an international music festival held in Gävle.

In 2014, at age twelve, Miller was discovered by British music executive Lolene Rothenberg at Lasse Kühlers dance school in Stockholm. She was invited to Rothenberg's studio, where she again performed "Buses and Trains." She went on to attend Nacka musikklasser and later Maestroskolan, two music schools located in Nacka Municipality near the family home where she grew up. Here, she continued to improve her guitar and voice skills.

In the spring of 2015, 21:12 Entertainment signed Miller to Universal Music. She released her debut track "Supernova" on 12 June 2015. The song reached Spotify's viral chart. The lyrics address Miller's experiences with bullying at school and online.

Miller released an original Christmas single entitled "My Perfect Christmas" on 25 November 2015. The single was ranked No. 13 out of 100 Best Christmas songs of all time by the Swedish newspaper Expressen.

On 27 May 2016, Miller released the retro pop track "So Good," inspired by James Brown's song "I Got You (I Feel Good)." The music video premiered on MTV, on 27 June of the same year. The track was later featured on her debut EP.

On 18 August 2017, Miller released the lead single for her upcoming debut EP Yellow, "Anything for U." The second single off the EP, "Turn Up the Fire", debuted on On Air with Ryan Seacrest on 25 January 2018. The track was nominated for 'Pop Song of the Year' at the 2019 Scandipop Awards. Miller's debut EP Yellow was released on 1 June 2018.

On May 18, 2018, Miller performed both "Turn Up the Fire" and "Patterns" from her EP Yellow on the Faux Real Podcast with Devlin Wilder. The episode on which she appears was the very first of the podcast to be recorded at The Ruby black box theatre after recording was moved from the Nerdist Studio after Meltdown Comics closed down.

On 4 October 2019, Miller released "Do It To Myself," the lead single for her upcoming second EP The Passion. The second single, "Mi Amor," was released on 29 May 2020. On 18 September, the third single, "Girls Like Us," was released. Miller's second EP The Passion was released on 16 October. Later in the year Miller released two Christmas singles titled "Red Dress" and "Only When It Snows."

In August 2021, Miller released "Apricot Skies," featuring Bankrol Hayden, as the lead single for upcoming third EP Sting. On 12 November 2021, the second single, "Done," was released. The third single, "Cold Feet," was released on 21 January 2022. Miller's third EP Sting was released on 29 July 2022.

== Appearances ==
In 2018, Miller performed on Grattis Kronprinsessan, an annual live television broadcast where notable Swedish artists perform in celebration of Crown Princess Victoria of Sweden's birthday. Miller has also collaborated with sportswear brand Puma with her single "Not Your Number," released on 3 August 2018.

In television, Miller starred as the lead in the Swedish show Svansen i kläm in 2018. Later in the year she provided the voice of the fourth Powerpuff Girl, Bliss, in the Swedish dub for Cartoon Network.

== Discography ==
=== Studio Albums ===
List of studio albums, with selected details and chart positions
Title	Album details	Peaks
Title	Album details	SWE
Vad gör jag nu?	Released: 2 October 2026; Label: Roxy Recordings; Formats: CD, LP, digital download, streaming	13

=== Extended plays ===
Title	EP details
Yellow	Released: 1 June 2018; Label: 21:12 Entertainment, BMG Rights Mgmt Scandinavia AB; Format: Digital download, streaming
The Passion	Released: 16 October 2020; Label: 300 Entertainment, 21:12; Format: Digital download, streaming
Sting	Released: 29 July 2022; Label: 300 Entertainment, 21:12; Format: Digital download, streaming
Växtvärk	Released: 16 January 2026; Label: Roxy Recordings, Playground Music; Format: Digital download, streaming

=== Singles ===
Title	Year	Peak chart positions		Certifications	Album	Ref.
Title	Year	SWE	NOR	Certifications	Album	Ref.
"Supernova"	2015	—	—		Non-album singles	
"Singing in the Rain"	2015	—	—		Non-album singles	
"My Perfect Christmas"	2015	—	—		Non-album singles	
"So Good"	2016	—	—		Yellow	
"Anything for U"	2017	—	—		Yellow	
"Turn Up the Fire"	2018	—	—		Yellow	
"TUTF"	2018	—	—		Non-album singles	
"Not Your Number"	2018	—	—		Non-album singles	
"Do It To Myself"	2019	—	—		The Passion	
"Mi Amor"	2020	—	—		The Passion	
"Girls Like Us"	2020	—	—		The Passion	
"Red Dress"	2020	—	—		Non-album singles	
"Only When It Snows"	2020	—	—		Non-album singles	
"Apricot Skies" (featuring Bankrol Hayden)	2021	—	—		Sting	
"Done"	2021	—	—		Sting	
"Cold Feet"	2022	—	—		Sting	
"Venus"	2022	—	—		Sting	
"Tusen spänn" (with Tjuvjakt)	2025	1	20	GLF: Gold	Non-album single	
"Ringar på vatten"	2025	—	—		Vad gör jag nu?	
"Tiden läker alla sår"	2025	—	—		Vad gör jag nu?	
"Växtvärk"	2025	—	—		Vad gör jag nu?	
"Vad gör jag nu?"	2026	—	—		Vad gör jag nu?	
"Orden"	2026	—	—		Vad gör jag nu?	
"Sovplats"	2026	—	—		Vad gör jag nu?	

== Filmography ==
=== Television ===
Year	Title	Role	Notes	Ref.
2018	Svansen i kläm	Filippa	Season 1, 8 episodes	

=== Voice over roles ===
Year	Title	Role	Notes	Ref.
2017	Your Name	Mitsuha Miyamizu	Swedish voice	
2018	The Powerpuff Girls	Bliss (Sv: Blända)	Swedish voice	

== Achievements ==
=== Awards and nominations ===
Award	Year (Note: Indicates the year of ceremony. Each year is linked to the article about the awards held that year, wherever possible.)	Recipient(s) and nominee(s)	Category	Result	Ref.
Scandipop Awards	2019	"Turn Up The Fire"	Pop Song of the Year	Nominated	
