= Blossom (The Powerpuff Girls) =

Fictional character

- The Powerpuff Girls character
- Blossom as she appears in the original 1998 Powerpuff Girls television series
- First appearance: "Whoopass Stew: A Sticky Situation" (1992 short)
- Created by: Craig McCracken
- Portrayed by: Chloe Bennet (unaired CW pilot)
- Voiced by: Jennifer Fried (1992); Cathy Cavadini (1998 series); Emiri Kato (Japanese, Powerpuff Girls Z); Nicole Bouma (English, Powerpuff Girls Z); Amanda Leighton (2016 series)

In-universe information
- Nicknames: "Commander and the Leader"
- Species: Artificial Human
- Gender: Female
- Occupation: Student; Superhero
- Affiliation: The Powerpuff Girls
- Family: Professor Utonium (father and creator); Bubbles (triplet sister); Buttercup (triplet sister); Bunny (younger sister); Bliss (older sister)
- Ingredients: Chemical X; Everything nice
- Location: The City of Townsville

Blossom is a fictional character that serves as one of the three main protagonists of The Powerpuff Girls franchise. She was created by Craig McCracken and made her first appearance in the Whoopass Stew! short "A Sticky Situation" in 1992, and was fully introduced in the television series The Powerpuff Girls in 1998.

She is portrayed as the tactician and self-proclaimed leader of the Powerpuff Girls, alongside her sisters Bubbles and Buttercup, with whom she fights crime in the city of Townsville. She is the most level-headed, intelligent, and composed member of the team, and has orange waist-length hair worn in a ponytail, decorated with a red bow and a hair clip. Her unique abilities include ice breath, microscopic vision, and advanced intelligence.

A toy line and series of video games featuring the character and her sisters have also been produced.

== Description ==
=== Main concept ===
Blossom is the leader of the Powerpuff Girls: a trio of superheroes made up of her and her sisters Bubbles and Buttercup, with whom she fights crime and takes care of various emergencies in the city of Townsville, normally upon being called by the Mayor through the "Powerpuff Hotline". The girls were created by Professor Utonium from a mixture of "sugar, spice and everything nice" when he was trying to create the "perfect little girl", and their many superpowers were granted by the accidental addition of "Chemical X". Each episode of the 1998 television series briefly depicts this event in its title sequence, and is further explored in the prequel The Powerpuff Girls Movie (2002). In the original short from which The Powerpuff Girls derive (titled Whoopass Stew!), the substance that accidentally creates the girls is "a can of Whoopass", which was replaced by "Chemical X" in the television series.

=== Design ===
Blossom and her sisters have abnormally large eyes (inspired by Margaret Keane's paintings of little children), round oval-shaped heads, stubby arms and stubby legs. They also lack noses, ears, fingers, toes, and necks (these are assumable in some cases, but never part of the design). McCracken preferred them to look more symbolic of actual children rather than going for a "realistic" look, meaning fewer body parts were needed. They normally wear dresses that match the colors of their eyes, each decorated with a black stripe, along with white stockings and black Mary Janes. Blossom is the redhead and differentiates from her sisters by sporting a bow-crowned ponytail (which also signifies her leadership) and pink as her signature color. Both her bow and ponytail work as a means to heighten the feeling of movement in the animation. Although her hair is not longer than her body, it often looks longer when she is flying.

=== Voice actors ===
The character has had up to sixteen voice actors for different regions and series, being voiced by Emiri Katō in the Japanese dub of Powerpuff Girls Z. Cathy Cavadini was in her thirties when she voiced Blossom in English in the early 2000s, and became recognized for this role.

Before the 2016 series aired, Cavadini was displeased to learn that her role had been recast with Amanda Leighton. Tara Strong, the original voice of Bubbles, called the decision "a stab in the heart" on Twitter. Strong also announced in February 2015 that this was a "strictly creative" decision by Cartoon Network, though in June of the same year she said that the network did not contact any of the three actresses who voiced the original Powerpuff Girls prior to the decision to recast. Cavadini speculated that this could have been a matter of age discrimination, given that Cartoon Network wanted the voice cast to do appearances in person, thus choosing to represent the girls through younger actresses. However, at the 2017 New York Comic Con, Strong stated that she had no ill will towards the new cast and had given the show her blessing, as did Cavadini in 2018, by saying that she and Leighton were friends on Facebook.

=== Portrayal ===
In March 2021, Chloe Bennet was cast as Blossom's adult version in the live-action The CW television series Powerpuff. However, she quit in August due to scheduling conflicts, and the project was officially cancelled in 2023. In a leaked trailer of the pilot episode, Bennet's portrayal of Blossom is described as someone "constantly stressed" who abandoned her responsibilities as a superhero after accidentally killing Mojo, the Girls human arch-nemesis. A few scenes also implied a "romantic spark" between Blossom and Mojo's son, Jojo Jr. (Nicholas Podany).

== Appearances ==
=== In The Powerpuff Girls (1998–2005) ===
"Blossom is the brains — she's the one who figures everything out and tries to keep control. She's like a Girl Scout, always trying to do the right thing."

— Craig McCracken, creator of The Powerpuff Girls

In the 1998 series, Blossom (voiced by Cathy Cavadini) is the "commander and leader" of the Powerpuff Girls and a regular student at Pokey Oaks Kindergarten. She is the smartest and most logical of the trio, coming up with most of their battle plans, and is depicted as a natural born tactician. While mentally the most mature, composed, and level-headed, she also has tendencies towards fussiness, vanity, overanalysis, and can be annoyingly overbearing towards Buttercup and Bubbles. As the leader, she often mediates between the two but frequently rivals with Buttercup due to their contrasting natures. Nevertheless, she loves her sisters dearly, but will lecture them on certain occasions. Creator Craig McCracken described her as "bookish, methodical and maternal".

Blossom is not exempt from committing certain reprehensible acts, however in the few instances she does something wrong (such as stealing golf clubs to give the Professor for Father's Day) she is quick to own up to her wrongdoing. In her spare time, Blossom enjoys reading and academic pursuits, although like most children her age, also enjoys video games, cartoons, comic books, playing outside, and watching other superheroes. While not as inherently girly as Bubbles, Blossom makes beauty a point of emphasis, especially in taking care of her hair, which is a source of pride.

=== In Powerpuff Girls Z ===
In Powerpuff Girls Z, the magical girl version of Blossom is named Momoko Akatsutsumi (赤堤 ももこ, Akatsutsumi Momoko) / Hyper Blossom (ハイパー・ブロッサム Haipā Burossamu) in the original Japanese version, while being called Blossom in the English dubbed version. She is a 13-year-old middle schooler and a member of the Powerpuff Girls Z, where she is no longer a creation of Professor Utonium and her link to Bubbles and Buttercup is rather circumstantial. She uses a yo-yo as her signature weapon and, like the original Blossom, is the self-proclaimed leader of the team. However, she is extremely ditzy and tends to hyperfixate on the boys she crushes on.

Blossom also has a strong appetite for sweets and can get very cranky when she doesn't eat them for a long time. Although often distracted and has been known to whine, Blossom tries her best to protect New Townsville, lead the girls, and help her friends regardless of her situation. She can be very clever and crafty when needed, usually being the first to come up with a plan to trick or defeat a monster that the girls are having trouble with. She has a younger sister named Kuriko Akatsutsumi (赤堤 くりこ, Akatsutsumi Kuriko) in the original Japanese version, while being called Kasey in the English dubbed version.

=== In The Powerpuff Girls (2016–2019) ===
Blossom as depicted in the 2016 series

In the 2016 The Powerpuff Girls series, Blossom (voiced by Amanda Leighton) is once again depicted as the leader of the team. Her appearance is similar to her original counterpart with the exception of her bow, which is bigger and more rounded. Now a primary school student, she loves organization and hates when things are messy or out of order. She has a perfect attendance record and is an overachiever. She can be stubborn at times, but still comes through. Her unique abilities are ice breath, genius-level intelligence, microscopic vision, natural leadership skills, and intuitive aptitude. She also can project bright pink energy and manipulate it into various household and office items, an ability her 1998 counterpart does not possess.

== Powers and abilities ==
Blossom and her sisters all have superpowers such as flight, superhuman strength, superhuman speed, superhuman senses, limited invulnerability, x-ray vision, red heat vision, energy projection, space survivability, and thermal resistance.

Blossom's special power is Ice Breath (as established in the episode "Ice Sore", from 1999), which allows her to freeze things by simply blowing her breath on them. In certain instances she also uses the power of microscopic vision, can shoot lightning bolts, and has eidetic memory. Aside from this, she also shows interest in Chinese language and playing electric guitar. As for her abilities as a leader, Blossom always shows determination, has a sense of danger, is quick to action and often calls out names for attack formations during battles.

== Reception ==
TV Guide collectively chose Blossom, Bubbles, and Buttercup as No. 13 in a list of the 50 Greatest cartoon characters of all time. In the book America Toons In: A History of Television Animation (2014), author David Perlmutter describes Blossom from the 1998 series as a "strong-willed figure who is equal parts diplomat, intellectual, general and politician". However, this also plays as a flaw in her overall depiction as a seemingly superior member of the Powerpuff Girls, since she often displays her "tactless arrogance toward friends and foes alike", to which Perlmutter adds: "But McCracken and company never allow her to go too far. The consequences of her arrogance are often depicted severely, forcing Blossom to retrench into a moving contrition."

The Powerpuff Girls have been regarded as representations of femininity and girl power. For author and scholar Rebecca Hains, Blossom's "long flowing ponytail" with a big red bow "perhaps signifies that she is the most femininely nice" of the trio, which goes along with the idea that "performing femininity is part of the point of girl power." However, when her hair gets butchered in the episode "The Mane Event" (2000), which makes her subject of much ridicule by the people of Townsville, Blossom loses her confidence and chooses isolation over fighting a monster with her sisters. According to Hains, the eventual overcoming of such an embarrassment teaches the viewer the valuable lesson that "using power effectively is more important than looking good." She adds, however, that "Although one meaning of [the episode] could be that appearance should be subordinate to behavior, a resistant reading of 'The Mane Event' suggests that looking girlish is no choice, but rather an imperative of girl power."

In a critical essay on the 1998 series, Argentinian author Márgara Averbach stated that there appear to be ethnic implications in Blossom's design, describing her as "the redhead, descendant of northern Europeans" (deeming it part of a "very traditional classification of human characteristics") and observing that her appearances on screen usually obey a hierarchy among her sisters (when Blossom is in the middle, closer to the upper part of the screen, meaning that she guides the other two). Averbach also noted that a description of Blossom on Cartoon Network's website characterized her as "brains and beauty" (the "good side" of the "perfect little girl" experiment, similarly to Bubbles), which is heightened by Blossom's signature pink, something that she links to "old stereotypes of femininity". Despite this, Craig McCracken argued that he designed the girls while simply looking for "a little diversity and balance" in the drawing, not knowing that these characters would transcend his initial intent.

== See also ==
- List of The Powerpuff Girls characters
- List of Powerpuff Girls Z characters
- Bliss (The Powerpuff Girls)
