= Due Drop =

Studio album by Toya Delazy
- Released: 23 April 2012
- Recorded: 2011–2012
- Genre: Jazz; electro; hip hop; pop
- Label: SME Africa
- Producer: Jax Panik; Octave Couplet; Justin Denobrega

Toya Delazy chronology
Due Drop (2012)	Ascension (2014)

Singles from Due Drop
- 1. "Pump It On" Released: 28 October 2011; 2. "Love is in the Air" Released: 2 April 2012; 3. "Are You Gonna Stay?" Released: 27 July 2012; 4. "Heart" Released: 17 October 2012; 5. "Memoriam" Released: 30 September 2013

Due Drop is the debut studio album by South African singer Toya Delazy. It was released by SME Africa on 23 April 2012. The album is a fusion of JEHP, an acronym for Jazz, Electro, Hip hop, and Pop. Due Drop received generally positive reviews from music critics, who commended its production, sound and commercial appeal. The album sold over 20,000 copies and was awarded a Gold plaque by the Recording Industry of South Africa. The deluxe edition won Best Pop Album at the 2013 South African Music Awards and received two nominations at the 2013 Metro FM Music Awards.

== Background and promotion ==
The Soil appears on Due Drop's standard edition, while a collaboration with Ross Jack is included on the deluxe edition. The album was supported by the singles "Pump It On", "Love Is In the Air", "Are You Gonna Stay?", "Heart", and "Memoriam". The artwork for all three installments of the album was conceptualized and created by photographer Ross Garrett. Production for the album's standard edition was primarily handled by Jax Panik, along with assistance from the Joburg-based production duo Octave Couplet. The album's deluxe edition includes additional production and remixes from Justin Denobrega, Pascal & Pearce, and Classy Menace.

"Pump It On" was released as the album's lead single on 28 October 2011. The song was produced by Jax Van Heerden and Johnny Deridder. It received substantial airplay on 5FM and Metro FM. The music video for "Pump It On" was released on 15 November 2011. On 2 April 2012, SME Africa released "Love Is In the Air" as the album's second single. Its music video was uploaded to Vevo on 26 March 2012. Classy Menace's remix of the song appeared on the deluxe edition. The album's third single, "Are You Gonna Stay", was released on 27 July 2012, along with its music video.

"Heart" was released as the album's fourth single. Pascal & Pearce produced the official remix, which appeared on the album's deluxe edition. The music video for "Heart" was directed by Jeana Theron of Velocity Films and aided by Great Heart. The video was filmed over the course of three days, with a full hour spent on 12 frames. The album's fifth single, "Memoriam", was released on 30 September 2013. The song was written to honor one of Delazy's teachers who died in 2009. Lyrically, "Memoriam" delves into themes of pain and hopelessness, as well as the acceptance and healing that come with time. Delazy said writing the song alleviated some of her psychological and emotional trauma. Channel 24 included "Memoriam" on their list of the 15 Best SA songs of 2013. The music video for "Memoriam" was filmed in Gauteng by Fausto Becatti.

== Composition ==
The song "Love is in the Air" has elements of house groove beats. "Are You Gonna Stay?" is a mid tempo song; Delazy's vocals on the track is reminiscent of Nicki Minaj. "Jai Lover" is an electro pop song with Zulu lyrics. "Yeah Hell Yeah (With You)" is an ode to her sexual instincts. Delazy meditated and thought in silence on the broken hearted ballad "Love Takes Time". "Memoriam" is an electro anthem centered around the loss of love and life.

== Critical reception ==
Professional ratings
Review scores
Source	Rating
The Times	8/10
You	4/5 stars
Channel 24	3/5 stars

Due Drop received generally positive reviews from music critics. Channel 24's Georgina Marques awarded the album 3 stars out of 5, calling it "unashamedly pop" and praising Delazy's musical background and classical training. Moreover, Marques believes the album's songs "transcend the superficial genre and offer a more layered and interesting sound." In a review for Indie Does It, Genevieve Vieira said the album is "altogether satisfactory" and commended Delazy for having "everything it takes, from the style, to the voice, flair and talent".

Writing for GoXtra News, Molebogeng Maunatlala said the album is accommodating because it "satisfies all the music lovers, and goes from Jazz, soul, hip hop to house". TimesLIVE writer Lebohang Nthongoa said it is "catchy and has a vibe all its own". You magazine granted the album 4 stars out of 5. In a less enthusiastic review, Nyeleti Machovani of Radio Biz said the lyrics "do not offer much depth" and that the heavy use of auto-tune is "a distraction to an artist who otherwise, has more to show."

== Accolades ==
Year	Awards ceremony	Award description(s)	Results	Ref
2013	South African Music Awards	Best Pop Album	Won	
2013	South African Music Awards	Newcomer of the Year	Won	
2013	Metro FM Music Awards	Best Top 5 Produced Album	Nominated	
2013	Metro FM Music Awards	Best Top 5 Female Album	Nominated	
2013	Metro FM Music Awards	Best Top 5 Newcomer	Nominated	
2013	Metro FM Music Awards	Top 5 Styled Artist/Group	Nominated	

== Track listing ==
No.	Title	Producer(s)	Length
1.	"With You (Intro)" (featuring The Soil)		0:50
2.	"Are You Gonna Stay?"		4:10
3.	"Heart"		4:04
4.	"Yeah Hell Yeah (With You)"		3:53
5.	"Love is in the Air"		4:29
6.	"Memoriam"		4:38
7.	"Pump It On"	Jax Panik	4:25
8.	"Love Takes Time"		3:45
9.	"It's All Good"	Octave Couplet	2:39
10.	"Jai Lover"		5:00
11.	"Say It Out"		3:24

Deluxe version
No.	Title	Producer(s)	Length
12.	"Losing My Love" (featuring Ross Jack)	Justin Denobrega	3:41
13.	"Say It Out"		3:26
14.	"Pump It On (Classy Menace Remix)"	Classy Menace	3:32
15.	"Love is in the Air (Classy Menace Remix Radio Edit)"	Classy Menace	3:18
16.	"Heart (Pascal & Pearce Remix)"	Pascal & Pearce	6:20

Super deluxe version (DVD)
No.	Title	Director(s)	Length
17.	"Pump It On"	Tristan Holmes; Adam Thal	4:29
18.	"Love is in the Air"		4:29
19.	"Are You Gonna Stay?"		3:47
20.	"Heart"	Jeana Theron	3:47

== Personnel ==
- Latoya Buthelezi – primary artist, composer
- Jax Panik – producer
- Octave Couplet – producer
- Justin Denobrega – producer
- Classy Menace – producer
- Pascal & Pearce – producer
- Ross Jack – featured artist
- The Soil – featured artist

== Release history ==
Digital platform	Date	Version	Format	Label
iTunes (South Africa)	23 April 2012	Standard	CD; digital download	Sony Music Entertainment Africa
iTunes (South Africa)	25 February 2013	Deluxe	CD; digital download	Sony Music Entertainment Africa
iTunes (South Africa)	22 February 2013	Super Deluxe	DVD; digital download	Sony Music Entertainment Africa
