= List of The Powerpuff Girls (2016 TV series) episodes =

The Powerpuff Girls is an American animated television series based on the original 1998 series by Craig McCracken, which is developed and directed by Nick Jennings and Bob Boyle. The series premiered on April 4, 2016. Voice actor Natalie Palamides announced that the series was renewed for a second season that premiered on March 3, 2017 with the series' first 22-minute special, "The Last Donnycorn". The third season premiered on April 8, 2018 and ended on June 16, 2019, marking the end of the series after three seasons, 119 episodes, and after airing for three years.

== Series overview ==
Season	Episodes		Originally released	
Season	Episodes		First released	Last released
Shorts	10	5	February 15, 2016	June 24, 2016
Shorts	10	5	March 3, 2017	September 18, 2017
1	39		April 4, 2016	December 24, 2016
2	40		March 3, 2017	May 13, 2018
3	40		April 8, 2018	June 16, 2019

== Episodes ==
=== Season 1 (2016) ===
No. overall	No. in season	Title	Written and storyboarded by	Story by	Original release date	Prod. code	U.S. viewers (millions)
1	1	"Escape from Monster Island"	Jaydeep Hasrajani and Grace Kraft	Haley Mancini and Jake Goldman	April 4, 2016	108	1.51
The Mayor needs rescuing from Monster Island; meanwhile, Blossom and Buttercup fight over who gets to attend a concert with Bubbles.
2	2	"Princess Buttercup"	Kyle Neswald and Benjamin P. Carow	Haley Mancini and Jake Goldman	April 4, 2016	102	1.51
When Buttercup starts hanging with the Derbytantes, Princess Morbucks wishes to join the Powerpuff Girls. Unfortunately, Princess betrays the girls by giving them a chest that lets out an indestructible "necronium" diamond heart that traps them inside, and it's up to Buttercup and the Derbytantes to save them and stop Princess Morbucks. Note: This episode takes place after "The Wrinklegruff Gals".
3	3	"The Stayover"	Jaydeep Hasrajani and Grace Kraft	Haley Mancini and Jake Goldman	April 5, 2016	103	1.31
Recovering from a candy hangover that happened the night before, Blossom and Buttercup must retrace their steps to locate Bubbles, who is missing.
4	4	"Painbow"	Julia Vickerman and Diego Molano	Haley Mancini and Jake Goldman	April 6, 2016	111	1.18
A mystical rainbow causes Townsville to become unnaturally happy, so the Powerpuff Girls set off to find out where it's coming from, discovering the source is new villain Allegro.
5	5	"Horn, Sweet Horn"	Julia Vickerman and Diego Molano	Emily Brundige, Haley Mancini, and Jake Goldman	April 7, 2016	104	1.26
Bubbles meets a talking pony named Donny, who wants to be a unicorn, but things take a wrong turn when Donny transforms into a monster that threatens Townsville.
6	6	"Man Up"	Kyle Neswald and Benjamin P. Carow	Haley Mancini and Jake Goldman	April 8, 2016	110	1.57
Buttercup adopts a New Age attitude after letting new villain Man-Boy escape and trashing up a New Age festival in a blind rage as a result of him calling her "princess". In order to defeat Man-Boy when he returns to take revenge, Buttercup aims to strike an order of balance between peace and struggle.
7	7	"Bye Bye, Bellum"	Kyle Neswald and Benjamin P. Carow	Steve Szlaga, Haley Mancini, and Jake Goldman	April 11, 2016	106	1.18
The Mayor of Townsville needs a new assistant after secretary Ms. Bellum gives notice. But after he hires Bianca Bikini, who just broke out of prison, she breaks her ape sister-in-arms, Barbarus, out of prison as well, then they kidnap the Powerpuff Girls! Now it's up to the Mayor to save them.
8	8	"Little Octi Lost"	Grace Kraft and Vi Nguyen	Haley Mancini and Jake Goldman	April 12, 2016	114	1.21
A lesson for Bubbles by Buttercup backfires when Pack Rat steals Octi. She later admits that she hid him to teach Bubbles a lesson of letting go.
9	9	"Strong Armed"	Patrick McEown, Leticia Abreu Silva, Alicia Chan, and Grace Kraft	Haley Mancini; Jake Goldman (additional)	April 13, 2016	105	1.17
Bubbles fights the villainous Pack Rat (from "Little Octi Lost") using her cybernetic cast covering a broken arm, which she calls Armsy. When she learns that Armsy has unique properties of its own, she becomes obsessed with it and begins to rely on it frequently.
10	10	"Power Up Puff"	Roque Ballesteros, Kenn Navarro, Udomphorn Rau, Corrine Wong, Clara Yan, and Joshua Zinman	Gina Ippolito, Haley Mancini, and Jake Goldman	April 14, 2016	109	1.03
Buttercup and Bubbles "level up" during a fight and develop the ability to create solid energy constructs (bright blue for Bubbles, and bright green for Buttercup) in any shape or form they wish. As she loses patience in a battle, Blossom fully taps into her own abilities and develops the power to create bright pink energy constructs that unusually take on the shape of regular household items.
11	11	"Tiara Trouble"	Julia Vickerman and Diego Molano	Haley Mancini and Jake Goldman	April 15, 2016	107	1.18
The Mayor hosts a beauty pageant, and Mojo Jojo, The Gangreen Gang, Fuzzy Lumpkins, Princess and Bubbles participate to win a mysterious tiara that is actually cursed by Him. Bubbles succeeds in using her high-frequency singing voice to shatter the tiara when it possesses Princess.
12	12	"The Wrinklegruff Gals"	Andreas Schuster	Emily Brundige, Haley Mancini, and Jake Goldman	April 21, 2016	101	1.21
The Powerpuff Girls go to Pokey Oaks Kindergarten on the first day of school, and find out it's closed due to an earlier accident caused by Bubbles, so they get sent to an elementary school. Unfortunately, the big kids keep calling the girls babies due to their short height, so they ask the Professor to make a potion that ages them. And even worse, they consume too much of it and turn into old grannies. Note: This episode takes place before "Princess Buttercup".
13	13	"Arachno Romance"	Julia Vickerman and Diego Molano	Jake Goldman; Haley Mancini and Sergio Cilli (additionals)	April 28, 2016	116	1.32
The Powerpuff Girls try to split up the Professor and his girlfriend, who has a thing about spiders. But after the break-up and when Buttercup shows the Professor's ex-girlfriend a song he made for her, the ex-girlfriend's feelings of love transform her into a giant spider that goes on a rampage throughout Townsville.
14	14	"Puffdora's Box"	Jaydeep Hasrajani and Leticia Abreu Silva	Haley Mancini; Jake Goldman (additional)	May 5, 2016	117	1.02
Blossom unleashes evil spirits from an ancient, mystical chest with her spring cleaning, and when she says a sentence with the word "hopeless", a fairy-like being named Hope tells her that only a strange foreign sentence—which is "τα λέμε" ("ta léme", which means "See you!" in Greek)—can put the spirits back in the chest, but only if she agrees to do things her sisters' way.
15	15	"Blue Ribbon Blues"	Alicia Chan, Grace Kraft, and Heather Martinez	Haley Mancini and Jake Goldman	May 12, 2016	118	1.17
Blossom tries to impress a famous scientist at the school science fair. Meanwhile, Bubbles and Buttercup try to find a "ghost horse". Then, after Blossom reveals her latest creation, the scientist reveals that he's actually a centaur named Janitaur, and he uses the invention to turn everybody—including the girls—into half-animals.
16	16	"Frenemy"	Kyle Neswald and Benjamin P. Carow	Haley Mancini and Jake Goldman	May 19, 2016	119	1.15
The girls' befriend a new classmate named Jemmica. She seems cool, but is actually a thief taking advantage of the girls' abilities to steal a priceless artifact of great power. The "best-friends-forever (BFF) necklaces" she gave them actually give her control over them.
17	17	"Once Upon a Townsville"	Kyle Neswald and Benjamin P. Carow	Haley Mancini; Jake Goldman (additional)	May 26, 2016	124	1.26
From a storybook universe, Princess Bluebell tries to meet her Prince Charming but keeps ending up putting her life in danger; especially when she ends up in the modern-day era of Townsville.
18	18	"Man Up 2: Still Man-ing"	Jaydeep Hasrajani and Leticia Abreu Silva	Jake Goldman; Haley Mancini (additional)	May 30, 2016	126	1.20
Man-Boy returns, stealing all of Townsville's water to fuel his lawn. A distracted Buttercup misses the fight and has to rescue her sisters alone and toughen up more if she wants to beat Man Boy again.
19	19	"Viral Spiral"	Julia Vickerman and Diego Molano	Haley Mancini; Jake Goldman (additional)	June 9, 2016	125	1.35
The Amoeba Boys—with the help from a mysterious cybernetic villain named Silico—hack themselves into the Internet and try to take it down in another bid to make a name for themselves, so it's up to Bubbles to upload her sisters into the Internet to stop them.
20	20	"Bubbles of the Opera"	Julia Vickerman and Diego Molano	Haley Mancini; Jake Goldman (additional)	June 16, 2016	120	1.37
After a series of mishaps that end up ruining her appearance (a botched picture day photo and botched haircut both courtesy of a dim-witted lunchlady, an allergic reaction to recalled makeup and a collision with a ceiling fan), Bubbles turns against her sisters and joins forces with Mojo Jojo; thus calling herself "Dark Bubbles".
21	21	"Sister Sitter"	Jaydeep Hasrajani and Leticia Abreu Silva	Jake Goldman; Haley Mancini (additional)	June 23, 2016	121	1.36
Blossom and Bubbles come down with a case of spotted piglet fever, so the Professor gives them a combination of an antidote and a song. He then leaves Buttercup in charge of them, but her prevention from giving them the antidote/song combination causes Blossom and Bubbles to transform into giant warthogs. Eventually, Buttercup finally gives them the antidote/song combination, causing them to revert to normal.
22	22	"Odd Bubbles Out"	Julia Vickerman and Diego Molano	Jake Goldman; Haley Mancini (additional)	September 1, 2016	134	0.95
Donny (from "Horn, Sweet Horn") stays with the girls for a week as part of a student exchange program, but at school, he starts hanging out with a girl named Chelsea, much to Bubbles' jealousy. But after Bubbles bends Donny's spoon in front of him and he runs out of the house, the girls find out that Chelsea lives in a volcano, which is actually Mojo Jojo's lair. They go there and see that Chelsea is actually a robot, engaging each other into a fight, and also see that Donny's magic is being drained for Mojo's death ray.
23	23	"Presidential Punchout"	Julia Vickerman and Diego Molano	Haley Mancini and Jake Goldman	September 8, 2016	129	1.08
When Princess Morbucks enters the Student Body President race, a determined Blossom sinks to her level to secure a win-win for herself.
24	24	"Cheep Thrills"	Hilary Florido and Vi Nguyen	Haley Mancini and Jake Goldman	September 15, 2016	122	0.82
Bubbles takes home a new pet, despite her sisters' warnings.
25	25	"Fashion Forward"	Alicia Chan and Grace Kraft	Jake Goldman; Haley Mancini (additional)	September 19, 2016	123	0.88
When the Fashionistas launch a new line of brainwashing clothing that Blossom falls under the control of, it's up to the Professor to stop the fashion trend before it's too late.
26	26	"In the Garden of Good and Eddie"	Alicia Chan and Grace Kraft	Haley Mancini; Jake Goldman (additional)	September 20, 2016 (Note: This episode was first released online on August 29, 2016.)	127	0.76
When the Powerpuff Girls try a quick-fix on their neglected vegetable garden, they are left with a giant, mooching and excessively clumsy tomato worm they must care for.
27	27	"Road Trippin'"	Kyle Neswald and Benjamin P. Carow	Jake Goldman; Haley Mancini (additional)	September 21, 2016 (Note: This episode was first released online on September 12, 2016.)	128	0.83
Bubbles realizes that she and the Professor do not have a lot in common. To correct this, she takes him on a father-daughter day road trip across the city. However, Bubbles soon becomes suspicious that the Professor intends to dump her. Meanwhile, Blossom and Buttercup deal with Schedulebot and Buttercup buries him alive.
28	28	"The Big Sleep"	Jaydeep Hasrajani and Leticia Abreu Silva	Jake Goldman; Haley Mancini (additional)	September 22, 2016 (Note: This episode was first released online on September 16, 2016.)	130	0.91
The Professor's new pillow invention comes alive and starts hunting him and the Girls. Despite their fright, the Powerpuff Girls have to stop this creepy monster-like invention before it escapes into the city.
29	29	"The Secret Life of Blossom Powerpuff"	Phil Allora, Scott Bern, Gleb Sanchez-Lobashov, and Corey Booth	Haley Mancini and Jake Goldman	September 23, 2016	131	0.79
When Blossom can't join her favorite school club, she imagines what her life would be like if she joined other clubs.
30	30	"Halt and Catch Silico"	Kyle Neswald and Benjamin P. Carow	Jake Goldman; Haley Mancini (additional)	October 8, 2016 (Note: This episode was first released online on September 23, 2016.)	137	0.98
When a series of negative articles about the Powerpuff Girls are posted on the Internet, the girls track them back to Silico.
31	31	"Secret Swapper of Doom"	Jaydeep Hasrajani and Leticia Abreu Silva	Jake Goldman; Haley Mancini (additional)	October 15, 2016	112	0.91
The Powerpuff Girls get a paper fortune teller and start predicting their futures by telling it secrets. Unfortunately, unknown to them it's another one of Him's plots, as they find out that all of the Professor's secrets will be exploited.
32	32	"Rainy Day"	Alicia Chan and Grace Kraft	Haley Mancini; Jake Goldman (additional)	October 22, 2016	132	0.81
Against the Professor's orders, Bubbles and Buttercup fight the rainy day blues by playing in the lab and end up with more than they bargained for when they accidentally turn Blossom into various "past versions" of herself through the Professor's time dasher.
33	33	"The Squashening"	Alicia Chan, Grace Kraft, and Scott Bern	Haley Mancini and Jake Goldman	October 27, 2016	140	0.90
A living "spaghetti squash" gourd captures the Powerpuff Girls on Halloween, and they must tell him a scary story in order to break free.
34	34	"Electric Buttercup"	Kyle Neswald and Benjamin P. Carow	Haley Mancini; Jake Goldman (additional)	November 28, 2016	133	0.84
The girls enter a battle of the bands contest, but Buttercup keeps smashing her guitars during band practice, when she goes to get her latest guitar fixed, the shop owner refuses to do so and Buttercup states she'll do anything for a new guitar.
35	35	"Professor Proofed"	Jaydeep Hasrajani and Leticia Abreu Silva	Jake Goldman; Haley Mancini (additional)	November 29, 2016	135	0.81
After an accident in the lab, the Powerpuff Girls become worried about the Professor's safety and seek to protect him from all of the potential dangers he could face.
36	36	"Poorbucks"	Alicia Chan and Grace Kraft	Haley Mancini and Jake Goldman	November 30, 2016	136	0.77
After Princess Morbucks goes broke, it is up to Blossom to change her ways. Will this be the start of a new friendship for the Powerpuff Girls and Morbucks?
37	37	"Snow Month"	Kyle Neswald and Benjamin P. Carow	Haley Mancini; Jake Goldman (additional)	December 1, 2016 (Note: This episode was first aired in the United Kingdom on June 8, 2016, and in France on July 19, 2016.)	115	0.94
Jared Shapiro, an admirer of Blossom, gives her a letter displaying his feelings for her. However, thanks to Bubbles and Buttercup's teasing, she becomes nervous in wanting to give an answer to him. When a snow day comes around the next day, Blossom decides to use her ice breath to extend it-
38	38	"Somewhere Over the Swingset"	Julia Vickerman and Diego Molano	Haley Mancini; Jake Goldman (additional)	December 2, 2016 (Note: This episode was first released online on November 24, 2016.)	138	0.86
A mysterious person comes to Townsville, challenging anyone who can be brave enough to try his swing set. Against the Professor's wishes, the Powerpuff Girls take up the challenge and swing so high that they end up in an alternate dimension where everything is perfect.
39	39	"People Pleaser"	Jaydeep Hasrajani and Leticia Abreu Silva	Jake Goldman and Haley Mancini	December 24, 2016 (Note: This episode was first released online on December 1, 2016.)	139	1.02
Blossom neglects her promise to Bubbles when she takes on too many tasks, leaving Buttercup and Bubbles to fend for themselves when Bubbles' biome project turns into a monster.

=== Season 2 (2017–18) ===
No. overall	No. in season	Title	Written and storyboarded by	Story by	Original release date	Prod. code	U.S. viewers (millions)
40	1	"The Last Donnycorn"	Kyle Neswald, Benjamin P. Carow, Julia Vickerman, and Cheyenne Curtis	Jake Goldman and Haley Mancini	March 3, 2017	155–156	0.95
When Donny the Unicorn is hunted by a seemingly unstoppable foe, the Powerpuff Girls have to find a way to save him before it's too late. Note: This is the first 22-minute episode of the reboot series.
41	2	"Green Wing"	Julia Vickerman and Cheyenne Curtis	Jake Goldman	March 10, 2017	147	0.82
While volunteering at a retirement home, Buttercup meets an old woman who claims she used to be a superheroine called Green Wing.
42	3	"15 Minutes of Fame"	Jaydeep Hasrajani and Leticia Abreu Silva	Haley Mancini	March 17, 2017	148	0.81
When Bubbles' video becomes viral, she does her best to keep its popularity.
43	4	"Splitsville"	Phil Jacobson, Sofia Alexander, and John West	Haley Mancini and Jake Goldman	March 24, 2017	149	0.79
The Powerpuff Girls learn to appreciate each others's style after having to each fight solo.
44	5	"Clawdad"	Alicia Chan and Grace Kraft	Jake Goldman and Haley Mancini	March 31, 2017	150	0.89
While visiting the lake, Buttercup vows to capture a legendary uncatchable crawdad.
45	6	"Super Sweet 6"	Julia Vickerman and Cheyenne Curtis	Haley Mancini and Jake Goldman	April 30, 2017	160	0.64
Princess Morbucks throws her sixth birthday party and being the only one not invited (and suspecting foul play), Blossom tries to keep Buttercup, Bubbles and the Professor at home so they won't go.
46	7	"A Star Is Blossom"	Julia Vickerman and Cheyenne Curtis	Jake Goldman	May 7, 2017	152	0.85
Blossom becomes jealous when Bubbles becomes the star of the school play.
47	8	"Mini Golf Madness"	Alicia Chan and Grace Kraft	Haley Mancini	May 21, 2017	154	0.68
Buttercup takes her game-winning at mini-golf ball too seriously, in spite of ominous warnings of dire consequences.
48	9	"Summer Bummer"	Alicia Chan and Grace Kraft	Corey Booth and Jake Goldman	May 28, 2017	158	0.88
At the beach, the Powerpuff Girls have a disagreement. Meanwhile, a team of sharks called the Bro Sharks arrive and the Powerpuff Girls eventually get challenged to a volleyball game which they must win to save the beach.
49	10	"The Tell Tale Schedulebot"	Jaydeep Hasrajani and Leticia Abreu Silva	Jake Goldman	June 4, 2017	157	0.82
After breaking and burying Schedulebot for being too annoying, following the events of "Road Trippin'", Blossom and Buttercup try not to tell the Professor while Bubbles investigates.
50	11	"Musclecup"	Kyle Neswald and Benjamin P. Carow	Haley Mancini	June 11, 2017	159	0.69
Feeling inadequate as a superhero, Buttercup bulks up.
51	12	"Take Your Kids to Dooms Day"	Jaydeep Hasrajani and Leticia Abreu Silva	Jake Goldman and Haley Mancini	June 18, 2017	165	0.66
The Powerpuff Girls spend the day with the Professor at his boring office, only to find that the office comes with a terrible secret.
52	13	"The Bubbles-Sitters Club"	Jaydeep Hasrajani and Leticia Abreu Silva	Jake Goldman and Haley Mancini	June 25, 2017	161	0.67
Bubbles tries to prove that she's responsible enough to own a dog.
53	14	"Buttercup vs. Math"	Jaydeep Hasrajani and Leticia Abreu Silva	Haley Mancini	July 2, 2017	153	0.58
When Buttercup tests into Honors Math, she tries to avoid being labeled a nerd.
54	15	"Home, Sweet Homesick"	Alicia Chan	Haley Mancini and Jake Goldman	July 9, 2017	162	0.63
When the girls go to camp, Blossom has a hard time leaving her schoolwork at home.
55	16	"Memory Lane of Pain"	Phil Jacobson, John West, and Andy Cung	Haley Mancini and Jake Goldman	July 16, 2017	163	0.52
While going through the Professor's scrapbook, Bubbles starts to question if she's ever been a hero.
56	17	"Spider Sense"	Phil Jacobson	Haley Mancini and Jake Goldman	July 23, 2017	166	0.59
When a monster ruins their relaxing vacation, the Powerpuff Girls run into a familiar face.
57	18	"Imagine That"	Kyle Neswald and Benjamin P. Carow	Jake Goldman	July 30, 2017	168	0.73
The Powerpuff Girls have to battle Him after he causes Bubbles' imagination to run wild.
58	19	"Phantasm Chasm"	Phil Jacobson and John West	Haley Mancini and Jake Goldman	August 20, 2017	170	0.74
After getting sucked into Jared's favorite board game, Buttercup is forced to team-up with him in order to save her sisters.
59	20	"Tooth or Consequences"	Alicia Chan and Caitlin Vanarsdale	Haley Mancini	August 27, 2017	171	0.88
Blossom gets a toothache one night, making her scared of the dentist. When Bubbles draws a smiley face on her toothache, Blossom gets tired. But as soon as the girls fall asleep, Blossom’s toothache turns green and gets bigger, turning her into a cactus-like monster. Blossom runs over Townsville, keeping everybody up all night. Professor takes her to the dentist, and as soon as Blossom’s toothache gets cured, she goes back to normal.
60	21	"Monkey Love"	Alicia Chan and Caitlin Vanarsdale	Haley Mancini	September 3, 2017	167	0.62
When Blossom makes a bad call, she becomes afraid to try again. Meanwhile, Mojo and Barbarus fall in love with each other even though Bianca does not accept.
61	22	"Bridezilla"	Jaydeep Hasrajani and Leticia Abreu Silva	Haley Mancini	September 10, 2017	169	0.43
Mojo and Barbarus announce their wedding, leading the Powerpuff Girls to suspect they are up to no good.
62	23	"Power of Four"	Alicia Chan, Grace Kraft, Kyle Neswald, Benjamin P. Carow, Julia Vickerman, Cheyenne Curtis, Jaydeep Hasrajani, and Leticia Abreu Silva	Haley Mancini and Jake Goldman	September 17, 2017	141	0.98
63	24	"Power of Four"	Alicia Chan, Grace Kraft, Kyle Neswald, Benjamin P. Carow, Julia Vickerman, Cheyenne Curtis, Jaydeep Hasrajani, and Leticia Abreu Silva	Haley Mancini and Jake Goldman	September 17, 2017	142	0.98
64	25	"Power of Four"	Alicia Chan, Grace Kraft, Kyle Neswald, Benjamin P. Carow, Julia Vickerman, Cheyenne Curtis, Jaydeep Hasrajani, and Leticia Abreu Silva	Haley Mancini and Jake Goldman	September 17, 2017	143	0.98
65	26	"Power of Four"	Alicia Chan, Grace Kraft, Kyle Neswald, Benjamin P. Carow, Julia Vickerman, Cheyenne Curtis, Jaydeep Hasrajani, and Leticia Abreu Silva	Haley Mancini and Jake Goldman	September 17, 2017	144	0.98
66	27	"Power of Four"	Alicia Chan, Grace Kraft, Kyle Neswald, Benjamin P. Carow, Julia Vickerman, Cheyenne Curtis, Jaydeep Hasrajani, and Leticia Abreu Silva	Haley Mancini and Jake Goldman	September 17, 2017	145	0.98
Part One – Find Your Bliss: Getting ready for the new Space Tow Truck movie, Bubbles keeps explaining to Blossom and Buttercup that Bliss exists, the two don’t seem to believe her though. At the theaters, an old-timey character breaks through the screen and the Powerpuff Girls prepare to fight him. Eventually after calling her multiple times, Bliss finally appears and defeats the villain, but the Professor, deeming her too dangerous, stuns her and knocks her out. Part Two – Bliss Reminisce: Bliss' backstory is revealed, by the Professor, Bliss herself and even Mojo Jojo. Part Three – Blisster Sister: When Bliss can't control her powers, the Powerpuff Girls must help her, whilst dealing with repeated attacks from the Gnat. Part Four – Breaking Bliss: When the Professor thinks Bliss is not ready to fight crime, she must prove it by doing with the Powerpuff Girls; they are unaware that Mee (Bliss' pet elephant) is actually Him in disguise, wanting something bad to happen so that he can merge with Bliss and use her powers for his own ends. Part Five – Blisstersweet Symphony: With Bliss possessed by Him, the Powerpuff Girls must save Bliss and stop Him once and for all before he splits Townsville and the Earth in two. Note: This is the series' first one hour TV movie event. Guest star: Bliss is played by Olivia Olson in the North American version, Toya Delazy in the African version, Alesha Dixon in the UK and Ireland version, and Wengie in the Australian version.
67	28	"Midnight at the Mayor's Mansion"	John West and Angela Zhang	Haley Mancini and Jake Goldman	October 29, 2017	180	0.72
When the Mayor's mansion is stalked by a vicious monster, the Powerpuff Girls must step in to help.
68	29	"You're a Good Man, Mojo Jojo"	Kyle Neswald and Benjamin P. Carow	Haley Mancini and Jake Goldman	December 3, 2017 (Note: This episode was first aired in Central and Eastern Europe and Germany on May 26, Poland on June 2, Portugal on June 10, Italy on September 14, Spain on September 25, and Southeast Asia on December 2, 2017.)	151	0.64
On Generic Tree Lighting Day (Christmas), Mojo upsets a puppy orphanage by stealing their karaoke machine, but then when he gets home he falls asleep and has a dream that he is visited by the ghost forms of Blossom, Bubbles and Buttercup, A Christmas Carol-style.
69	30	"The Trouble with Bubbles"	Kyle Neswald and Benjamin P. Carow	Haley Mancini	December 3, 2017 (Note: This episode was first aired in Central and Eastern Europe on September 6, Southeast Asia on September 10, Germany on September 28, Poland on October 5, Portugal on October 7, Spain on October 15, and Turkey on November 8, 2017.)	164	0.64
When Bubbles is overworked, she uses her coding skills to come up with a new solution.
70	31	"Sugar, Spice and Super Lice"	Jaydeep Hasrajani and Leticia Abreu Silva	Haley Mancini	April 15, 2018 (Note: This episode was first aired in Australia, New Zealand, and the Philippines on September 24, Germany on December 6, Turkey on December 14, Poland on December 21, Central and Eastern Europe on December 22, Portugal on December 23, Spain on December 30, 2017 and in Italy on January 6, 2018. It was released online in the United States on March 30, 2018.)	173	0.65
When Buttercup gets super lice, her sisters must battle them to save her.
71	32	"The Buttercup Job"	John West and Angela Zhang	Jake Goldman	April 15, 2018 (Note: This episode first aired in Australia, New Zealand, and the Philippines on September 24, 2017. It was released online in the United States on March 30, 2018. It aired in the UK and Ireland on April 13, 2018.)	174	0.65
Buttercup joins Jemmica in a quest for adventure.
72	33	"A Slight Hiccup"	Alicia Chan and Caitlin Vanarsdale	Haley Mancini	April 22, 2018 (Note: This episode was first released online in the United States on December 1, 2017 and aired in Australia, New Zealand, and Southeast Asia on December 6, 2017. It will air in the UK and Ireland on April 20, 2018.)	175	0.45
The Powerpuff Girls must overcome their turbo hiccups to stop the Gnat's latest evil plan.
73	34	"Toy Ploy"	Jaydeep Hasrajani and Leticia Abreu Silva	Haley Mancini and Jake Goldman	April 22, 2018 (Note: This episode first aired in Australia, New Zealand, and Southeast Asia on December 8, 2017. It was released online in the United States on March 30, 2018.)	177	0.45
When Mojo kidnaps the Powerpuff Girls' favorite snuggle toys, he gets more than he bargained for.
74	35	"Derby Dollies"	Kyle Neswald and Benjamin P. Carow	Jake Goldman	April 29, 2018 (Note: This episode first aired in Australia, New Zealand, and Southeast Asia on December 12, 2017. It was released online in the United States on April 27, 2018.)	179	0.44
When Bubbles joins the Derbytantes, Buttercup finds herself on the sidelines.
75	36	"Bubbles the Blue"	Caitlin Vanarsdale and Angela Zhang	Haley Mancini	April 29, 2018 (Note: This episode first aired in Australia, New Zealand, and Southeast Asia on December 13, 2017. It was released online in the United States on April 27, 2018.)	181	0.44
When Bubbles isn't her normal, bubbly self, her sisters don't know how to handle it.
76	37	"Deb O'Nair"	Jaydeep Hasrajani and Leticia Abreu Silva	Haley Mancini	May 6, 2018 (Note: This episode first aired in Australia, New Zealand, and Southeast Asia on December 11, 2017. It was released online in the United States on April 27, 2018.)	178	0.51
A classy queen of etiquette makes the Utoniums question their superhero way of life.
77	38	"Man Up 3: The Good, the Bad, and the Manly"	Kyle Neswald and Benjamin P. Carow	Haley Mancini	May 6, 2018 (Note: This episode first aired in Australia, New Zealand, and Southeast Asia on December 5, 2017 and the UK and Ireland on April 6, 2018. It was released online in the United States on April 27, 2018.)	172	0.47
After Bubbles gets blasted with Man Boy's beard ray, she wreaks havoc in the most manly and adorable way possible.
78	39	"The Blossom Files"	Caitlin Vanarsdale and Angela Zhang	Haley Mancini	May 13, 2018 (Note: This episode first aired in Australia, New Zealand, and Southeast Asia on December 14, 2017. It was released online in the United States on April 27, 2018.)	182	0.39
Blossom's skepticism is put to the test when she believes she's encountered a space alien.
79	40	"Not So Secret Service"	Kyle Neswald and Benjamin P. Carow	Jake Goldman	May 13, 2018 (Note: This episode first aired in Australia, New Zealand, and Southeast Asia on December 7, 2017, Poland on March 23, 2018 and in the UK and Ireland on April 27, 2018.)	176	0.41
After Mojo Jojo's latest creation threatens to blast him into tiny bits, the Powerpuff Girls are forced to take Mojo in.

=== Season 3 (2018–19) ===
No. overall	No. in season	Title	Written and storyboarded by	Story by	Original release date	Prod. code	U.S. viewers (millions)
80	1	"Never Been Blissed"	John West, Angela Zhang, Alicia Chan, and Caitlin Vanarsdale	Jake Goldman and Haley Mancini	April 8, 2018 (Note: This episode was first released online on March 30, 2018.)	183–184	0.56
Bliss is back from outer space with word to the Powerpuff Girls and the Professor that Sporde, an alien outlaw, has crash landed in Townsville. At school, the Powerpuff Girls and Bliss hunt for the alien. Bliss runs into a boy named Logan who is an officer from an intergalactic task squad called the Universal Protection Bureau which is also hunting Sporde. The two hit it off and are falling in love. But is everything what it seems? Note: This episode premiered during Season 2's run. Guest star: Olivia Olson as Bliss.
81	2	"Aliver"	Benjamin P. Carow and Caitlin Vanarsdale	Haley Mancini	May 13, 2018 (Note: This episode was released first online on April 27, 2018.)	188	0.41
The Powerpuff Girls compete for the title of World's Greatest Superheroes!
82	3	"Worship"	John West and Angela Zhang	Haley Mancini and Jake Goldman	May 20, 2018	191	0.41
When the Fashionistas unveil their new mind controlling perfume, the Powerpuff Girls must find a way to stop them before Townsville falls under their spell.
83	4	"Blossom3"	Benjamin P. Carow and Caitlin Vanarsdale	Jake Goldman	May 20, 2018	192	0.41
After being blasted by Duplikate, Blossom turns into a triple threat.
84	5	"Mojo the Great"	John West and Angela Zhang	Jake Goldman	May 20, 2018	187	0.41
In an effort to make himself "great," Mojo steals the powers that make each of the Powerpuff Girls the heroes they are.
85	6	"Trouble Clef"	Kyle Neswald and Jaydeep Hasrajani	Haley Mancini	June 3, 2018	193	0.55
When Morbucks realizes that the Powerpuff Girls see her as a villain and not a friend, she sets out to turn the town against them.
86	7	"Save the Date"	Leticia Abreu Silva and John Martinez	Haley Mancini	June 3, 2018	194	0.55
Ms. Keane is nervous about a first date.
87	8	"Can't Buy Love"	Benjamin P. Carow and Caitlin Vanarsdale	Jake Goldman	June 9, 2018	196	0.42
When Morbucks falls in love, she finds the first thing money can't buy.
88	9	"Largo"	Kyle Neswald and Jaydeep Hasrajani	Jake Goldman	June 9, 2018	197	0.42
When a mysterious rain cloud plagues Townsville, Bubbles learns things aren't what they seem.
89	10	"Blundercup"	Leticia Abreu Silva and John Martinez	Haley Mancini	June 16, 2018	198	0.51
Buttercup is knocked off-kilter by a mysterious force.
90	11	"Ragnarock and Roll"	John West and Angela Zhang	Jake Goldman	June 16, 2018	203	0.51
When an ancient prophecy spells doom for Townsville, the Powerpuff Girls must race to stop it.
91	12	"Total Eclipse of the Kart"	Kyle Neswald, Leticia Abreu Silva, Jaydeep Hasrajani, and John Martinez	Haley Mancini and Jake Goldman	August 12, 2018	185–186	0.36
The Powerpuff Girls compete in a race against some of their most vicious villains, to win whatever is in the Mayor's "Mysterious Box Of Mystery"; something that may reveal the awful truth about Jemmica.: Note: This is a double-length episode.
92	13	"The Long Skate Home"	Kyle Neswald and Jaydeep Hasrajani	Jake Goldman	August 19, 2018 (Note: This episode first aired in the UK and Ireland on July 13, 2018.)	189	0.43
After they get accused of a crime they didn't commit, the Powerpuff Girls and the Derbytantes have to find a way to clear their name! But Blossom feels the "Deathball way" isn't the way to do it.
93	14	"Quarantine"	John West and Angela Zhang	Jake Goldman and Haley Mancini	August 19, 2018	195	0.43
After a chemical spill, the Powerpuff Girls and Mojo find themselves trapped together.
94	15	"In the Doghouse"	Kyle Neswald and Jaydeep Hasrajani	Jake Goldman	August 26, 2018	205	0.38
After talking to Bliss, who's still out in space, Buttercup claims she could likewise go into space to help fight aliens. Blossom claims otherwise and the two get into a bet on if Buttercup can do so. However, Buttercup's departure comes at a bad time when Pug Faced Pauly decides to use the Utonium household to lay low from the cops.
95	16	"Salamander"	Leticia Abreu Silva and John Martinez	Haley Mancini	August 26, 2018	206	0.38
When the Professor is kidnapped, the Powerpuff Girls must go to a mysterious island to save him.
96	17	"Small World"	John West, Angela Zhang, Benjamin P. Carow, Caitlin Vanarsdale, Leticia Abreu Silva, John Martinez, Kyle Neswald, and Jaydeep Hasrajani	Jake Goldman and Haley Mancini	September 2, 2018	199	0.34
97	18	"Small World"	John West, Angela Zhang, Benjamin P. Carow, Caitlin Vanarsdale, Leticia Abreu Silva, John Martinez, Kyle Neswald, and Jaydeep Hasrajani	Jake Goldman and Haley Mancini	September 2, 2018	200	0.34
98	19	"Small World"	John West, Angela Zhang, Benjamin P. Carow, Caitlin Vanarsdale, Leticia Abreu Silva, John Martinez, Kyle Neswald, and Jaydeep Hasrajani	Jake Goldman and Haley Mancini	September 2, 2018	201	0.34
99	20	"Small World"	John West, Angela Zhang, Benjamin P. Carow, Caitlin Vanarsdale, Leticia Abreu Silva, John Martinez, Kyle Neswald, and Jaydeep Hasrajani	Jake Goldman and Haley Mancini	September 2, 2018	202	0.34
Part One: Abra-Disaster: After defeating Mojo, Fuzzy, The Amoeba Boys, Pug-Faced Paulie and The Gnat for the umpteenth time, the Powerpuff Girls are confident they are unstoppable. Part Two: Stone Cold Spider: With Townsville in peril, the Powerpuff Girls are sent to the arctic on a dangerous mission to find the key to saving the day. Part Three: Maze Daze: The Powerpuff Girls must enter a cursed jungle temple to obtain the last Heart Stone. Meanwhile, when Bubbles gets separated from her sisters, she tries to act more like them. Part Four: Heart to Heartstone: In the stunning conclusion, the Powerpuff Girls learn that Lester Van Luster has one more trick up his sleeve. Fortunately, they learn that they had the ability to defeat him all along. Guest Star: Dwight Schultz as Lester Van Luster
100	21	"Witch's Crew"	John West and Angela Zhang	Haley Mancini and Jake Goldman	October 21, 2018	207	0.47
On Halloween night, Morbucks summons a monster that she didn't expect.
101	22	"The Gift"	John Martinez and Andy Cung	Haley Mancini and Jake Goldman	December 16, 2018	210	0.40
The Powerpuff Girls must replace the Professor's Christmas present on Christmas Eve.
102	23	"Oh, Daisy!"	Leticia Abreu Silva and John Martinez	Haley Mancini	March 17, 2019 (Note: This episode first aired in the UK and Ireland on July 20, 2018.)	190	0.39
Buttercup is not a fan of Bubbles' newly created digital assistant, but must help her sisters in stopping Daisy when an attempt at reprogramming it causes it to go completely mad.
103	24	"Brain Freeze"	John West and Angela Zhang	Haley Mancini	March 17, 2019	211	0.39
When a mysterious new ice cream flavor takes Townsville by storm, the Powerpuff Girls suspect there might be foul play.
104	25	"Lights Out!"	John West and Angela Zhang	Haley Mancini	March 24, 2019	219	0.35
It's Townstopia day in Townsville and Bliss has taken time off from her space duties to join the festivities and show off her device that she calls Bugley, which can make anything a person asks for. However, they soon turn out to be for wicked purposes! Guest star: Bliss is played by Olivia Olson in the North American version, Toya Delazy in the African version, Alesha Dixon in the UK and Ireland version, and Wengie in the Australian version.
105	26	"Bucketboy!"	Benjamin P. Carow and Caitlin Vanarsdale	Haley Mancini	March 24, 2019 (Note: This episode first aired in Australia and New Zealand on September 28, 2018.)	204	0.35
When The Powerpuff Girls tell Barry that he's a hero, he takes it way too far!
106	27	"The Fog"	Benjamin P. Carow and Caitlin Vanarsdale	Jake Goldman and Haley Mancini	March 31, 2019	208	0.37
A new villain arrives in Townsville and gives the old villains an enticing offer.
107	28	"The Spoon"	Kyle Neswald and Jaydeep Hasrajani	Jake Goldman	March 31, 2019	209	0.37
A crash landing sends Townsville over the edge.
108	29	"Cat Burglar"	Benjamin P. Carow and Caitlin Vanarsdale	Haley Mancini	April 7, 2019	212	0.39
An alarmingly familiar cat burglar terrorizes Townsville.
109	30	"Hustlecup"	Kyle Neswald and Jaydeep Hasrajani	Jake Goldman	April 7, 2019	213	0.39
When Buttercup loses the Professor's latest invention, she'll have to beat The Gangreen Gang at their own game to get it back.
110	31	"Rebel Rebel"	John Martinez and Andy Cung	Haley Mancini	April 14, 2019	214	0.33
The Professor makes new friends, but they might be the wrong crowd for him.
111	32	"Our Brand is Chaos"	John West and Angela Zhang	Jake Goldman	April 14, 2019	215	0.33
Bubbles and Buttercup make a deal without realizing the consequences.
112	33	"Tagalong"	Benjamin P. Carow and Caitlin Vanarsdale	Haley Mancini	April 21, 2019	216	0.26
Buttercup is tired of Bubbles following her everywhere.
113	34	"BrainLord"	John Martinez and Andy Cung	Jake Goldman	April 21, 2019	218	0.26
A new superhero arrives in Townsville with a dark secret.
114	35	"Checkin' Out!"	Benjamin P. Carow and Caitlin Vanarsdale	Jake Goldman and Haley Mancini	April 28, 2019	220	0.24
A trip to the supermarket has bizarre consequences.
115	36	"Drama Bomb"	Alicia Chan and John West	Haley Mancini	April 28, 2019	221	0.24
The school play goes off the rails when the drama teacher interferes.
116	37	"Watch It!"	Alicia Chan and John West	Haley Mancini and Jake Goldman	May 5, 2019	222	0.35
The Powerpuff Girls are tasked with keeping a priceless gem safe from thieves.
117	38	"Man Up 4: The Donnyest Game"	Alicia Chan	Jake Goldman	May 5, 2019	224	0.33
With Manboy on the loose, Donny must be prepared for anything.
118	39	"The Oct-Father"	Alicia Chan	Jake Goldman and Haley Mancini	June 16, 2019	223	0.31
When Princess Morbucks steals Octi, Bubbles' reaction surprises everyone, even her sisters.
119	40	"Sideline Dad"	Kyle Neswald and Jaydeep Hasrajani	Jake Goldman	June 16, 2019	217	0.31
When The Powerpuff Girls play soccer, the Professor goes overboard.

== Shorts ==
=== Season 1 (2016) ===
All five digital shorts combined make up the production code of "113".

No.	Title	Original release date	Prod. code
1	"Who's Got the Power?"	February 15, 2016	113E
An extended version of the new theme song, including a retelling of the girls' origins.
2	"Air Buttercup"	March 1, 2016	113A
Buttercup tries to shoot her garbage in the trash basketball style, but keeps failing.
3	"Bubbles' Beauty Blog... but on Video"	March 8, 2016	113D
Bubbles tries to make a beauty vlog, but Buttercup and Blossom keep getting in the way.
4	"Run Blossom Run"	March 15, 2016	113B
Blossom tries to rush to school, but faces many obstacles along the way.
5	"Ping Pong Z"	June 24, 2016	113C
To decide who gets to do the dishes, the Powerpuff Girls challenge each other to a game of ping pong.

=== Season 2 (2017) ===
No.	Title	Original release date	Prod. code
6	"Bubbs & Donny Get the Mail"	March 3, 2017	146D
Bubbles and Donny are asked by the Professor to get the mail, and they think it's a mission.
7	"Bedtime"	September 18, 2017	146A
The Powerpuff Girls need to get a good night's rest before family photo day, but they just can't seem to fall asleep!
8	"Mojo Builds a Shelf"	September 18, 2017	146B
Mojo discovers the only thing more difficult than total world domination is DIY furniture!
9	"I'll Be Bake"	September 18, 2017	146C
Bubbles and Buttercup's good intentions are bad news for the cake Blossom is trying to bake.
10	"Blissfully Unaware"	September 18, 2017	146E
Bliss uses her telekinetic powers to help the Professor make a delicious dinner. Note: This is the only short that Bliss appears in.

== Crossover special (2016) ==
Title	Directed by	Written by	Storyboarded by	Original air date	U.S. viewers (millions)
"TTG v PPG"	Peter Rida Michail	Emily Brundige	Noel Belknap, Sean Kreiner, Casey Leonard, and Dave Stone	June 30, 2016	2.42
After using a repellent to temporarily hinder Blossom, Bubbles, and Buttercup, Mojo Jojo uses a teleportation device to teleport himself to Jump City in the Teen Titans Go! universe. There, he recruits Beast Boy and Cyborg to help him build his monkey army. The girls try to follow him, only to run into Raven, Starfire, and Robin. The Titans then proceed to rope the girls into a contest to see who's the better team, with stopping Mojo as the goal. Note: This episode is a crossover with the Teen Titans Go! animated series. Note: This episode was produced by Warner Bros. Animation, making it the first episode produced by a studio other than Cartoon Network Studios since the 1998 Powerpuff Girls series episode "Superfriends".
