= Toya Delazy =

South African singer

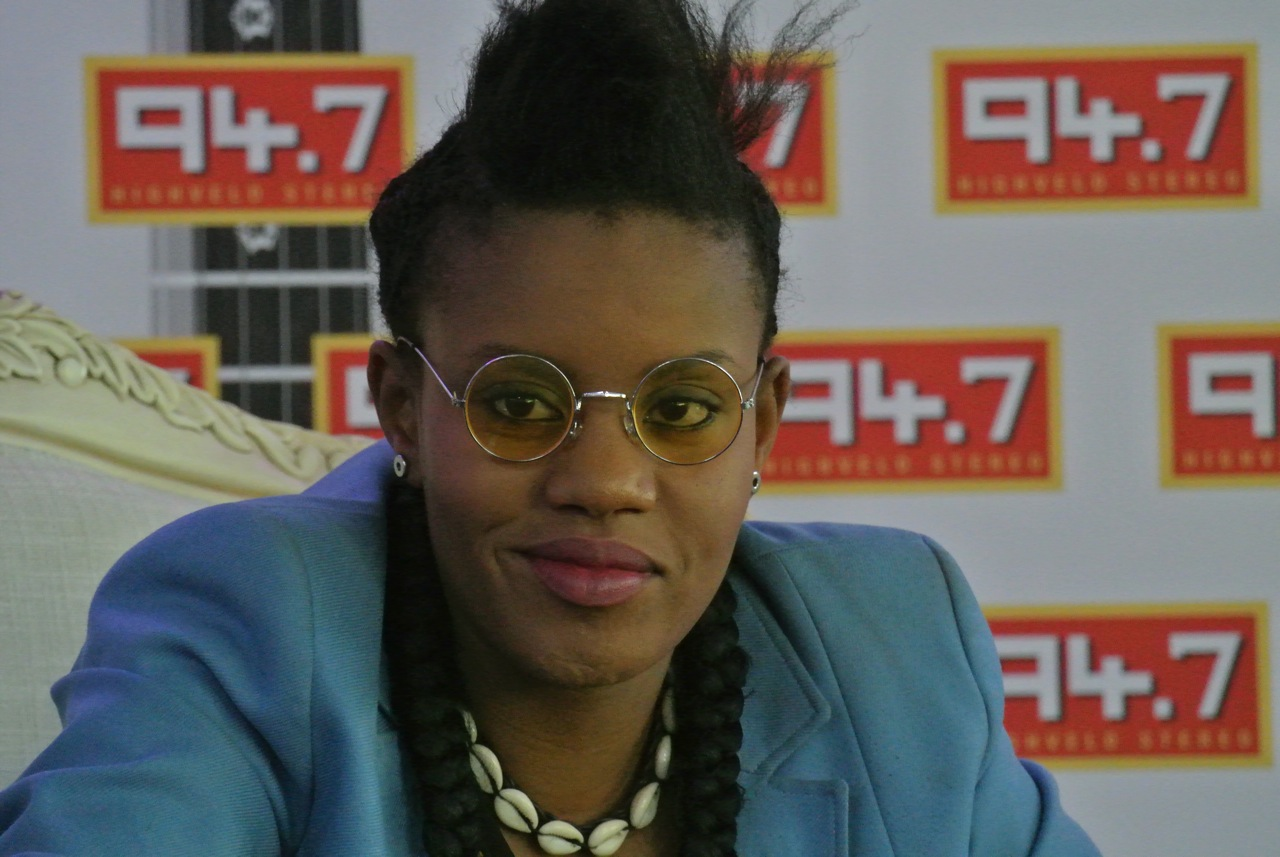
- Delazy in 2012

Background information
- Born: Latoya Nontokozo Buthelezi eMahlabathini, KwaZulu-Natal, South Africa
- Origin: Durban, South Africa
- Genres: Afro rave; electronic; jazz; hip hop
- Occupations: Singer; producer; pianist; dancer; performer
- Instruments: Vocals; synth; piano
- Years active: 2011–present
- Labels: Delazy Entertainment; SME Africa (former)
- Website: delazy.com

Latoya Nontokozo Buthelezi, who is known professionally as Toya Delazy, is a London-based South African singer, producer, pianist, dancer and performer from KwaZulu-Natal. She is known for her music genre called Afro rave, which fuses techno, drum, bass, and beats with Zulu lyricism. Delazy was nominated for Best International Act (Africa) at the 2013 BET Awards. Her debut studio album, Due Drop, was supported by the singles "Pump It On", "Love Is in the Air", "Are You Gonna Stay?", "Heart" and "Memoriam". Following the album's release, Delazy took home two awards at the 2013 SAMAs, including Newcomer of the Year.

== Biography and music career ==
=== Early life and career beginnings ===
Delazy was born in KwaZulu-Natal, South Africa. She is the granddaughter of Mangosuthu Buthelezi, a Zulu chief and anti-apartheid icon, and the great-granddaughter of Princess Magogo, a Zulu princess and traditional composer. She attended a convent hostel at the age of 6 and learned to recite the Hail Mary. When she was nine years old, she started playing classical piano and composing music. Delazy grew up in a religious setting and was raised by a single mother, who died in a car accident in 2008. In 2009, she matriculated from Domino Servite School. She played hockey for KwaZulu-Natal and won provincial awards for discus, but lost interest in both games after her mother's death. Delazy is a supporter of the Princess Mandisi Health Care Unit in Ulundi, a center that takes care of people with HIV/AIDS.

Delazy got her first major break while performing at a live show. Producer Markus Els approached her and invited her to record a few songs at a studio. A demo of the songs she recorded was given to Vusi Leeuw, who later presented it to Sony Music Africa. Delazy signed a two-album record deal with Sony Music Africa on 19 April 2011. She made her first solo appearance at the 2011 Africa Day concert in Newtown, Johannesburg, performing alongside Baaba Maal, Habib Koite and Tumi and the Volume, among others.

=== 2011–2018: Due Drop, Ascension, Jetlag and Uncommodified ===
In 2011, Delazy started working on her debut studio album, Due Drop, which was acclaimed by both music critics and fans. The album's music is a mixture of several genres, including electro hop, soul, jazz and a cappella. "Pump It On" was released as the album's lead single on 28 October 2011. Produced by Jax Van Heerden and Johnny De Ridder, the song received substantial airplay on 5FM and Metro FM. The music video for "Pump It On" was released on 15 November 2011, and was conceptualised and shot by Tristan Holmes of Star Productions. Delazy assisted the director with the creative aspects of the video. The music video for "Memoriam", which was filmed by Fausto Becatti and released in September 2013, shows an intimate side of Delazy. "Memoriam" was written in honour of one of her teachers who died in 2009, and is also reminiscent of her mother Princess Lethuxolo. In an interview posted on Between 10 and 5 in October 2013, Becatti said he fell in love with the song and was inspired to tell stories that would reverberate with people on a passionate level. On 25 February 2013, Sony Music Africa released the album's deluxe edition and the behind-the-scenes documentary film Takes a lot to make a Classic.

Delazy announced on Twitter that her second studio album, Ascension, would be released on 28 October 2014. "Forbidden Fruit" was released as the album's lead single on 22 September 2014. The song features a production collaboration with Craig Massiv of Flash Republic. OkayAfrica described the song as a "gospel-tipped cauldron of throbbing drums and jittery electronic spurts" and said it is "unquestionably one of Delazy’s most thrilling songs yet." Delazy relocated to London and started her own record label, Delazy Entertainment. On 28 March 2017, she released a 10-track mixtape titled Jetlag, which features collaborations with producers and guest artists such as WTF, Moonchild Sanelly, Dopeboy LDN, EW, Amin and Synesthetic. On Cartoon Network Africa's "Power of Four" one-hour special, Delazy voices the character Bliss. She previously performed an Africanized cover of the Powerpuff Girls extended theme song, which was uploaded to Cartoon Network Africa's official YouTube channel.

In December 2017, Delazy released her third studio album, Uncommodified, which comprises sixteen tracks and features guest appearances from Killason and Aaron Beezee. She describes the album as the third and final chapter of her musical trilogy and said it embodies her freedom as an artist and devotion to living her purpose and remaining true to herself. Inspired by sounds from Solomun, Black Coffee, Stormzy and Benjamin Clementine, the album is a fusion of jazz, electro and hip-hop. Delazy produced and co-produced four of the album's tracks and enlisted help from producer Wes My Meds and recording artists such as Silas Beats, Khwezi Sifunda, Kofski, Rob Smyls, Lawless Prod, Mantra and Rymez. The album's lead single, "Greatest", was produced by Ugandan producer Silas Beats. In addition to the lead single, the album contains the track "Khula Khula", a song that raises awareness about gender inequality in Africa.

=== 2019–present: Afro rave genre creation and Afrorave Vol. 1 ===
In 2019, Delazy created a genre called Afro rave, which she describes as "edgy Afropop". Afro rave is sometimes called Zulu rave and stylized as Afro Rave, Afrorave, or Afro-rave. In 2021, she released her fourth studio album, Afrorave Vol. 1, which features a collaboration with Young Mbazo. Her debut song to be labeled as Afro rave was the tune "Funani", which she wrote "to encourage people to be what they want".

== Endorsements and fashion style ==
Delazy was the brand ambassador for the Reebok Classics Drop R range between 2011 and 2012. In an interview with Youth Village, she said Reebok approached her and told her they admired her fashion flair, music and style. She represented the brand throughout Africa and had the creative power to certify her own classics. In addition to music, Delazy's love also extends to the fashion world. She believes that fashion expresses one's freedom and showcases their individualism. She has described her fashion style as classy and funky. Her fashion style includes street and vintage pieces. In April 2013, Legit Clothing stores in South Africa and Namibia launched a clothing line inspired by Delazy. The official launch was held at the Town Square Legit store in Windhoek. Delazy was also dressed by Suzaan Heyns, a well-known South African designer.

== Artistry ==
In 2019, Delazy created a genre called Afro rave, which she describes as "edgy Afropop". She previously described her sound as JEHP, an acronym for the fusion of jazz, electro hop, and punk (she swapped pop for punk in 2016). Her music draws from her daily life experiences. Delazy has been influenced by artists such as Kate Nash, John Legend, Radiohead, Tracy Chapman, Aṣa, Goldfish, Imogen Heap, Adele, Kings of Leon, Regina Spektor, John Lennon, Norah Jones, John Mayer, Black Eyed Peas, Sara Bareilles, Nirvana, Deadmau5 and Skrillex. Delazy's love for music was inspired by classical and orchestral songs like "Clair de Lune" and "Psalms of David". She was also inspired by Lauryn Hill after watching Sister Act.

== Discography ==
Studio albums

- Due Drop (2012)
- Ascension (2014)
- Uncommodified (2017)
- Afrorave Vol. 1 (2021)

Mixtapes

- Jetlag (2017)

== Filmography ==
=== Television ===
Year	Title	Role	Notes
2017–2019	The Powerpuff Girls	Blisstina Utonium	Episodes: "Power of Four", "Never Been Blissed", "In the Doghouse" and "Lights Out"; African version

== Awards and nominations ==
Year	Event	Prize	Recipient	Result	Ref
2014	African Muzik Magazine Awards	Best Female Southern Africa	Herself	Nominated	
2014	South African Music Awards	Music Video of the Year	"Memoriam"	Nominated	
2013	Metro FM Music Awards	Best Top 5 Produced Album	Due Drop Deluxe	Nominated	
2013	Metro FM Music Awards	Best Top 5 Female Album	Due Drop Deluxe	Nominated	
2013	Metro FM Music Awards	Best Top 5 Newcomer	Due Drop Deluxe	Nominated	
2013	Metro FM Music Awards	Top 5 Styled Artist/Group	Due Drop Deluxe	Nominated	
2013	South African Music Awards	Newcomer of the Year	Due Drop Deluxe	Won	
2013	South African Music Awards	Best Pop Album	Due Drop Deluxe	Won	
2013	South African Music Awards	Best Producer	Due Drop Deluxe	Won	
2013	South African Music Awards	Record of the Year	"Love is in the Air"	—N/a	
2013	South African Music Awards	Remix of the Year	"Heart (Pascal & Pearce Remix)"	Nominated	
2013	BET Awards	Best International Act: Africa	Herself	Nominated	
2022	Berlin Music Video Awards	Best Low Budget	FUNANI	Nominated	
