= Bliss (The Powerpuff Girls) =

Fictional character

- The Powerpuff Girls character
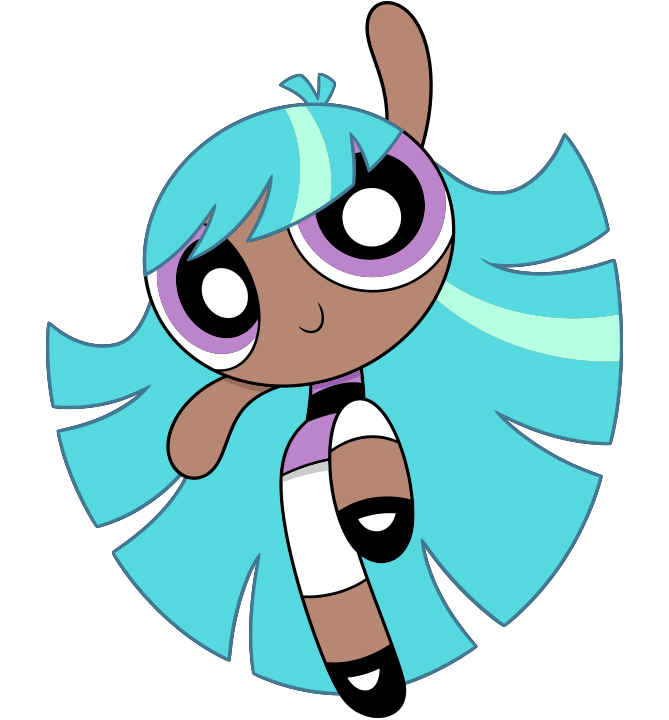
- First appearance: "The Power of Four, Part One – Find Your Bliss" (2017)
- Last appearance: "Lights Out!" (2019)
- Created by: Alicia Chan; Grace Kraft; Kyle Neswald; Benjamin P. Carow; Julia Vickerman; Cheyenne Curtis; Jaydeep Hasrajani; Leticia Abreu Silva; Haley Mancini; Jake Goldman
- Voiced by: Olivia Olson

In-universe information
- Full name: Blisstina Francesca Francia Mariam Alicia Utonium
- Nickname: Bliss
- Affiliation: The Powerpuff Girls
- Relatives: Professor Utonium (father); Blossom (sister); Bubbles (sister); Buttercup (sister)
- Nationality: American

Blisstina "Bliss" is a cartoon character created for the 2016 series The Powerpuff Girls. She made her first appearance in the five-part television film The Power of Four, which was released in 2017. The character was introduced as the older sister to the three original Powerpuff Girls, having been absent during all their lives because she ran away when she lost control of her powers. She is portrayed as a teenager, being much taller and having wider hips than the other Powerpuff Girls, and she also has darker skin. The character has been widely interpreted as being Black and to a lesser degree Hispanic. She is marketed as the fourth Powerpuff Girl and was met with mixed reactions from fans and critics.

== Creation ==
=== Design ===
Bliss is taller and has a more developed body than the three younger Powerpuff Girls, with brown skin that is shades darker than would be described as a common tan, light purple eyes, and cyan hair. Her dress is light purple to match her eyes, much like her three sisters with their own signature color. Since she is different from the other girls, her leggings do not reach all the way down to her feet, courtesy of her being wider and taller. She also has a dark blue plastic headband (a so-called "alice band") that none of the others wear, featuring a fuchsia pink heart.

=== Voice actors ===
The character had a total of five English voice actors for different regions and fifteen overall for the film's original airing.

In the American version, Olivia Olson, who is widely known as the voice of Marceline the Vampire Queen in Adventure Time, voiced the character. South African musician Toya Delazy who is one of the many actors voicing the character in different countries expressed that she was intrigued by the character and felt a connection to her due to their similar backgrounds, as Delazy explained that she too missed out on getting to know her three sisters due to being estranged from her father for many years. Alesha Dixon who voiced Bliss for the British version expressed that she was beyond excited about her role and loved voicing the character but that it was a hard job, explaining that this was due to the character's feisty personality and the fact that she had to do a lot of screaming while voicing her. She also stated that she watched the episode with her daughter Azura when it aired and that her daughter recognized her as the character. In the Arabic version the Fourth Powerpuff Girl is voiced by Nancy Ajram, a prominent Lebanese singer. In the French version, she is voiced by comedian Claudia Tagbo.

== Appearances ==
The first teaser image was released in September 2017, the image has shown Bliss from the back and in silhouette, but with her purple coloring visible. The character was first shown fully at the MCM London Comic Con on Friday, October 27, 2017. She debuted on the series in the first part of the five-part television movie The Power of Four, each part of the movie was named explicitly with a pun on the character's name, the first one being "Find Your Bliss", followed by "Bliss Reminisce", "Blisster Sister", "Breaking Bliss", and "Blisstersweet Symphony". All parts were aired on television as episodes of the series. The character returned in the episode "Never Been Blissed" in 2018 during the series' twentieth anniversary, and in the episode "Lights Out!".

Outside of animation she has been featured in merchandise such as headphones, cupcake toppers and several t-shirts.

== Powers and abilities ==
As a response to a rival's creation of the perfect little boy, Professor Utonium created Bliss out of sugar, spice, and everything nice; however, he accidentally used Chemical W (as opposed to the other Powerpuff Girls who were created with Chemical X) which gave Bliss unique psionic powers (telekinesis, short-range teleportation, and energy) that neither her sisters nor their original counterparts possess. Her unique abilities are difficult for her to control and she sometimes loses control of them when she feels any form of emotion.

== Reception ==
The character's initial announcement was met with negative reactions from some fans who expressed that the new character's marketing as "The fourth Powerpuff Girl" was inaccurate and ignored the previously introduced character of Bunny from the 1998 series, but when rumors began to spread that the character would be black, many fans began to express a more optimistic tone. The rumors began to emerge when it was announced that South African singer Toya Delazy would be providing the voice for the character. Louise Mccreesh of Digital Spy expressed that she believed that the character was a great step forward in terms of racial diversity. Gabriela Herstik of HelloGiggles stated that she saw that most fans were both equally excited and nervous at the announcement of the character, she also wrote that she personally felt that the character was a good addition.

Charles Pulliam-Moore of io9 stated that the character is different from the other temporary additions to the Powerpuff trio such as Bunny and Bullet the Squirrel, all who existed to teach the original girls moral lessons before they left the group to pursue their own destinies. While Bliss does not appear to him in that way, he expressed that he felt that the story of The Power of Four made him question whether the new reboot was a good idea in the first place. Moore stated that he felt that while he watched the movie that Bliss was meant to be a person of color, he stated:

The more you see Bliss go through the process of losing control of herself and then becoming a physical threat, the more glaringly apparent it becomes that, unlike her sisters, Bliss is coded as a person of color. Everything about Bliss is designed to set her apart from the three original Powerpuff Girls. One imagines it's to signal that she's a new kind of Powerpuff meant to be more reflective of the show's diverse audience. She's taller, has skin a shade of brown that's deeper than a tan, purple eyes, and electric blue hair. Bliss reads as distinctly non-white and decidedly multi-ethnic.

In Moore's opinion, the creation of Bliss was a means for the creators of the show to wink at the non-white audience that has watched the show for years and express their recognition of them as watchers. Despite this, he felt that he was disappointed in the fact that the first non-white Powerpuff girl had been introduced as an emotionally unstable time-bomb who is not capable of putting her feelings together properly to act as a regular superhero like the others. He stated that the portrayal of black and Latina women as hot-headed is a stereotype he is all too used to seeing in media. He finished his article with; "In a lot of ways, Bliss feels like a collection of well-intentioned afterthoughts that would have worked better earlier on in the series." Toya Delazy acknowledged the criticism of the character, and stated that she believed the negative reception had not been as major as the positive she had received, as well as that she did not think of the character as meaning to imply or enforce any harmful ideas about black women and that her own feelings on it simply was that it was a cartoon that did not need to necessarily be analyzed to that depth.

Kayla Sutton, a social media curator and the major contributor for the digital publication Black Girl Nerds, cried when the character was unveiled. Via email to The Daily Dot she said: "We don't get many black cartoon characters and when we do, we're just the comic relief". Danielle Ransom of The Daily Dot stated that she originally experienced excitement at the introduction of a Powerpuff girl with remarkably darker skin than the others, but when she viewed the film, she thought that the creators should have taken time to make a character that was more than what she felt was a caricature of an angry black girl, something which she reported had nonplussed many other fans. Paula Poindexter, who teaches media representation of African Americans at the University of Texas and saw it as a positive that there is a person of color in the series, expressed some concern about Bliss's characterization as an emotional teenager who cannot control herself to The Daily Dot as well. Poindexter stated that everything positive about the character got turned into a negative in the film and said that the character is little more than a token. Ransom concluded that Bliss seemed more like an attempt by the creators to hop on the diversity trend as opposed to a part of the black empowerment movement.
