= Amanda Leighton =

American actress (born 1993)

- Born: Amanda Moreno Leighton; June 7, 1993 (age 33); Fresno, California, U.S.
- Occupation: Actress
- Years active: 2005–present
- Spouse: Sage Northcutt (m. 2020)

Amanda Moreno Leighton (born June 7, 1993) is an American actress. She is known for her voice acting as Blossom in the 2016 Cartoon Network animated series The Powerpuff Girls, Poppy in the 2018 Netflix animated series Trolls: The Beat Goes On!, and Polly Plantar in the 2019 Disney Channel animated series Amphibia. She is also known for her recurring role as Emma in the Freeform drama series The Fosters.

== Personal life ==
Leighton grew up in Fresno, California and she graduated from Clovis West High School.

Leighton married professional mixed martial artist Sage Northcutt on December 5, 2020.

== Career ==
Leighton started her acting career at the age of 10 in her hometown, and got her first agent at the age of 12 when she started taking acting classes and going to auditions in Los Angeles. She also has 11 years of dance experience, which she used in ABC Family's Make It or Break It, where she played a gymnast named Wendy Capshaw. In June 2015, Leighton was cast to voice Blossom in Cartoon Network's revival of The Powerpuff Girls, which ran from 2016 to 2019.

Leighton's other appearances include roles on several television shows including Pretty Little Liars as Danielle, Grey's Anatomy as patient Sarah Cassidy with Treacher Collins syndrome, 90210 as Alex Scarborough, Criminal Minds as Trish Leake, and as a singing Cactus Kid in Six Feet Under. She recurred as Emma on the ABC Family/Freeform drama series The Fosters from 2014 to 2018. From 2017 to 2022, she recurred as young Sophie on the NBC television drama series This Is Us. Leighton voiced the regular roles of Poppy in the animated series Trolls: The Beat Goes On! which was released by Netflix between 2018 and 2019, and the pollywog Polly Plantar in the Disney Channel animated series Amphibia, which aired from 2019 to 2022. She costarred in the 2020 drama film Chance.

== Filmography ==
Television
Year	Title	Role	Notes
2005	Six Feet Under	Singing Cactus Kid	Episode: "The Silence"
2010	Criminal Minds	Trish Leake	Episode: "Risky Business"
2011	Grey's Anatomy	Sarah Cassidy	Episode: "Start Me Up"
2011	House	Young Elena	Episode: "You Must Remember This"
2011–2012	90210	Alex Scarborough	3 episodes
2011	Pretty Little Liars	Danielle	2 episodes
2012	Make It or Break It	Wendy Capshaw	Recurring role (season 3)
2013–2014	The Young and the Restless	Raven	6 episodes
2013	Kickin' It	Erica Straffman	Episode: "Jack Stands Alone"
2013	Austin & Ally	Bonnie	Episode: "Beach Bums & Bling"
2013	Filthy Sexy Teen$	Whitney	Episode: "Pilot"
2013	Sketchy	White Girl	Episode: "Oh Lordy 'White Girls'"
2014–2018	The Fosters	Emma Kurtzman	52 episodes
2014	Bones	Shawna	Episode: "The Purging of the Pundit"
2016–2019	The Powerpuff Girls	Blossom (voice)	Main role
2016	Teen Titans Go!	Blossom (voice)	Episode: "TTG v PPG"
2016	The Cheerleader Murders	Dee James	Television film
2016	Rosewood	Sophie Hornstock	2 episodes
2017–2022	This Is Us	Young Sophie Inman	Recurring role
2018–2019	Trolls: The Beat Goes On!	Poppy (voice)	Main role
2019–2022	Amphibia	Polly Plantar (voice)	Main role
2019	Good Trouble	Emma Kurtzman	Episode: "A Very Coterie Christmas"
2020–2022	Trolls: TrollsTopia	Poppy (voice)	Main role
2020–present	Solar Opposites	Stacy K. / Angela (voices)	5 episodes
2022, 2025–present	Chibiverse	Polly Plantar (voice)	3 episodes
2022, 2025–present	Chibiverse	Kristine Sanchez (voice)	Episode: "Chibivengers"
2022, 2025–present	Chibiverse	Addison Wells (voice)	Episode: "Love Boat Liars"
2023	The Rookie	Kyra Cook	Episode: "The Naked and the Dead"
2023–2024	Hailey's On It!	Kristine Sanchez (voice)	Recurring role
2024	How Not to Draw	Polly Plantar (voice)	Web series; episode: "Polly"

Film

Year	Title	Role	Notes
2012	Divorce Invitation	Young Alex	
2015	The Better Half	Emily Ryan	
2020	Chance	Brooke	
2023	Camp Hideout	Selena	

Video games

Year	Title	Role	Notes
2016	World of Final Fantasy	Reynn (voice)	
2017	Lego Dimensions	Blossom (voice)	
2018	Epic Seven	Karin / Helga / Lorina / Lidica (voices)	
