= Jax Panik =

South African Band

- Origin: Bellville, Western Cape, South Africa
- Genres: Pop; Rock; Synth-pop
- Years active: 2007–present
- Labels: Trax Panik; Sony Music Entertainment; Active Music Publishing
- Members: Hugo Chichava; Johannes Jacobus van Heerden; Johnny de Ridder; Theunis Uys; Deon van Zyl; Christopher Smith; Edward Cox; Steve; Jeremy Puren; Kailyn Johnson; Chris Beyrens; Ash Stephenson; Devan Swanepoel
- Website: jaxpanik.com

Jax Panik is a South African pop, rock and synth-pop musical band from Bellville, Western Cape, South Africa now relocated to Cape Town.

== History ==
Jax Panik was started as a parody. When the founding members, Jacobus van Heerden and Johnny de Ridder, wanted to create a mock pop star/group against all the traditional rock bands that ruled South Africa at that time. That's how Jax Panik was born.

Jax Panik was the guy who did things differently. Back then he refused to play live, only distributing music online, making use of fan content and using social media/networks to promote himself.

By 2007, the first album Cigarettes & Cinnamon was completed and in 2008 released independently in South Africa. Following the typical pop blueprint, 'oohs', 'aahs' and 'baby' can be heard throughout the album. Throughout 2008 tracks like Hit or Miss, Cigarettes & Cinnamon and Russian Roulette did well on regional and campus radio stations, even reaching poll spots on charts. Other noteworthy achievements during this period include an MTV Africa Viewer’s Choice Award nomination.

== I Am Jax Panik ==
2010 meant change for Jax Panik, and the release of the new full length album I Am Jax Panik. This is also the first year that Jax Panik played live, with 4 members and their masks.

=== The Mask ===
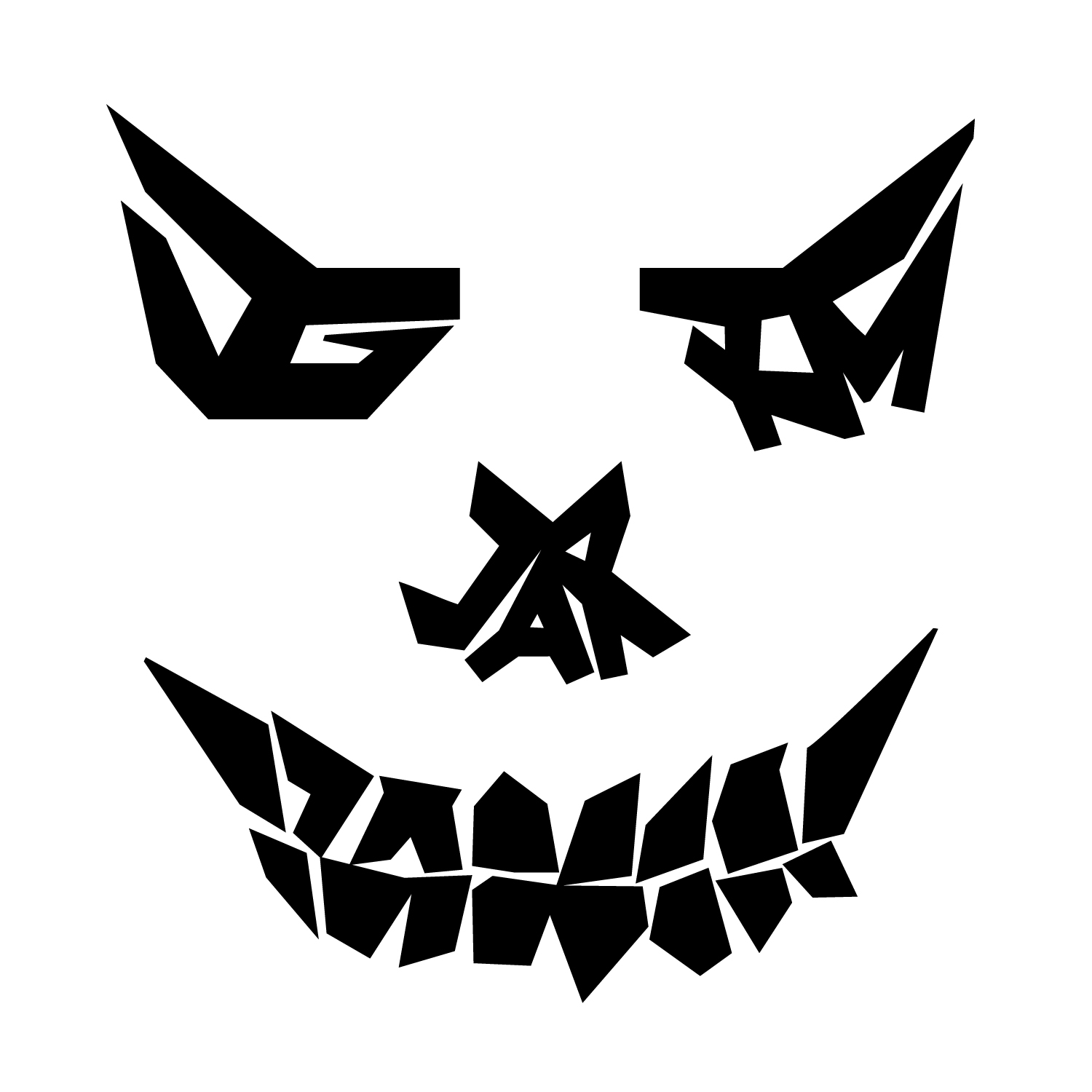
The mask was stylized to look like a face.

The mask was introduced to keep the face behind the mask a secret. Only because Jax Panik is a third person. One with many faces and guises. The mask is usually white with 'I Am Jax Panik' written in black and vice versa. In mid-2011 it was decided that only the Jax Panik DJ, Deon van Zyl, wears the mask at live performances.

== Discography ==
- Cigarette's and Cinnamon (2008)
- I Am Jax Panik (2010)
