= The Powerpuff Girls (2016 TV series) =

American animated television series

- Genre: Adventure; Slapstick; Action; Comedy; Slice of life; Animated sitcom; Superhero
- Based on: The Powerpuff Girls by Craig McCracken
- Developed by: Nick Jennings; Bob Boyle
- Directed by: Nick Jennings; Bob Boyle
- Voices of: Amanda Leighton; Kristen Li; Natalie Palamides; Olivia Olson; Tom Kane; Tom Kenny; Roger L. Jackson; Roger Craig Smith
- Narrated by: Tom Kenny
- Theme music composer: Tacocat
- Opening theme: "Who's Got the Power?" (performed by Tacocat)
- Ending theme: "The Powerpuff Girls" (lyrics and performed by Tristan Sedillo and Hannah Watanabe-Rocco)
- Composer: Mike Reagan
- Country of origin: United States
- Original language: English
- No. of seasons: 3
- No. of episodes: 119 (list of episodes)

Production
- Executive producers: Jennifer Pelphrey; Curtis Lelash; Brian A. Miller; Rob Sorcher; Nick Jennings
- Producer: Pernelle Hayes
- Running time: 11 minutes; 22 minutes (2-part episodes); 44 minutes (4-part episodes)
- Production company: Cartoon Network Studios

Original release
- Network: Cartoon Network
- Release: April 4, 2016 – June 16, 2019

Related
- The Powerpuff Girls (1998); Powerpuff Girls Z

The Powerpuff Girls is an American superhero animated sitcom developed by Nick Jennings and Bob Boyle for Cartoon Network. It is a reboot of the animated series of the same name created by Craig McCracken. It follows Blossom, Bubbles, and Buttercup, a trio of superpowered girls living in the city of Townsville who are frequently called upon by the townsfolk to protect its residents from evil. The girls were created in a lab by the scientist Professor Utonium, who sought to create the perfect little girls by using sugar, spice, and everything nice along with the accidental addition of the ingredient Chemical X, the source of the girls' superpowers.

It was first announced on June 16, 2014. A year later, it was announced that it would feature new voice actors for the main characters. The series premiered on April 4, 2016, and ended on June 16, 2019, lasting for three years.

The series was panned by critics, viewers, and longtime fans for its animation, writing, and deviations from its predecessor.

== Plot ==
The Powerpuff Girls features Blossom, Bubbles, and Buttercup, three superheroes whose purpose is to reduce crime while living a normal childhood.

== Voice cast ==
- Amanda Leighton as Blossom
- Kristen Li as Bubbles
- Natalie Palamides as Buttercup

== Production ==
From top to bottom: Bubbles, Blossom, and Buttercup as they appear in the reboot series

Cartoon Network announced on June 16, 2014, that they had rebooted The Powerpuff Girls in a new series, which was to be produced by Cartoon Network Studios. In their 2015 upfront on February 19, the network announced that Nick Jennings, who was an art director on SpongeBob SquarePants and Adventure Time, would be its executive producer. Bob Boyle, who previously has produced Clarence, has created Jetix's Yin Yang Yo! and Nick Jr.'s Wow! Wow! Wubbzy! and also former producer and art director of Butch Hartman's animated series The Fairly OddParents and Danny Phantom, would also produce. Meanwhile, Craig McCracken, the creator of the original series, would not work on the series. McCracken has stated on Twitter that the executives at Cartoon Network had considered bringing him back to do the reboot, but his contract with Disney Television Animation prevented him from doing so.

Amanda Leighton, Kristen Li, and Natalie Palamides were announced as the new voice actors of the main characters, playing Blossom, Bubbles, and Buttercup, respectively, replacing the original voice actors Cathy Cavadini, Tara Strong, and E. G. Daily. However, Tom Kenny reprises his roles as the Mayor and narrator, while Tom Kane reprises his roles as Professor Utonium and Him. Meanwhile, Roger L. Jackson reprises as Mojo Jojo and Jennifer Hale reprises as Ms. Keane, but not as Princess Morbucks. In April 2016, Jennings revealed that the producers had considered bringing back the original voice actors for the new series, but decided that recasting the roles would infuse new energy.

After the network revealed multiple promotional images from the new series in June 2015, writers from news sites described the visual look as similar to the original series, despite the 15th anniversary special Dance Pantsed, which was broadcast on January 20, 2014, featuring a different art style rendered in 3D. On May 26, 2016, Natalie Palamides confirmed that the series had been renewed for a second season. The reboot had a crossover with Teen Titans Go! that aired on June 30, 2016. On September 17, 2017, a new and fourth Powerpuff Girl named Bliss was added in a 5-part special of the reboot, "The Power of Four". Prior to the announcement, a one-shot footage of Bliss was leaked on Cartoon Network Russia. The show's villainess Sedusa was confirmed to be excluded from the reboot as a new character Bianca Bikini took over her role as the main villainess. Some of the older villains, with the exceptions of Mojo Jojo, Princess Morbucks, and HIM, are given limited appearances for few episodes as new villains are introduced for this reboot.

== Broadcast ==
The series premiered in the United States on Cartoon Network on April 4, 2016. It also premiered in Canada on Cartoon Network on the same day. The series was released across the Asia-Pacific region on April 9, in Italy on April 21, in Germany on April 23, and in Africa on April 30. In the United Kingdom and Ireland, it premiered on Cartoon Network on April 25 and on November 7 on CITV and aired on its sister channel Boomerang on October 17, 2016. In Australia, the series premiered on Cartoon Network on April 9 and additionally airs on 9Go!. In the Philippines, it debuted on Cartoon Network on May 2, 2016, in English. On free TV, after the original TV series of the same name that run from 1998 to 2005, it premiered on October 15, 2016, on 5 (now TV5 since August 15, 2020) as one of the two new Cartoon Network shows on the channel along with We Bare Bears and is dubbed in Filipino/Tagalog. Both shows also premiered on CNN Philippines as part of their morning block starting September 1, 2018, alongside two other shows from Cartoon Network: Ben 10 and Adventure Time. However, they are broadcast in Filipino dub.

The series also premiered in the United States and Latin America on Cartoon Network's sister network, Boomerang on November 1, 2016.

The series also premiered in the Middle East on Cartoon Network Arabic on April 29, 2016. It debuted in India on Cartoon Network in 2016 and 2017 and is broadcast on the country's Cartoon Network HD+.

In mainland China, the series was aired on Haha-Toonmax TV (formerly Haha Children's Channel and Shanghai Toonmax Cartoon TV).

== Reception ==
=== Critical response ===
The series was met with mixed-to-negative reviews from critics and fans. Henry Solotaroff-Webber of The Badger Herald enjoyed the series, saying "Overall, this new rendition of a classic animated program is a triumph in my eyes. It recaptures much of what made the last show so important for kids to see while still thoroughly scratching a nostalgia itch for those looking to go back." IGN gave the premiere episode "Man Up" an 8.0 out of 10, saying "While the new voice cast will take some getting used to, and the absence of Cathy Cavadini, Tara Strong and E.G. Daily is strongly felt, the show still manages to capture the essence of the Powerpuff Girls." The Nerdist gave the first two episodes a 4.5 out of 5, saying "if you loved the original show, chances are you'll love these new episodes." Screen Rant gave it a positive review, saying "Although the revival doesn't quite hit the mark on what made audiences fall in love with McCracken's original series, The Powerpuff Girls is an excellent addition to the franchise." Collider gave it 4 stars, saying "it's worth viewing the new version of The Powerpuff Girls on its own merits because it's a solid cartoon that delivers on its promises."

The Occidental Weekly lamented that the series "lacks the impeccable comedic timing and wit of the original" and called the voice acting "mediocre at best", while also criticizing the writing, which it deemed subpar. Slate was critical of the show's "self-conscious feminist overtones", and compared the show unfavorably to the original, particularly the second-season episode "The Powerpuff Girls' Best Rainy Day Adventure Ever". Polygon criticized that the show lost what they considered made the original so special: "fighting seems like an afterthought, as if Cartoon Network wants to keep the Girls a safe distance from the fray", and that the show was a "step backward, not forward". Jessica Swartz of Inverse said that new viewers might not know who the villains are or what their motivations are, as no introduction was given to the characters. Swartz also went on to say that the show focuses too much on the main characters, and overall called it a "mediocre cartoon". Shelby Watson of The All State praised the show's voice acting, but criticized the increased focus on the girls' domestic lives rather than fighting crime, and was especially critical of the animation, writing: "The animation is beyond lazy... the art direction itself is catastrophic. Animators routinely forget their own rules on how to animate their characters, leading to a disjointed style that just comes across like the animators don't care." Watson also noted other technical issues in the series, such as inconsistencies in character design or misuse of perspective, saying that they "shouldn't happen in a professional studio."

Despite its mixed reception and low ratings in its native United States, the reboot has been received higher viewership in Europe since being broadcast on free-to-air networks in the United Kingdom, France and Poland.

=== Original cast and crew ===
Before the series aired, Cavadini, Daily, and Strong were displeased to learn the main characters had been recast; Strong called it "a stab in the heart" on Twitter. Strong had announced after the upfront in February that this was a "strictly creative" decision by the network, though in June of the same year said that the network had never contacted any of the three actresses prior to the decision to recast. In an interview with The Comic Book Cast in May 2015, Kenny claimed that McCracken "does give it his blessing", but in May 2016 McCracken denied doing so on his Twitter posts, commenting that he had never given the new reboot his official blessing. McCracken said that he wished that Cartoon Network had stopped their plans for a reboot of the original Powerpuff Girls property but also acknowledged from a financial view why the new series was commissioned. However, at the 2017 New York Comic Con, Strong stated that she had no ill will towards the new cast and had given the show her blessing.

=== Controversies ===
The season one episode "Horn, Sweet Horn" received scrutiny from the media after the episode's handling of transgender themes prompted criticism from LGBT viewers. Sulagna Misra, writing for Fusion's official website, described the character Donny as an "interesting metaphor for transgender identity" but saw poor judgment in the choice to present the transformed character as a monster. She found the larger topic of identity reversed by making the plot so "convoluted" and preferred if the character's monstrous transformation had been a temporary gag instead. Marie Solis of Mic also viewed the episode as a failed attempt to convey social issues, on par with the "Twisted Sister" episode from the 1998 Powerpuff Girls series, in which the main characters conjure up a mentally challenged and physically deformed sister. Dorian Dawes of the magazine Bitch was extremely critical of the episode, calling its message questionable and dangerous in the wake of the House Bill 2 controversy. Dawes denounced the episode as irresponsible to the series' primary demographic and felt it was written solely to make the producers feel righteous about their inclusion of transgender themes. One of the writers has claimed to have not intended to imply any subtext and blamed the advertising surrounding the episode.

One of the female characters, Ms. Bellum, was written off the show. In an interview with the Los Angeles Times, Nick Jennings explained "We felt like Ms. Bellum wasn't quite indicative of the kind of messaging we wanted to be giving out at this time, so we sort of had her move on... And that was a good choice I think on our part". This change caused a negative response from critics and fans of the original show, who complained that the removal of Ms. Bellum's character (as well as villainess Sedusa being completely dropped from the show) negated the feminist message of the reboot.

=== Awards and nominations ===
Year	Award	Category	Nominee	Result
2016	Primetime Emmy Awards	Outstanding Short Form Animated Program	Nick Jennings, Rob Sorcher, Brian A. Miller, Jennifer Pelphrey, Curtis Lelash, Bob Boyle, Pernelle A. Hayes, Haley Mancini, Kyle Neswald, Benjamin P. Carow, Jake Goldman, Julia 'Fitzy' Fitzmaurice, Robert Alvarez & Richard Collado (for "Once Upon a Townsville")	Nominated
2017	Gracie Awards	National Family Series	The Powerpuff Girls	Won
2018	Annie Awards	Outstanding Achievement for Music in an Animated Television/Broadcast Production	Mike Reagan & Bob Boyle (for "Home, Sweet Homesick")	Nominated

== Merchandise and media ==
=== Home media ===
The Powerpuff Girls reboot has seen two Region 1 DVD releases, six Region 2 DVD releases, and two Region 4 DVD releases. All of these have been presented in 16:9 aspect ratio formats.

Region 1
DVD title	Season(s)	Episode count	Total running time	Release dates
Tiara Trouble	1	12	132 minutes	February 14, 2017
The Last Donnycorn	1, 2	12	143 minutes	August 15, 2017

Region 2
DVD title	Season(s)	Episode count	Total running time	Release dates
Important Friends	1	4	44 minutes	July 4, 2018
Battle!	1	4	44 minutes	July 4, 2018
Cute Trouble Edition	1	4	44 minutes	July 4, 2018
Hidden Secret Hen	1	4	44 minutes	July 4, 2018
Always Gently Knows	1	4	44 minutes	July 4, 2018
DVD Box	1	20	220 minutes	July 4, 2018

Region 4
DVD title	Season(s)	Episode count	Total running time	Release dates
Tiara Trouble	1	12	132 minutes	December 1, 2016
Season 1	1	39	470 minutes	October 25, 2017

=== Toys ===
Before the series premiered, a toy line for the series was announced to be released in 2016 by Spin Master, with more toys released in 2017. The toys include the new 2-in-1 playsets and more. A McDonald's Happy Meal promotion for the series ran from June 14 to July 5, 2016, in the United States, including mini action figures, rings, and collectibles. On August 24, 2018, two Lego sets were released in the United States and United Kingdom.

=== Comic books ===
In April 2016, it was announced that a line of Powerpuff Girls reboot comic books would be released in July of that year, being published by IDW Publishing (who also published comic books for the original series).

=== Video games ===
Cartoon Network released five mobile games based on the series, titled "Flipped Out", "Glitch Fixers", "Mojo Madness", "Ready, Set, Monsters", and "Monkey Mania". The latter two are free, but the former is $2.99. All games are available on both the Apple App Store and Google Play.

A pair of Powerpuff Girls-themed packs for the toys-to-life video game Lego Dimensions were released on September 12, 2017. These include a Team Pack, containing playable Blossom and Bubbles figures and constructable Octi and PPG Smartphone items; and a Fun Pack, containing a playable Buttercup figure and a constructable Mega Blast Bot. The packs add a new Powerpuff Girls-themed open-world area and battle arenas to the game.
