= Japanese accent =

Japanese accent may refer to:

- Japanese-accented English
- Japanese dialects, regional variants of Japanese pronunciation
- Japanese pitch accent, or high and low pronunciations to distinguish moras
