= What Are Little Boys Made Of? =

Nursery rhyme and traditional song

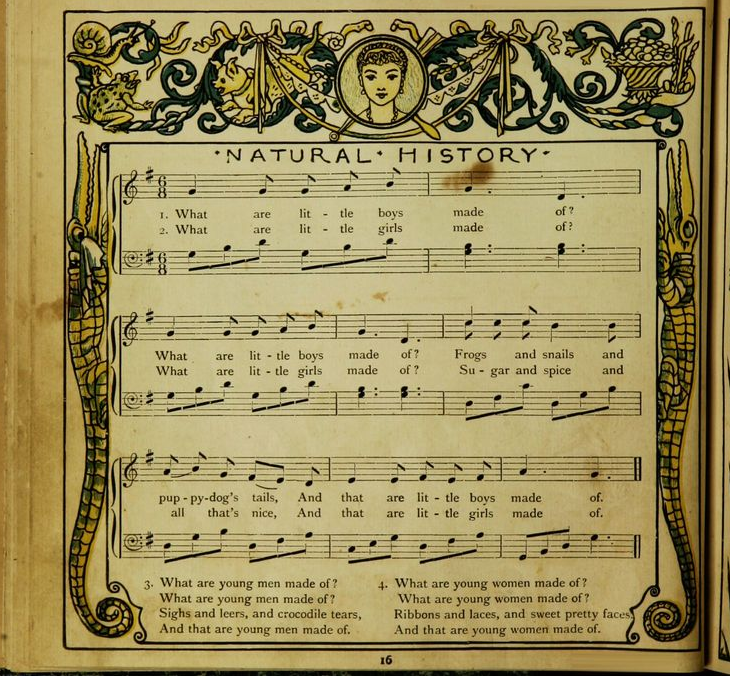
- Natural History

Nursery rhyme
- Published: c. 1820
- Songwriters: Robert Southey (suggested)

Tune on piano
- file; help

"What Are Little Boys Made Of?" is a nursery rhyme dating from the early 19th century. It has a Roud Folk Song Index number of 821.

The author of the rhyme is uncertain, but may be English poet Robert Southey (1774–1843).

== Lyrics ==
Here is a representative modern version of the lyrics:

What are little boys made of?
What are little boys made of?
Snips, snails
And puppy-dogs' tails
That's what little boys are made of.

What are little girls made of?
What are little girls made of?
Sugar and spice
And everything nice [or "all things nice"]
That's what little girls are made of.

The rhyme appears in many variant forms. For example, other versions may describe boys as being made of "snaps", "frogs", "snakes", or "slugs", rather than "snips" as above.

== Origins ==
In the earliest known versions, the first ingredient for boys is either "snips" or "snigs", the latter being a Cumbrian dialect word for a small eel.

The rhyme sometimes appears as part of a larger work called What Folks Are Made Of or What All the World Is Made Of. Other stanzas describe what babies, young men, young women, sailors, soldiers, nurses, fathers, mothers, old men, old women, and all folks are made of. According to Iona and Peter Opie, this first appears in a manuscript by the English poet Robert Southey (1774–1843), who added the stanzas other than the two below. Though it is not mentioned elsewhere in his works or papers, it is generally agreed to be by him.

The relevant section in the version attributed to Southey was:

What are little boys made of
What are little boys made of
Snips & snails & puppy dogs tails
And such are little boys made of.

What are little girls made of
What are little girls made of
Sugar & spice & all things nice
And such are little girls made of.

== See also ==
- List of folk songs by Roud number
- The Powerpuff Girls
- Peanuts
