= Ms J Contemplates Her Choice =

- Directed by: Jason Lai
- Written by: Jason Lai; Yvonne Loh
- Produced by: Lim Suat Yen; Ng Say Yong; Dennis Pok
- Starring: Kit Chan; Xiang Yun; Bobby Tonelli; Shane Pow; Seraph Sun
- Cinematography: Brian McDairmant
- Edited by: Priscilla Goh
- Music by: Ruth Ling
- Production company: Oak3 Films
- Release dates: 6 December 2014 (Singapore International Film Festival); 2 July 2015 (Singapore)
- Running time: 88 minutes
- Country: Singapore
- Languages: Mandarin; English; Teochew; Sinhala; Filipino

Ms J Contemplates Her Choice (Chinese: 石头剪刀布) is a 2014 Singaporean psychological thriller film directed by Jason Lai, starring Kit Chan, Xiang Yun, Bobby Tonelli, Shane Pow and Seraph Sun

== Cast ==
- Kit Chan as Jo Yang
- Xiang Yun as Stacey Yang
- Bobby Tonelli as Ken Casey
- Shane Pow
- Seraph Sun as young Jo
- Marcus Chiau as Nick Yang
- Sierra Bustos as Sarah Yang
- Amy Cheng as Liz Pang
- Wiggie Lim
- Angeline Yap as Prostitute

== Release ==
The film premiered at the Singapore International Film Festival on 6 December 2014.

== Reception ==
Clarence Tsui of The Hollywood Reporter called the film an "enigmatic socially conscious thriller delivered with visual flair." May Seah of Today wrote that while the film "does have glaring faults", the "way in which it presents its ideas is thought provoking enough to make this a film worth watching."

Jocelyn Lee of The New Paper rated the film 3 stars out of 5 and wrote that Chan is "natural and convincing". Lin Mingwen of the My Paper rated the film 3 stars out of 5. John Lui of The Straits Times rated the film 2.5 stars out of 5 and wrote: "There is nothing wrong in challenging an audience with ambiguity or a discursive story – the art lies in making it all feel of one piece."
