= True Crime: New York City =

2005 video game

- Developer: Luxoflux (Note: Ported to GameCube and Xbox by Exakt Entertainment)
- Publisher: Activision (Note: Windows version published by Aspyr. Mobile version developed and published by Hands-On Mobile.)
- Producer: Brian Clarke
- Designer: Peter Morawiec
- Programmers: Cary Hara; Matthew Whiting
- Artists: Kenton Draeger; Jim Sedota; Joby Otero
- Writers: Peter Morawiec; Duane Stinnett; Arthur Usher
- Composer: Sean Murray
- Platforms: PlayStation 2, Xbox, GameCube, Windows, Mobile
- Release: November 16, 2005: PlayStation 2, Xbox & GameCube; NA: November 16, 2005; EU: November 25, 2005 Windows; NA: March 28, 2006; EU: March 30, 2006 Mobile; NA: March 27, 2007; EU: 2007
- Genre: Action-adventure
- Mode: Single-player

True Crime: New York City is a 2005 action-adventure video game developed by Luxoflux for PlayStation 2. It was ported to GameCube and Xbox by Exakt Entertainment, to Microsoft Windows by Aspyr, and to mobile by Hands-On Mobile. It was published on all systems by Activision. The PlayStation 2, Xbox and GameCube versions were released in November 2005, the PC version in March 2006, and the mobile version in March 2007. It is the second and final entry in the True Crime franchise, after the 2003 game, True Crime: Streets of LA.

The game tells the story of Marcus Reed, a former New York City gang member turned police officer. During his first night on the job after receiving a promotion to detective in the Organized Crime Unit, Reed witnesses the death of his mentor. Helped by an FBI agent who is investigating a mole in the OCU, Reed embarks to find out who killed his friend and bring down the mole. The game features a 25-square-mile (65 km^{2}) recreation of the borough of Manhattan, with most street names, major landmarks and highways reproduced with GPS accuracy.

New York City received mixed reviews from critics. Originally intended as the first of a two-part series set in New York and featuring Marcus Reed, Activision scrapped the direct sequel and put plans for future True Crime games on hold. In 2007, they hired United Front Games to develop an open world game set in Hong Kong. By 2009, this game had become True Crime: Hong Kong. However, in 2011, the game was canceled. The publishing rights were picked up by Square Enix several months later, and True Crime: Hong Kong was ultimately released as Sleeping Dogs, which has no connection to the True Crime series. In 2014, Activision dropped the True Crime trademark completely.

== Gameplay ==
Basic gameplay in the PlayStation 2 version of the game. The HUD shows the mini-map on the bottom left, Marcus' funds, rank and health on the bottom right, and his current fighting style on the top right.

True Crime is an open world action-adventure game played from a third-person perspective, in which the player controls Detective Marcus Reed of the PDNY. There are four "major cases" in the game: the Magdalena Cartel, the Palermo Mob, the Presidents Club, and the Shadow Tong. When the game begins, only the Magdalena Cartel case is available, but once that case has been closed, the player is free to take on the remaining three cases in any order they wish.

The game falls into the subgenre of Grand Theft Auto clones as the core gameplay and game mechanics are very similar to 2001's Grand Theft Auto III, 2002's Grand Theft Auto: Vice City, and 2004's Grand Theft Auto: San Andreas. The player can travel across the city freely, commandeer vehicles, do whatever they want in terms of attacking and/or killing civilians, progress through the storyline at their own leisure, and engage in minigames and sidequests. The three sidequests are a street racing circuit, an underground fight club tournament, and securing confidential informants.

A major difference from previous open world action-adventure video games, including the game's predecessor, True Crime: Streets of LA, is that many buildings throughout the city, beyond those related to the story, are accessible to the player. These include pharmacies where the player can purchase medicine, delis and hot dog stands where they can purchase food, clothing stores where they can purchase new outfits, car dealers where they can purchase new cars, dojos where they can purchase new fighting techniques, record stores where they can purchase new songs for the soundtrack, gun stores where they can purchase new weaponry and ammunition, and other random buildings like hotels, nightclubs, restaurants, and apartments. In most business interiors, the player can extort the owner for extra cash or plant evidence to make a false arrest.

Another new addition to the True Crime franchise is the ability for the player to traverse the city not just on foot or by car, but by using public transport. The New York City Subway is available for use, and the player can also hail yellow taxis at any time, requesting transport to anywhere on the map. Both modes of transportation require a minimal fee.

The game involves three main types of missions, each with their own unique gameplay: shooting, fighting and driving.

In shooting missions, the game auto-targets the closest opponent. If the player wishes to switch target to another opponent, they must do so manually. When the player is in shooting mode, they can enter "Precision Targeting" at any time. At this point, the game switches to first-person, zooms in on the target, and goes into slow motion momentarily. While in Precision Targeting, if the reticle turns blue, the player can hit the enemy with a neutralizing, non-lethal shot. If the player fires when the reticle is red, the enemy will be killed instantly. Players can also take cover during shootouts, firing from behind cover when the opportunity presents itself. Players are also free to pick up any weapons dropped by enemies. Once the ammo of these weapons is depleted, however, Reed will drop the weapon and revert to his standard issue .38 ACP handgun, which, although it needs to be reloaded, never runs out of ammo.

In hand-to-hand combat, the player has three main attacks: light attack, heavy attack, and grapple. When the player grapples an opponent, they are free to throw them, or hit them with a number of light and/or heavy attacks. At certain points during combat, the enemy will be stunned, and a meter will appear on-screen prompting the player to press either the heavy attack or light attack button as much as possible within a set time. The more times the player presses the button, the more devastating the resulting special attack. The player can also toggle between different fighting styles, and switch to using a melee weapon at any time.

The map of Manhattan in the PC version of the game. Note the various different precincts (the larger map on the right shows that every precinct is clean, indicated by its green color). Symbols on the map include a red square for a random crime, an orange square for a side-mission, yellow circles for police depos and white circles for shops.

Driving missions can involve either trying to catch another car, or escape from another car. At all times, when the player is in a car, their car's condition is shown on-screen. If the car's health meter empties, the car is close to destruction. As with Streets of LA, during normal driving missions, the player can solve random crimes given by the radio dispatcher, although, unlike in the first game, these crimes can now take place inside buildings as well as on the streets. Additionally, the map is divided up into twenty different neighborhoods. When Reed solves a random crime in a particular area, the crime rate in that area drops. After he has solved a set number of crimes in one area, that area is considered "clean," and crime rates will not increase (although random crimes will still occur within the area). If Reed continues to ignore random crimes in a given area before it is clean, the crime rate in that area will increase, leading to stores closing, dirtier streets, boarded up buildings, and more aggressive civilians. As a result, more random crimes will need to be resolved to clean the area up.

Unlike Streets of LA, where the player could purchase upgrades at the cost of reward points and upon completion of a challenge, upgrades in New York City simply cost money, with no points system and no challenge in place. Upgrades become available for purchase as the player moves up through five grades of promotion. Money in the game can be earned legitimately by collecting wages, or illegitimately by selling evidence at pawn shops and/or extorting business owners.

The player also has a "Good Cop/Bad Cop" meter. If the player arrests criminals, solves crimes, shoots enemies with neutralizing shots, and knocks out opponents instead of killing them, they will get Good Cop points. If, however, they kill civilians and unarmed criminals, shoot armed criminals in the head, fail to identify themselves as a police officer before opening fire, extort businesses, or sell evidence to pawn stores, they will get Bad Cop points. The player's status as a Good Cop or a Bad Cop will affect the game's ending. If the player performs actions that lead to Bad Cop points, it will also fill a rogue meter and when it gets too high, the player is considered to have "gone rogue," and other police officers will begin to attack Reed.

== Plot ==
On Christmas 2000, gangster Marcus Reed (Avery Waddell), heir to an empire run by his imprisoned father Isaiah "The King" Reed (Laurence Fishburne), avenges a betrayal by wiping out traitors at a safehouse. His godfather, PDNY detective Terry Higgins (Mickey Rourke), covers for him on the condition that Marcus turn his life around.

By 2005, Marcus is a PDNY beat cop under Lt. Deena Dixon (Mariska Hargitay) and is promoted to the Organized Crime Unit (OCU), led by Chief Victor Navarro (Esai Morales). On Marcus’ first day as an OCU detective, Higgins is killed in a warehouse explosion. Suspended back to Dixon’s Street Crimes Unit, Marcus is secretly recruited by FBI Agent Gabriel Whitting (Christopher Walken), who suspects there is a mole in OCU. Higgins’ death, Whitting claims, was linked to this mole, who is in contact with four major Manhattan crime syndicates.

Marcus first infiltrates the Magdalena Cartel, responsible for much of the city’s cocaine trade. Socialite Teresa Castillo (Socorro Santiago), whom Higgins had cultivated as an informant, turns out to be Magdalena Rojas, the true cartel boss. Marcus arrests her, learning only that the mole is a high-ranking OCU officer.

Next, Marcus investigates the Palermo Mob. After dismantling their organ trafficking operation, he confronts Don Vincent Tuzzi (Fred Berman), who reveals he only spoke to the mole—whom he calls “El Jefe”—over the phone and notes a Spanish accent.

Marcus’ third target is the Presidents Club, an African-American gang controlling the drug “Pop.” Led by Lionel “Benjamin” Jones (Cornell Womack), the gang’s hierarchy includes Lincoln (Phil Morris), Hamilton (Richard Yearwood), Jackson, and Grant (Greg Eagles). Marcus saves Kobi (Jeanne Mori), a local Yakuza leader, from an attack ordered by Jackson, and ultimately kills Jackson. Jones later murders Kobi before Marcus apprehends him, revealing only that “El Jefe” is the OCU contact.

The final gang is the Shadow Tong, a Triad faction led by Leeland Shen (Jerry Ying). Marcus returns Shen’s runaway step-sister Vivian (Jennifer Chu) to gain his trust, but Shen uncovers Marcus’ cover and orders his execution. Marcus survives, dismantles their human trafficking operation, and learns of a bribe pickup arranged by the mole.

With evidence pointing to Navarro, Marcus and Whitting intercept the bribe at Grand Central Station. Navarro claims he is being framed, and the game’s ending diverges based on Marcus’ morality rating:

- In the good ending*, Whitting arrests Navarro. On his way home, Marcus is confronted by a very-much-alive Higgins, who faked his death to frame Navarro. Higgins tries to bribe Marcus, but Marcus refuses, chasing Higgins through the subway and killing him in a train crash. Marcus later meets Dixon and Whitting, who vows to help Isaiah get a hearing with the DA.
- In the bad ending*, Navarro kills Whitting and flees. Marcus kills Navarro in a subway brawl, only to find Higgins waiting for him. Realizing Higgins’ deception, Marcus executes him, then sits alone in the subway station, unsure what to do with Higgins’ bribe money.

== Development ==
The game was first announced on July 21, 2004, when Activision CEO Ron Doornink announced plans for "sequels to True Crime, Call of Duty, Spider-Man, Tony Hawk, Shrek, and Quake." However, nothing more was heard about the game for almost a year, until May 2005, when Activision revealed that the game was so big, developers Luxoflux had drafted in staff from another Activision owned developer, Z-Axis. The game, under the provisional title True Crime 2, was unofficially scheduled for a third quarter release, and was expected to be unveiled at the upcoming E3 event. Doornink stated "In the third quarter, we plan to release our strongest and most diverse lineup ever—specifically, brand-new games for Tony Hawk, Call of Duty, X-Men, True Crime, Quake, and Shrek. Each of these franchises is targeted at a different consumer."

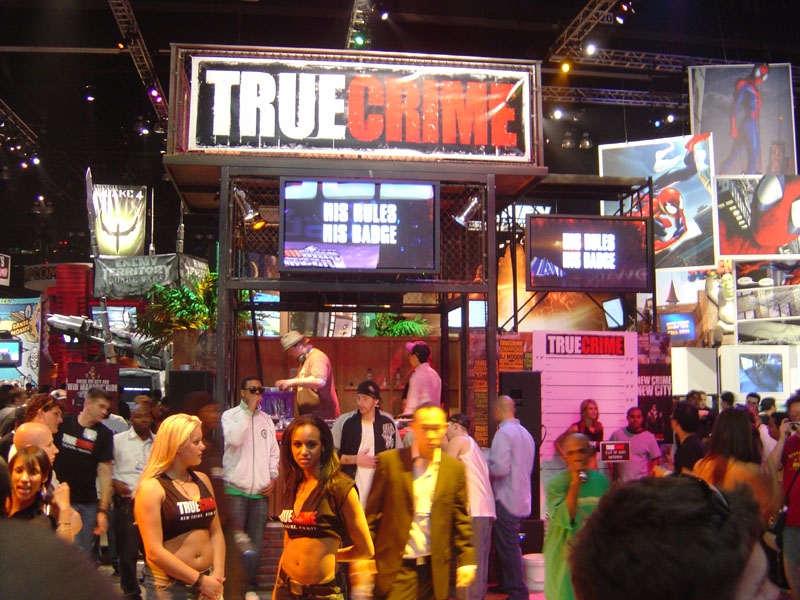
Promotion at E3 in May 2005

On May 18, Activision debuted a trailer for the game. The trailer revealed nothing about the plot or the location, but simply featured Marcus Reed arresting some criminals. Attached to the trailer was a competition called "True Crime: Guess the City and Win Marcus' Ride." Players were encouraged to go to the game's official website and guess in which city they think the game is set. The competition's winner would win a Chrysler 300, Reed's car when the game begins. At the E3 event, Activision dedicated a large part of their booth to the upcoming game, but no footage was made available, nor was any plot information, or even a title, with the game now going by True Crime 2005. The Chrysler available in the competition was present, as were DJs playing songs which would be featured in the game. All that was confirmed at E3 was the game would definitely be released on current generation systems.

On June 22, 2005, True Crime's official website revealed the game would take place in New York City, with an image of the Manhattan skyline appearing as the site's wallpaper. In August, IGN published an interview with former NYPD detective Bill Clark, who had previously served as executive producer and technical advisor of NYPD Blue, and was now working as head technical advisor for True Crime: New York City. Clark had been with the NYPD for twenty-five years, seventeen in homicide. During his time on the force, he was involved in such major cases as the Son of Sam investigation, and the collapse of several of the "Five Families". Of his involvement with the game, Clark stated:

Activision approached me because it set out to create a really deep cop game in New York City and felt I could provide insight into what it is really like to be on the front lines and do police work in the city. They felt the more they knew about the realities and details of the job, the better game experience they could make. Specifically, they wanted to know everything — how interrogations work, how we use informants, what type of weaponry is available to officers, how we train, the ranking system, how you become a detective, how precincts work, what members of the Street Crimes Unit do, how murder investigations work, what the badge looks like, how crime tracking stats work, how officers talk, the most dangerous parts of New York, the types of crimes I encountered, some of the stranger situations I've encountered, the humorous stuff that happens on the job, what undercover cops wear, the dangers of undercover and more. I also looked at the game itself for authenticity — to give them advice on how to make NYC look and feel real. I also reviewed the script to give them tips — having helped create an authentic cop drama, I was able to help them translate the realities into an entertaining game experience.

In his efforts to help Activision make the best game they could, Clark found a compromise had to be reached between reality and the nature of video gaming:

Working on an entertainment vehicle, and specifically working on a videogame where it is all action all the time, you have to find a way to make the reality of police work fun within the context of the game. For instance, in real life, an interrogation may take five to ten hours to get a tough perp to "flip" and tell you what really happened. Obviously, that doesn't always make a good gaming experience. I tried to lend my expertise to describe all the major events and key interactions that take place in "real life" police work and then Activision finds a fun way to integrate this police work into the game. You'll find interrogations, citations, arrests, use of informants, undercover work, pursuits, and more in the game. We also talked about some of the more dubious behaviors that have taken place in police work — cops going bad and taking bribes, extorting, going rotten — these types of events are also in the game.

"With True Crime: New York City, we wanted to remove it from the more juvenile humor that we had in True Crime: Streets of LA. We don't have dragons anymore. We wanted to give the audience more of a mature flavored game. We really wanted it to be like watching a crime drama on TV; The Shield, CSI, The Wire, good story, good feel, more serious tone."

— Jim Hess; Producer, Activision

A work-in-progress build of the game was first shown on September 7. Activision revealed the basic plot and announced the branching storyline system from Streets of LA was not being used. Instead, when the player fails a mission, they would simply be given the option to replay it, meaning story content would not be missed. They also announced several features new to the game, including a continuous day/night cycle, a more populated city than Los Angeles in Streets of LA, a much darker palette than the first game, more cars and vehicles, the ability to travel by taxi or subway, and the freedom to enter buildings beyond those related to plot. They also explained the precinct component of the game; if the player ignores random crimes in particular areas, shops will begin to close down, the city streets will become dirtier and buildings will be boarded up. It was also revealed the playing area would be 25 square miles (65 km^{2}).

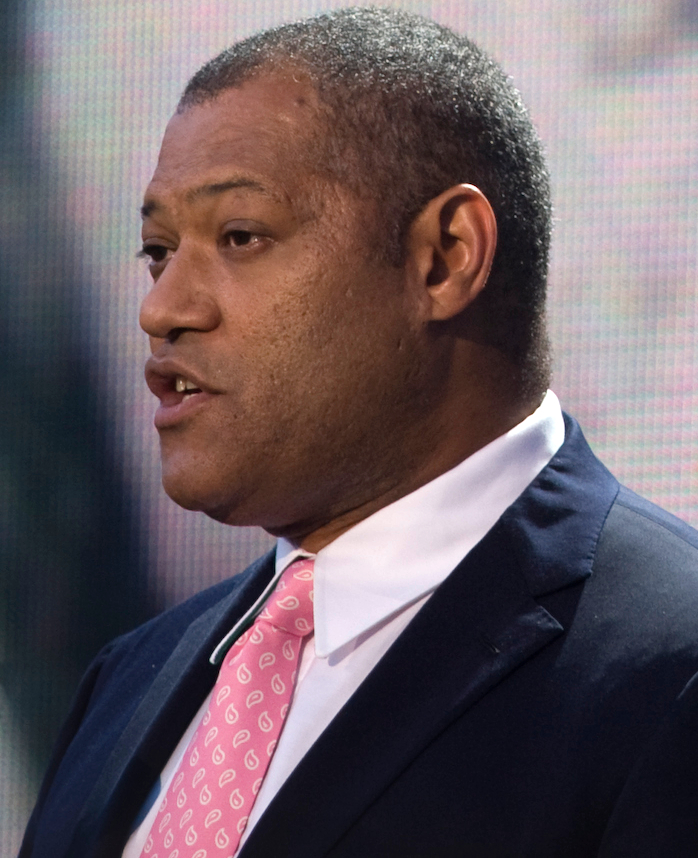
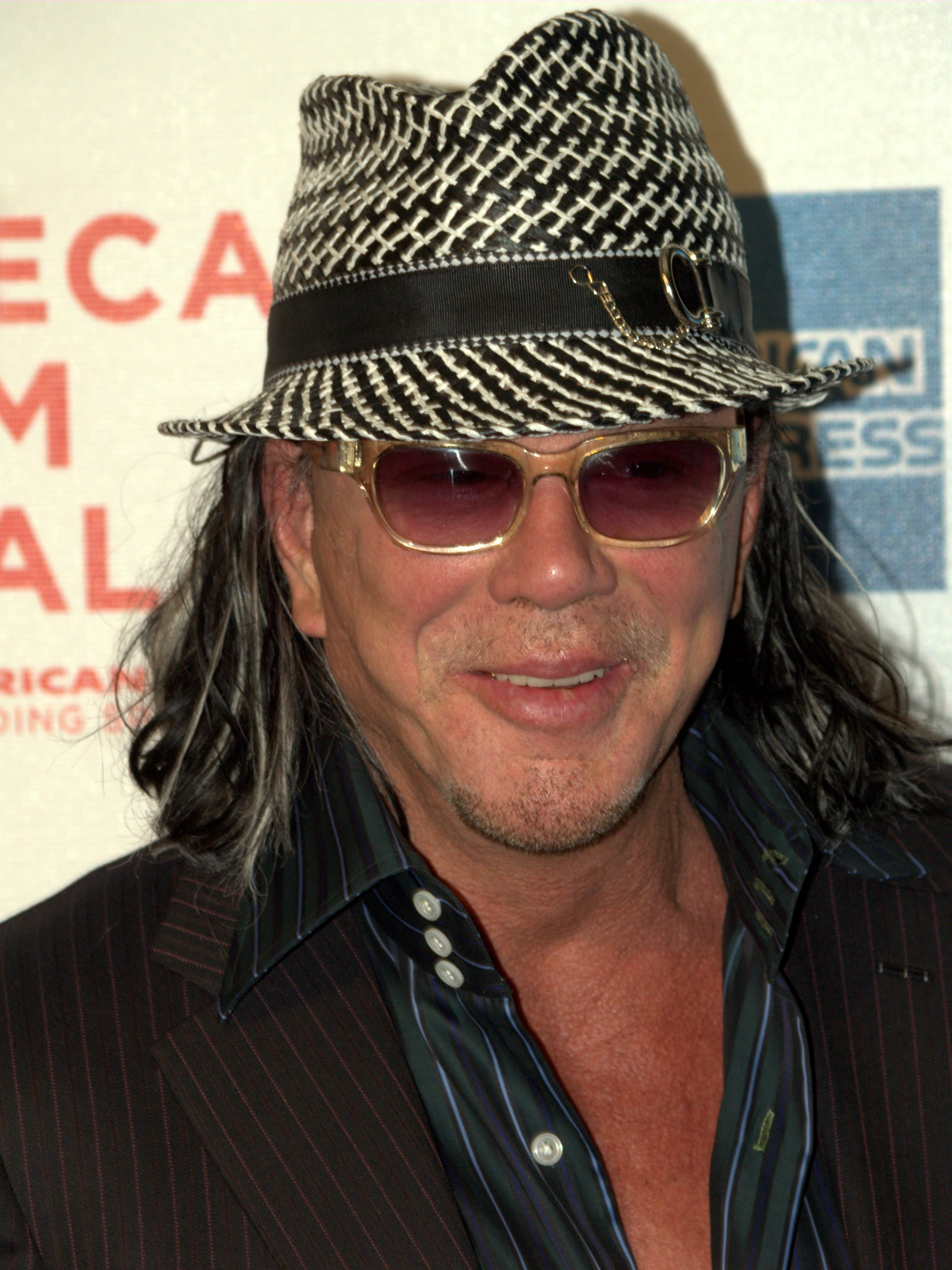
Laurence Fishburne (left) and Mickey Rourke (right) play Marcus Reed's father and godfather, respectively.

The following week, the main voice cast was announced, including Laurence Fishburne, Mickey Rourke, Christopher Walken, Mariska Hargitay, Esai Morales, and Traci Lords. Marcus Reed would be voiced by Avery Waddell. Details of the soundtrack were released a week later. The soundtrack's headliner was Redman, who was recording an original song for the game, and would also be an unlocakble character with his own minigame, similar to the involvement Snoop Dogg had in Streets of LA. Tim Riley, worldwide executive of music at Activision, stated "As an East Coast artist who paid his dues performing in the clubs of New York City, Redman's inspired rhymes bring the gritty realism of the city to life in our game. His bold lyrics and hard-edged funk beats capture the vibes of the city, from Washington Heights to Harlem and all the way down to Battery Park." Activision also announced that although the game had only one original song, it would feature over eighty licensed tracks from artists such as Jay Z, Fat Joe, A Tribe Called Quest, The Ramones, The Velvet Underground, My Chemical Romance, The Bravery, and Bob Dylan.

As part of the video game's launch, PUMA announced a unique sneaker mission within the game, and the production of a special edition sneaker. In the game, if players find all of the True Crime RS-100 sneakers throughout the city and return them to real New York City retailers featured in the game, an exclusive PUMA outfit for Reed will be unlocked. In addition, players could purchase the limited-edition True Crime RS-100 sneakers within the same New York City stores in the real world.

=== NYPD controversy ===
On September 26, 2005, NYPD Commissioner Raymond Kelly and Patrolmen's Benevolent Association President Patrick Lynch called for a boycott of the game, citing its depiction of law-breaking police officers as damaging and offensive. In an interview with the New York Daily News, Kelly stated "It's an outrage. I think it disrespects all police officers." Although the game was made in conjunction with two former NYPD detectives, Bill Clark and Tom Walker (author of Fort Apache: The Bronx), and the police force in the game is called the PDNY (as opposed to the real life NYPD), Kelly stated "It's totally inappropriate. It's a tough job, a dangerous job, and this undermines what police officers try to do. I'm saddened that some former members of the department are linked to that video game." Lynch said of Clark, "The cop who worked on this video should look in the mirror. He makes it harder for everyone working the job." Clark responded by commenting that police unions "should stop worrying about video games and spend more time getting cops more than a $25,000 starting salary."

== Reception ==
Reception

Aggregate score
Aggregator	Score			
Aggregator	GameCube	PC	PS2	Xbox
Metacritic	59/100	54/100	60/100	60/100

Review scores
Publication	Score			
Publication	GameCube	PC	PS2	Xbox
Eurogamer			6/10	
GameSpot	4.6/10	5.2/10	4.6/10	4.3/10
GameSpy			2.5/5	
IGN	7.8/10	6.5/10	7.8/10	7.8/10
Nintendo Power	4/5			
Official U.S. PlayStation Magazine			3.5/5	
Official Xbox Magazine (US)				6.5/10
PC Gamer (US)		62%		

True Crime: New York City received "mixed or average reviews" across all systems; the PlayStation 2 version holds an aggregate score of 60 out of 100 on Metacritic, based on forty-seven reviews; the Xbox version 60 out of 100, based on forty-three reviews, the GameCube version 59 out of 100, based on twenty-five reviews; and the PC version 54 out of 100, based on twelve reviews.

IGN's Chris Roper scored the console versions 7.8 out of 10, praising "how well your general duties as a cop are tied into the game, working very well alongside your own personal investigations," and finding the gameplay and game mechanics superior to Streets of LA. His main criticism was "it doesn't really take any risks [...] it doesn't feel like it's an altogether new gaming experience." However, he wrote "True Crime's strengths lie in the solid ways that everything is put together." He concluded "it's a solid title through and through, but you won't find a whole lot of water cooler moments in there [...] If you're tired of the whole GTA thing and want more substance, this may not be the game for you. For everyone else though, TC: NYC is definitely worth checking out." He scored the PC version 6.5 out of 10, and was critical of Aspyr's work on the port; "it seems the company did little more than get the game up and running on the PC and didn't bother to fine-tune a few of the controls for the system." He was highly critical of the graphics; "Pop-up is a major problem [...] LOD on characters is also pretty screwy, with entirely mis-matched low-res models filling in for some characters [...] shadows and such pop in and out of view, camera movement during cutscenes would cut at odd times or display the wrong angle for a split second, etc. etc. It simply feels unpolished."

Eurogamer's Jim Rossignol scored the PlayStation 2 version 6 out of 10, writing "True Crime trips over its own inflated Nikes with just a few too many moments of lamentable emptiness." He was critical of the AI; "The perps you take down never suggest that they are anything other than mindless automata ready to be slain, and exhibit an artificiality that could never be described as 'intelligence'." He also compared the game unfavorably to Grand Theft Auto: San Andreas; "while artistically more accomplished, New York City lacks the personality of the big daddy. And there is little in the way of humour."

GameSpy's Sterling McGarvey scored the PlayStation 2 version 2.5 out of 5, writing Luxoflux have "turned a slightly above-par GTA clone into a sub-par franchise." He was critical of the recreation of New York; "textures look rather drab and plain, and the draw distance looks blurry and uninteresting [...] it really feels as though the development team failed to capture one of New York's most distinctive traits: the raw humanity of it all." Of the graphics, he wrote, "the frame rate has a knack for chugging. Considering it's a console and not a five year-old PC running this game, it's unacceptable. Out of nowhere, the frame rate will completely bottom out while Marcus patrols the streets." He concluded by criticizing the game for being unfinished, arguing anyone who buys it will "have dropped their hard-earned money to beta test a truly unfinished game."

GameSpot's Greg Mueller was extremely unimpressed, scoring the GameCube and PlayStation 2 versions 4.6 out of 10, and the Xbox version 4.3 out of 10. He accused the game of being "so riddled with problems that it feels like it was rushed to make it to store shelves in time for the holidays." He cited "bugs that will make you randomly fall through the ground into a bunch of nothingness, bugs that make textures change when you get in and out of a car, bugs that cause you to inadvertently break a scripted sequence, thus making it impossible to complete a mission. There are also collision detection issues and edge detection problems that cause you to get stuck on the edge of a platform. That's not all--the game will actually freeze up entirely from time to time [...] There are also some pretty ugly clipping issues here too." He concluded "True Crime: New York City should be avoided regardless of whether or not you enjoyed the first True Crime. The gameplay has a few almost-decent spots, but the technical problems far outweigh any faint hope this game ever had of being enjoyable. If you're curious about what a video game looks like before it goes through adequate testing and quality assurance, then by all means give this one a try." He scored the PC version 5.2 out of 10, writing, "while it manages to address some of the more egregious glitches that appeared in the console versions of the game, it still doesn't feel like a finished product."

=== Sales and awards ===
True Crime: New York City did not sell well, falling considerably short of Activision's expectations. In North America, True Crime: Streets of LA sold over 300,000 units across all platforms in its first week. By the end of its first month, it had sold over 600,000 units. Ultimately, it went on to sell over 3 million units worldwide across all platforms. By contrast, New York City sold only 72,000 units in its first two weeks, earning only $3.6 million.

At the 2005 Spike Video Game Awards, True Crime was nominated for four awards; "Cyber Vixen of the Year" (Traci Lords as Cassandra Hartz), "Best Supporting Male Performance" (Christopher Walken as Gabrial Whitting), and two "Best Supporting Female" nominations (Traci Lords as Cassandra Hartz and Mariska Hargitay as Deena Dixon). It won "Best Supporting Male Performance" and Lords won "Best Supporting Female Performance." Cyber Vixen of the Year was won by Maria Menounos as Eva in James Bond 007: From Russia with Love.

== Cancelled sequels ==
True Crime: New York City was originally intended to have been the first part of a two-part series set in New York and featuring Marcus Reed, but the second part was never made.

Due to the game's commercial failure, Activision dropped plans for any future True Crime games. However, towards the end of 2007, they approached United Front Games to develop an open world game for next generation consoles set in Hong Kong, and unrelated to the True Crime series. Originally called Black Lotus, the game went into production in early 2008. A year into development, Activision proposed that Black Lotus be incorporated into the True Crime franchise, due to the similarities in their designs and plots; all three games were set in open worlds with narratives centered on an undercover cop in a criminal organization. Activision hoped the new ideas brought to the table by United Front could help revitalize the True Crime franchise. At the 2009 Spike Video Game Awards, Activision debuted the game as True Crime: Hong Kong. Although originally slated for a Fall 2010 release, in May 2010, Activision announced the game had been pushed back to early 2011 "in order to give the development team more time to deliver the high-quality entertainment experience they envision for the game."

In February 2011, however, Activision cancelled True Crime: Hong Kong, claiming that due to "quality issues," further investment would not make the game competitive in the open world genre. United Front executive producer Stephen Van Der Mescht expressed disappointment with Activision's decision, stating the game was "playable from start to finish and virtually complete in terms of content." In June, Activision CEO Eric Hirshberg explained that an escalating budget and development delays were the main contributing factors in the game's cancellation. Hirshberg said the increase in budget and subsequent delays meant the game would have to be "a pretty incredible success in order to be worth the investment that it was taking to get it done." Due to competition posed by other titles, particularly Grand Theft Auto and Red Dead Redemption, and the fact that the previous game in the True Crime series had been a critical and commercial failure, Activision's view was the game would not be able to compete.

However, in August, Square Enix acquired the publishing rights to the game, although they did not buy the rights to the True Crime franchise, which were retained by Activision. Ultimately, the game was renamed Sleeping Dogs and released in August 2012. In December 2014, Activision abandoned the True Crime trademark completely.
