= Wayang Boy =

- Directed by: Raymond Tan
- Written by: Raymond Tan
- Produced by: Louis Chew
- Starring: Denzyl Dharma; Law Kar-ying; Michelle Yim; Chantel Liu; Chen Tianwen; Kym Ng; Chua Enlai; Bobby Tonelli; Suhaimi Yusof
- Cinematography: Amandi Wong
- Production companies: Brainchild Pictures mm2 Entertainment
- Release date: 13 November 2014
- Running time: 107 minutes
- Country: Singapore
- Languages: Mandarin; English

Wayang Boy (Chinese: 戏曲小子) is a 2014 Singaporean comedy-drama film directed by Raymond Tan, starring Denzyl Dharma, Law Kar-ying, Michelle Yim, Chantel Liu, Chen Tianwen, Kym Ng, Chua Enlai, Bobby Tonelli and Suhaimi Yusof.

== Cast ==
- Denzyl Dharma as Raja
- Law Kar-ying as Mr. Koay
- Michelle Yim
- Chantel Liu
- Chen Tianwen as Henry
- Kym Ng
- Chua Enlai
- Bobby Tonelli
- Suhaimi Yusof
- Loh Ren Jie as Xavier
- Tan Wei Tian as Shi Han

== Release ==
The film opened in theatres on 13 November 2014.

== Reception ==
Lin Mingwen of the My Paper rated the film 3 stars out of 5.

Boon Chan of The Straits Times rated the film 2.5 stars out of 5 and wrote that the film "gets bogged down with Tan framing the subject matter as one of foreigners versus Singaporeans and then piling on more of such examples."
