= True Crime: Streets of LA =

2003 video game

- Developer: Luxoflux (Note: Ported to GameCube by Exakt Entertainment, to Windows by LTI Gray Matter, to Mac OS X by Aspyr. Mobile adaptation developed by ImaginEngine.)
- Publisher: Activision (Note: Published for Mac OS X by Aspyr. Mobile adaptation published by MFORMA.)
- Producer: Bryant Bustamante
- Designers: Peter Morawiec; Richard Yeh
- Programmers: Cary Hara; Adrian Stephens; Jeff Lander; Zach Baker; Adam Morawiec; Bob Schade; Johan Köhler
- Artists: Daniel Padilla; Christopher Otcasek; Nick Marks; Kenton Draeger; Lia Tijong; Irina Polishchuk; Gabe Garrison; Dan Bickell
- Writers: Peter Morawiec; Micah Linton; Marc Goff; Richie Porter; Yael Swerdlow
- Composer: Sean Murray
- Platforms: GameCube; PlayStation 2; Xbox; Windows; Mobile; Mac OS X
- Release: November 4, 2003: GameCube, PS2, Xbox; NA: November 4, 2003; EU: November 7, 2003; EU: November 21, 2003 (GC) Windows; NA: May 18, 2004; EU: May 28, 2004 Mobile; NA: November 21, 2004 Mac OS X; NA: March 14, 2005
- Genre: Action-adventure
- Modes: Single-player, multiplayer (PC)

True Crime: Streets of LA is a 2003 open world action-adventure video game developed by Luxoflux and published by Activision for GameCube, PlayStation 2 and Xbox in November 2003, for Microsoft Windows in May 2004, and by Aspyr for Mac OS X in March 2005. A mobile phone adaptation was released in November 2004. The game tells the story of Nicholas Kang, an uncompromising LAPD detective who is recruited into the Elite Operations Division to investigate a series of bombings in Chinatown. As he delves further into the case, he discovers it may be connected to the disappearance of his police officer father 20 years prior. The game features a 240-square-mile (622 km^{2}) re-creation of a large part of L.A., including most of Beverly Hills and Santa Monica, with the majority of street names, landmarks and highways reproduced accurately.

Streets of LA received generally positive reviews and was commercially successful, selling over 3,000,000 units worldwide across all platforms. The True Crime franchise continued in 2005 with the release of True Crime: New York City.

== Gameplay ==
True Crime is an open world action-adventure game played from a third-person perspective, in which the player controls Detective Nicholas Kang of the "Elite Operations Division" (E.O.D.), a hand-picked autonomous unit of the regular LAPD.

The game was one of the first non-Grand Theft Auto open world action-adventure games released after Grand Theft Auto III (2001). It was labeled by many as a Grand Theft Auto clone, since the core game mechanics are identical to Grand Theft Auto III, and its successor, Grand Theft Auto: Vice City (2002). Much like in Grand Theft Auto, players can travel across the city freely, commandeer vehicles, do whatever they want to attack or kill innocent civilians, and progress through the storyline at their leisure. However, the major difference from Grand Theft Auto games is that in True Crime, the player controls a law enforcement officer. As such, True Crime has been called "the GTA III clone where you play a cop."

The game involves four main types of mission, each with their own unique gameplay: shooting, fighting, stealth and driving. In many levels of the game, even if missions are failed, the storyline will continue, sometimes with a different opening cutscene for the next level, with an alternate version of the level, occasionally by branching into another storyline entirely.

Precision targeting in the PlayStation 2 version of True Crime. The green reticle indicates the player can fire a non-lethal shot. On the top left of the HUD is Kang's current health and ammo. On the bottom right is his Good Cop/Bad Cop meter (he currently possesses 10 Bad Cop points). To the right of this is his badge information (he currently possesses 39 badges and 65 reward points).

During shooting missions, the game auto-targets the closest opponent. If the player wishes to switch target to another opponent, they must do so manually. When the player is in shooting mode, they can enter "Precision Targeting" at any time. At this point, the game switches to first-person, zooms in on the target, and goes into slow motion momentarily. While in Precision Targeting, if the reticle turns green, the player can hit the enemy with a neutralizing, non-lethal shot. If the player fires when the reticle is red, the enemy will be killed instantly. Players can also take cover during shootouts, firing from behind cover when the opportunity presents itself. Players are also free to pick up any weapons dropped by enemies. Once the ammo of these weapons is depleted, however, Kang will drop the weapon and revert to his standard issue revolver, which, although it needs to be reloaded, never runs out of ammo.

In hand-to-hand combat, the player has four main attacks: high kick, low kick, punch, and grapple. After hitting an enemy a certain number of times, the enemy will be stunned, at which point the player can perform a combo by pressing a series of buttons. During stealth missions, the player is automatically placed into stealth mode. The player can approach enemies from behind and either knock them out or kill them. Bumping into objects or walking over broken glass or plastic bags will cause nearby enemies to become aware of the player's presence.

Driving in True Crime. The car's health gauge is on the top left of the screen. The "Crime Alert" indicates a random crime has just happened, with the player given the option of investigating it. In the mini-map on the bottom left, the green mark indicates the current primary objective. A red mark points to the random crime.

Driving missions can involve either trying to catch another car, escape from another car or tailing another car. At all times, when the player is in a car, their car's condition is shown on-screen. If the car's health meter empties, the car is close to destruction. When another car is involved, that car's health meter will also be shown on-screen. When the player is tailing another car, a "Tail meter" will appear on-screen, with three sections and a moving arrow. If the arrow is in the top section, it means the player is too close and must slow down. If the arrow is in the bottom section, it means the player is losing the target and must speed up. As such, the player must try to keep the arrow in the middle section as much as possible. During normal driving missions, the player can solve random crimes provided by the radio dispatcher.

The player can access 24/7 facilities throughout the game to upgrade either their driving, fighting or shooting abilities. 24/7 facilities are only accessible if the player has an available "badge". Badges are earned by acquiring "Reward points"; every one-hundred reward points is converted into one badge. Entry into a 24/7 facility costs one badge, and the player must complete a challenge to earn the upgrade. If the player fails, they must spend another badge to try again. Rewards points are also necessary for the player to heal themselves at a pharmacy or have their car repaired at a garage; the number of points deducted depends on the level of damage in each case. The player earns reward points for arresting or killing criminals, solving crimes and completing missions. Points are deducted for killing civilians and failing missions.

The player also has a "Good Cop/Bad Cop" meter. If the player arrests criminals, solves crimes, shoots enemies with neutralizing shots, and knocks out opponents instead of killing them in stealth missions, they will get Good Cop points. If, however, they kill civilians, shoot criminals in the head, use weapons in hand-to-hand combat, or kill enemies in stealth missions, they will get Bad Cop points. At certain points in the game, the storyline will branch differently depending on whether the player has a Good Cop score or a Bad Cop score. If the player's Bad Cop score gets too high, civilians will begin to attack Kang. If the Bad Cop score reaches 99, other police, and eventually SWAT will attempt to kill him. The number of Good or Bad Cop points also plays a factor in determining the game's ending.

== Plot ==
"They call it the City of Angels. Funny. In my 30 years here, I haven't seen a single one. My old friend Henry Wilson used to say, people dare to dream here. He liked that about L.A. I'd say, bull, dreaming will get you killed. Maybe I was right. Nobody knows what happened to Henry all those years ago. But whatever it was, he didn't deserve it. Well, I ain't walking the beat no more. It's all new kids today, protecting the fools from the wiseguys, the crooks from the psychopaths. Henry's oldest son, Nick, of all people, is one of those kids. I hear he's a hell of a cop, but will he live to see the sunset? I don't know...and there are times I just want to tell Nick, "Give it up, kid. Go, be a lawyer or a doctor, or something." But it ain't my place. Besides, it would be a disservice to his old man. See, there are unanswered questions here, and I know that one day, someone will get to the truth. What happened to Henry was a true crime, and if there's one man who deserves to find out the truth, it's his son: Nicholas Kang Wilson. This is his story."

— Opening narration

LAPD Detective Nick Kang Wilson (voiced by Russell Wong) returns from a suspension for excessive force and is selected for the autonomous Elite Operations Division at the behest of Chief Wanda Parks (CCH Pounder), who believes he can help the E.O.D. break a case involving a series of bombings in Chinatown. Nick is partnered with Detective Rosie Velasco (Michelle Rodriguez), an ex-gangster turned cop. Rosie voices her concerns with Nick and his reputation, not wanting to work with him in the field. Nick reciprocates the feeling, preferring to work alone. Parks, however, believes E.O.D. needs all the help they can get to investigate the bombings, and suggests the two meet for food to discuss the matter and try to connect.

Suspecting the Triad is behind the bombings, Nick and Rosie meet at a Chinese food bistro to discuss the matter and the two of them working together in the field, but Nick soon stops a Triad member he sees attempting to extort the owner. The Triad member escapes after Nick beats him in a fight, but later ambushes the two outside and takes Rosie hostage at gunpoint. Rosie gets shot by the gunman trying to escape on her own, while the gunman tries to run to his waiting getaway driver. When Nick shoots the car before the gunman gets in, the driver panics and takes off, leading Nick to neutralize the other. Rosie recovers quickly and decides to let Nick work solo in the field while she provides intel from the precinct. Meanwhile, Parks puts an APB on the Triad's getaway car, which is soon spotted at a Chinese bar. Nick heads there and catches the driver, learning he works for Jimmy Fu (Keone Young), a small-time criminal. Nick confronts Fu inside his crooked imports warehouse, who explains the extortion orders are from higher up, and warns him "something big is about to go down", before they are nearly shot by a sniper. Nick manages to disable the sniper, but finds they are gone before he can arrest them. Back at the precinct, an incarcerated Fu later reveals he is working for "Big" Chong (also Keone Young), an enforcer for Triad boss "Ancient" Wu, a supposedly 300 year old crime lord who is thought by many to be a myth.

While at the precinct, Rosie learns from Sergeant George (Christopher Walken) about Kang's background: his father, Henry Wilson, was involved in a drug trafficking scandal in the 1970's when he suddenly disappeared; Internal Affairs deduced Wilson fled the city, but George never believed it, believing Henry was to much of a straight cop to suddenly go rogue. Meanwhile, Nick tails Chong and sees him bringing large amounts of money into a building owned by Cyprus Holdings, a company linked to the Russian mafia. Nick then follows Chong to a spa, where he observes him meeting a Russian named "Rocky" (Gary Oldman). Rocky complains Chong is not laundering the money from Chinatown quickly enough; Chong tells Rocky that Ancient Wu is unhappy with the whole affair, but Rocky is unconcerned, warning Chong that "The General" is in town looking for the money. Chong retorts that The General is only Rocky's problem, and warns the police are all over them. Nick takes the opportunity to reveal himself and confront them: Rocky escapes, but Nick neutralizes Chong.

Back at the precinct, Parks introduces Nick to FBI Agent Paul Masterson (also Gary Oldman). An upset Masterson explains the FBI was investigating Rocky and had the spa under surveillance, but since Nick's raid, Rocky has vanished. While Masterson is initially assertive that he is now leading the investigation and will not tolerate Nick's loose-cannon style, he relents under Parks' advice, and apprehensively allows Nick to find Rocky on his own terms. Later, Parks fills Rosie in on more of Nick's backstory: after Henry disappeared, Nick and his brother Cary Kang, (Ryun Yu) moved to Hong Kong to live with their deceased mother's relatives, changing their surname from Wilson to Kang to try to fit in. However, both were shunned and often antagonized by the local kids for being half-white and eventually returned to L.A.; Cary opened a franchise of martial arts dojos, while Nick went on to become a cop, presumably in hopes of learning his father's true fate and clearing his name.

Nick later attempts to interrogate Francis, a mechanic and arms trafficker for the Russian mob, about Rocky's whereabouts. Francis briefly escapes, but is soon caught and arrested. Back at the precinct, Francis explains that he's never dealt with Rocky personally, but suggests Nick investigate a Russian-owned club in Hollywood, The Gulag. While observing the club, Nick sees a suspicious Hollywood detective leaving the building. After sneaking in and eventually fighting through the Russian goons operating the club, Nick meets Rocky in his office. Rocky shows off that the money the Triad are laundering for him is counterfeit, and of exceptionally high quality and accuracy to normal money. Rocky then threatens Nick to back off his investigation, playing a voicemail from Cary's dojo where the Triads are actively beating him and vandalizing the dojo. Nick races to Cary's dojo to save him, but the dojo itself is ransacked and Cary is nowhere to be found.

Nick later finds and trails the detective from the club, but somehow loses him when investigating a homeless flophouse he entered. Soon after fighting the belligerent bums, Nick finds a note on his car's windshield left by the detective, who offers to meet him at a diner. At the diner, the detective introduces himself to Nick as Don Rafferty (Michael Madsen), who explains he was an old friend of Henry's, and was tasked by Henry to watch over Nick and Cary if something were to happen to him. He warns Nick that the case he is working on is over his head, but tells him that Rocky is holding Cary at The Peking Duck, a Triad-operated butcher shop. Nick claims he intends to question Rafferty on how he knows this info before racing to the butcher shop. Nick fights through the Triads at the shop and eventually rescues Cary, escaping in a commandeered pick-up truck from the pursuing Triads. Nick decides to speak with Ancient Wu to get answers and confront him for threatening his family, heading to a Chinese restaurant supposedly owned by Wu to do so. In what may be a dream, Nick discovers the restaurant leads to a network of secret tunnels underneath Chinatown, and fights his way through a horde of zombies dwelling inside before he meets Ancient Wu (James Hong), who is, in fact, over 300 years old. Wu makes Nick undergo a series of tests, including battling fire-demons, his personal concubines, and a dragon, before giving him info on Rocky. Wu eventually reveals that Rocky, real name Rasputin Kuznetsov, was a KGB agent in the U.S. who betrayed the USSR in the 1970's for a life of crime. Wu also hints that Rafferty may be working with Rocky, but Wu escapes before Nick can get more information.

Believing Nick has lost his mind after reporting his experience with the Ancient Wu incident, Masterson fires him and issues a warrant for his arrest. Nick confronts Rafferty at a bar and beats him to learn about his connection with Rocky, but the barkeep fights Nick for assaulting Rafferty. After beating the barkeep and tailing Rafferty soon after, Nick manages to escape some FBI agents sent by Masterson to arrest him. Nick later tails Rafferty and Rocky's girlfriend, Jill (Grey DeLisle), to a warehouse. Nick overhears Rafferty and Jill try to convince Rocky that they should all lay low due to Nick's investigation, but Rocky rebuffs them and smacks Jill in anger, claiming he will deal with Nick like he dealt with Henry. Rafferty protests that he never wanted Henry killed, and urges Rocky to not kill Nick as well. Nick blows his cover and attacks them in rage, but both Rocky and Rafferty escape in the subsequent gunfight. Nick holds one of Rocky's surviving goons at gunpoint for Rocky's location: the goon claims Rocky doesn't tell them about where he goes, but suggests he find Jill, who Rocky tells everything to.

Nick finds Jill at a diner later at night, who offers to give him info on Rocky as revenge for her smacking him. She explains that Rocky is returning to The Gulag soon at 11 PM to collect some valuables, and Nick rushes to get there in time. Once inside the club, however, Nick is ambushed by some of Rocky's goons in a trap set up by Jill, but defeats them all in hand-to-hand combat. Holding one of the goons at gunpoint for Rocky's location, Nick learns Rocky is at Hangar 6 of the Santa Monica Airport. While observing the hangar, Jill catches Nick off-guard and knocks him out with a tranquilizer pistol. Waking up handcuffed to a chair in the hangar, Nick finds that he has been captured by Rocky and Rafferty. Rocky explains that in the 1970's, he and Rafferty were smuggling cocaine into L.A., but Henry found out; the pair tried to pay him off, but he refused, so Rocky shot him and dumped his body in the ocean, while Rafferty planted cocaine to make Henry look dirty. Wu somehow telepathically communicates with Nick, urging him to get revenge for his father, and magically disables his handcuffs to discreetly free him. Rocky reveals that he has already made $1 billion in counterfeit money in the hangar, plans to make more after fleeing the country, and intends to kill Nick so he can no longer interfere. Just before Rocky is about to shoot Nick with a handgun, a repentant Rafferty jumps in the way of the bullet, saving Nick's life at the cost of his own. This distracts Rocky long enough for Nick to hit Rocky with the chair he was in and knock him out. After commandeering Rocky's handguns for himself, Nick finds a group of masked commandos have entered the hangar, initially believing them to be SWAT. However, when they suddenly train their guns on him, Nick has to fight his way out of the hangar.

After defeating the commandos and escaping outside, Nick finds that Rocky somehow got out as well, and is attempting to pilot a private jet to escape. Nick commandeers a nearby sports car and shoots Rocky's jet, dealing enough damage to the turbines to cause the jet to explode. Rocky survives the initial explosion, but subsequently burns to death from the fire. Nick is then confronted by Korean People's Army General Han Yu Kim (Mako), the true mastermind behind the counterfeit and laundering scam, and the leader of the commandos Nick fought. Kim reveals the counterfeit money comes from North Korea, as their government has the same money presses as the US Treasury, explaining the high quality of the dupes. Kim also explains the counterfeit money was meant to boost North Korea's economy and protect it against what he describes as "economic manipulation by America and its cronies"; He intended to have Rocky, the Russian Mob, and the Triads launder the money to North Korea so as to not implicate North Korea itself in a potentially international affair, but Rocky's greed led him to betray Kim and keep the money for himself. Kim had trouble tracking Rocky down for revenge, but Nick's work allowed him to eventually locate Rocky and the money, and with Rocky now dead, Nick is the only person blocking his plans to use the money for his army. The two engage in grueling hand-to-hand combat while inside the still-burning carcass of the jet, but Nick eventually emerges victorious, remarking out loud that he hopes he made his father proud. Parks, Rosie, and Masterson soon arrive afterward, with Parks accidentally knocking out an angry Masterson by opening her car door on him. Parks and Rosie congratulate Nick, with the latter jokingly offering dinner for them at the Chinese bistro from the beginning of the story; the pair subsequently rebuff him and leave. As Nick drives away while police arrive on the scene, George narrates that Nick's success not only posthumously proved his father's innocence, but also cemented his belief that Nick truly is his father's son.

== Development ==
The game was first announced on May 15, 2002, when Activision revealed Luxoflux were developing an "original action-racing game inspired by Hong Kong action films" for PlayStation 2, Xbox and GameCube. According to Larry Goldberg, executive vice president of Activision Worldwide Studios,

Mission-based driving and action-adventure collide in this bold new direction for interactive entertainment. Infused with the unique flair of Hong Kong action films, True Crime: Streets of LA allows players to experience first-hand the car stunts, close calls, quick wit and high-action that are synonymous with this distinct style of cinema.

Activision stated the game combined the gameplay of beat 'em ups, third-person shooters, and vehicular combat games, and would include over twenty branching missions and multiple endings. They also revealed the game would recreate 400 square miles (1,036 km^{2}) of Los Angeles, and the player would be able to visit multiple LA landmarks. Although only 40% complete, True Crime was first shown at the 2002 E3 event in May, where it was slated for an April 2003 release. Activision emphasized the geographical accuracy of the game's Los Angeles, as well as the different styles of gameplay.

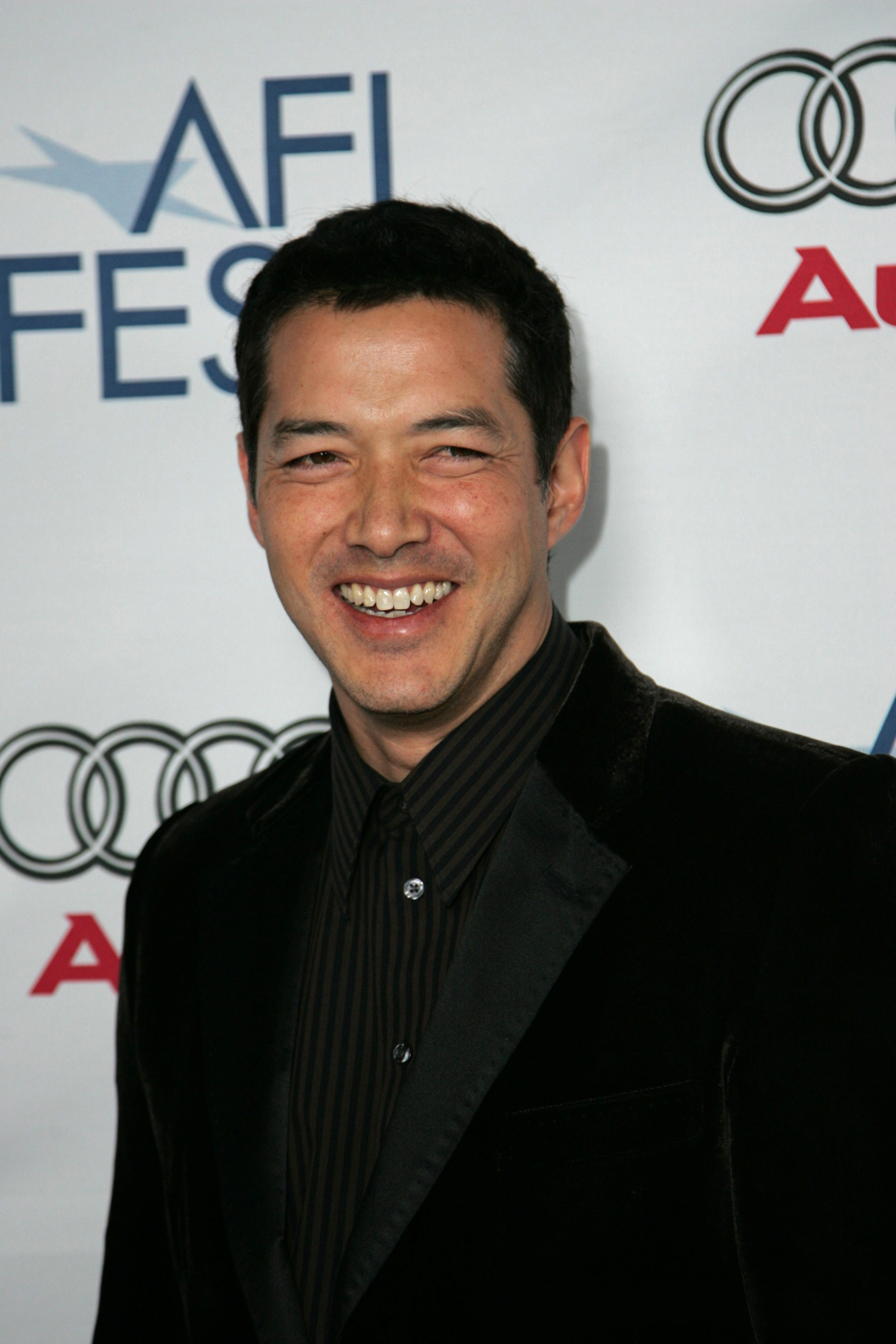
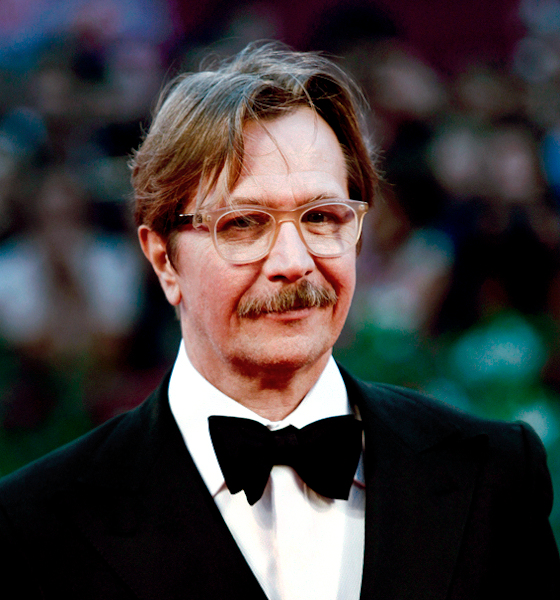
Russell Wong (left) and Gary Oldman (right) play Nicholas Kang and Rocky, the game's protagonist and main antagonist, respectively.

In December, Activision showed a 60% complete version of the game. They revealed the size of the game's Los Angeles had been reduced to roughly 300 square miles (777 km^{2}). To recreate the city, the developers used commercial satellite imaging, GPS technology and traditional photographs, with the in-game city stretching from the Hollywood Hills to Downtown to Santa Monica to Marina del Rey. They also revealed details of the branching plot, with many levels having two or three opening cutscenes, depending on what the player has done in previous levels. They stressed it would be rare for the player to find a "Game Over" screen; usually a failed mission will simply lead to a later level by way of a different path than had the player completed the mission successfully. They also revealed the game would have three alternate endings, and that the player could play through the game multiple times, experiencing a different narrative and different levels each time. They also announced the game would feature roughly one-hundred randomly occurring crimes that the player has the option of solving while driving around the city. The "Good Cop/Bad Cop" system was also shown for the first time, although it was still in a rudimentary state of development. The casting of Russell Wong as protagonist Nick Kang and Gary Oldman as the game's main villain was also announced.

In April 2003, Activision announced the main cast of voice actors; as well as Russell Wong and Gary Oldman, the game would also feature Christopher Walken, CCH Pounder, James Hong, Mako, Ron Perlman and Keone Young. Several days later, Michelle Rodriguez and Michael Madsen were also added to the cast. The cast was formed and directed by Margaret Tang with Rik Schaffer working on VO engineering, recording, editing and designing voice effects.

The game recreates 240 square miles (622 km^{2}) of Los Angeles.

The game was next shown at the 2003 E3 event in May. Although not a final build, both IGN and GameSpot were impressed. IGN's Sam Bishop wrote "it's clear that Luxoflux isn't trying to bust out a quick and dirty Grand Theft Auto clone." GameSpot's Jeff Gertsmann praised the integration of gameplay types, writing "The interesting part is how well all these game mechanics mesh together to form a mission-driven yet open-ended game." During the show, Activision again announced the size of the game's city had been decreased, this time to 240 square miles (622 km^{2}). However, they also announced that over one-hundred landmarks in LA were featured in the game, in their exact geographical locations, such as the Los Angeles Convention Center and the Staples Center.

In the build-up to the release of the game, Activision announced True Crime would be ported to mobile by Mforma. On October 22, they sent the final build of the game to gaming websites. Several days later, they confirmed rumors that Snoop Dogg was an unlockable character, with his own mission and car. They also announced they had signed an exclusive licensing deal with Puma; Kang would be wearing several pieces from Puma's Fall 2003 catalogue. Barney Waters, marketing director for Puma North America stated "Video gaming is a phenomenon with a diverse appeal. From the skate kids, to the hipsters and fashionistas, gaming is the common denominator to a widespread audience, and a distinctive medium for Puma to utilize to interact with consumers."

=== Lawsuit ===
In late October 2003, two weeks prior to the game's scheduled release of November 4, novelist Robert Crais claimed that the game's protagonist, Nicholas Kang, was a direct copy of the protagonist of many of Crais' novels, Elvis Cole. Crais filed a lawsuit which claimed "True Crime is substantially similar to the Elvis Cole novels," and accused Activision of copying "protectable expressions". The suit sought for an injunction to prevent Activision from shipping the game, for undisclosed monetary damages, and for the "destruction of all infringing works".

The lawsuit failed to prevent the scheduled release of the game, and on November 6, Crais dropped the complaint entirely. After reviewing Luxoflux's development materials for the game, Crais was satisfied lead designer Peter Morawiec had not copied the character of Kang from that of Cole, but was in fact a fan of Crais and was paying homage to his work. Shortly thereafter, Crais released a statement on his official website in which he wrote,

Activision's and Luxoflux's open and honorable response both surprised and impressed me. They allowed me and my lawyers full access to a special unlocked pre-release version of the game, provided a complete game script, flowcharts of game action, and provided all-important clarifications to statements that had been attributed to Mr. Morawiec (turns out the guy was a fan of my work, and was simply expressing his admiration). In short, they did a damned fine job of defusing what could have been an ugly situation. Based upon our review of those materials, we have concluded that Activision has not infringed upon my copyrights. Accordingly, I have dismissed the lawsuit against all parties. I want to thank Activision, Luxoflux, and Mr. Morawiec for the cooperative nature in which they brought the case to a quick conclusion. Cynics please note: No money exchanged hands. And, lastly, be advised that I spent several hours reviewing this amazing game. It rocks.

=== PC port ===
The PC port was first announced by Activision on January 29, 2004, although no details were given on who would be porting it, or when it was slated for release. The only solid information was that it would feature an online multiplayer component. More details were revealed on February 18. The game was being ported by LTI Gray Matter, and would feature five different online gaming modes: "Street Racing" (racing customizable cars), "Dojo Master" (fighting in teams or individually), "Battle Master" (same as Dojo Master but with weaponry), "The Beat" (four players compete to make the most arrests in a set time) and "Chase Mode" (one player plays as a criminal and tries to avoid being caught by the other players, who play as police). The port would also feature several new weapons, enhanced graphics, thirty additional songs not in the console versions, and PC-optimized controls.

In March, Activision announced the PC version would also feature character skins not found in the console versions, mainly characters from other Activision games; Pitfall: The Lost Expedition, Vampire: The Masquerade – Bloodlines (both 2004), Call of Duty (2003), and the Tony Hawk's and Tenchu series. Later in March, more details were announced about the game's new soundtrack. Thirty-two additional licensed tracks were being added, mainly rock tracks from artists such as Alice in Chains, Queensrÿche, Spineshank and Stone Sour. On April 14, Activision showcased an almost finalized build of the game at a gaming event in San Francisco. IGN's Dan Adams praised the superior graphics and PC-specific controls. The port went gold on May 3.

== Soundtrack ==
True Crime: Streets of LA

Soundtrack album by Various
- Released: November 11, 2003
- Genres: Gangsta rap; Hardcore hip-hop; West Coast hip-hop
- Length: 1:15:07
- Labels: Vybe Squad Ent.; Koch
- Producers: Battlecat; Damizza; DJ Quik; Warren G; King Tech, Bigg Swoop (executive producer)

Professional ratings
Review scores
Source	Rating
AllMusic	3/5 stars
IGN	7.5/10

True Crime: Streets of LA: The Soundtrack was released on November 11, 2003, for Vybe Squad Ent. and Koch Records. The album was produced by Bigg Swoop, Battlecat, Damizza, DJ Quik, Warren G and King Tech.

Activision first revealed details about the game's soundtrack on September 2, 2003, when they announced the game would feature over fifty original tracks from artists such as Snoop Dogg, Westside Connection, E-40, Kam, Lil Eazy, Lil' ½ Dead, Bad Azz, Damizza, Jayo Felony, Bigg Swoop, as well as licensed tracks from artists such as Ice-T, the D.O.C. and N.E.R.D. Chris Archer, executive producer at Activision Worldwide Studios stated, "True Crime: Streets of LA represents the largest collection of original West Coast hip hop music ever assembled. The collision of the game's intense action with the pulse pounding sounds from the powerhouses of urban music will elevate video game soundtracks to a whole new standard." Bright Riley, CEO of Vybe Squad, stated "This album marks the first time that the entire west coast is joining forces to create some of the hottest flows L.A. has to offer." On October 15, Activision announced full details of the soundtrack, which would feature twenty tracks.

AllMusic's Heather Phares scored the soundtrack 3 out of 5, writing "True Crime is something of an achievement when it comes to gathering popular music in support of a video game." She concluded "It's not a perfect soundtrack, but True Crime is entertaining enough to please gaming and non-gaming rap fans alike." IGN's Spence D scored the soundtrack 7.5 out of 10, writing "Where The Streets of LA: The Soundtrack really succeeds is in the fact that the 20 track album features all new material written specifically for the game." He concluded "The most interesting thing is that for all intents and purposes the West Coast gangsta scene, musically speaking, has more or less run its course, succumbing to the bling and blitz of the Dirty South. But this album proves that it's still alive and well. Whatever your take on the gunz-n-thugs mentality may be, one thing can't be denied: the 20 tracks included here are rife with game, style, and serious funktafication."

The soundtrack peaked at No. 100 on the Top R&B/Hip-Hop Albums and No. 42 on the Independent Albums chart. The soundtrack was nominated for "Best Soundtrack From a Video Game" at MTV's 2004 Video Music Awards, losing to Tony Hawk's Underground.

Track listing
No.	Title	Performer	Length
1.	"Dance wit Me"	Snoop Dogg	2:57
2.	"Terrorist Threat"	Westside Connection	2:29
3.	"Don't Fight the Pimpin'"	Suga Free	3:07
4.	"What U Wanna Do"	Warren G feat. RBX	4:08
5.	"True Crime Remix [The New West Edition]"	Young Dre the Truth and Bishop Lamont	4:06
6.	"I'll Do Anything"	Damizza and N.U.N.E.	3:18
7.	"Thug Night (Let Me See Something)"	Jayo Felony	4:17
8.	"Hollywood"	Bizzy Bone	4:20
9.	"Drinks in the Air"	Hollywood	3:11
10.	"Don't Do the Crime"	Kam feat. Above the Law	4:17
11.	"Legends"	Boo-Yaa T.R.I.B.E.	3:54
12.	"They Don't Know"	Dee Dimes and Bigg Swoop	3:47
13.	"Flow"	Sly Boogy	4:04
14.	"This Is How We Live"	Lil' ½ Dead, Kon-Troversy and Quicktomac	4:24
15.	"We Don't Stop"	Soul Star	3:27
16.	"Can't Fuck With Us"	Big Tray Deee feat. Mr. Short Khop and Threat	4:23
17.	"Do Time"	Pomona City Rydaz and Lil' ½ Dead	4:02
18.	"Roll wit Me"	Young Billionaires	3:08
19.	"Cali Folks"	Stylistik	4:06
20.	"Get Crackin'"	Lil Eazy	3:42
Total length:			1:15:07

== Reception ==
Reception

Aggregate score
Aggregator	Score			
Aggregator	GameCube	PC	PS2	Xbox
Metacritic	77/100	68/100	77/100	77/100

Review scores
Publication	Score			
Publication	GameCube	PC	PS2	Xbox
Eurogamer			7/10	
Game Informer	8/10		8.5/10	
GameSpot	7.2/10	6.3/10	7.2/10	7.2/10
GameSpy	4/5	3/5	4/5	4/5
IGN	9/10	8/10	9/10	9/10
Nintendo Power	4/5			
Official U.S. PlayStation Magazine			2/5	
Official Xbox Magazine (US)				6.8/10
PC Gamer (US)		49%		

Award
Publication	Award
Spike Video Game Awards	Best Action Game (2003)

True Crime: Streets of LA received "generally favorable reviews". The PlayStation 2 version holds an aggregate score of 77 out of 100 on Metacritic, based on thirty-nine reviews; the Xbox version 77 out of 100, based on twenty-five reviews; the GameCube version 77 out of 100, based on twenty-nine reviews; and the PC version 68 out of 100, based on thirty-one reviews.

IGN's Aaron Boulding scored the console versions 9 out of 10, giving the game an "Editor's Choice" award. The GameCube version was also the runner-up in the November 2003 "GameCube Game of the Month" award, losing to Prince of Persia: The Sands of Time. Boulding wrote "the greatest strength of this Luxoflux game is the integration of story and layers of game design into one cohesive package." He praised the gameplay, especially the Good Cop/Bad Cop system and the upgrades system. He also praised the absence of loading screens. However, he wrote of the graphics, "there are far too many clipping issues that come up far too often to be ignored. Similarly, the camera ties into the clipping problems so that there will be times when the camera will float through and behind a wall or tree during a fight so that you can't see the action at all." He concluded "True Crime is an enjoyable game if you can clear your mind of Grand Theft Auto expectations [...] It's a lot of fun despite the burden of the camera system and other technical glitches. It doesn't, nor should it, replace Grand Theft Auto by any means. True Crime has enough good to counter the bad and stand on its own." Boulding and Tom McNamara scored the PC version 8 out of 10, writing "the multiplayer that many of us have been salivating for is almost disorientingly low-budget." They were also critical of the controls and graphics, concluding "the rich fighting component and the shooting and driving mechanics aren't translated well to the PC, with awkward controls, poor texture quality, and odd visual bugs. Plus, multiplayer, the hot magnet exclusive to the PC version, is decidedly half-baked."

Game Informer's Andrew Reiner scored the PlayStation 2 version 8.5 out of 10, writing "True Crime is the first game to come along and truly give the Grand Theft Auto series a run for its money." However, he also wrote "a number of roadblocks hold True Crime back from achieving greatness [...] The game has amazing variety. Unfortunately, none of these individual components feel particularly polished." Of the protagonist, he wrote "Nick Kang is quite easily the most annoying new character in video games." He concluded "It's not nearly as good as GTA, but entertaining nonetheless." Justin Leeper scored the GameCube version 8 out of 10, writing "this is the worst of the three console versions of this title. Fortunately, it's still pretty darn good." Of the graphics, he wrote "the replication of LA suffers from some of the worst pop-up I've seen in a game."

GameSpy's Russ Fischer scored the console versions 4 out of 5, writing "there's more to True Crime than GTA emulation." Of the graphics, he wrote, "the rendering of L.A. is superb -- simply put, there's not a better real-world model in gaming [...] The problem is with the camera, which has some real problems in tight quarters. There are also occasional clipping issues." He concluded "The problems can't tear down the fact that True Crime really does create its own identity." Joel Durham Jr. scored the PC version 3 out of 5, writing "while it manages to retain the overall appeal of the original, the complaints hold true, with a few new ones that cropped up along the way." He was critical of the controls, calling them "unresponsive and clunky." He was also critical of multiplayer mode; "Multiplayer True Crime is about as reliable as Pacific Gas and Electric." He concluded "the gameplay of True Crime is hampered by a host of negatives. It's a fun game, but it's hard to recommend to hardcore PC gamers -- you'll need a strong appreciation of console gaming to embrace it."

GameSpot's Jeff Gerstmann scored the console versions 7.2 out of 10, writing "the game's strong production values aren't backed up by an equally compelling story or game." He called Nicholas Kang "completely unlikeable" and "an unnecessarily cocky jerk." However, he also wrote, "in terms of its presentation, True Crime delivers quite well. The graphics are very sharp and are most impressive when you're out on the road. Los Angeles looks startlingly realistic, right down to the maze of freeway on- and off-ramps." He concluded "True Crime is a game that simply lacks polish and, in some cases, feels unfinished. It makes decent attempts with its different styles of gameplay, but none of them are particularly well done." He scored the PC version 6.3 out of 10, writing "the game's transition from console to PC wasn't handled as smoothly as you might have expected, thus leaving a game that was already a little uneven feeling a little broken in some spots." He called the controls "pretty terrible" and argued "the fact that the PC version doesn't have any sort of gamepad support certainly doesn't help." He was also critical of the graphics, writing "True Crime looks like a PlayStation 2 game that's been ported up, touched up a little bit, and shipped." He called the multiplayer mode "ill-conceived", arguing "the online mode actually detracts from the overall package rather than enhancing it."

Eurogamer's Tom Bramwell scored the PlayStation 2 version 7 out of 10, writing "although comparisons with GTA III and its multi-million-selling sequel are inevitable, True Crime actually does a good job of setting out its own stall." He was critical of the graphics, citing "low-resolution textures, some clipping issues, a rather horrible depth of field effect and a lack of screen-filling vistas." He called Nicholas Kang "one of the most unlikeable folks I've ever had the displeasure of thumbing around a third-person action game". However, he also wrote "The fact is that there's just something compelling about the game - and it's not any particular element over another - it's just something about the cohesiveness of the whole thing." He concluded "True Crime is this year's The Getaway - it's not GTA and it will frustrate for some on that basis, but it's a respectable enough game in its own right."

Official U.S. PlayStation Magazine's John Davison scored the PlayStation 2 version 2 out of 5. He was highly critical of both the script and the storyline, and found the gameplay "boring". He wrote, "The overall experience starts off weak and deteriorates quickly. There's a fair amount of violence against women, which is disturbing." He concluded "This is a bad game. The fact that it was so ambitious just amplifies that fact. It's like a big-budget Hollywood flick gone horribly wrong."

=== Sales and awards ===
The game was a commercial success. During its first two weeks upon release in North America, it sold over 300,000 units across all platforms. By the end of its first month, it had sold over 600,000 units. By July 2006, the PlayStation 2 version of True Crime had sold 1.5 million units and earned $65 million in the United States. Next Generation ranked it as the 27th highest-selling game launched for the PlayStation 2, Xbox or GameCube between January 2000 and July 2006 in that country. Combined sales of True Crime console games reached 2.8 million units in the United States by July 2006. In the United Kingdom, the PlayStation 2 version received a "Platinum" sales award from the Entertainment and Leisure Software Publishers Association (ELSPA), indicating sales of at least 300,000 units. Ultimately, the game went on to sell over 3 million units worldwide across all platforms.

At the 2003 Spike Video Game Awards, True Crime was nominated for five awards; "Best Action Game", "Best Animation", "Best Music", and two "Best Performance by a Human" nominations (Christopher Walken as George and Snoop Dogg as himself). It won Best Action Game, but lost in the other categories; Best Animation was given to Dead or Alive Xtreme Beach Volleyball, Best Music to Def Jam Vendetta and Best Performance by a Human to Ray Liotta in Grand Theft Auto: Vice City. It was also nominated for "Most Innovative Story Design – Interactive Media", and Snoop Dogg was nominated for "Outstanding Character from an Interactive Media" at the 2004 Satellite Awards; it lost in the first category to XIII, while Snoop Dogg lost to Ray Liotta's performance in Vice City. It was also nominated for the "Technical Achievement" award at the 1st British Academy Games Awards in 2004, losing to EyeToy: Play. During the 7th Annual Interactive Achievement Awards, True Crime received nominations for "Outstanding Achievement in Licensed Soundtrack" and "Outstanding Achievement in Character Performance – Male" for Snoop Dogg's vocal portrayal of himself.
