= Supercar Street Challenge =

2001 video game

- Cover art featuring a Saleen S7
- Developer: Exakt Entertainment
- Publisher: Activision
- Platforms: PlayStation 2, Windows
- Release: NA: 7 November 2001; EU: 30 November 2001
- Genres: Racing, Simulation video game
- Modes: Single-player, multiplayer

Supercar Street Challenge is a racing video game developed by Exakt Entertainment and published by Activision for PlayStation 2 and Windows in 2001.

== Gameplay ==
In this game, the player has the power to design, build, and race their own dream car. They can choose their car from the Saleen S7 to the Lotus Concept Vehicle M220 to the Callaway C12; customize their own vehicle in the Steve Saleen Styling Studio; and race down the environments in London, Paris, Monaco, Los Angeles, Munich, Rome, and Turin.

== Reception ==
Reception

Aggregate score
Aggregator	Score	
Aggregator	PC	PS2
Metacritic	45/100	57/100

Review scores
Publication	Score	
Publication	PC	PS2
Computer Games Magazine	3.5/5	N/A
Computer Gaming World	2/5	N/A
Famitsu	N/A	26/40
Game Informer	N/A	6/10
GamePro	N/A	3.5/5
GameRevolution	N/A	D−
GameSpot	3.9/10	5.8/10
GameSpy	N/A	65%
GameZone	4.5/10	7.9/10
IGN	4.9/10	5.7/10
Next Generation	N/A	3/5
Official U.S. PlayStation Magazine	N/A	2.5/5
PC Gamer (US)	40%	N/A

The PlayStation 2 version received "mixed" reviews, while the PC version received "generally unfavorable reviews", according to the review aggregation website Metacritic. Scott Steinberg of Next Generation said the former console version had "Standard automotive thrills with a mildly amusing twist – vehicle design options." In Japan, where said console version was ported and published by Success on 21 November 2002, Famitsu gave it a score of 26 out of 40.
