= Exakt Entertainment =

American video game development company

- Industry: Video games
- Founded: 1999
- Defunct: 2010
- Fate: Dormancy
- Headquarters: Los Angeles, California, United States
- Website: EXAKT Entertainment

Exakt Entertainment was an American video game developer, founded in 1999, based in Los Angeles, California.

== Games developed ==
List of games developed by Exakt as of 2017
| Year | Game | Platform(s) |
|---|---|---|
| 2001 | Supercar Street Challenge | PlayStation 2, Microsoft Windows |
| 2002 | X-Men: Next Dimension | GameCube |
| 2003 | True Crime: Streets of LA | GameCube |
| 2004 | Call of Duty: Finest Hour | GameCube |
| 2005 | True Crime: New York City | Xbox, GameCube |
| 2006 | Call of Duty 3 | Wii |
| 2008 | Call of Duty: World at War | Wii |
| 2009 | Trixel | iOS |
| 2009 | Abuse Classic | iOS |
