= Wrath Unleashed =

2004 video game

- North American PlayStation 2 cover art
- Developer: The Collective
- Publisher: LucasArts
- Director: Gary Priest
- Producers: Douglas Hare; Cordy Rierson
- Designers: James Farley; Garrett Smith
- Programmers: Nathan Hunt; William Feng Chen; Mike Singleton
- Artists: Daniel Mycka; Brian Horton
- Composer: Jack Wall
- Platforms: PlayStation 2, Xbox
- Release: NA: February 10, 2004; PAL: March 5, 2004
- Genre: Strategy
- Modes: Single player, multiplayer

Wrath Unleashed is a strategy game for the PlayStation 2 and the Xbox created by The Collective and published by LucasArts in 2004.

== Gameplay ==
Wrath Unleashed is a chess-like game that combines strategy with combat. In the game, the player chooses a god and attempts to claim the territory of another god with their army of mythical creatures, which move over a "board" of hexagonal spaces (each space representing a type of terrain). When two opposing troops occupy the same hexagonal space, gameplay shifts to an arena, where the troops must battle to the death for the right to occupy the space. The goal of the game is to position troops over spaces which contain the enemy's temples.

The characters in Wrath Unleashed are divided into Light (good) and Darkness (evil), as well as Order (intelligence, thought) and Chaos (combat, battle). Each faction of characters has the power of a specific element. All playable characters are able to heal their troops, teleport troops across the board, and destroy nearby enemies.

- Water Demigoddess Aenna (voiced by Vanessa Marshall) - Aenna is the goddess of Water, and is as "pure as crashing waves and waterfalls". Aenna wields power over the Elements of Water and Ice. As a goddess of the Light Order, she represents enlightenment and wisdom. Through her teachings, feral ogres are able to focus their rage into powerful magic. Aenna is in love with the god Epothos. Her color is blue.
- Fire Demigod Epothos (voiced by Ron Yuan) - Epothos is the god of Fire, and is "a volcanic warrior with the fury of the Sun". Epothos wields power over the Elements of Fire and Magma. As a god of the Light Chaos, he represents courage and valor in combat. Epothos forged his warriors, the Fire Giants, in the core of a volcano. His color is red.
- Earth Demigod Durlock (voiced by Rafael Ferrer) - Durlock is the god of Earth, and is as "cold as he is calculating". Durlock wields power over the Elements of Earth and Metal. He forged his warriors from iron. As a god of the Dark Order, he represents treachery and deception. Durlock is in love with the goddess Aenna. His color is green.
- Wind Demigoddess Helamis (voiced by Jennifer Hale) - Helamis is the goddess of Wind, and is as "merciless as her hurricanes". Helamis wields power over the Elements of Wind and Lightning. As a goddess of the Dark Chaos, she represents the cruelty and horrors of war. She released the demonic Cyclops from its underworld prison. She believes that she can lure Epothos to her side with her seductive charms. Her color is purple.

== Plot ==
A nameless narrator (voiced by Mako Iwamatsu) introduces the conflict: "In the beginning, there was only darkness. Then light shown in the void, and a new world was born. A realm forged from the elemental forces of earth, wind, water, and fire. The nexus of an eternal war waged between the forces of light and darkness, between chaos and order, which destroyed the world in a mighty cataclysm. Unto this broken realm came the overlords: Beautiful Aenna, Goddess of the Waters. Steadfast purity of crashing waves and thundering waterfalls. Fiery Epothos, Warrior of the Rising Sun. Volatile guardian of the sacred flame. Devious Durlock, Master of Metals, and Lord of Stone! Keeper of the secrets of the earth! And Wicked Helamis! Queen of Storms and Chaos, mother of hurricanes, leaving havoc and destruction in her wake. Now the mightiest of the overlords prepare for the ultimate confrontation, the time has come for the Wrath of the Gods to be UNLEASHED!"

The game features campaigns for each of the four characters, at varying difficulties, following their story of achieving domination of the realm.

== Development ==
LucasArts acquired the publishing rights to Wrath Unleashed (known then as Wrath) in 2002.

== Reception ==
Reception

Aggregate score
Aggregator	Score	
Aggregator	PS2	Xbox
Metacritic	64/100	69/100

Review scores
Publication	Score	
Publication	PS2	Xbox
Electronic Gaming Monthly	5.17/10 (Note: Three critics of Electronic Gaming Monthly gave both console versions each a score of 4/10, 7/10, and 4.5/10.)	5.17/10
Game Informer	6/10	7.5/10
GameRevolution	C−	C−
GameSpot	7.3/10	7.3/10
GameSpy	3/5	3/5
GameZone	7.4/10	7.5/10
IGN	7.6/10	7.8/10
Official U.S. PlayStation Magazine	1.5/5	N/A
Official Xbox Magazine (US)	N/A	7/10
X-Play	N/A	3/5
Playboy	50%	50%

Wrath Unleashed received "mixed or average reviews" on both platforms according to the review aggregation website Metacritic. Star Dingo of GamePro said of the Xbox version, "If either half of Wrath Unleashed had been more fully formed, the game would have been easy to recommend, but as it stands, half a fighting game and half a strategy game does not make a whole game. Seek out Magic: The Gathering – Battlegrounds for a much more well-blended mix of brainpower and reflex." (Note: GamePro gave the Xbox version 3.5/5 for graphics, and three 3/5 scores for sound, control, and fun factor.)
