= Cages (film) =

- Official Film Poster
- Directed by: Graham Streeter
- Written by: Graham Streeter
- Produced by: Joshua Wong; TaniaSng; Frank Cody; Hari Chembukave; Cindy Gallop
- Starring: Mako Iwamatsu; Tan Kheng Hua; Zelda Rubinstein; Bobby Tonelli; Dickson Tan; Asrani
- Cinematography: Mark Lapwood
- Edited by: Frameworks
- Music by: Roger Bourland
- Distributed by: Golden Village Theaters (Theatrical); Hallmark Channel (TV); Perles Ent. Group (Worldwide)
- Release dates: 2005 (Busan); 22 March 2007 (Singapore)
- Running time: 90 minutes
- Country: Singapore
- Language: English

Cages is a 2005 film, directed by American film director Graham Streeter which tells the story of a single mother named Ali Tan (Tan Kheng Hua) who attempts to escape repeated bad relationships which puts her before the man she resents the most—her father, Tan (Mako Iwamatsu). The truth is not always easy to face when her father reveals a dark secret 20 years past; a past that may cost a lifetime of relationship.

== Plot ==
After a fall-out with her recent boyfriend Ethan, Ali, a single mother, finds herself broke, desperate and homeless. In an effort to care for her blind son Jonah, she reluctantly seeks out the only living relative she knows, her father, Tan. To earn enough money to be on her own she accepts a job in her father's bird shop, but not without the resistance of the shop's manager Liz, a manipulative and protective middle-aged British woman.

While Liz and Ali clash at every glance, Tan begins to bond with his new grandson, teaching him about the beauty of Singapore's traditional songbird culture.

For the first time, Jonah crawls out of his shell and finds a connection with the outside world, drawing him further from his mother's hold, and deeper into Tan's world. Ali's soon finds herself caught in a double-edged scenario, as she realizes her father has a powerful and profound effect on her son.

After great deliberation, Ali decides to let Tan and Jonah bond, but just as she feared, Tan mysteriously becomes cold and distant. As a result, Ali's feelings of childhood rejection resurface, sending her into a quest for the truth of their past.

But the truth is not always easy to face, as her father's explanation of why he left the family is revealed; a dark secret of 20 years past is exposed, changing Ali's view on life forever.

== Cast ==
- Mako Iwamatsu as Tan
- Tan Kheng Hua as Ali
- Zelda Rubinstein as Liz
- Bobby Tonelli as Ethan
- Dickson Tan as Jonah
- Asrani as Leo

== Critical reception ==
Russell Edwards of Variety felt the film "remains imprisoned by stiff performances and a continually lurching script". Leah Aw of Sinema described the film with "a melodrama at heart, with ample potential for exploring the complex human relationship that undergird any family story."

== Festival Honors ==
- Busan International Film Festival 2005 : Official Selection
- Prague Film-Asia Film Festival 2005 : Closing Film
- Bangladesh International Film Festival 2006
