= Graham Streeter =

American film director

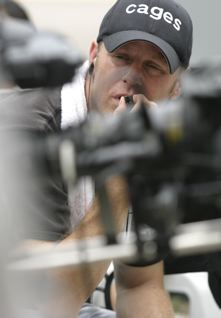
Graham Streeter in Singapore on the set of Cages in 2004.

Graham Streeter (born January 22, 1964) is an American film director, screenwriter and cinematographer.

Streeter was raised in northern California until high school. He lived in Osaka, Japan for 10 years while working in film and television, then returned to the United States and attended California State University, Sacramento. Streeter earned a double degree in international business administration and Japanese, then worked for Nippon Television in Los Angeles as a television field producer founding Imperative Pictures in Hollywood.

Streeter began his career in filmmaking by making short films, such as Crickets & Potatoes, a look at the absurdity of holiday dinner gatherings, and Frank in Five, with Paul Winfield, Gedde Watanabe, and Zelda Rubinstein.

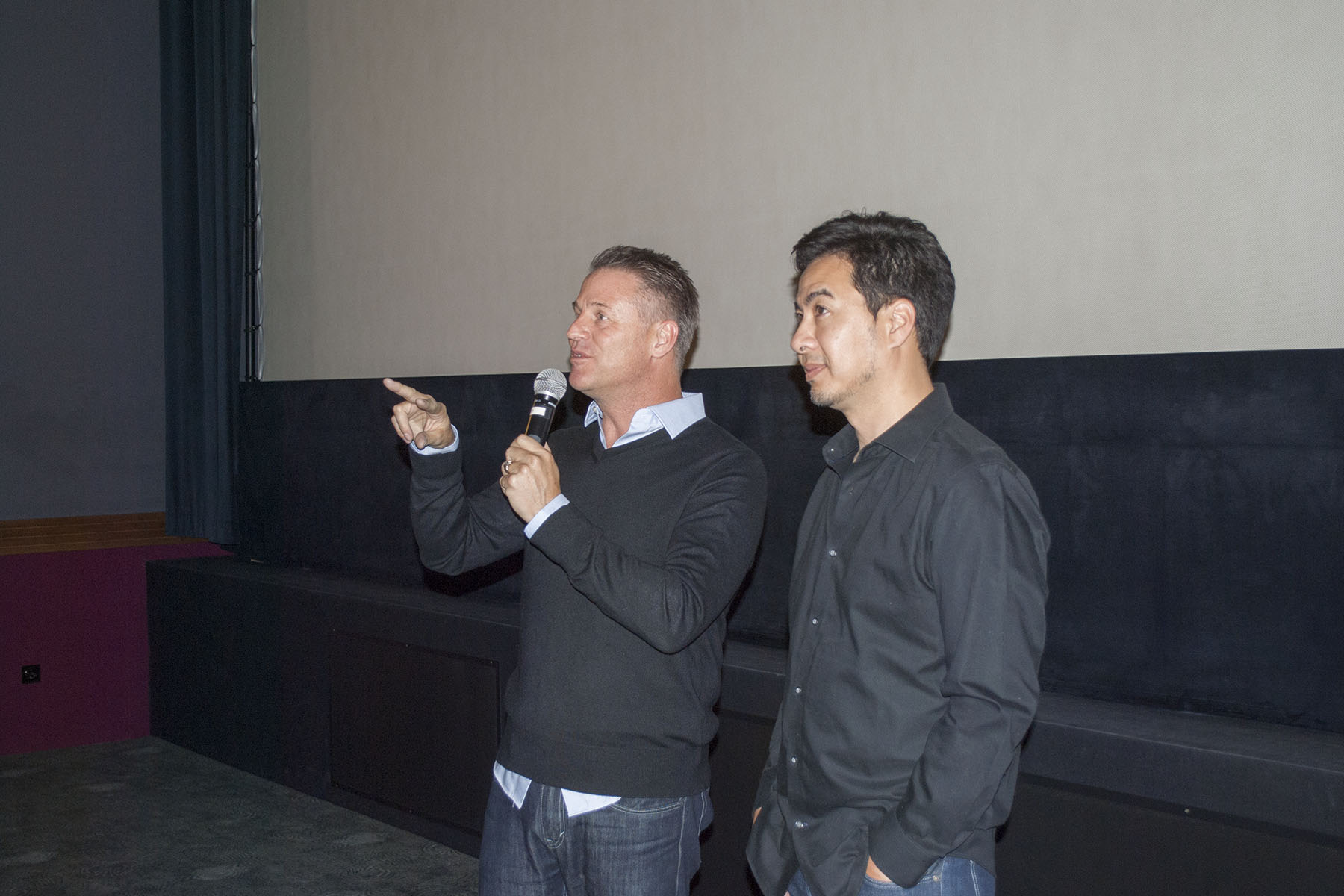
Graham Streeter at the Vienna Independent Film Festival in 2016

Streeter wrote, directed and also lensed the 2019 feature film I May Regret, starring Lisa Goodman and Denise Dorado, Imperfect Sky (2015), starring Blake Scott Lewis and Sam Lucas Smith, Blind Malice (2014) starring Grace Zabriskie, Tim Bagley, Grim Hans-Christian Bernhoft and Angelina Prendergast, produced by Imperative Pictures.

Streeter also wrote and directed the 2013 academically proclaimed documentary Boys in Peril, award-winning 2005 feature film Cages starring Mako Iwamatsu, Zelda Rubinstein and Bobby Tonelli. The film stayed in release in Asia for four weeks in 2007 and was the first Asian film to be purchased by the Hallmark Channel.

His 2018 film I May Regret was selected for the San Diego International Film Festival. The film won the Grand Prix at the Vienna Independent Film Festival.

At the 2023 edition of Vienna Independent Film Festival, Streeter received the Best Director award for the feature film Unfix.

== Awards ==
=== Unfix (2023) ===
- Winner Winner Best Feature Drama, Sacramento Int'l Film Festival 2023
- Winner Best Feature Film, Prague Independent Film Festival 2023
- Winner Best Director, Vienna Independent Film Festival 2023
- Winner Best Feature Film, FirstGlance Film Festival 2023
- Official Selection, Dances with Films. 2023

=== I May Regret (2019) ===
- Winner Grand Prix, Vienna Independent Film Festival
- Winner Best Director, Sydney Indie Film Festival 2019
- Winner Best Feature Film, Durango International Film Festival 2019
- Best Break-Out Film, San Diego International Film Festival 2019

=== Imperfect Sky (2015) ===
- Winner Best Pictures, Dublin Underground film Festival 2015
- Winner Best Feature Film Hollywood Independent Cinefest 2015
- Winner Best Drama, Best Male Actor, Best Supporting Male Actor, Sydney Indie Film Festival 2015

=== Blind Malice (2014) ===
- Winner Best Pictures, Sacramento International Film Festival 2014
- Best Thriller, Best Actress, Hollywood Reel Independent Film Festival 2014
- Winner Best Thriller, Hollywood reel indie Film Fest, Los Angeles 2013
