= Mako (actor) =

Japanese and American actor (1933–2006)

- 岩松 信
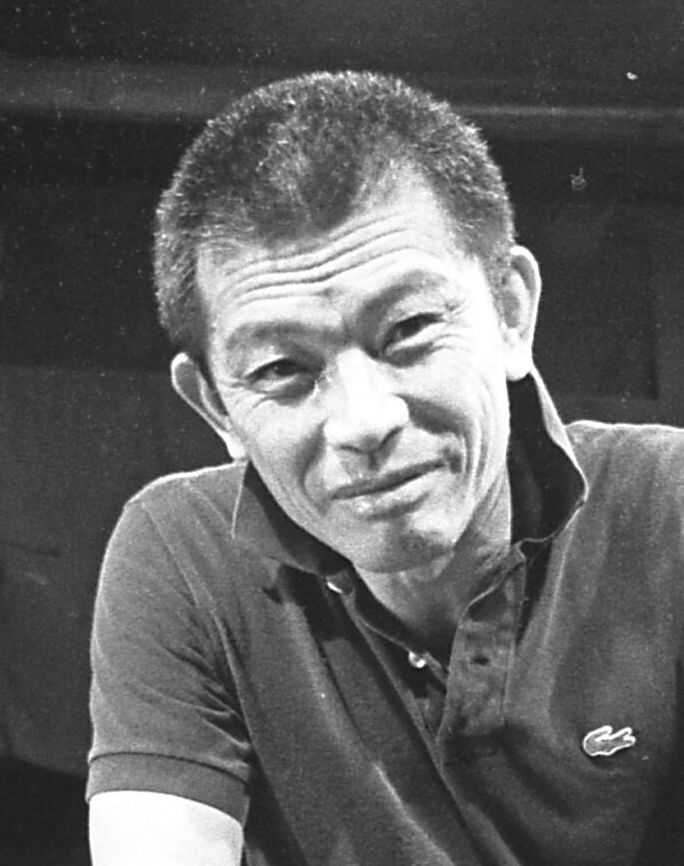
- Iwamatsu in 1986
- Born: Makoto Iwamatsu; December 10, 1933; Kobe, Hyōgo, Japan
- Died: July 21, 2006 (aged 72); Somis, California, U.S.
- Other name: Mako Iwamatsu
- Citizenship: Japan; United States (after 1956)
- Education: Pratt Institute School of Architecture; Pasadena Playhouse
- Occupation: Actor
- Years active: 1959–2006
- Spouse: Shizuko Hoshi
- Children: 2
- Parent(s): Taro Yashima (father); Mitsu Yashima (mother)

Japanese name
- Kanji: 岩松 信
- Hiragana: いわまつ まこと
- Katakana: イワマツ マコト
Transcriptions
- Romanization: Iwamatsu Makoto

Makoto Iwamatsu (岩松 信, Iwamatsu Makoto; December 10, 1933 – July 21, 2006) was a Japanese-American actor, credited mononymously in almost all of his acting roles as simply Mako (マコ; /ˈmɑːkoʊ/ MAH-koh). His career in film, on television, and on stage spanned five decades and 165 productions. He was nominated for an Academy Award, Golden Globe Award, and a Tony Award.

Born and raised in Kobe, Mako moved to the United States after the Second World War, where his dissident parents had moved to escape political persecution. After serving with the U.S. Army during the Korean War, he trained in acting at the Pasadena Playhouse and later co-founded the East West Players. His role as Po-Han (his second credited role on film) in the 1966 film The Sand Pebbles saw him nominated for the Academy Award and the Golden Globe Award for Best Supporting Actor.

His other various roles included Kichijiro in the 1971 film adaptation of Silence, Oomiak "The Fearless One" in The Island at the Top of the World (1974), Akiro the Wizard in Conan the Barbarian (1982) and Conan the Destroyer (1984), and Kungo Tsarong in Seven Years in Tibet (1997). He was part of the original cast of Stephen Sondheim's 1976 Broadway musical Pacific Overtures, which earned him a Tony Award nomination for Best Actor in a Musical. Later in his career, he became well known for his voice-acting roles, including Mr. Yamaguchi in Rugrats in Paris: The Movie, Aku in the first four seasons of Samurai Jack (2001–04), and Iroh in the first two seasons of Avatar: The Last Airbender (2005–06).

He died on July 21, 2006, at the age of 72 from esophageal cancer.

== Early life and education ==
Mako was born Makoto Iwamatsu in the Higashinada-ku ward of Kobe, the son of children's authors and illustrators Tomoe Sasako and Atsushi Iwamatsu, better known by their pen names Mitsu and Taro Yashima. In 1939, his parents, who were political dissidents, moved to the United States, leaving Mako in the care of his grandmother. Because his parents lived on the East Coast, they were not interned during World War II; instead they opted to work for the U.S. Office of War Information and were later granted residency. They arranged for him to join them in 1949, when he was fifteen years old.

Iwamatsu's father owned an art studio in New York City, and as a teenager, he became acquainted with painter Hiroshi Honda. Though he faced racial discrimination, Iwamatsu bonded with his high-school peers over baseball, and was even scouted by the Cleveland Indians.

Though he had an interest in dramatics, Iwamatsu did not believe an artistic career was financially viable, and enrolled in the Pratt Institute School of Architecture while working in his father's print shop. He later enlisted in the U.S. Army in November 1953 and served until October 1955, during which he performed in plays for his fellow soldiers. He then trained at the Pasadena Playhouse and adopted the mononym Mako, as he found most people had difficulty pronouncing his full name.

Iwamatsu became a naturalized U.S. citizen in 1956.

== Career ==
=== Film ===
Mako's first film role was in Never So Few (1959). He was nominated for an Academy Award for Best Supporting Actor for his role as engine-room worker Po-Han in the film The Sand Pebbles (1966). His other roles include the Chinese contract laborer Mun Ki in the epic movie The Hawaiians (1970) starring Charlton Heston and Tina Chen; Oomiak, the Inuk guide, in Disney's The Island at the Top of the World (1974); Yuen Chung in the film The Killer Elite (1975) directed by Sam Peckinpah and starring James Caan, Robert Duvall, and martial artist Takayuki Kubota; the sorcerer Nakano in Highlander III: The Sorcerer; Jackie Chan's uncle/sifu in Chan's first American movie The Big Brawl (1980); the wizard Akiro opposite Arnold Schwarzenegger in the two Conan movies Conan the Barbarian and Conan the Destroyer; the confidant to Chuck Norris' rogue cop in the thriller An Eye for an Eye (1982); and the Japanese spy in the comedy Under the Rainbow. In 1990, he had a minor role in the psychological thriller Pacific Heights along with Matthew Modine, Melanie Griffith, and Michael Keaton; Yoshida-san in Rising Sun; Mr. Lee in Sidekicks; Kanemitsu in RoboCop 3 (1993); and Kungo Tsarong in Seven Years in Tibet (1997).

He also appeared in some Japanese television dramas and films, such as Masahiro Shinoda's Owls' Castle and Takashi Miike's The Bird People in China.

Mako was cast as the historic Admiral Isoroku Yamamoto in the epic drama Pearl Harbor (2001). He also had a role in Bulletproof Monk (2003). In 2005, Mako had a cameo role in Memoirs of a Geisha. Mako's last leading role was in the film Cages (2005), written and directed by Graham Streeter. He voiced Master Splinter in the film TMNT, released posthumously in 2007 as his final credited role.

=== Theater ===
In 1965, frustrated by the limited roles available to Asian-American actors, Mako and six others formed the East West Players theater company, first performing out of a church basement. During the company's 1981 season, to coincide with the Commission on Wartime Relocation and Internment of Civilians' hearings on redress, Mako exclusively produced plays about the Japanese-American incarceration. He remained artistic director of the company until 1989.

Mako's Broadway career included creating the roles of the Reciter, the shogun, and the Chicago-based inventor of the rickshaw, in the original 1976 production of Stephen Sondheim's Broadway musical Pacific Overtures, for which he was nominated for a Tony Award for Best Leading Actor in a Musical. Mako's landlord at the time, Jerry Orbach, was also nominated for his role in Chicago; both lost, however, to George Rose from the revival of My Fair Lady. Mako recalled being awoken at 4:30 in the morning after the Tony ceremony by Orbach, who was shouting from the floor below: "Hey, Mako! What the fuck happened? I can't believe it; we lost to a fucking revival!". Mako reprised the role and directed the musical's production with the East West Players, and further reprised the role in a production at the San Jose Civic Light Opera in 1991. He also starred in the limited run of the play Shimada in 1992.

=== Television ===
Mako appeared on the television series McHale's Navy nine times between 1962 and 1965 playing Imperial Japanese officers, soldiers, and sailors. In 1965, he appeared on Gidget as a member of a rival surf group. He appeared as Low Sing, challenging Bruce Lee's character Kato in The Green Hornet episode "The Preying Mantis" (1966). Mako's biggest television role to date came in 1967 in The Time Tunnel, playing a sadistic soldier during the last months of World War II. That same year, Mako also appeared in an episode of the satirical comedy show F Troop.

Mako in appeared in "The Tide," a 1973 episode of Kung Fu as Wong Ti Lu. In 1974, he appeared in the Ironside episode "Terror on Grant Avenue". He appeared as a Japanese chef in the Columbo episode "Murder Under Glass" (1978). He was the blind philosopher Li Sung in two episodes of The Incredible Hulk (1978–79). From 1974 to 1980 he appeared on the television series M*A*S*H, playing multiple roles such as a Chinese doctor, a North Korean soldier, a South Korean medical doctor, and a South Korean lieutenant. He was featured in a season three episode of The Facts of Life, entitled "The Americanization of Miko" (1982). He also appeared on an episode of Magnum, P.I. entitled "The Arrow That Is Not Aimed" (1983). That same year he played the character Lin Duk Coo in an episode of The A-Team. He guest-starred in a 1987 episode of Tour of Duty as a Vietnamese scout. Mako guest starred opposite James Hong, Russell Wong and Elizabeth Sung on the popular action series The Equalizer as the ruthless gangster Jimmy Thanarat in the 1988 episode, "Riding the Elephant".

He guest-starred in the Walker, Texas Ranger episodes "Heart of the Dragon" (1997) and "Black Dragons" (2000), and in the Nickelodeon film Rugrats in Paris: The Movie (2000) as Coco's boss. He appeared on Charmed in 2003, creating magic for Chris (played by Drew Fuller). He guest-starred in the 2005 The West Wing episode "A Good Day" as an economics professor and former rival of President Bartlet. That same year, he was a guest star in the Monk episode "Mr. Monk vs. The Cobra".

=== Voice acting ===
Iwamatsu was the voice of Aku, the main antagonist in the animated series Samurai Jack for the first four seasons produced from 2001 to 2004, and again in the series finale, which used his original audio. He also voiced Achoo (a parody of Aku) and the annoying alarm clock Happy Cat in a Samurai Jack-parodying episode of Duck Dodgers entitled "Samurai Quack". He provided the introductory voice for the ending theme of Dexter's Laboratory and voiced Iroh in the first two seasons of Avatar: The Last Airbender from 2005 to 2006.

==== Video games ====
Mako made his video-game debut with the role of the goblin Grubjub in Lionheart: Legacy of the Crusader (2003). In the same year, he also voiced General Han Yu Kim in True Crime: Streets of LA, Masataka Shima in Medal of Honor: Rising Sun, and various voices in Secret Weapons Over Normandy. In 2004, Mako voiced the narrator in the game Wrath Unleashed, and Aku in Samurai Jack: The Shadow of Aku.

=== Literature ===
Mako wrote one book that was published in 1984, Amerika O Ikiru (アメリカを生きる). (ISBN 978-4-931049-18-5)

== Honors ==
Mako received a star on the Hollywood Walk of Fame for his contributions to motion picture, on January 2, 1994, at 7095 Hollywood Blvd.

== Personal life ==
Mako was married to actress Shizuko Hoshi, with whom he had two daughters (both of whom are actresses) and three grandchildren.

=== Death ===
Iwamatsu died in Somis, California, on July 21, 2006, aged 72, from esophageal cancer. Prior to his death, he had completed voice work for TMNT as the voice of Splinter, with the film being dedicated to him.

The Avatar: The Last Airbender season-two episode "The Tales of Ba Sing Se" is dedicated to Mako. In the sequel series The Legend of Korra, main cast member Mako (voiced by David Faustino) is named after him.

After Iwamatsu's death, Greg Baldwin replaced him as Aku in Samurai Jack and Iroh in Avatar: The Last Airbender and The Legend of Korra.

== Filmography ==
=== Film ===
Mako film credits
Year	Title	Role	Notes
1959	Never So Few	Soldier in Hospital	Uncredited
1965	McHale's Navy Joins the Air Force	Japanese Submarine Captain	Uncredited
1966	The Ugly Dachshund	Kenji	
1966	The Sand Pebbles	Po-Han	
1968	The Private Navy of Sgt. O'Farrell	Calvin Coolidge Ishimura	
1969	The Great Bank Robbery	Secret Agent Fong	
1970	The Hawaiians	Mun Ki	
1970	Fools	Psychiatrist	
1971	Silence	Kichijiro	
1972	Yokohama Mama	Rooster (voice)	Short
1974	The Island at the Top of the World	Oomiak	
1975	Prisoners	Sergeant Nguyen	
1975	The Killer Elite	Yuen Chung	
1979	The Bushido Blade	Enjiro	
1980	The Big Brawl	Herbert	
1980	Hito Hata: Raise the Banner	Oda	
1981	Under the Rainbow	Nakomuri	
1981	An Eye for an Eye	James Chan	
1982	Conan the Barbarian	Akiro The Wizard	
1983	Testament	Mike	
1983	The Last Ninja	Aitaro Sakura	
1984	Conan the Destroyer	Akiro The Wizard	
1986	Behind Enemy Lines	Captain Vinh	
1986	Armed Response	Akira Tanaka	
1988	Silent Assassins	Oyama	
1988	Tucker: The Man and His Dream	Jimmy	
1988	The Wash	Nobu Matsumoto	
1989	An Unremarkable Life	Max Chin	
1990	Pu guang ren wu	Trang	
1990	Taking Care of Business	Mr. Sakamoto	
1990	Pacific Heights	Toshio Watanabe	
1991	The Perfect Weapon	Kim	
1991	Strawberry Road	Frank Machida	
1992	My Samurai	Mr. Tszing	
1992	Sidekicks	Mr. Lee	
1993	RoboCop 3	Mr. Kanemitsu	
1993	Rising Sun	Mr. Yoshida	
1994	Cultivating Charlie	Katsu	
1994	Red Sun Rising	Buntoro Iga	
1994	A Dangerous Place	Sensei	
1994	Highlander III: The Sorcerer	Nakano	
1995	Midnight Man	Buun Som	
1995	Crying Freeman	Shudo Shimazaki	
1996	Balance of Power	Todo Matsumoto	
1996	Sworn to Justice	Mr. Young	
1997	Sacred Trust	Mr. Jordan	
1997	Seven Years in Tibet	Kungo Tsarong	
1998	The Bird People in China	Shen	
1999	Alegría	Adult Momo	
1999	Kyohansha	Police	
1999	Owls' Castle	Toyotomi Hideyoshi	
2000	Talk to Taka	Mr. Hiro	Short
2000	Rugrats in Paris: The Movie	Mr. Yamaguchi (voice)	
2001	Pearl Harbor	Admiral Isoroku Yamamoto	
2002	Cruel Game	Straw Hat	
2003	Bulletproof Monk	Mr. Kojima	
2003	Bus Story	Father Christmas	Short
2005	Cages	Tan	
2005	Memoirs of a Geisha	Sakamoto	
2007	TMNT	Master Splinter (voice)	Posthumous release; dedicated in memory
2007	Rise: Blood Hunter	Poe	Posthumous release

=== Television ===
Mako television credits
Year	Title	Role	Notes
1962	The Lloyd Bridges Show	Takahashi	Episode: "Yankee Stay Here"
1962–63	Ensign O'Toole	Various roles	3 episodes
1962–65	McHale's Navy	Various roles	9 episodes
1963	The Gallant Men	Frank Fakuda	Episode: "One Puka Puka"
1963	77 Sunset Strip	Iko Nakayama	Episode: "Stranger from the Sea"
1964	Arrest and Trial	Kyoto	Episode: "Signals of an Ancient Flame"
1964–65	Broadside	Japanese Commander / Captain Osato	2 episodes
1964–65	Burke's Law	Pete / 'Happy' Tuava	2 episodes
1965	I Dream of Jeannie	Kato	Episode: "Jeannie and the Marriage Caper"
1965	Gidget	Casey	Episode: "The War Between Men, Women and Gidget"
1965	The Wackiest Ship in the Army	T. Vushikori / Captain Kulijame	2 episodes
1965–66	I Spy	Jimmy / Baby Face	3 episodes
1966	The Green Hornet	Low Sing	Episode: "The Praying Mantis"
1966–68	The F.B.I.	Angry Youth / Yoshimura	2 episodes
1967	The Time Tunnel	Lieutenant Nakamura	Episode: "Kill Two by Two"
1967	F Troop	Samurai Warrior	Episode: "From Karate with Love"
1967	Vacation Playhouse	Simba	Episode: "Alfred of the Amazon"
1968	The Big Valley	Wong Lo	Episode: "Rimfire"
1970	The Challenge	Yuro	ABC Movie of the Week
1971	If Tomorrow Comes	Tadashi	ABC Movie of the Week
1972	The Streets of San Francisco	Kenji	Episode: "Pilot"
1972	Room 222	Mr. Shigematsu	Episode: "Just Call Me Mr. Shigematsu"
1972	Anna and the King	Sanum	Episode: "The King and the Egg"
1973	Kung Fu	Wong Ti Lu	Episode: "The Tide"
1973	Love, American Style	Jack	Episode: "Love and the Fortunate Cookie"
1974–80	M*A*S*H	Various roles	4 episodes
1974	Ironside	Phil	Episode: "Terror on Grant Avenue"
1974	Mannix	Tami Okada	Episode: "Enter Tami Okada"
1974	Judge Dee and the Monastery Murders	Tao Gan	Television film
1976	Hawaii Five-O	Kazuo Tahashi	Episode: "Legacy of Terror"
1976	Farewell to Manzanar	Fukimoto	Television film
1976	Visions	Masu Murakami	Episode: "Gold Watch"
1977–82	Quincy, M.E.	Mr. Yamaguchi / John Moroshima	Episode: "Touch of Death"
1978	Columbo	Kanji Ousu	Episode: "Murder Under Glass"
1978–79	The Incredible Hulk	Li Sung	2 episodes
1979	Supertrain	Kirby	Episode: "Pirouette"
1979	Wonder Woman	Mr. Brown	Episode: "Going, Going, Gone"
1979	Salvage 1	Toshiro	Episode: "Shangri-la Lil"
1979	When Hell Was in Session	Major Bai	Television film
1979	A Man Called Sloane	Tanaka	Episode: "Samurai"
1981	Fantasy Island	Kwong Soo Luke	Episode: "The Heroine; The Warrior"
1982	Voyagers!	Slave Auctioneer	Episode: "The Travels Of Marco...And Friends"
1982	Bring 'Em Back Alive	Tanako	Episode: "The Pied Piper"
1982	The Facts of Life	Mr. Wakamatsu	Episode: "The Americanization of Miko"
1982	Romance Theatre	Shibata	5 episodes
1983	The Last Ninja	Mantaro Sakura	Failed pilot
1983	The A-Team	Lin Duk Coo	Episode: "Recipe for Heavy Bread"
1983	Magnum, P.I.	Tozan	Episode: "The Arrow That Is Not Aimed"
1983	Greatest American Hero	Master of Flowers	Episode: "Thirty Seconds Over Little Tokyo"
1983	Faerie Tale Theatre	Gardener / Minister	Episode: "The Nightingale"
1983	Girls of the White Orchid	Mori	Television film
1984	Hawaiian Heat	Major Taro Oshira	11 episodes
1986	Kung Fu: The Movie	The Manchu	Television film
1987	Ohara	Toshi	Episode: "Toshi"
1987	Spenser: For Hire	Tommy Nguyen	Episode: "My Brother's Keeper"
1987	Tour of Duty	Tran	Episode: "Sitting Ducks"
1988	The Equalizer	Jimmy Thanarat	Episode: "Riding the Elephant"
1990	Murder in Paradise	Captain Kilalo	Television film
1990	Paradise	Kao	Episode: "Dangerous Cargo"
1990	The Paradise Club	Mr. Yamamoto	Episode: "The Rotherhithe Project"
1990	Hiroshima: Out of the Ashes	Sergeant Moritaki	Television film
1991	Lovejoy	Toshiro Tanaka	2 episodes
1992	Nightingale	Narrator (voice)	Television film
1993	Shaky Ground	Nakamura	Episode: "Stayin' Alive"
1994	Frasier	Sam Tanaka	Episode: "Author, Author"
1994–96	Kung Fu: The Legend Continues	Li Sung	2 episodes
1995	Platypus Man	Mr. Loo	Episode: "Dying to Live"
1996–2003	Dexter's Laboratory	Narrator (voice)	13 episodes
1997–2000	Walker, Texas Ranger	Dr. Henry Lee / Edward Song	2 episodes
1997	Riot	Mr. Lee	Television film; segment: "Gold Mountain"
1998	JAG	Ichiro Higashimori	Episode: "Innocence"
1999	Martial Law	Master Reng	2 episodes
1999	7th Heaven	Henry Muranaka	Episode: "Dirty Laundry"
2000	The Secret Adventures of Jules Verne	Kajimori	Episode: "The Inquisitor"
2001	Diagnosis Murder	Lee Moy	Episode: "The Red's Shoes"
2001–04, 2017	Samurai Jack	Aku, Hermit (voices)	25 episodes
2003	Lost at Home	Mr. Li	Episode: "Good Will Hunting"
2003	Black Sash	Master Li	6 episodes
2003	What's New, Scooby-Doo?	The Ancient One (voice)	Episode: "Big Appetite in Little Tokyo"
2003	Charmed	Sorcerer	Episode: "Love's a Witch"
2003–05	Duck Dodgers	Happy Cat, Achoo (voices)	4 episodes
2004	The Grim Adventures of Billy & Mandy	Narrator (voice)	Episode: "A Kick in the Asgard"
2005	Monk	Master Zi	Episode: "Mr. Monk vs. the Cobra"
2005	The West Wing	Yosh Takahashi	Episode: "A Good Day"
2005	Super Robot Monkey Team Hyperforce Go!	Master Offay (voice)	Episode: "Monster Battle Club Now!"
2005	Sokoku	Leo	Television film
2005–06	Avatar: The Last Airbender	Uncle Iroh (voice)	30 episodes

=== Video games ===
Year	Title	Voice role	Notes
2003	Lionheart: Legacy of the Crusader	Grumdjum	
2003	True Crime: Streets of LA	General Han Yu Kim	
2003	Medal of Honor: Rising Sun	Commander Masataka Shima	
2003	Secret Weapons Over Normandy	Imperial Japanese Voices #1	
2004	Samurai Jack: The Shadow of Aku	Aku	
2004	Wrath Unleashed	Narrator	
2020	Samurai Jack: Battle Through Time	Aku	Archival audio

== Awards and nominations ==
Award	Year	Category	Work	Result	Ref.
Academy Award	1967	Best Supporting Actor	The Sand Pebbles	Nominated	
Golden Globe Award	1967	Best Supporting Actor — Motion Picture	The Sand Pebbles	Nominated	
Tony Award	1976	Best Actor in a Musical	Pacific Overtures	Nominated	
