= Bobby Tonelli =

American entertainer (born 1975)

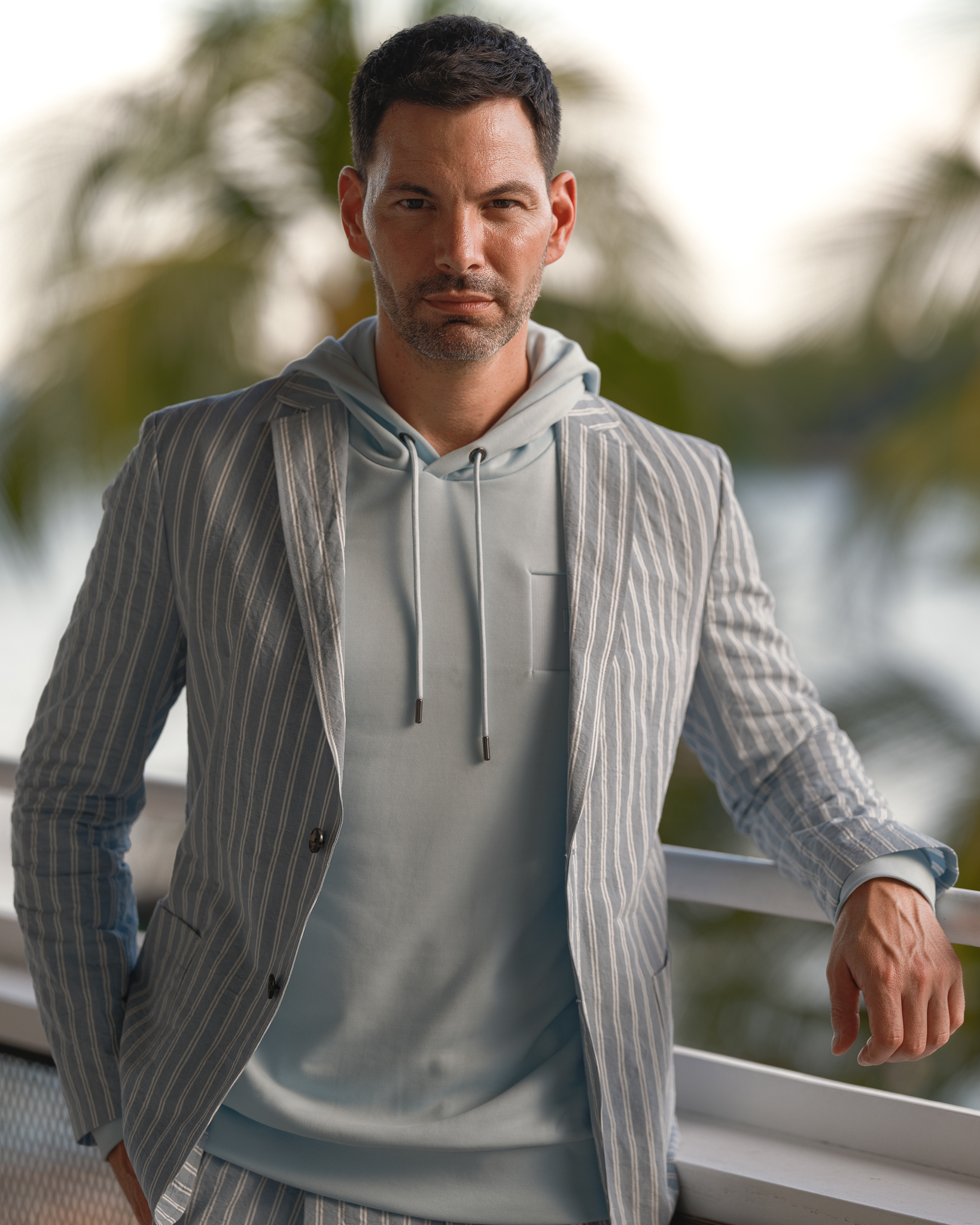
- Tonelli in 2021
- Born: Robert Tonelli Jr. October 25, 1975 (age 50); Las Vegas, Nevada, U.S.
- Education: Chaparral High School
- Occupations: Actor; host; model; baseball pitcher; radio DJ; businessman
- Years active: 1990s–present

Robert Tonelli Jr. (born October 25, 1975), known professionally as Bobby Tonelli, is an American actor and television host who has appeared in several Hollywood films including Cages, Running Red, No Tomorrow, and The Darwin Conspiracy, as well as numerous Singapore television series.

== Early life ==
Bobby Tonelli was born and raised in Las Vegas, Nevada. He attended Chaparral High School there and graduated in 1994. He had a promising career in baseball as a pitcher until he suffered a rotator cuff injury that hindered his chances to pitch at the professional level. Tonelli attended several small colleges in California in hopes of rehabilitating his shoulder and professional baseball pitching career. After leaving baseball in 1997, he fell into the fashion industry by chance and traveled throughout Southeast Asia as a print and runway model, working for companies such as Donna Karan, Versace, Levi's, and Louis Vuitton.

In 1998, Tonelli traveled to Europe to continue modeling where he also attended The Actors Centre in London. He also studied with several renowned acting coaches in the US, including Ivana Chubbuck, Howard Fine, and John Holma.

== Career ==
=== Television ===
From 1999 to 2004, Tonelli's acting career consisted of smaller roles in television and feature films. In 2002, his involvement in the Singaporean feature film Cages began after a chance meeting with director Graham Streeter. Because of his previous art background as an accomplished painter, Tonelli chose to paint all of the character Ethan's art in that film. During this time he also starred in the experimental short Hallelujah also directed by Streeter.

==== 2007−2010 ====
In 2007, Tonelli returned to Singapore where he was seen in the MediaCorp English programme Life Story featured as the American coach of Ang Peng Siong. He was one of six contestants in the Art Central reality programme The Food Bachelor. Tonelli has been one of the few prominent foreign actors in Singapore working on projects in various languages and channels. The turning point in his career was a supporting role in the Channel 8 drama The Little Nyonya playing the part of Paul Robertson, a lawyer who helps and eventually marries Yueniang, played by the actress Jeanette Aw. The series garnered the highest ratings for Channel 8 in 14 years. Tonelli was part of the ensemble cast of the original musical Sleepless Town in 2009. In 2010 the actor was one of the stars of the Channel 5 drama series Fighting Spiders for two seasons. He also guest-starred in two seasons of Channel 5's series The Pupil and guest-starred in the comedy Anything Goes. Besides Channel 5, Tonelli has also acted in five Suria (Malay) productions: Fajar Ramadan, BFF, Atas Heights Season 1, UMMI season 2, and Munah & Hirzi; Action which garnered him a nomination for "Best Villain" at the 2013 Pesta Perdana Awards show.

Tonelli also co-starred in Okto series 100 Wishes for two seasons, starred in the Okto tele-movie The Million Dollar Job 2: Raffles' Gold and guest-starred in Nick of Time. He continued working for Channel 8, appearing in the Mandarin drama series Double Bonus, playing the part of Michael, the ex-boyfriend of Peiling, played by actress Tracy Lee, and then followed by co-starring in the 30th anniversary blockbuster drama series Joys of Life acting opposite Rui En. Both dramas required the actor to speak Mandarin quite extensively.

==== 2011−2017 ====
Tonelli was seen in Diva's Hot Guys Who Cook as well as Channel 5's Sasuke Singapore. In 2012, he starred in the mini-series Keong Saik Street.

Tonelli also starred in the Toggle comedy series King of the Keng, guest-starred in "Door to Door", hosted the sports reality show Take Me On and co-starred in the xinmsn series Get Social.

In 2014, Tonelli acted in two feature films: as the male lead opposite Kit Chan in Ms J Contemplates Her Choice and as Steven in Wayang Boy.

In 2015, Tonelli co-starred in The Circle House, a Channel 5 telemovie which aired in late February, Suria series Interns as Runway Rio, Kosmopolitan as James, Channel U series Love? alongside Felicia Chin, and Channel 5 series Zero Calling Season 2 and guest-starred on Suria's drama 93m2. Also in 2015 Tonelli was cast as Captain Jason Anderson in what was touted as China's first English-language science fiction film Lost in the Pacific, released in China cinemas in December 2015.

==== Foray into cable television ====
In 2016, Tonelli had a guest-starring role in the Channel 5 series Rojak, and reprised his role as "RunWay Rio" on Suria's Interns Season 2. In a departure from Singapore television series, Tonelli hosted his first regional television show Celebrity Car Wars on The History Channel Asia. With the success of the first season of Celebrity Car Wars, season 2 has been scheduled to go into production in mid-2017.

In 2017, Tonelli was the co-host of Channel 5 Steady lah!, Celebrity Car Wars season 2 and appeared in a deleted scene of Crazy Rich Asians. In 2020, Tonelli also appeared in Westworld Season 3, and co-hosted and hosted the Asian Academy Creative Awards for 2020 and 2021. Also in 2021 he co-hosted the official launch of Disney+ in Singapore with Nikki Muller.

In Singapore television Tonelli has acted in 7 Mandarin drama series, 11 Malaysian drama series, 11 English drama series, hosted 8 English television/online shows and appeared in various variety and game shows in both English and Mandarin.

Tonelli speaks and acts in fluent English, basic Mandarin, and is learning Indonesian.

=== Radio ===
Apart from his acting career Tonelli has also been a radio DJ for Mediacorp Radio for the past four years. He co-hosted Class 95 Cartunes with Jean Danker from 2010 to 2012, Rude Awakening on 987FM with Rosalyn Lee (Rozz) 2012–2014, and finally returned to Class 95 as the host of Class 95 Nights with Bobby Tonelli.

In early 2015, after four years on radio, Tonelli left to focus on personal business ventures, acting in television and film, and emcee work.

=== 2018−present ===
He is the host of Celebrity Car Wars, an hour-long action reality series, consisting of 8 week road of automotive discovery.
