= Hands-On Mobile =

Wireless entertainment company

- Formerly: Mforma (2000–2006)
- Type: Subsidiary
- Industry: Entertainment
- Founded: 2000; 26 years ago
- Founder: Eric Bilange (co-founder), David Bluhm (co-founder), Dan Kranzler (main investor), Christophe Watkins (co-founder)
- Headquarters: San Francisco
- Number of employees: 50 (2002)

Hands-On Mobile, formerly known as Mforma, is a wireless entertainment company established in 2000. The company develops, publishes and distributes mobile content via network operators and portals. It offers its content in or via Java ME, BREW, SMS, MMS, and WAP in English, French, Italian, Spanish, German, Portuguese, Czech, Chinese and Korean.

Hands-On Mobile is a private company headquartered in San Francisco, California. It has offices in San Diego, London and Manchester (UK), Madrid (Spain), Paris (France), Munich (Germany), Beijing and Shanghai (China), and São Paulo (Brazil).

Investors include eFund International, Draper Fisher Jurvetson, General Catalyst Partners, Institutional Venture Partners and Bessemer Venture Partners.

== History ==
Mforma was founded in 2000. The company changed its name to Hands-On Mobile in April 2006.

=== Notable customers ===
- AT&T
