= My Paper =

Newspaper in Singapore

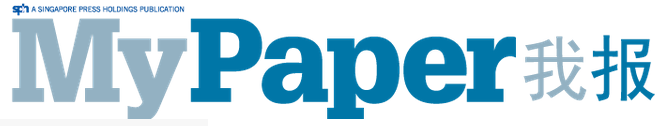
- Native name: 我报
- Type: Free daily newspaper
- Format: Compact / Tabloid
- Owner: Singapore Press Holdings
- Editor: English: Yeow Kai Chai; Chinese: Goh Sin Teck
- Founded: 1 June 2006; 20 years ago (in Chinese); 8 January 2008; 18 years ago (bilingual)
- Ceased publication: 1 December 2016; 9 years ago
- Language: Bilingual (English, Chinese)
- Headquarters: Singapore
- Circulation: 300,000
- Price: Free
- Website: mypaper.sg

My Paper (Chinese: 我报; pinyin: Wǒ Bào) was a free, bilingual (English and Chinese) newspaper in Singapore published by the Singapore Press Holdings.

It was published from Mondays to Fridays, excluding public holidays; and an electronic copy of the print edition is published on the paper's website. The newspaper has a daily circulation of 300,000 copies, and is distributed in the morning at MRT stations, bus interchanges, office buildings and selected residential areas in Singapore.

My Paper was a compact-sized, full-colour newspaper, that featured two "front" pages. It was divided equally into both English-language and Chinese-language sections with the pages of the English-language side of the paper reading from left to right (as would an English-language book); while the pages of the Chinese-language on the opposite side of the paper reads from right to left (as would a Chinese-language book). Instead of a mirror translation of articles, each piece of news or commentary in My Paper was presented in one language only.

== History ==
My Paper was first published on 1 June 2006 and was the first free Chinese-language newspaper in Singapore. It started with a daily circulation of 100,000 copies and was initially published from Tuesdays to Saturdays. On 8 January 2008, My Paper was relaunched as the first full-fledged bilingual newspaper in Singapore.

On 17 October 2016, Singapore Press Holdings announced a cut of 10% of staff and that My Paper and The New Paper (TNP) would merge to form a revamped TNP that would be distributed free from 1 December 2016.

== See also ==
- List of newspapers in Singapore
