= Lists of American television episodes =

This is a list of lists of American television episodes.

== General ==
- Lists of American children's animated television episodes
- Lists of American children's television episodes
- Lists of American comedy television episodes
- Lists of American crime television episodes
- Lists of American drama television episodes
- Lists of American non-fiction television episodes
- Lists of American sitcom episodes

== Action ==
- List of The A-Team episodes
- List of Agents of S.H.I.E.L.D. episodes
- List of Airwolf episodes
- List of Alias episodes
- List of Arrow episodes
- List of Bat Masterson episodes
- List of Batman (TV series) episodes
- List of Batwoman episodes
- List of Baywatch episodes
- List of Baywatch Nights episodes
- List of Beastmaster episodes
- List of The Bionic Woman episodes
- List of Bonanza episodes
- List of The Boys episodes
- List of Buffy the Vampire Slayer episodes
- List of Charlie's Angels episodes
- List of CHiPs episodes
- List of Chosen episodes
- List of The Equalizer (1985 TV series) episodes
- List of The Fall Guy episodes
- List of The Flash episodes
- List of Flipper episodes
- List of Gotham episodes
- List of Hart to Hart episodes
- List of iZombie episodes
- List of Kamen Rider: Dragon Knight episodes
- List of Knight Rider (1982 TV series) episodes
- List of Kung Fu episodes
- List of Kung Fu: The Legend Continues episodes
- List of Lawman episodes
- List of Legends of Tomorrow episodes
- List of MacGyver (1985 TV series) episodes
- List of MacGyver (2016 TV series) episodes
- List of Magnum, P.I. episodes
- List of The Man from U.N.C.L.E. episodes
- List of McMillan & Wife episodes
- List of Moonlighting episodes
- List of NCIS episodes
- List of NCIS: Hawaiʻi episodes
- List of NCIS: Los Angeles episodes
- List of NCIS: New Orleans episodes
- List of NCIS: Origins episodes
- List of Nikita episodes
- List of The Pretender episodes
- List of The Rat Patrol episodes
- List of Renegade episodes
- List of S.W.A.T. (1975 TV series) episodes
- List of S.W.A.T. (2017 TV series) episodes
- List of Scarecrow and Mrs. King episodes
- List of Simon & Simon episodes
- List of The Six Million Dollar Man episodes
- List of Starsky & Hutch episodes
- List of State Trooper episodes
- List of Supergirl episodes
- List of Supernatural episodes
- List of The Unit episodes
- List of Walker, Texas Ranger episodes
- List of Wanted Dead or Alive episodes
- List of Wonder Woman episodes
- List of The Young Indiana Jones Chronicles episodes

== Adult animation ==
- List of 12 oz. Mouse episodes
- List of Æon Flux episodes
- List of American Dad! episodes
- List of Animals episodes
- List of Aqua Teen Hunger Force episodes
- List of Archer episodes
- List of Beavis and Butt-Head episodes
- List of Big Mouth episodes
- List of Bob's Burgers episodes
- List of BoJack Horseman episodes
- List of The Boondocks episodes
- List of Bravest Warriors episodes
- List of Brickleberry episodes
- List of Cake (2019 TV series) episodes
- List of Celebrity Deathmatch episodes
- List of China, IL episodes
- List of The Cleveland Show episodes
- List of Creature Comforts episodes
- List of The Critic episodes
- List of Daria episodes
- List of Dick Figures episodes
- List of Disenchantment episodes
- List of Drawn Together episodes
- List of Duckman episodes
- List of F Is for Family episodes
- List of Family Guy episodes
- List of Final Space episodes
- List of Futurama episodes
- List of The Great North episodes
- List of Happy Tree Friends episodes
- List of Harley Quinn episodes
- List of Harvey Birdman, Attorney at Law episodes
- List of Helluva Boss episodes
- List of Home Movies episodes
- List of King of the Hill episodes
- List of Krapopolis episodes
- List of The Legend of Vox Machina episodes
- List of Love, Death & Robots episodes
- List of Metalocalypse episodes
- List of Mike Tyson Mysteries episodes
- List of Moral Orel episodes
- List of The Most Popular Girls in School episodes
- List of Mr. Pickles episodes
- List of Off the Air episodes
- List of Our Cartoon President episodes
- List of The PJs episodes
- List of Rick and Morty episodes
- List of Robot Chicken episodes
- List of Royal Crackers episodes
- List of RWBY episodes
- List of Samurai Jack episodes
- List of Sealab 2021 episodes
- List of The Simpsons episodes
- List of The Simpsons episodes (season 21–present)
- List of The Simpsons episodes (seasons 1–20)
- List of Solar Opposites episodes
- List of South Park episodes
- List of Space Ghost Coast to Coast episodes
- List of Squidbillies episodes
- List of Superjail! episodes
- List of SuperMansion episodes
- List of Tuca & Bertie episodes
- List of Ugly Americans episodes
- List of The Venture Bros. episodes
- List of Wait Till Your Father Gets Home episodes
- List of Young Justice episodes

== Espionage ==
- List of 12 oz. Mouse episodes
- List of The Agency episodes
- List of Airwolf episodes
- List of Alias episodes
- List of The Americans episodes
- List of Burn Notice episodes
- List of Covert Affairs episodes
- List of La Femme Nikita episodes
- List of The Man from U.N.C.L.E. episodes
- List of Mission: Impossible (1966 TV series) episodes
- List of Nikita episodes
- List of Quantico episodes
- List of Scarecrow and Mrs. King episodes

== Fantasy ==
- List of Adventures of Superman episodes
- List of Angel episodes
- List of Arrow episodes
- List of Batman (TV series) episodes
- List of Beastmaster episodes
- List of Buffy the Vampire Slayer episodes
- List of Charmed episodes
- List of Charmed (2018 TV series) episodes
- List of Drop Dead Diva episodes
- List of Good Witch episodes
- List of The Greatest American Hero episodes
- List of Grimm episodes
- List of Heroes episodes
- List of House of Anubis episodes
- List of Kamen Rider: Dragon Knight episodes
- List of The Librarians episodes
- List of Lois & Clark: The New Adventures of Superman episodes
- List of The Lost World episodes
- List of Lucifer episodes
- List of The Magicians (American TV series) episodes
- List of Once Upon a Time episodes
- List of Reaper episodes
- List of Sabrina the Teenage Witch episodes
- List of Shadowhunters episodes
- List of Smallville episodes
- List of Supergirl episodes
- List of Supernatural episodes
- List of Swamp Thing (1990 TV series) episodes
- List of True Blood episodes
- List of The Vampire Diaries episodes
- List of VR Troopers episodes
- List of The Wild Wild West episodes
- List of Witches of East End episodes
- List of Wonder Woman episodes
- List of Wynonna Earp episodes

== Horror and supernatural ==
- List of Alfred Hitchcock Presents (1985 TV series) episodes
- List of American Horror Story episodes
- List of Angel episodes
- List of Bates Motel episodes
- List of Buffy the Vampire Slayer episodes
- List of Charmed episodes
- List of Chilling Adventures of Sabrina episodes
- List of Creepshow (TV series) episodes
- List of Dark Shadows episodes
- List of Fear the Walking Dead episodes
- List of Freddy's Nightmares episodes
- List of Ghost Whisperer episodes
- List of Haven episodes
- List of Hemlock Grove episodes
- List of The Lair episodes
- List of Legacies episodes
- List of Manifest episodes
- List of Nancy Drew (2019 TV series) episodes
- List of The Originals episodes
- List of Preacher episodes
- List of Salem episodes
- List of Sleepy Hollow episodes
- List of Stranger Things episodes
- List of Supernatural episodes
- List of Tales from the Crypt episodes
- List of Teen Wolf episodes
- List of True Blood episodes
- List of Twin Peaks episodes
- List of The Vampire Diaries episodes
- List of The X-Files episodes
- List of Z Nation episodes

== LGBTQ ==
- List of 1970s American television episodes with LGBTQ themes
- List of 1980s American television episodes with LGBTQ themes
- List of 1990s American television episodes with LGBTQ themes
- List of pre–Stonewall riots American television episodes with LGBTQ themes
- List of Ellen episodes
- List of Glee episodes
- List of In the Life episodes
- List of The L Word episodes
- List of Queer as Folk episodes
- List of Queer Eye episodes
- List of RuPaul's Drag Race episodes
- List of RuPaul's Drag Race All Stars episodes
- List of RuPaul's Drag U episodes
- List of Transparent episodes
- List of Will & Grace episodes

== Mystery ==
- List of Angie Tribeca episodes
- List of Bates Motel episodes
- List of Final Space episodes
- List of Lost episodes
- List of Medium episodes
- List of Nancy Drew (2019 TV series) episodes
- List of NCIS: Origins episodes
- List of Pretty Little Liars episodes
- List of Riverdale episodes

== Romance ==
- List of Ally McBeal episodes
- List of Beauty and the Beast (1987 TV series) episodes
- List of Crazy Ex-Girlfriend episodes
- List of Friends episodes
- List of How I Met Your Mother episodes
- List of The L Word episodes
- List of Melissa & Joey episodes
- List of New Girl episodes
- List of Rules of Engagement episodes
- List of Sex and the City episodes
- List of Soap episodes
- List of You're the Worst episodes
- List of Younger episodes

== Science fiction ==
- List of 12 Monkeys episodes
- List of The 100 episodes
- List of The 4400 episodes
- List of Aaron Stone episodes
- List of Agents of S.H.I.E.L.D. episodes
- List of Airwolf episodes
- List of ALF episodes
- List of Andromeda episodes
- List of Arrow episodes
- List of Babylon 5 episodes
- List of Battlestar Galactica (1978 TV series) and Galactica 1980 episodes
- List of Battlestar Galactica (2004 TV series) episodes
- List of Ben 10 (2005 TV series) episodes
- List of Big Bad Beetleborgs episodes
- List of The Bionic Woman episodes
- List of Black Lightning episodes
- List of The Boys episodes
- List of Buck Rogers in the 25th Century episodes
- List of Dark Angel episodes
- List of The Dead Zone episodes
- List of Defiance episodes
- List of Dollhouse episodes
- List of Eureka episodes
- List of Exosquad episodes
- List of The Expanse episodes
- List of Falling Skies episodes
- List of Farscape episodes
- List of Final Space episodes
- List of The Flash episodes
- List of Fringe episodes
- List of From episodes
- List of Futurama episodes
- List of Goosebumps episodes
- List of Haven episodes
- List of Heroes episodes
- List of Humans episodes
- List of The Incredible Hulk (1978 TV series) episodes
- List of Invader Zim episodes
- List of Jeremiah episodes
- List of The Jetsons episodes
- List of Johnny Test episodes
- List of Kyle XY episodes
- List of Land of the Giants episodes
- List of Land of the Lost episodes
- List of Legends of Tomorrow episodes
- List of Lilo & Stitch: The Series episodes
- List of Lois & Clark: The New Adventures of Superman episodes
- List of Lost episodes
- List of Lost in Space episodes
- List of Men in Black: The Series episodes
- List of Mutant X episodes
- List of My Secret Identity episodes
- List of Night Man episodes
- List of The Outer Limits (1963 TV series) episodes
- List of The Outer Limits (1995 TV series) episodes
- Lists of The Outer Limits episodes
- List of Quantum Leap (1989 TV series) episodes
- List of Revolution episodes
- List of Rick and Morty episodes
- List of Roswell episodes
- List of seaQuest DSV episodes
- List of The Secret World of Alex Mack episodes
- List of The Sentinel episodes
- List of Seven Days episodes
- List of She-Ra: Princess of Power episodes
- List of The Six Million Dollar Man episodes
- List of Sliders episodes
- List of Smallville episodes
- List of Solar Opposites episodes
- List of Star Trek: The Original Series episodes
- List of Star Trek: Deep Space Nine episodes
- List of Star Trek: Enterprise episodes
- List of Star Trek: Voyager episodes
- List of Star Trek: The Next Generation episodes
- List of Star Wars: The Clone Wars episodes
- List of Star Wars: Young Jedi Adventures episodes
- List of Stargate Atlantis episodes
- List of Stargate SG-1 episodes
- List of Stargate Universe episodes
- List of Stitchers episodes
- List of Supergirl episodes
- List of Swamp Thing (1990 TV series) episodes
- List of Teenage Mutant Ninja Turtles (2003 TV series) episodes
- List of Teenage Mutant Ninja Turtles (1987 TV series) episodes
- List of Teenage Mutant Ninja Turtles (2012 TV series) episodes
- List of TekWar episodes
- List of Terminator: The Sarah Connor Chronicles episodes
- List of The Troop episodes
- List of True Blood episodes
- List of The Twilight Zone episodes
- List of The Twilight Zone (1985 TV series) episodes
- Lists of The Twilight Zone episodes
- List of Under the Dome episodes
- List of V (2009 TV series) episodes
- List of Voltron episodes
- List of VR Troopers episodes
- List of Warehouse 13 episodes
- List of Weird Science episodes
- List of Westworld episodes
- List of The Wild Wild West episodes
- List of Wynonna Earp episodes
- List of The X-Files episodes

== Western ==
- List of The Adventures of Kit Carson episodes
- List of The Adventures of Rin-Tin-Tin episodes
- List of The Adventures of Wild Bill Hickok episodes
- List of Bat Masterson episodes
- List of The Big Valley episodes
- List of Bonanza episodes
- List of Cheyenne episodes
- List of The Cisco Kid episodes
- List of Daniel Boone episodes
- List of Deadwood episodes
- List of Death Valley Days episodes
- List of Dick Powell's Zane Grey Theatre episodes
- List of Dr. Quinn, Medicine Woman episodes
- List of F Troop episodes
- List of Fury episodes
- List of Gunsmoke (TV series) episodes
- List of Have Gun – Will Travel episodes
- List of Hell on Wheels episodes
- List of The High Chaparral episodes
- List of How the West Was Won episodes
- List of Justified episodes
- List of Kung Fu episodes
- List of Laramie episodes
- List of Lawman episodes
- List of The Life and Legend of Wyatt Earp episodes
- List of Little House on the Prairie episodes
- List of The Lone Ranger episodes
- List of Longmire episodes
- List of Maverick episodes
- List of Paradise episodes
- List of Rawhide episodes
- List of The Rifleman episodes
- List of The Roy Rogers Show episodes
- List of State Trooper episodes
- List of Tales of Wells Fargo episodes
- List of The Virginian episodes
- List of Wagon Train episodes
- List of Walker, Texas Ranger episodes
- List of Wanted Dead or Alive episodes
- List of Westworld episodes
- List of The Wild Wild West episodes
- List of Yellowstone episodes
- List of The Young Riders episodes
- List of Zorro (1957 TV series) episodes
- List of Zorro (1990 TV series) episodes
