= Watered Down =

Watered Down may refer to:

== Music ==
=== Albums ===
- Watered Down, a 1968 album by The Starlets, a girl group of which Minnie Riperton was a member

=== Songs ===
- "Watered Down", from the 2003 Paint It Black album CVA
- "Watered Down", from the 2009 The Used album Artwork
- "Watered Down", from the 2013 Swearin' album Surfing Strange
- "Watered Down", from the 2017 Trace Adkins album Something's Going On

== Television ==
- "Watered Down", a 1995 episode of VR Troopers
- "Watered Down", a 2003 episode of Kevin Spencer
