= List of Swamp Thing episodes =

List of Swamp Thing episodes may refer to:

- List of Swamp Thing (1990 TV series) episodes
- List of Swamp Thing (1991 TV series) episodes
- List of Swamp Thing (2019 TV series) episodes
