= Lists of American children's television episodes =

This is a list of lists of American children's television episodes.

== General ==
- List of The Adventures of Kit Carson episodes
- List of The Adventures of Rin-Tin-Tin episodes
- List of The Adventures of Wild Bill Hickok episodes
- List of Barney & Friends episodes
- List of Bear in the Big Blue House episodes
- List of Bill Nye the Science Guy episodes
- List of Daktari episodes
- List of Donkey Hodie episodes
- List of The Electric Company (2009 TV series) episodes
- List of Flipper episodes
- List of Fraggle Rock episodes
- List of Fury episodes
- List of Gabby's Dollhouse episodes
- List of Ghostwriter episodes
- List of Goosebumps episodes
- List of Honey, I Shrunk the Kids: The TV Show episodes
- List of Imagination Movers episodes
- List of Isa TKM episodes
- List of Just Add Magic episodes
- List of Kamen Rider: Dragon Knight episodes
- List of Kids Incorporated episodes
- List of Lassie (1954 TV series) episodes
- List of Masked Rider episodes
- List of Odd Squad episodes
- List of Oobi episodes
- List of Pee-wee's Playhouse episodes
- List of Reading Rainbow episodes
- List of Saved by the Bell episodes
- List of Saved by the Bell: The New Class episodes
- List of Signing Time! episodes
- List of Wishbone episodes

== Cartoon Network ==
- List of Adventure Time episodes
- List of The Amazing World of Gumball episodes
- List of Apple & Onion episodes
- List of Batman: The Brave and the Bold episodes
- List of Ben 10 (2005 TV series) episodes
- List of Ben 10 (2016 TV series) episodes
- List of Ben 10: Alien Force episodes
- List of Ben 10: Omniverse episodes
- List of Ben 10: Ultimate Alien episodes
- List of Bunnicula episodes
- List of Camp Lazlo episodes
- List of Chowder episodes
- List of Clarence episodes
- List of Codename: Kids Next Door episodes
- List of Courage the Cowardly Dog episodes
- List of Cow and Chicken episodes
- List of Craig of the Creek episodes
- List of DC Super Hero Girls (TV series) episodes
- List of Dexter's Laboratory episodes
- List of Duck Dodgers episodes
- List of Ed, Edd n Eddy episodes
- List of Foster's Home for Imaginary Friends episodes
- List of Generator Rex episodes
- List of The Grim Adventures of Billy & Mandy episodes
- List of I Am Weasel episodes
- List of Infinity Train episodes
- List of Johnny Bravo episodes
- List of La CQ episodes
- List of LazyTown episodes
- List of Baby Looney Tunes episodes
- List of Dorothy and the Wizard of Oz episodes
- List of Hi Hi Puffy AmiYumi episodes
- List of New Looney Tunes episodes
- List of Teen Titans episodes
- List of The Tom and Jerry Show (2014 TV series) episodes
- List of Wacky Races (2017 TV series) episodes
- List of The Marvelous Misadventures of Flapjack episodes
- List of Mighty Magiswords episodes
- List of My Gym Partner's a Monkey episodes
- List of The Powerpuff Girls episodes
- List of The Powerpuff Girls (2016 TV series) episodes
- List of Powerpuff Girls Z episodes
- List of Regular Show episodes
- List of Samurai Jack episodes
- List of The Secret Saturdays episodes
- List of Sonic Boom episodes
- List of Steven Universe episodes
- List of Summer Camp Island episodes
- List of The Super Hero Squad Show episodes
- List of Teen Titans Go! episodes
- List of Transformers: Animated episodes
- List of Transformers: Robots in Disguise (2015 TV series) episodes
- List of Uncle Grandpa episodes
- List of Victor and Valentino episodes
- List of We Bare Bears episodes

== Disney Channel ==
- List of The 7D episodes
- List of A.N.T. Farm episodes
- List of Adventures of the Gummi Bears episodes
- List of Alex & Co. episodes
- List of American Dragon: Jake Long episodes
- List of Amphibia episodes
- List of Andi Mack episodes
- List of As the Bell Rings (American TV series) episodes
- List of Austin & Ally episodes
- List of Backstage episodes
- List of Big City Greens episodes
- List of Big Hero 6: The Series episodes
- List of Bizaardvark episodes
- List of Brandy & Mr. Whiskers episodes
- List of Bunk'd episodes
- List of Coop & Cami Ask the World episodes
- List of Cory in the House episodes
- List of Crash & Bernstein episodes
- List of Danger Bay episodes
- List of Darkwing Duck episodes
- List of Descendants: Wicked World episodes
- List of Dog with a Blog episodes
- List of DuckTales (1987 TV series) episodes
- List of DuckTales (2017 TV series) episodes
- List of Elena of Avalor episodes
- List of The Emperor's New School episodes
- List of Even Stevens episodes
- List of The Famous Jett Jackson episodes
- List of Fish Hooks episodes
- List of Girl Meets World episodes
- List of Good Luck Charlie episodes
- List of Goof Troop episodes
- List of Gravity Falls episodes
- List of Hannah Montana episodes
- List of Hercules (1998 TV series) episodes
- List of House of Mouse episodes
- List of I Didn't Do It episodes
- List of I'm in the Band episodes
- List of Jake and the Never Land Pirates episodes
- List of Jessie episodes
- List of Jonas episodes
- List of K.C. Undercover episodes
- List of Kick Buttowski: Suburban Daredevil episodes
- List of Kickin' It episodes
- List of Kiff episodes
- List of Kim Possible episodes
- List of Kirby Buckets episodes
- List of Lab Rats episodes
- List of Life with Derek episodes
- List of Lilo & Stitch: The Series episodes
- List of Chip 'n Dale: Rescue Rangers episodes
- List of Sofia the First episodes
- List of TaleSpin episodes
- List of Liv and Maddie episodes
- List of Lizzie McGuire episodes
- List of Mickey Mouse episodes
- List of Mighty Med episodes
- List of Milo Murphy's Law episodes
- List of My Babysitter's a Vampire episodes
- List of The New Adventures of Winnie the Pooh episodes
- List of The Owl House episodes
- List of Pair of Kings episodes
- List of PB&J Otter episodes
- List of Penny on M.A.R.S. episodes
- List of Pepper Ann episodes
- List of Phineas and Ferb episodes
- List of The Proud Family episodes
- List of Randy Cunningham: 9th Grade Ninja episodes
- List of Rapunzel's Tangled Adventure episodes
- List of Raven's Home episodes
- List of The Replacements episodes
- List of Road to Avonlea episodes
- List of Shake It Up episodes
- List of So Weird episodes
- List of Sonny with a Chance episodes
- List of Soy Luna episodes
- List of Star vs. the Forces of Evil episodes
- List of Stitch! episodes
- List of Stuck in the Middle episodes
- List of The Suite Life of Karan & Kabir episodes
- List of The Suite Life of Zack & Cody episodes
- List of The Suite Life on Deck episodes
- List of Super Robot Monkey Team Hyperforce Go! episodes
- List of Sydney to the Max episodes
- List of That's So Raven episodes
- List of Timon & Pumbaa episodes
- List of Violetta episodes
- List of Waktu Rehat episodes
- List of Walk the Prank episodes
- List of Wander Over Yonder episodes
- List of Wizards of Waverly Place episodes
- List of Yin Yang Yo! episodes
- List of Zeke and Luther episodes

== Nickelodeon ==
- List of 100 Deeds for Eddie McDowd episodes
- List of Aaahh!!! Real Monsters episodes
- List of Action League Now! episodes
- List of The Adventures of Jimmy Neutron, Boy Genius episodes
- List of The Adventures of Paddington episodes
- List of The Adventures of Pete & Pete episodes
- List of All Grown Up! episodes
- List of All That episodes
- List of Alvinnn!!! and the Chipmunks episodes
- List of The Amanda Show episodes
- List of The Angry Beavers episodes
- List of Are You Afraid of the Dark? episodes
- List of As Told by Ginger episodes
- List of Avatar: The Last Airbender episodes
- List of Back at the Barnyard episodes
- List of The Backyardigans episodes
- List of Bella and the Bulldogs episodes
- List of Ben & Holly's Little Kingdom episodes
- List of Big Time Rush episodes
- List of Blaze and the Monster Machines episodes
- List of Blue's Clues episodes
- List of Breadwinners episodes
- List of Bubble Guppies episodes
- List of Butterbean's Café episodes
- List of The Casagrandes episodes
- List of CatDog episodes
- List of ChalkZone episodes
- List of Clarissa Explains It All episodes
- List of Club 57 episodes
- List of Cousin Skeeter episodes
- List of Danger Force episodes
- List of Danny Phantom episodes
- List of Dora and Friends: Into the City! episodes
- List of Dora the Explorer episodes
- List of Doug episodes
- List of Drake & Josh episodes
- List of Every Witch Way episodes
- List of The Fairly OddParents episodes
- List of Fanboy & Chum Chum episodes
- List of Franklin episodes
- List of the Fresh Beat Band episodes
- List of Game Shakers episodes
- List of Go, Diego, Go! episodes
- List of Harvey Beaks episodes
- List of The Haunted Hathaways episodes
- List of Henry Danger episodes
- List of Hey Arnold! episodes
- List of House of Anubis episodes
- List of Hunter Street episodes
- List of I Am Frankie episodes
- List of iCarly episodes
- List of Instant Mom episodes
- List of Invader Zim episodes
- List of KaBlam! episodes
- List of Kenan & Kel episodes
- List of Kipper episodes
- List of Kung Fu Panda: Legends of Awesomeness episodes
- List of LazyTown episodes
- List of The Legend of Korra episodes
- List of Wild Grinders episodes
- List of Little Bear episodes
- List of Little Bill episodes
- List of The Loud House episodes
- List of Make It Pop episodes
- List of Max & Ruby episodes
- List of The Mighty B! episodes
- List of My Life as a Teenage Robot episodes
- List of Mysticons episodes
- List of The Naked Brothers Band episodes
- List of Ned's Declassified School Survival Guide episodes
- List of Nella the Princess Knight episodes
- List of Ni Hao, Kai-Lan episodes
- List of Nicky, Ricky, Dicky & Dawn episodes
- List of Oh Yeah! Cartoons episodes
- List of Olivia episodes
- List of The Patrick Star Show episodes
- List of Paw Patrol episodes
- List of The Penguins of Madagascar episodes
- List of Peppa Pig episodes
- List of Pig Goat Banana Cricket episodes
- List of Rabbids Invasion episodes
- List of The Ren & Stimpy Show episodes
- List of Rocket Power episodes
- List of Rocko's Modern Life episodes
- List of Romeo! episodes
- List of Rugrats episodes
- List of Rusty Rivets episodes
- List of Ryan's Mystery Playdate episodes
- List of Salute Your Shorts episodes
- List of Sanjay and Craig episodes
- List of School of Rock episodes
- List of The Secret World of Alex Mack episodes
- List of See Dad Run episodes
- List of Shimmer and Shine episodes
- List of Skimo episodes
- List of SpongeBob SquarePants episodes
- List of SpongeBob SquarePants episodes (seasons 1–10)
- List of SpongeBob SquarePants episodes (seasons 11–present)
- List of Sunny Day episodes
- List of T.U.F.F. Puppy episodes
- List of Team Umizoomi episodes
- List of Teenage Mutant Ninja Turtles (2012 TV series) episodes
- List of The Troop episodes
- List of True Jackson, VP episodes
- List of Tyler Perry's Young Dylan episodes
- List of Unfabulous episodes
- List of Victorious episodes
- List of Wallykazam! episodes
- List of Welcome to the Wayne episodes
- List of The Wild Thornberrys episodes
- List of Winx Club episodes
- List of Wonder Pets! episodes
- List of You Can't Do That on Television episodes
- List of Zoey 101 episodes
