= List of In the Life episodes =

The following is a list of episodes from PBS series In the Life, a lesbian, gay, bisexual, and transgender (LGBT) television newsmagazine which aired for 21 seasons until 2012.

Premiering on June 9, 1992, it was the first- and longest-running national LGBT television program in history. The complete series is available for free viewing on the UCLA Film & Television Archive website.

Contents:

Pilot
Season 1 • Season 2 • Season 3 • Season 4 • Season 5 • Season 6 • Season 7
Season 8 • Season 9 • Season 10 • Season 11 • Season 12 • Season 13 • Season 14
Season 15 • Season 16 • Season 17 • Season 18 • Season 19 • Season 20 • Season 21

• References •

== Pilot: 1992 ==
Title	Host	Original air date	Episode	Access
"Pilot"	Kate Clinton	June 1992	001	Watch online

== Season 1: 1992–1993 ==
Title	Host	Original air date	Episode	Access
”In the Life Premiere”	Kate Clinton	October 1992	201	Watch online
"Coming Out (Laughing)"	Kate Clinton	November 1992	202	Watch online
"From Hollywood To Broadway"	Garrett Glaser	December 1992	203	Watch online
"In The Life Goes Country"	Karen Williams	January 1993	204	Watch online
"In The Life Goes To The Movies"	Charles Busch	February 1993	205	Watch online
"It's A Wonderful In The Life – Retrospective"	none	March 1993	206	Watch online
"1993 March on Washington"	Karen Williams, Garrett Glaser	May 1993	207	Watch online

== Season 2: 1993–1994 ==
Title	Host	Original air date	Episode	Access
"Gay Pride, Great Performances"	none	October 1993	301	Watch online
"School's Out: Lesbian & Gay Youth"	Karen Williams	November 1993	302	Watch online
"Untitled"	Katherine Linton, Greg Watt	December 1993	303	Watch online
"Untitled"	Katherine Linton, Greg Watt	January 1994	304	Watch online
"Untitled"	Katherine Linton, Greg Watt	February 1994	305	Watch online
"Untitled"	Katherine Linton, Greg Watt	March 1994	306	Watch online
"Untitled"	Katherine Linton, Greg Watt	April 1994	307	Watch online
"Untitled"	Katherine Linton, Greg Watt	May 1994	308	Watch online
"Stonewall 25: Global Voices of Pride & Protest"	Katherine Linton, Garrett Glaser	June 1994	309	Watch online

== Season 3: 1994–1995 ==
Title	Host	Original air date	Episode	Access
"Different Drummers"	Katherine Linton	November 1994	401	Watch online
"Civil Rights, Gay Rights"	Katherine Linton	February 1995	402	Watch online
"Veterans and the War on AIDS"	Katherine Linton	April 1995	403	Watch online
"Big Cities, Small Towns"	Katherine Linton	June 1995	404	Watch online

== Season 4: 1995–1996 ==
Title	Host	Original air date	Episode	Access
"From Beijing... To Wong Foo"	Katherine Linton	October 9, 1995	501	Watch online
"Gay & Catholic"	Katherine Linton	December 13, 1995	502	Watch online
"Black History Month"	Katherine Linton	February 7, 1996	503	Watch online
"The Gay Vote"	Katherine Linton	April 24, 1996	504	Watch online
"Lights, Camera, Activism I!"	Katherine Linton	June 25, 1996	505	Watch online

== Season 5: 1996–1997 ==
Title	Host	Original air date	Episode	Access
"The Politics of Pride"	Katherine Linton	October 27, 1996	601	Watch online
"The State of AIDS"	Katherine Linton	December 1, 1996	602	Watch online
"Image, Identity, & Diversity"	Katherine Linton	February 2, 1997	603	Watch online
"As American As Apple Pie I"	Katherine Linton	April 21, 1997	604	Watch online
"Lights, Camera, Activism II!"	Katherine Linton	June 19, 1997	605	Watch online
"In The Life's Fifth Anniversary"	none	August 28, 1997	606	Watch online

== Season 6: 1997–1998 ==
Title	Host	Original air date	Episode	Access
"Back to School: Youth and Education"	Katherine Linton	October 29, 1997	701	Watch online
"1997 Year in Review"	Katherine Linton	January 11, 1998	702	Watch online
"Image, Identity, & Diversity: Crossing Borders"	Katherine Linton	February 9, 1998	703	Watch online
"In The Life Goes Global"	Katherine Linton	April 14, 1998	704	Watch online
"American As Apple Pie II"	Katherine Linton	June 29, 1998	705	Watch online
"Lights, Camera, Activism! III"	Katherine Linton	August 7, 1998	706	Watch online

== Season 7: 1998–1999 ==
Title	Host	Original air date	Episode	Access
"7th Season Premiere"	Katherine Linton	October 7, 1998	801	Watch online
"December '98/January '99"	Katherine Linton	December 16, 1998	802	Watch online
"February/March 1999"	Katherine Linton	February 10, 1999	803	Watch online
"April/May 1999 On The Move"	Katherine Linton	April 20, 1999	804	Watch online
"1999 Gay Pride Episode"	Katherine Linton	June 24, 1999	805	Watch online
"Lights, Camera, Activism! IV"	Katherine Linton	August 3, 1999	806	Watch online

== Season 8: 1999–2000 ==
Title	Host	Original air date	Episode	Access
"8th Season Premiere"	Katherine Linton	October 21, 1999	901	Watch online
"December '99/January 2000"	Katherine Linton	December 17, 1999	902	Watch online
"February/March 2000"	Katherine Linton	February 1, 2000	903	Watch online
"April/May 2000"	Katherine Linton	April 6, 2000	904	Watch online
"June/July 2000"	Katherine Linton	June 15, 2000	905	Watch online
"In The Life Goes Global (Repeat: 704 July '98)"	Katherine Linton	August 24, 2000	906	Watch online

== Season 9: 2000–2001 ==
Title	Host	Original air date	Episode	Access
"Season Premiere"	Katherine Linton	October 2000	1001	Watch online
"Retrospective"	Katherine Linton	November 2000	1002	Watch online
"Supporting Gay Youth (Reversion)"	Wilson Cruz	December 2000	1003	Watch online
"History & Humor"	Katherine Linton	January 2001	1004	Watch online
"From Rights to Reverence (Reversion)"	RuPaul Andre Charles	February 2001	1005	Watch online
"Challenging Tradition (Repeat 902 Dec./Jan. '00)"	Katherine Linton	March 2001	1006	Watch online
"Building Safe Havens"	Katherine Linton	April 2001	1007	Watch online
"Cultural Legacies (Reversion)"	Katherine Linton	May 2001	1008	Watch online
"Pride"	Katherine Linton	June 2001	1009	Watch online
"Movers & Shakers"	Katherine Linton	July 2001	1010	Watch online
"History & Humor (Repeat 1004 Jan. '01)"	Katherine Linton	August 2001	1011	Watch online
"Special Edition (Reversion)"	Cherry Jones	September 2001	1012	Watch online

== Season 10: 2001–2002 ==
Title	Host	Original air date	Episode	Access
"10th Anniversary Season Premiere"	Katherine Linton	October 2001	1101	Watch online
"Vital Discoveries"	Katherine Linton	November 2001	1102	Watch online
"Friends & Family (Reversion)"	Katherine Linton	December 2001	1103	Watch online
"Out In The Workplace"	Katherine Linton	January 2002	1104	Watch online
"God & Hollywood"	Katherine Linton	February 2002	1105	Watch online
"Taking the Lead (Reversion)"	Katherine Linton	March 2002	1106	Watch online
"Comfort in Crisis"	Katherine Linton	April 2002	1107	Watch online
"Building Safe Havens (Repeat 1107 April '01)"	Katherine Linton	May 2002	1108	Watch online
"10th Anniversary Edition"	Katherine Linton	June 2002	1109	Watch online
"Hands-On Heroes"	Katherine Linton	July 2002	1110	Watch online
"Supporting Youth (Repeat 1003 Dec. '00)"	Wilson Cruz	August 2002	1111	Watch online
"LA Edition (Reversion)"	Mark Christopher	September 2002	1112	Watch online

== Season 11: 2002–2003 ==
Title	Host	Original air date	Episode	Access
"Season Premiere"	John Bartlett	October 2002	1201	Watch online
"The Homefront"	Bill Brochtrup	November 2002	1202	Watch online
"Movers and Shakers (Repeat 1010 July '01)"	Katherine Linton	December 2002	1203	Watch online
"Vital Discoveries (Repeat 1102)"	Katherine Linton	January 2003	1204	Watch online
"Outfront"	Staceyann Chin	February 2003	1205	Watch online
"The Legacy of AIDS (Reversion)"	Bill Brochtrup	March 2003	1206	Watch online
"Stealing Home"	E. Lynn Harris	April 2003	1207	Watch online
"The Fundamental Fight (Reversion)"	Cherry Jones and David Marshall Grant	May 2003	1208	Watch online
"The Body Politic"	Denis O'Hare	June 2003	1209	Watch online
"War Stories (Partial Reversion)"	Bill Brochtrup	July 2003	1210	Watch online
"The Legacy of AIDS (Repeat 1206 March '03)"	Cherry Jones and David Marshall Grant	August 2003	1211	Watch online
"Family Law (Reversion)"	Emanuel Xavier	September 2003	1212	Watch online

== Season 12: 2003–2004 ==
Title	Host	Original air date	Episode	Access
"Violent Opposition"	André De Shields	October 2003	1301	Watch online
"Borders"	Lesley Gore	November 2003	1302	Watch online
"The Fundamental Fight (Repeat 1208 May '03)"	David Marshall Grant	December 2003	1303	Watch online
"The Culture Wars (Reversion)"	Bill Brochtrup	January 2004	1304	Watch online
"The Homosexual Lifestyle"	Staceyann Chin	February 2004	1305	Watch online
"The Latest Trend"	Cherry Jones	March 2004	1306	Watch online
"The Homefront (Repeat 1202 Nov. '02)"	Bill Brochtrup	April 2004	1307	Watch online
"The Art World (Reversion)"	Frank DeCaro	May 2004	1308	Watch online
"Social Engineering"	Cherry Jones	June 2004	1309	Watch online
"Historical Blindness"	Lesley Gore	July 2004	1310	Watch online
"War Stories (Repeat 1210 July '03)"	Bill Brochtrup	August 2004	1311	Watch online
"Mergers and Acquisitions"	Emil Wilbekin	September 2004	1312	Watch online

== Season 13: 2004–2005 ==
Title	Host	Original air date	Episode	Access
"The Hidden Agenda"	Alan Cumming	October 2004	1401	Watch online
"Generation Q"	Staceyann Chin	November 2004	1402	Watch online
"Mergers and Acquisitions (Repeat 1312 Sept. '04)"	Emil Wilbekin	December 2004	1403	Watch online
"Image Conscience"	Laura Linney	January 2005	1404	Watch online
"Historical Blindness (Repeat 1310 July '04)"	Lesley Gore	February 2005	1405	Watch online
"American Gender"	RuPaul Charles	March 2005	1406	Watch online
"Tax-Paying Citizens"	Bill Brochtrup	April 2005	1407	Watch online
"My Fair Ladies"	Cherry Jones	May 2005	1408	Watch online
"Setting the Record Straight"	Janeane Garofalo	June 2005	1409	Watch online
"Image Conscience (Repeat 1404 Jan. '05)"	Laura Linney	July 2005	1410	Watch online
"Survival of the Fittest"	Billy Porter	August 2005	1411	Watch online
"524,000 And Counting"	Sharon Gless	September 2005	1412	Watch online

== Season 14: 2005–2006 ==
Title	Host	Original air date	Episode	Access
"Every Picture Tells A Story"	Kate Clinton	October 2005	1501	Watch online
"Setting the Record Straight (Repeat 1409 June '05)"	Janeane Garofalo	November 2005	1502	Watch online
"Downsizing Stereotypes"	Alan Cumming	December 2005	1503	Watch online
"The Principles of the Youth"	Ani DiFranco	January 2006	1504	Watch online
"The Right to Love"	Charles Busch	February 2006	1505	Watch online
"524,000 And Counting (Repeat 1412 Sep. '05)"	Sharon Gless	March 2006	1506	Watch online
"The Power of Literacy"	Michael Cunningham	April 2006	1507	Watch online
"Family Ties"	Rosie O'Donnell	May 2006	1508	Watch online
"Pride in Action"	Kate Clinton	June 2006	1509	Watch online
"Every Picture Tells A Story (Repeat 1501 Oct. '05)"	Kate Clinton	July 2006	1510	Watch online
"Pieces of History"	Cherry Jones	August 2006	1511	Watch online
"My Life's Work"	Alan Cumming	September 2006	1512	Watch online

== Season 15: 2006–2007 ==
Title	Host	Original air date	Episode	Access
"Inside Out"	Cherry Jones	October 2006	1601	Watch online
"Family Ties (Repeat 1508 May '06)"	Rosie O'Donnell	November 2006	1602	Watch online
"The Changing Face of AIDS"	Wilson Cruz	December 2006	1603	Watch online
"Breaking New Ground"	Anthony Rapp	January 2007	1604	Watch online
"The Principles of Youth (Repeat 1504 Jan. '06)"	Ani DiFranco	February 2007	1605	Watch online
"Leading Ladies"	Martina Navratilova	March 2007	1606	Watch online
"The Last Closet"	Diana Nyad	April 2007	1607	Watch online
"My Life's Work (Repeat 1512 Sep. '06)"	Alan Cumming	May 2007	1608	Watch online
"Voices of Pride"	John Amaechi	June 2007	1609	Watch online
"Gender Revolution"	Charles Busch	July 2007	1610	Watch online
"Every Picture Tells A Story (Repeat 1501 Oct. '05)"	Kate Clinton	August 2007	1611	Watch online
"Looking Back, Moving Forward"	Katherine Linton	September 2007	1612	Watch online

== Season 16: 2007–2008 ==
Title	Original air date	Episode	Access
"A New Look"	October 2007	1701	Watch online
"Breaking New Ground (Repeat 1604 Jan. '07)"	November 2007	1702	Watch online
"Building On The Past"	December 2007	1703	Watch online
"Wide Stance"	January 2008	1704	Watch online
"A Visible History"	February 2008	1705	Watch online
"Voices of Sisterhood"	March 2008	1706	Watch online
"Challenging Convention"	April 2008	1707	Watch online
"Voices of Pride (Repeat 1609 June '07)"	May 2008	1708	Watch online
"Leading the Way"	June 2008	1709	Watch online
"Inside Out (Repeat 1601 Oct. '06)"	July 2008	1710	Watch online
"Talking It Out"	August 2008	1711	Watch online
"A Festival of Film"	September 2008	1712	Watch online

== Season 17: 2008–2009 ==
Title	Original air date	Code
"Civil Rites & Civil Rights"	October 2008	1801
"Lifesavers"	November 2008	1802
"AIDS Is Still A Big Deal"	December 2008	1803
"Ties That Bind"	January 2009	1804
"Mobilizing Hope"	February 2009	1805
"Women Through The Lens"	March 2009	1806
"Gender Revived"	April 2009	1807
"Confronting Crisis"	May 2009	1808
"40th Anniversary of Stonewall"	June 2009	1809
"Civil Disobedience"	July 2009	1810
"Coming Together"	August 2009	1811
"It's About Time"	September 2009	1812

== Season 18: 2009–2010 ==
Title	Original air date	Code
"Living on the Margins"	October 2009	1901
"An IN THE LIFE Special Presentation: Preacher's Sons"	November 2009	1902
"Creating Solutions"	December 2009	1903
"Profiles in Leadership"	January 2010	1904
"Best of A Conversation With..."	February 2010	1905
"A Right to Live"	March 2010	1906
"Dismantling Hate"	April 2010	1907
"It's About Time"	May 2010	1908
"Intersections of Church & State"	June 2010	1909
"Defying Stereotypes"	July 2010	1910
"Twilight No More"	August 2010	1911
"The State of Equality"	September 2010	1912

== Season 19: 2010–2011 ==
Title	Original air date	Code
"Surviving the Past"	October 2010	2001
"IN THE LIFE Presents: Gen Silent"	November 2010	2002
"The Cost of Stigma"	December 2010	2003
"Hidden Histories"	January 2011	2004
"You Are Not Alone"	February 2011	2005
"Our Bodies, Our Rights"	March 2011	2006
"Backlash Or Evolution?"	April 2011	2007
"Coalitions and Allies"	May 2011	2008
"A Message of Hope"	June 2011	2009
"The Art of Change"	July 2011	2010
"Gaycation"	August 2011	2011
"Changing the Game"	September 2011	2012

== Season 20: 2011–2012 ==
Title	Original air date	Code
"20th Anniversary Season Premiere"	October 2011	2101
"Finding Home"	November 2011	2102
"30 Years Positive"	December 2011	2103
"First Class Citizens"	January 2012	2104
"Perpetuating Stigma"	February 2012	2105
"Revisiting Hidden Histories"	March 2012	2106
"Becoming Me"	April 2012	2107
"Remaining Vigilant"	May 2012	2108
"Orgullo Latino"	June 2012	2109
"Words Do Matter"	July 2012	2110
"Married But Not Equal"	August 2012	2111
"The Truth Comes Out"	September 2012	2112

== Season 21: 2012 ==
Title	Original air date	Code
"Beyond the Rhetoric"	October 2012	2201
"Foster Care's Invisible Youth"	November 2012	2202
"Farewell IN THE LIFE"	December 2012	2203
