= List of VR Troopers episodes =

This is an episode listing of VR Troopers, a family science fiction action series on Discovery Networks Latin America / US HIspanic. The series stars Brad Hawkins as Ryan Steele, who fights industralist Carl Ziktor's virtual alter-ego Grimlord and his army with the help of his friends. Following a pilot episode on March 1, 1994, the series ran for two seasons from September 3, 1994 to February 21, 1996.

== Series overview ==
Season	Episodes	Originally released	
Season	Episodes	First released	Last released
1	52	September 3, 1994	February 28, 1995
2	40	September 11, 1995	February 21, 1996

== Episodes ==
=== Season 1 (1994–95) ===
No.	Title	Directed by	Written by	Original release date
1	"The Battle Begins"	Worth Keeter & Shuki Levy	Douglas Sloan	September 3, 1994
2	"The Battle Begins"	Worth Keeter & Shuki Levy	Douglas Sloan	September 10, 1994
Ryan, Kaitlin and J.B. are called to meet the mysterious Professor Hart at his lab in the mountains. On the way, they are attacked from the air by Air Striker and Fighterbot, and on the ground by Skugs. They make it to the lab, receive their powers and are sent to fight Grimlord's (Ziktor when in his human guise) forces. Ryan remains to battle Gunbots, Tankbots and Polarbot. Kaitlin and J.B. fight the Skugs and one of Grimlord's most powerful robots, the mighty Congbot. J.B. and Kaitlin are successful, but during a battle with The Decimator, Ryan is thrown from a cliff and lies injured in a deserted quarry. Kaitlin and J.B. locate Ryan in the quarry and hurry to his rescue. After a Skug fight, he is brought back to the lab and repaired. Through the use of virtual reality, the Professor shows them what may be in store for them if they continue their quest. Meanwhile, Grimlord is planning a full scale assault on the planet. The teens ask the Professor what they can do to prepare for Grimlord's next attack. He instructs them to practice their martial arts skills. While out taking photos, Kaitlin discovers Grimlord's troops moving into position. She alerts Ryan and J.B. and all three transform and unite to fight and save the planet. They are victorious and, in the end, vow to do everything in their power to make sure the people of the world are safe from Grimlord and his evil mutants.
3	"Error in the System"	Worth Keeter	Adam Gilad; Mark Litton	September 14, 1994
Grimlord has caused a malfunction in the computer systems using a mysterious virus, and only the V.R. Troopers can stop it.
4	"Lost Memories"	John Grant Weil	Margo McCahon	September 15, 1994
When a homeless lady wanders into the dojo with amnesia, the kids try to help. Tao cooks herbal food, students pass out flyers, J.B. uses his computer and Kaitlin runs her photo on the front page of Woody's newspaper. Ryan also loses his memory when he collides in midair with Airstriker, sent by Grimlord, to destroy him. Professor Hart and Jeb try to bring back Ryan's memory in the lab, while J.B. and Kaitlin battle the Laser Bot and General Ivar's robot vehicles. The kids win and the love of his dog brings back Ryan's memory. The newspaper photo reunites the homeless lady with her family.
5	"Battle for the Books"	John Grant Weil	Adam Gilad	September 16, 1994
Ziktor wants to destroy all books that teach about solar energy. He starts with Mr. Reese's bookmobile, as a way of getting at J.B. The boys are getting ready for a doubles Karate tournament when Kaitlin alerts them and they rush to save J.B.'s dad from the attacking Skugs. The boys win the first round of the tournament, but join Kaitlin between rounds to take on The Eliminator who is attacking the Central Library. Ryan forgets his virtualizer back at the Dojo, so Kaitlin and J.B. go to fight while Ryan retrieves it. Using the new Vortex power, J.B. takes the battle with Grimlord's airforce to a virtual quarry. Ryan joins them and the robots are defeated. The boys win the tournament and J.B. gives his father the prize money to fix the bookmobile. Ryan surprises J.B. by adding his prize money to J.B.'s, sacrificing his goal of becoming partners with Tao in the dojo.
6	"Oh Brother"	John Grant Weil	J.K. Richards	September 19, 1994
Ryan and J.B. are training two young brothers who argue with each other all the time. Ziktor/Grimlord decides to unleash two monster robot brothers of his own, the Swordbots. Kaitlin and the brothers stumble across Grimlord's "Power Diverter" and the brothers are captured by Skugs. To track them, Professor Hart invents a "virtual blood hound" using a robotic "Sniffer", linked to Jeb's real nose. The brothers argue so much the Skugs separate them. Kaitlin and J.B. are able to free one boy while Ryan fights the Swordbot robots and frees the other boy. After this, the boys agree not to argue with each other and they win the tournament.
7	"Grimlord's Challenge"	Worth Keeter	Margo McCahon	September 20, 1994
A neighborhood policewoman offers Tao and the kids a challenge: turn Becky into a karate contender in two weeks and win $1000 from the Police Association to help other street kids. Ryan accepts the challenge and Kaitlin commits to help. When Grimlord hears about this offer, he issues his own challenge: his robots will compete to see who will face the V.R. Troopers at the reality barrier. Hammerbot meets Ryan in the Forest of Virtual Reality. Spiderbot faces J.B. at the top of the world and Kaitlin must hold back General Ivar's robot assault vehicles and fighter jets. Jeb becomes Becky's friend and helps her to stay on track and win a ribbon in the beginners division at the Inter-dojo tournament.
8	"Computer Captive"	Worth Keeter	Robert Hughes	September 21, 1994
While helping Kaitlin install a difficult graphics program in her computer at the paper, J.B. gets sucked into the monitor and disappears. He is held in Grimlord's dungeon in virtual reality where his V.R. powers are drained. Kaitlin goes to the dojo and alerts Ryan. They try to contact The Professor using the dojo computer, but are nearly taken captive via the monitor themselves. Skugs appear and they do battle in the empty dojo. After defeating the skugs, Ryan and Kaitlin go to the lab to consult with the Professor. Ryan decides to allow himself to be captured and taken to Grimlord's dungeon in an effort to save his friend. Like J.B., Ryan gets sucked in through a computer screen. Once in the dungeon, he battles Grimlord's mutant robots and escapes with his friend. Outside the dungeon, Ryan confronts Battlebot in a one-on-one confrontation, ultimately defeating the robot. J.B. is taken back to the lab where the Professor restores his powers. Ryan's friendship for J.B. saved J.B.'s life.
9	"Kaitlin's Little Helper"	John Grant Weil	Douglas Sloan	September 22, 1994
Kaitlin's cousin, Betsy, comes for a visit. She aspires to be a reporter like Kaitlin and, while on a story, discovers green slime oozing from the grass in the park. Kaitlin and the guys analyze the slime and discover it is a defoliant that will destroy all of the plants and trees. Meanwhile, Betsy is captured by Skugs. Kaitlin and the guys rescue her and face Grimlord's mutants. In the end, everyone is safe and Woody loves the article that Kaitlin and Betsy wrote about the slime.
10	"The Virtual Spy"	John Grant Weil	Mark Litton	September 23, 1994
Grimlord plants a spy in reality, in the form of an investigative reporter named Jeremy whom Woody hires at the Underground Voice Daily. After Jeremy helps Kaitlin, J.B. and Ryan in a Skug fight, they take him into their personal lives. His robotic nature allows him to outperform them at martial arts, computing and reporting, bruising their egos a little. When Woody assigns him to investigate the V.R. Troopers, Kaitlin checks into his background. With the Professor's help, she and J.B. discover he is a virtual being, but their discovery comes too late. Jeremy, using computer technology, traps J.B. and Kaitlin in the lab and rigs the portal to send Ryan to a hidden virtual combat zone. Jeremy transforms into a robot to fight Ryan. Kaitlin and J.B. free themselves, take the V.R. Skybase and, amid aerial attacks, search for Ryan. Finally, Ryan defeats the robot and Kaitlin and J.B. bring him back to reality.
11	"The Virtual V-6"	Worth Keeter	Douglas Sloan	September 26, 1994
Kaitlin is paid a visit by a young inventor who has plans for a pollution-free motorcycle engine. After showing the guys the plans, they decided to build a motorcycle version in V.R. and put it in J.B.'s Skycycle. Meanwhile, Ziktor/Grimlord, concerned that the engine will destroy his oil business, sends Skugs to the Dojo to look for the disk with the engine's design on it. They trash the place after a fight with Tao and take all the disks they can find. The kids come back to find the place a mess. They then hear that a busload of kids has been hijacked. The teens contact the Professor, who alerts J.B. Ryan and Kaitlin transform. Kaitlin fights Skugs as Ryan battles Grimlord's Leviatrons which have broken through the reality barrier. They all win their fights, including J.B. against Drillbot. In the end, the invention is turned over to Woody's friend who owns a motorcycle company.
12	"No One's Friend"	Worth Keeter	Mark Litton	September 27, 1994
In Ziktor's tower, Ziktor decides to turn the Troopers against each other. He sends a skug to the Dojo disguised as a martial arts student who spars with J.B., transferring to him an electrical charge that, in turn, is delivered to Kaitlin. The charge changes their personalities. J.B. picks a fight with Ryan and Kaitlin encourages J.B. Ryan is stunned at the change. Troubled, Ryan talks to Jeb who agrees to accompany him to the Underground to confront Kaitlin. At the paper, Jeb causes trouble for Percy; Kaitlin tells Ryan they are no longer friends, but she will give him her car to fly to a friend and meet with J.B. Once there, Ryan and Jeb discover they have been set up: they fight skugs and flee in the car, enduring Polarbot's weaponry fire on the ground and in the air. The boy and dog discover J.B. and Kaitlin are firing on them, too, from the mother ship. Landing at the lab, Ryan manages to trap Kaitlin and J.B. in an electronic field. He leaves to defeat Polarbot, an act that will return his friends to him. Inadvertently, Jeb frees the two evil Troopers. Ryan fights J.B., Kaitlin and the Polarbot in order to win back his friends.
13	"Dogmatic Change"	John Grant Weil	Sam Okun	September 28, 1994
Grimlord comes up with the idea of turning dog pound pets (and more) into rabid mutant monsters for his own army. Ziktor disguises his voice and pretends to hire Kaitlin to shoot a dog food commercial, knowing that she will bring Jeb, the first subject to be turned into a mutant. Jeb is slipped into a mutating agent and turns into a monster. Ryan goes to a zoo, where the mutant Jeb is causing havoc. J.B. and Kaitlin are off to find and then destroy the factory that is creating the substance used for the transformation. Grimlord's forces give them some trouble, but they outsmart them. Ryan has Professor Hart send a virtual reality image of a normal dog to the zoo, hoping that the mutant Jeb will recognize what he used to be, and then desire to go back to that state. It works, but not before Grimlord's Toxoid Robot sprays Jeb with a disintegrating agent. Professor Hart saves Jeb from disintegrating.
14	"Searching For Tyler Steele"	Debra Spelling	Douglas Sloan	September 30, 1994
While on a hike, the kids and Jeb discover an abandoned building in the middle of nowhere. Kaitlin takes a photo of the building and spots a man in a room with bars on the windows, sitting next to a strange "S" symbol on the wall. After enhancing the pictures at the lab, the teens discover that the man looks a lot like Ryan's father. Grimlord launches an attack. While J.B. and Kaitlin deal with the attack, Ryan returns to the building to find his dad. Grimlord is defeated but Ryan gets to the building too late and finds it empty.
15	"Save the Trees"	Worth Keeter	J.K. Richards	October 3, 1994
Grimlord (a.k.a. Ziktor) needs an old growth forest clear for a massive break-through from Virtual Reality. The Troopers confront Ziktor, who lies and says he will stop. Discovering that the logging is to continue, they try to get Mayor Rooney to stop it, but the Mayor's wife thinks the forest is full of savage animals (Ziktor sneakily convinced her of this) and she supports clearing the forest of these beasts. Professor Hart recognizes that the forest bugs that Jeb has picked up are endangered insects, and they can get a Federal injunction to stop the logging. They stop Ziktor's chain saws, but Grimlord sends Chain-Bot and General Ivar to destroy the forest. The Troopers return to the forest, when the earth shakes from Grimlord's attack. They split up, Ryan tackling Chain-Bot and J.B. and Kaitlin facing General Ivar's tanks. The Troopers are victorious and the forest is saved. Back at the U.V.D., Ziktor is tricked into building a park, the Mayor congratulates the Troopers, and Jeb gives the Mayor's wife endangered fleas.
16	"A Dirty Trick"	John Grant Weil	Robert Hughes	October 4, 1994
A celebration is held on the tenth anniversary of Tao Dojo and Grimlord sends his Evil Magician to abduct the real magician and catch the Troopers with their guard down. Using Kaitlin and JB to assist him in a trick, he steals their virtualizers. In the pursuit that follows, JB and Kaitlin battle Skugs while Ryan transforms and fights the Magician, now in his robot form. Tricked into a fall from a high rooftop, Ryan is damaged and taken to the lab for repair. A plan is set: Kaitlin and JB will use the flying car to locate the Magician and Ryan will transform and fight the Magician for the virtualizers. The Magician is located and a battle ensues between him and Ryan. Kaitlin and JB are caught in a dogfight in the air above. They are ultimately victorious and the virtualizers are returned.
17	"Kaitlin's Front Page"	Debra Spelling	Robert Hughes	October 5, 1994
Kaitlin receives a hot tip from a mysterious, shadowy informant: details and a map to a secret illegal weapons testing plant outside Crossroads City. Eager for a major front-page story, she heads out to investigate, though she invites Ryan and JB (who are busy at the dojo) to join her later. It turns out to be a trap orchestrated by Grimlord. The informant was actually a Skug in disguise, and Kaitlin is quickly captured by Skugs at the site. She is strapped to a ticking bomb as bait to lure the other Troopers into an ambush. Ryan and JB arrive to rescue her and are attacked by two of Grimlord's virtual monsters: the punch-happy Metalbo and the slithery Cobrot. The Troopers must defeat the villains, rescue Kaitlin before the bomb explodes, and deal with the larger threat of the weapons plant, while Kaitlin hopes to still get her big scoop.
18	"The Dognapping"	Debra Spelling	Margo McCahon	October 7, 1994
Skugs dognap Jeb when he steps outside for a nature call. They take him to Grimlord, who is angered by the dog's wise-cracking mouth. Although some robots want to terminate Jeb, Grimlord decides that he will set a trap. When the Troopers come to rescue Jeb, the warriors will be waiting. Crabor promises to do the job, Torpedo Bot provides a back up, while General Ivar sends the Frogbot to ensure success. Led by a phone call to the harbor, V.R. Troopers battle Grimlord's forces as Jeb gives a play-by-play from his vantage point. The Troopers win and are reunited with their mascot. Jeb decides that it is lot safer inside the lab.
19	"My Dog's Girlfriend"	Worth Keeter	Margo McCahon	October 10, 1994
Jeb is depressed because he is fallen for Princess the Dog and her puppies, but Princess's owner, Mrs. Burns, calls Jeb a pound mutt and blocks their romance, even though Mrs. Burns' little boy, Timmy, is all for it. When Kaitlin does a dog show photo session, Jeb and Princess sneak into the darkroom. Mrs. Burns is furious and the puppies run wild. Kaitlin takes Jeb to see Princess at Mrs. Burns' house and a Skug appears. During the fight, the puppies are stolen. Jeb promises Princess that Ryan will get the pups back, but Grimlord wants the puppies in virtual reality to lure the Troopers into the firing range of his ultimate robot - The Trooper Terminator. Jeb asks Ryan to help, so the V.R. Troopers battle Grimlord's best robots to rescue the puppies. Woody's newspaper throws a "Puppy Homecoming" party attended by Mayor Rooney and his wife. Jeb humiliates Mrs. Rooney by pulling a thread on her dress, which unravels, as she runs screaming from the party in her white slip.
20	"Digging For Fire"	John Grant Weil	Adam Gilad	October 11, 1994
Following an earthquake, the teens discover, using the help of Virtual Reality, that someone is digging shafts to the center of the Earth under a downtown building. When they look into it, they are confronted by Skugs and Fistbot. After a bigger earthquake, the Troopers simulate what would happen if Grimlord reached the core, which is Armageddon. They get into the building and make their way through a series of traps and ambushes. Ryan takes on Fistbot, defeating him. J.B. and Kaitlin vortex the skugs and General Ivar's airforce to the Virtual Reality Quarry and defeat them and a tank force. Kaitlin calls upon her V.R. Battle Club and destroys the tunnel. The city is saved. Ryan applies the lesson of care and dedication to his search for his father.
21	"The Great Brain Robbery"	Worth Keeter	Douglas Sloan	October 12, 1994
The military has been robbed of the preserved brain of the greatest military mind in history. Grimlord wants to use the brain in his scheme to take over the planet, but General Ivar decides that he has had enough of Grimlord's orders, and, using a plan that the brain has come up with, plots to freeze all of the power lines in the city. If successful, the military will be helpless when the virtual army attacks. The Troopers must recover the brain and stop General Ivar to preserve peace in Cross World City.
22	"The Dojo Plot"	Debra Spelling	Stewart St. John	October 14, 1994
When Tao is informed that the Dojo is on the verge of shutting down due to financial problems, Ryan, Kaitlin and J.B. organize a fund-raiser to bail it out of jeopardy. Meanwhile, Ziktor/Grimlord plans to buy the building, demolish it and erect a power plant in its place. Further, he intends to install his new Weather Control Device, a system capable of controlling the world's weather and thereby giving him complete global power, within the plant. When Ryan, J.B. and Kaitlin learn of the device and attempt to destroy it, they must face the awesome power of Lizardbot and Cannonbot. Ultimately, they succeed and obliterate the weapon. The fund-raiser is a success and the Dojo is saved.
23	"Grimlord's Greatest Hits"	John Grant Weil	Gil Rosencrantz; Douglas Sloan	October 19, 1994
The teens are going to put on a dance-a-thon so that a student of theirs, Brandon, can afford to go to a special music academy. Grimlord decides to hypnotize everyone so that he can defeat the Troopers and play his evil music for everyone, causing them to become Zombies. Grimlord's plan goes awry as J.B. and Brandon are not hypnotized. Grimlord then kidnaps Brandon. The Troopers must infiltrate Grimlord's disk plant, rescue Brandon, and fight the evil Diskbot.
24	"The Disappearance"	John Grant Weil	Robert Hughes	October 25, 1994
Grimlord plots to overtake reality by making his mutants invisible. At the same time, Tao tries to teach the Troopers the importance of stealth in combat. In a comic sequence, they try to attack Tao, but are unsuccessful. They step outside to cool off. While alone in the dojo, Jeb is used as a guinea pig by Skugs and made invisible. He attacks them. Ryan discovers the skug fight and helps the invisible Jeb to defeat them. They take Jeb to the lab for treatment, where they learn that Grimlord is invading, using the power of invisibility. The Troopers transform. Ryan meets Spitbot and Toxoid in a battle where they can disappear. Kaitlin and J.B. take on the skugs. They are ultimately victorious. Back at the lab, Professor Hart is successful at making Jeb only half visible (his front half). Ryan learns to appreciate things in life before they disappear.
25	"Nightmares"	John Grant Weil	Al Winchell	October 31, 1994
Kaitlin starts having dreams about the power and invincibility of Grimlord's forces. The nightmares are so vivid that she cannot sleep and her work starts to suffer. Grimlord is using his "Dreammaster" robot to use her worst fears against her. Her condition deteriorates until she is forced to tell the boys that she feels she can no longer be an effective V.R. Trooper. She is taken to the lab, where they learn what Grimlord has been putting into her mind. The Dreammaster challenges Ryan and he goes off to fight him. Grimlord uses this opportunity to launch an attack to separate and conquer the Troopers. J.B. has to fight a mutant and then a full scale air and ground assault. Things go bad when the Troopers are in danger of being overwhelmed. At the last moment, Kaitlin overcomes her fears and charges in to save the day.
26	"Secret Admirer"	John Grant Weil	J.K. Richards	November 3, 1994
Kaitlin receives flowers from a secret admirer, who is revealed to be Grimlord. Colonel Ice-Bot is developing evil flowers to capture and destroy the Troopers. The flowers keep coming and Percy tries to claim they are from him, but his sneezing demonstrates that he is too allergic to have anything to do with flowers. Ryan and J.B. stake out the U.V.D. Office and trail the delivery person who turns into a Skug and a fight ensues. They hurry back to warn Kaitlin, but she has just sniffed the toxic flower Colonel Ice-Bot sent. She feels very weak, so the guys take her to the lab, where she disintegrates. She has been pulled into an inter-reality prison. J.B. makes an antidote and crosses the barrier to Kaitlin. He tricks General Ivar and frees Kaitlin, but Ivar releases the Pollen-Bot. Ivar, and his forces, follow right behind J.B., but he defeats them and returns to reality. The Troopers are reunited.
27	"Grimlord's House of Fear"	John Grant Weil; Robert Hughes	Margo McCahon; Gil Rosencrantz; Douglas Sloan	November 4, 1994
Inside a house in a quiet neighborhood, Colonel Ice-Bot has penetrated the reality barrier with an ionic cyber beam. Grimlord wants him to build a robot to open the reality barrier from the Troopers' side so that General Ivar'S armies can attack. Kaitlin, Ryan and J.B. investigate and meet Manuel, a young boy who insists the house is haunted. He promises to take a photo of the ghost inside. Kaitlin tries to convince Woody at the newspaper to do a story on the haunted house, but he is not convinced. When Manuel calls, Kaitlin rushes to the house to take a photo of the robot. Kaitlin and J.B. battle the Vacbot in Cross World City while Ryan tracks Colonel Ice-Bot to the Air Castle and destroys his database and flying laboratory.
28	"Three Strikes"	Robert Hughes	Mark Litton	November 7, 1994
J.B. coaches one of two rival baseball teams for a benefit game to raise money to upgrade the field and to secure the lease. Ziktor wants to end the lease and take the land. After Skugs fail to kidnap one of J.B.'s players, Ziktor orders Metalbot to take the boy from his apartment complex. Ryan chases the robots but loses them. Search parties go out looking for the boy, but the Troopers know he won't be in any ordinary place. They transform, searching the virtual pathways. Grimlord attacks the Skybase, delaying them. Ryan is left alone to fight Metalbot in a desperate effort to save the boy.
29	"Danger in the Deep"	John Grant Weil	J.K. Richards	November 8, 1994
The teens are enjoying a perfect day at Cross World Dam Lake. While taking a virtual tour of a dam they are told is contaminated, they discover a radio signal coming from under the dam itself. Kaitlin discovers a mysterious plank, while J.B. and Ryan encounter Skugs. Ryan dives into the lake and finds a cave, but the door leading into it shuts when he gets close. Back at the newspaper, Kaitlin enlarges the photos and discovers crates labeled "dynamite". Contacting the Professor, the teens figure out Grimlord's plan. They return to the dam to defuse the bomb and are met by the skugs and Shoulderbot. Kaitlin and J.B. take on Shoulderbot, while Ryan finds the bomb, detaches its mooring and hurls it into the water.
30	"Small But Mighty"	Robert Hughes	Robert Hughes	November 9, 1994
Grimlord sends a package to the dojo. When it is opened, Ryan, Kaitlin and J.B. are exposed to a strange ray which turns them into children. The delivery man turns into a group of Skugs and the kids must battle them. The children are victorious and head for the lab. Once at the lab, they learn of a massive assault through the reality barrier. Professor Hart determines that they can still transform, but only for a short time, then they will return to child form. They become the V.R. Troopers and go into battle, defeating their enemies. When the trio regroups in the Skybase, they come under a final aerial assault. Just then, they retro-form back to children. As kids, they must fly the Skybase and defeat Grimlord's forces. Back at the lab, they have one final fling as kids before allowing Professor Hart to restore them to their proper age.
31	"Defending Darkheart"	John Grant Weil	Douglas Sloan	November 14, 1994 November 15, 1994
32	"Defending Darkheart"	John Grant Weil	Douglas Sloan	November 16, 1994
33 34	"Defending Darkheart"	John Grant Weil	Douglas Sloan	November 17, 1994
The Troopers and Professor Hart discover that one of Grimlord's mutants actually possesses human DNA. They learn that there is a hole in the Reality Barrier and that it is guarded by the mutant with the human DNA. Ryan volunteers to face this mutant, Dark Heart, and attempt to repair the hole. The two begin to fight and Percy, who has been all but forgotten, sees them and takes their pictures. Before Percy is able to leave the scene, however, he is captured by Skugs and thrown into Grimlord's Virtual Dungeon. Ryan wins the fight with Dark Heart, and the mutant begs to be destroyed. Ryan refuses to do this, because he suspects that this mutant is really his father, Tyler Steele, the only human known to be trapped in virtual reality. Dark Heart returns to Grimlord and is sentenced to a virtual termination. Meanwhile, J.B. and Kaitlin search for Percy and are sucked into the Virtual Dungeon. The chamber is lined in spikes and the walls are slowly coming together, threatening to crush the three kids. J.B., Kaitlin and Percy manage to escape being crushed by giant spikes in Grimlord's Virtual Dungeon. Dark Heart, about to be executed by Grimlord's mutants, uses TOXOID as a shield and escapes while Ryan fights Skugs. Ryan takes Dark Heart, who has been injured in his escape, to the lab for repairs. J.B. and Kaitlin join them and the three learn that Dark Heart is indeed Ryan's father. Dark Heart has been so thoroughly programmed and he cannot remember he was once Tyler Steele. The Professor transfers some of Ryan's childhood memories to Dark Heart/Tyler in an attempt to undo some brainwashing. It is successful, but Tyler decides to return to virtual reality. Until he can regain his humanity, he will remain just another one of Grimlord's mutants. Ryan goes after him and together they decide to face Grimlord. A Skug learns of the V.R. Troopers' plans to de-virtualize Ryan's father, Tyler Steele/Dark Heart and warns Grimlord, who decides to use Dark Heart as bait to lure Ryan to his destruction. Professor Hart and J.B. analyze the data and discover that Dark Heart is literally connected to Grimlord through a specific chemical and electronic link. The only way to break the link is to destroy Grimlord, who appears on the lab's screens and gives Ryan specific coordinates on the reality grid. There he will find his father. Grimlord threatens that if Ryan does not appear, Dark Heart will be destroyed. Ryan keeps his appointment and must fight several mutants who intend to destroy both him and his father. Dark Heart is shot and Ryan rescues him. The father and son escape on Ryan's Turbo Cycle, but Grimlord begins a full scale assault on the lab. Grimlord, knowing that Dark Heart/Tyler is gravely injured, launches a full aerial assault on Professor Hart's lab, as this is the first place Ryan will take his father. Ryan, warned that the lab is under attack, takes his father to a long forgotten and secret lab in the mountains. Father and son are about to be attacked by a full scale aerial assault when J.B. reinputs the transformation commands into the lab's computer. He and Kaitlin transform and rush to Ryan and Dark Heart/Tyler's aid. Ryan and Dark Heart/Tyler decide to challenge Grimlord face to face and enter virtual reality. Meanwhile, Grimlord begins a self-destruct system. Father and son escape just as Grimlord's dungeon explodes, supposedly with Grimlord inside, but most of the mutants were outside, and another battle begins. Ryan fights off Decimator and Tyler returns to human form. Ryan holds his father before he disappears, as Grimlord takes him back to Virtual World.
35	"Ghost Biker"	Worth Keeter	Mark Litton	November 18, 1994
The Troopers stumble onto Grimlord's secret weapons factory and are caught in a deadly fog which keeps them from transforming.
36	"Endangered Species"	Worth Keeter	Cheryl Saban	November 21, 1994
Kaitlin's friend, Danielle, begs her to write a story about the Animal Sanctuary, where Danielle's father is head scientist. Developers are trying to buy the land and use it for industrial development. When Kaitlin, J.B. and Ryan arrive at the sanctuary, they discover that Grimlord has plans for the land as well. Grimlord's Skugs kidnap Danielle while his mutants try to destroy the rare species of animals being protected on the sanctuary. The VR Troopers fight Grimlord's minions and save the animals. Kaitlin's story convinces the City Council to keep the animal sanctuary intact and safe for future generations.
37	"Field Goal"	Worth Keeter	J.K. Richards	November 22, 1994
When the Jr. High Football Coach stumbles onto Grimlord's secret base, Skugs shrink him and imprison him in a sports trading card. When the team is turned away from their field, the Troopers go to the office of the "landscaper", who turns into Skugs and a fight ensues. Ryan decides to hold practice at the Dojo, where the Troopers, including Jeb, help with the training. Grimlord is determined to ambush Ryan, but Ryan defeats Canon Fist, retrieving its memory cell. Ryan and Kaitlin work with the team while J.B. uses the lab's computers on the memory cell in hopes of finding the coach. He determines a link to the playing field. At the field J.B. battles Skugs and just as Kaitlin arrives, pulls them back to Virtual Reality, where they battle Foot-bot. In a parallel fight, Ryan leads the football team. J.B. and Kaitlin destroy Foot-bot, find the trading card and release the coach. They get him back to the game in time to give the team one final play and the victory.
38	"The Littlest Trooper"	Worth Keeter	Margo McCahon	November 23, 1994
Skugs kidnap Baby Boo from his parents in the park and leave the baby on the dojo doorstep. Jeb alerts the kids, who alert the authorities and care for the baby. At the lab, the V.R. Scanner shows the bomb factory and Baby Boo's Mom and Dad being held prisoner by Skugs. Then Percy shows up at the cave, gets pounced on by Skugs and is held hostage with baby's parents. Ryan stays in the lab with Jeb and Baby Boo. J.B. and Kaitlin fight Icebot until General Ivar's Quantum Cruisers begin to release bombs. Ryan leaves Baby Boo with Professor Hart and Jeb and transforms. Ryan fights the air battle in the V.R. Skybase. After J.B. and Kaitlin rescue the hostages, Ryan targets the bomb factory and destroys it. After the battle, Ryan hopes that he and his father will soon be reunited.
39	"The Reality Virus"	John Grant Weil	Mark Litton	November 29, 1994
General Ivar and Colonel Icebot stage a battle with the V.R. Troopers in virtual reality in order to infect them with a Reality Virus. The Troopers cross back to reality, unwittingly carrying a virtual sludge designed to eat away the reality barrier. By the time Ryan, Kaitlin and J.B. discover the virus, it already infected much of Cross World City and Grimlord is preparing a massive attack. The kids discover that one of Tao's plants will destroy the virus, but Skugs take the plant. As reality crumbles and Kaitlin and J.B. fight the Quantum Cruisers, Ryan must fight Renegade and Crabor in order to retrieve the rare plant that will allow Professor Hart to prepare specialized virtual bombs that will heal the reality barrier.
40	"Friends in Need"	John Grant Weil	J.T. Paul	November 30, 1994
Two circus performers who are scientists in disguise (Mikail and Leah) are taken to Professor Hart for help in completing their research on a fuel-increasing formula hidden on a micro-dot on a jewel in Leah's necklace. They are beset by Skugs on the way to the lab, and the scientists are kidnapped, but not before Leah puts her necklace around Jeb's neck. Grimlord is furious that the formula has been passed on. Professor Hart helps the Troopers in preparing a plan to find and free Leah and Mikail, while he analyzes the micro-dot. The Troopers transform. Ryan meets Horrorbot in a battle where his powers are weakened and he is caged. Following a high-speed pursuit, Kaitlin leads the scientists to safety while J.B. flattens Terminoid and General Ivar. Meanwhile, Ryan puts Horrorbot out of commission. Reunited at the Dojo, Leah gets her necklace back, along with Professor Hart's information.
41	"Good Trooper, Bad Trooper"	Worth Keeter	Winston Richard	February 6, 1995
Kaitlin is doing an article on biologically dissimilar twins. She maintains that every living being has a mirror image. Meanwhile, Ziktor has developed a cloning device from plans originally belonging to Tyler Steele. He sends his Skugs to attack Ryan and obtain a lock of his hair with which the device will produce a clone. While Ryan is out jogging with Jeb in the park, his evil Clone appears at the Dojo and becomes uncharacteristically aggressive and mean. When Ryan's Clone cannot gain entrance to the lab, J.B. and Kaitlin become suspicious. Ryan goes to the lab and is given the Professor's Virtualizer, enabling him to confront his evil twin. The Troopers win the day and return to the Dojo, intent on finding Jeb. Suddenly, Jeb shows up at the door, but it is not Jeb, but rather his twin. When Jeb's twin exhibits the same characteristics as Jeb, Kaitlin is quick to acknowledge that some twins are equal.
42	"The Transmutant"	Worth Keeter	Mark Litton	February 7, 1995
J.B. spars with Ryan in an effort to relax before taking a test to qualify for a scholarship. When sparring fails to work, J.B. tries to relax in the park. Skugs attacks him and draws him into the BattleGrid where they administer the Metamorphosis Pulse, a weapon designed to gradually change humans into virtual mutants. Professor Hart informs Kaitlin and Ryan that J.B. is under Grimlord's influence. As one of Grimlord's mutants, J.B. forgets who he really is and fights other mutants for position. Grimlord sends the mutant J.B. to fight Ryan, as Kaitlin works with the Professor to cure J.B.. Ryan manages to save J.B.'s life and, as the Transmutant, J.B. fights by Ryan's side and defeats the other mutants. At the lab, J.B. regains his human form just in time to take his exam, about which he is no longer worried because his experience in the Virtual World has allowed him to put the scholarship in proper perspective.
43	"Who's King of the Mountain?"	Worth Keeter	J.K. Richards	February 8, 1995
J.B. agrees to help his South American e-mail pal, Jose, with some research on volcano data. Mount Kronos, an extinct volcano near-by, has been vibrating strangely and J.B. is convinced that his computer will give him the answer to why this is happening. Meanwhile, Grimlord is building an attack base to breach the reality barrier through the volcano. By eavesdropping on J.B., Grimlord learns that the Troopers may uncover his plan. Jeb smells a rat and Ryan realizes Jose is an impostor. "Jose" turns into a Skug, multiplies himself and a Skug fight ensues. J.B. transforms, goes onto the mountain and is nearly trapped by General Ivar and Roll-Bot. Ryan pulls J.B. back to reality just in time. The Troopers defeat their enemies and destroy Grimlord's attack base. Back at the Dojo, "Jose", short for the beautiful Josephina, arrives. She wonders if J.B. would show her around Cross World City. J.B. is convinced that this experience is better in reality than via computer e-mail.
44	"The Couch Potato Kid"	John Grant Weil	Margo McCahon	February 9, 1995
Ricky, Tao's visiting nephew, is a couch potato who spends most of his time watching TV and playing video games. The kids are planning an obstacle course for Cross World City and they get Ricky involved. Grimlord, reeling from recent defeats at the hands of the V.R. Troopers, plans an obstacle course competition for his warriors. The prize is another bout with Ryan. Grimlord's newest robot, COMBAX, kidnaps Ricky and brings him to the games. Ryan finds Ricky and Combax at the robot games. Ryan defeats Combax and rescues Ricky, who no longer wants to be a couch potato. He wants to participate in life. To Tao's delight, Ricky not only runs the obstacle course, but he also soundly trounces Percy, despite his opponent's head start.
45	"The Old Switcharoo"	John Grant Weil	Al Winchell	February 10, 1995
Grimlord steals Dr. Unger's transforming device, hoping to take the powers of the V.R. Troopers for his army. Ryan interrupts the theft and the device's beam is turned on him. Jeb jumps into the beam and the two of them switch bodies. Later, J.B. and Kaitlin transform to get the device while Ryan, in Jeb's body, tries to control Jeb. J.B. and Kaitlin fight a fierce battle and when they need help, Ryan tries to transform while still in Jeb's body. Jeb winds up in Ryan's robot body and is forced to fight a mutant. When J.B. and Kaitlin destroy the device, Ryan and Jeb are switched back to their own bodies and Ryan defeats his foe. Back at the Dojo, the kids are surprised by one of the antics that Jeb pulled while a human: he bought out every fast food place in Cross World City.
46	"Race to the Rescue"	Worth Keeter	Robert Hughes	February 13, 1995
Ryan, Kaitlin and J.B. are having a blast at a go-cart racetrack. They notice a kid who is being teased by a bully about having trouble with his go-cart. J.B. and Ryan volunteer to help get the kid's go-cart up and running for a race against the bully. Meanwhile, Ziktor has come up with the ultimate opposition to the Troopers, in the form of melding the powers of all his mutants into one super-robot, Zelton. Back at the Dojo, Ryan and J.B. get a call from Professor Hart, who needs their help in collecting crystals for some research he is doing. Ryan is busy with the repair job on the go-cart, so Kaitlin and J.B. volunteer to collect the Professor's crystals. Grimlord orders his mutants to fire upon the two Troopers after they enter an old mine. Once inside, the bombardment causes a cave-in in the mine, traping Kaitlin and J.B. At the lab, Ryan and the Professor try to trace J.B. and Kaitlin's movements, but they are unsuccessful. Grimlord chooses a perfect time to unleash his ultimate robot. If Ryan will not come to meet this 'Bot in battle, it will be unleashed upon Cross World City. Ryan defeats his opponent and forces Zelton to tell him the coordinates of J.B. and Kaitlin's location. Zelton then self-destructs. Ryan calls for his V.R. Battle Cruiser and races to the site of the mine. With super human strength, he lifts the fallen beams off his friends. Back at the race track, Ryan has the go-cart ready on the day of the big race and little friend defeats the bully in the big race.
47	"Fiddler on the Loose"	Robert Hughes	Douglas Sloan	February 14, 1995
Kaitlin's cousin from Ireland, Keith, and his band are in town to perform a benefit concert to help raise awareness concerning the environment. Karl Ziktor/Grimlord, not wanting the city to realize his company is responsible for harmful toxic waste dumping, needs to prevent the concert at any cost. Therefore, he kidnaps Keith and brings him into his world of Virtual Reality. For good measure, Grimlord decides to imprison Keith in a music synthesizer that will harness the musician's fiddling talent and enable the mutant Fiddlebot to play a series of songs that will finally destroy the Troopers. Ryan rescues Keith from Grimlord's clutches and returns him to human form so the concert can go on. Professor Hart and the Troopers erase all of Keith's memories of Virtual Reality and he and his band entertain and enlighten the citizens of Cross World City as planned.
48	"Virtually Powerless"	Robert Hughes	Stewart St. John	February 15, 1995
While at an arcade, J.B., Ryan and Kaitlin are visited by a mysterious man who suggests they play the newest game in the store: "Dark Odyssey". As they play, they are given a shock via the game board, which Grimlord is secretly using as a conduit to unleash a lethal dose of gamma radiation on the virtualizers. They turn to their old friend, Dr. Ulysses T. Poindexter, the absent-minded professor. With Dr. Poindexter's help, Ryan's virtualizer is repaired. During a test run, Poindexter is kidnapped by Skugs under Grimlord's order. The evil emperor wants to use Poindexter's knowledge of the Troopers as a weapon against them. The VR trio track Poindexter's whereabouts and Ryan sets out to rescue him. In the end, Poindexter repairs all three virtualizers and the Troopers are back in business. J.B. uses a device to wipe Poindexter's memory free from knowing who they really are, thus making him worthless to Grimlord.
49	"New Kids on the Planet"	Robert Hughes	Robert Hughes	February 20, 1995
Ryan, Kaitlin and J.B. are camping in the wilderness when a streak of light and a thunderous crash nearby alert them to the arrival of an alien spaceship. They meet two twelve year-old aliens from another planet whose craft was forced to crash land due to technical problems and the Troopers pledge to help get them back on their way. Grimlord learns of the arrival of the alien children and he wants to harness their powers for his evil purposes. Grimlord sends his Skugs to abduct the aliens, but they are defeated by the Troopers. Professor Hart succeeds in repairing the spacecraft and the children are on their way, leaving a message of peace for the planet.
50	"Message From Space"	Robert Hughes	Margo McCahon	February 22, 1995
Professor Hart contacts Ryan, Kaitlin and J.B. at The Underground to relay a message to Ryan from Dr. Monroe, an old friend of the Professor's who happens to head up the National Space Laboratory. Dr. Monroe informs Ryan that while retrieving data from an old satellite he ran across information concerning Tyler Steele, Ryan's dad. Dr. Monroe arranges to travel to Cross World City to give Ryan the video. Ziktor/Grimlord learns of this plan and sends his Skugs to intercept delivery of the videotape. He also plans to lure the Troopers into a trap that will destroy them once and for all. Grimlord's Skugs are successful in kidnapping Dr. Monroe and detaining the Troopers, who locate the real Dr. Monroe and attempt a rescue. Dr. Monroe is released from Grimlord's clutches and the video of Tyler Steele is recovered. Ryan learns that his father is still alive and out there somewhere.
51	"The Rise of the Red Python"	Douglas Sloan	Douglas Sloan	February 27, 1995
52	"The Rise of the Red Python"	Douglas Sloan	Douglas Sloan	February 28, 1995
J.B. and Ryan rescue a stray kitten and take it to an animal shelter where they meet Amy, a nice young girl with an interest in martial arts. Ryan offers to show her some basics. Meanwhile Grimlord is pleased with Colonel Icebot's latest creation and the ultimate Virtual Warrior: an evil VR Trooper called the Red Python. They choose Amy in order to use the Red Python's powers. They capture and brainwash her, making her obey Grimlord's every command. Her new friends do not understand Amy's weird behavior. The VR Troopers are deployed to battle the Red Python, not knowing it is Amy. Kaitlin is seriously injured, and her retroformer is damaged so she is unable to change back to normal. With one Trooper out of the way, Grimlord's evil plan is coming to fruition. J.B. is sent to fight the Red Python, which malfunctions mid-battle. Dr. Poindexter has an extra retroformer which they use to bring Kaitlin back to normal. Meanwhile, Amy goes to the dojo for help and passes out. She transforms into the Red Python and is sent to destroy the Troopers. At the lab it is discovered that Amy is the Red Python and in danger of self-destructing if engaged in another battle. J.B. meets again with the Red Python who collapses and changes back to Amy. She is taken to the lab where the professor reverses the brainwashing. She is grateful to the VR Troopers and her new friends, unaware they are the same.

=== Season 2 (1995–96) ===
No.	Title	Directed by	Written by	Original release date
53	"Mutant Mutiny"	John Grant Weil	Michael Ryan	September 11, 1995
Amphibidor's mutiny against Grimlord to become master of Virtual Reality is redirected into an attack on the VR Troopers.
54	"Trooper Out of Time"	John Grant Weil	Mark Litton	September 12, 1995
Ziktor tries to destroy Ryan's past with a time machine.
55	"Secret Power"	John Grant Weil	Margo McCahon	September 13, 1995
The Troopers show how to combat stage fright and stop a plot to steal energy from the Power Plant at the same time.
56	"Quest For Power"	Worth Keeter	Douglas Sloan	September 18, 1995 September 19, 1995 September 20, 1995
57	"Quest For Power"	Worth Keeter	Douglas Sloan	September 21, 1995
58 59 60	"Quest For Power"	Worth Keeter	Douglas Sloan	September 22, 1995
The Troopers attempt to rescue Tyler from Grimlord's dungeon and stop the evil warlord's plan to steal all of his knowledge. The Troopers are forced to infiltrate Grimlord's dungeon in their efforts to rescue Tyler. Ryan loses his VR powers as he tries to rescue his father and the other Troopers. Tyler attempts to create a new virtual armor for Ryan. Tyler's new technology is put to the test when Grimlord has a new mutant created to destroy the Troopers.
61	"Fashion Victims"	Vickie Bronaugh	Clifford Herbert	September 25, 1995
Ziktor uses a fashion show as an opportunity to try to catch the Troopers in his silk "capture" cocoons.
62	"Game Over"	Vickie Bronaugh	Diane Mathers	September 26, 1995
Grimlord launches the Troopers' new video training game into a real battleground and forces the Troopers to face their most awesome opponent ever.
63	"Watered Down"	Vickie Bronaugh	Al Winchell	September 27, 1995
Ryan is trapped underwater by Octobot and is unable to use his powers to save himself.
64	"The Negative Factor"	Vickie Bronaugh	Stewart St. John	October 2, 1995
Ryan rushes to try to save J.B. and Kaitlin who are headed for the Negative Zone after being zapped by the Doom Master into phantoms on Earth.
65	"Kaitlin Through the Looking Glass"	Worth Keeter	David Avallone	October 3, 1995
66	"Kaitlin Through the Looking Glass"	Worth Keeter	David Avallone	October 4, 1995
Grimlord steals Kaitlin's image to create an Anti-Kaitlin programmed to destroy the VR Troopers. Grimlord's creation, the Anti-Kaitlin, turns against him, and steals his Virtual Mirror Program to help reunite the two Kaitlins.
67	"Kaitlin Goes Hollywood"	Worth Keeter	Margo McCahon	October 9, 1995
Kaitlin is forced to choose between the VR Troopers and a movie career as Grimlord creates Photobot to destroy them.
68	"Grimlord Takes Root"	Worth Keeter	Michael Ryan	October 10, 1995
Grimlord's killer plants come alive and destroy the Troopers' motorcycles as they plan on taking over the Earth.
69	"The Disk"	Vickie Bronaugh	Mark Litton	October 11, 1995
Grimlord tries to steal new scientific computer programs which threaten the Troopers' powers.
70	"Virtual Venom"	Vickie Bronaugh	Stewart St. John	October 16, 1995
J.B. and Kaitlin face old age before their time after Doom Master's Virtual Spider bites them.
71	"New World Order"	Vickie Bronaugh	Peter Meech	October 17, 1995
Ryan falls victim to a mind-control motorcycle helmet and threatens Kaitlin's safety.
72	"Grimlord's Children"	Vickie Bronaugh	Margo McCahon	October 18, 1995
Grimlord attempts to enslave Ryan, Kaitlin and the play center kids with his magic balloons.
73	"The Millennium Sabre"	Al Winchell	Judd Lynn	October 24, 1995
The Troopers race to block Lizardbot's plan to destroy them using the stolen energized Millennium Sabre.
74	"Grimlord's Dark Secret"	Al Winchell	Michael Ryan	November 2, 1995
75	"Grimlord's Dark Secret"	Al Winchell	Michael Ryan	November 3, 1995
Ancient digs unearth a portal to worlds unknown, except by Grimlord. A pyramid in another time hides deadly secrets for the Troopers.
76	"On the Wrong Track"	Al Winchell	Danielle Weinstock	November 6, 1995
Grimlord sabotages athlete's gold medals in World Games with plans for global domination.
77	"Forward Into the Past"	Vickie Bronaugh	Stewart St. John	November 7, 1995
Grimlord tries to banish all to prehistoric Earth using his magic time bracelets.
78	"Into Oraclon's Web"	Vickie Bronaugh	Clifford Herbert	November 8, 1995
Ryan unknowingly falls for Alexis, a beautiful mutant, who tricks him into a trap.
79	"Santa's Secret Trooper"	Vickie Bronaugh	Margo McCahon	November 13, 1995
Otto, one of Santa's elves, rescues the Troopers in time for Christmas.
80	"The Charmeeka Invasion"	Vickie Bronaugh	Judd Lynn	November 14, 1995
A new type of pet transforms themselves into an invasion of monsters which threaten the whole town.
81	"Dream Battle"	Al Winchell	Mark Litton	November 15, 1995
Grimlord traps the Troopers in a dream of his own making.
82	"A Hard Day's Mutant"	Al Winchell	David Avallone	November 20, 1995
Grimlord attempts to steal the musical talents of a popular young rock group.
83	"Magnetic Attraction"	Al Winchell	Michael Ryan	November 21, 1995
Oraclon creates a powerful magnet monster to destroy the VR Troopers.
84	"Get Me to the Lab on Time"	Al Winchell	Diane Mathers	November 27, 1995
Grimlord creates a powerful love potion for Kaitlin and Percy who plan their wedding.
85	"Grimlord's Big Breakout"	Vickie Bronaugh	Eric Mofford	November 28, 1995
Grimlord frees an evil convict and transforms him into an anti-Trooper weapon.
86	"Field and Scream"	Vickie Bronaugh	Worth Keeter	February 5, 1996
Knighttime launches a city attack while the Troopers and Ziktor are on a nature trip.
87	"The Duplitron Dilemma"	Vickie Bronaugh	Judd Lynn	February 6, 1996
Grimlord's Duplitron machine multiplies trouble for the Troopers.
88	"Despera Strikes Back"	Vickie Bronaugh	Michael Ryan	February 7, 1996
Despera sends her evil sister, Desponda, to be the secret weapon in Grimlord's plot to destroy the Troopers.
89	"The Ghost of Cross World Forest"	Al Winchell	Margo McCahon	February 12, 1996
The Troopers stumble onto Grimlord's secret weapons factory and are caught in a deadly fog which keeps them from transforming.
90	"Grimlord's Dummy"	Al Winchell	Michael Ryan	February 13, 1996
Grimlord transforms a ventriloquist dummy into a life-size monster who attacks the Troopers.
91	"Time Out"	Al Winchell	David Avallone	February 20, 1996
The Troopers and Grimlord are forced to join forces against Knighttime who has stopped the Earth.
92	"Galileo's New Memory"	Al Winchell	Judd Lynn	February 21, 1996
The Troopers have to rescue a new robot from Grimlord who wants to steal its memory.
