= List of Kamen Rider: Dragon Knight episodes =

The following is a list of episodes for the television series Kamen Rider: Dragon Knight. Some episodes (due to premiere in August 2009 in North America) were aired a month early on Brazilian channel Rede Globo program TV Globinho. Televisa in Mexico finished the series a month before The CW4Kids did, due to it airing three times a week there.

== Episodes ==
No.	Title	Directed by	Written by	Original release date
1	"Search for the Dragon"	Steve Wang	Nathan Long	December 13, 2008
Prompted by visions of his missing father, Kit Taylor, who has just turned eighteen, returns home and finds an Advent Deck in his apartment. Another vision leads him to a confrontation with a mysterious Dragon. While searching the city for clues, Kit witnesses the mirror monsters attempting to kidnap a young woman and tries to protect her but fails. She is rescued by Len (Kamen Rider Wing Knight) who, after defeating the monsters, demands Kit give him the Advent Deck. Escaping from Len, Kit is attacked and falls through a mirror into Ventara and finds himself in a strange suit of armor. Len follows and destroys the mirror monster before the two are attacked by the Dragon Kit saw earlier.: Note: This Episode's original airdate of December 13, 2008 in the United States was a "special preview". The Episode re-aired on January 3, 2009 in the United States for the official start of the series.
2	"Contract with the Dragon"	Steve Wang	Colin Gillis	January 10, 2009
Escaping the Dragon, Kit and Len get separated. Later, Len finds Kit and again demands he give him the Advent Deck. Sensing a portal opening, Kit and Len race to the rescue of an innocent man. Len transforms and enters Ventara to fight the monster. Kit attempts to transform but can't until a vision of his father instructs him to use the Contract Card. The Dragon appears again and Kit contracts with it, becoming Kamen Rider Dragon Knight. Kit saves Len and uses his Final Vent to destroy the monster. Maya Young, the girl Len saved, tracks Kit down and offers to help him find his father. Kit senses a portal opening and enters Ventara to fight a mirror monster but is attacked by another Kamen Rider.
3	"Kamen Rider Incisor"	Steve Wang	Scott Phillips	January 17, 2009
Kit battles Kamen Rider Incisor who turns out to be Richie Preston, a spoiled rich kid who was kicked out of his home for his lack of responsibility and is recruited by Xaviax under the guise of attorney Walter Connors, who promises to pay him for venting Wing Knight. Len arrives and watches as Kit is forced to retreat. Kit goes to Grace's Bookstore to talk to Maya who reveals to him that his father's disappearance may be connected to the mirror monsters. After leaving, Kit is stalked by Incisor who calls him into battle. The two fight until Len shows up which causes Richie to leave, believing two-on-one to be unfair. Len decides to train Kit and then defeats him in a training session.
4	"A Rider's Challenge"	Steve Wang	Scott Phillips	January 24, 2009
Following their training session, Len tells Kit the story behind the Kamen Riders and that including him, there are 12 riders. The two then fight a mirror monster and defeat it. The next day, Richie's motorcycle is repossessed, Kit tries to learn more about his Advent Cards and Len is out on patrol when they hear a portal open. Maya, who has become the assistant of reporter Michelle Walsh, witnesses Len transform and fight a mirror monster during an interview. After Kit arrives, Len spots Richie whom he identifies as Kamen Rider Incisor. Len challenges Richie to a one-on-one fight and vents him. Kit returns home and doubts if he wants to remain a Kamen Rider. After leaving to fight a mirror monster, another Rider with an Ox Advent Deck appears on a motorcycle.
5	"The Power of Two"	Michael Wang	Nathan Long	January 31, 2009
As Kit battles with a mirror monster, he is observed by Drew Lansing, a Kamen Rider who works for Xaviax. Maya tells her best friends, Trent and Lacey, about the Kamen Riders. Xaviax reveals his plan to kidnap every human on Earth and use them to rebuild his home planet. Kit tells Maya about Incisor being vented by Len, who arrives at the bookstore looking for Kit. Kit tells Len he doesn't want to be a Kamen Rider anymore. However, Len explains to Kit that he can't quit because of his link with his Advent Beast. Following a battle, Len tells Kit that it was Xaviax who stole Ventara with help from a Kamen Rider turned traitor. Kit decides to join Len and help him stop Xaviax from taking Earth as well.
6	"Kamen Rider Torque"	Michael Wang	Colin Gillis	February 7, 2009
At Kit's apartment, Len explains that the traitor of Ventara was the original Kamen Rider Dragon Knight. Kit and Len then enter Ventara and get separated fighting more mirror monsters. Kit defeats the monster he is facing and is attacked by Kamen Rider Torque. Kit asks him why he's not helping Wing Knight fight against Xaviax. Drew then tells Kit that Len is lying and that it was Wing Knight who stole the Advent Decks and betrayed Ventara. Kit doesn't believe him until Torque faces Wing Knight with Xaviax appearing to help trick Kit. After being contacted by JTC with information about the missing people, Maya and Trent sneak into the hospital and end up finding Kit's father.
7	"Friend or Foe"	Michael Wang	Colin Gillis	February 14, 2009
While Kit and Drew are talking, Maya appears and tells Kit that she and Trent found his father. Len deals with his anger about Kit being tricked by fighting a pair of monsters without transforming. Maya takes Kit and Drew to the hospital where Kit is reunited with his father. Drew explains that Xaviax drained Kit's father of his life energy and that there is a cure. After fighting mirror monsters with Len, Kit confronts him about what happened to his father. Len explains that there is no cure but Kit still doesn't trust him. Len confronts Drew and they battle with Torque using his Final Vent on Wing Knight. Drew goes to Kit's apartment and Kit decides to join him fight against Xaviax and Wing Knight.
8	"Kamen Rider Camo"	John Fasano	Scott Phillips	February 21, 2009
Len has barely survived his fight with Torque. Xaviax recruits underground martial artist Grant Staley to become Kamen Rider Camo. While Kit and Drew fight one of Xaviax's monsters, Maya is again contacted by JTC, who wants to meet her. She is then abducted by a mirror monster but is rescued by Len while Grant observes him. Kit and Drew arrive to fight Wing Knight, but end up fighting Camo instead, who later manages to escape. Xaviax then orders Kamen Rider Strike to send in Thrust. Len finds Maya and explains to her about everything Xaviax taking over Ventara. She also believes him when he tells her that Kit is being tricked by Drew. The two are then attacked by the new Kamen Rider.
9	"Kamen Rider Thrust"	John Fasano	Nathan Long	February 28, 2009
After returning Maya to Earth, Len faces off against Kamen Rider Thrust, who believes he is in a tournament called Battle Club. Back at Kit's apartment, Drew yells at Kit for letting Camo escape and decides to go look for Wing Knight. Maya calls and warns Kit that Drew is the one working for Xaviax. Meanwhile, Grant watches as Wing Knight and Thrust continue to fight. Kit and Drew arrive and are again confronted by Grant who Kit realizes he has been tricked by Xaviax as well. Drew and Grant then transform and fight. While trying to reason with Camo, Kit figures out Drew is working for Xaviax. Torque vents Camo and then attempts to vent Kit who is saved by Len.
10	"Battle Club"	John Fasano	Jeff Walker	March 7, 2009
Thrust is revealed to be Brad Barrett, a motocross rider who is blackmailed by Xaviax into entering Battle Club in exchange for the proof he needs to clear his name for a cheating scandal he didn't commit. Kit and Maya help Len back to Kit's apartment, where he reveals that the Earth and Ventara Riders are all twins after showing them a picture of himself and Adam, the original Dragon Knight. Kit fights a mirror monster and comes across Thrust in the process. Maya returns to the bookstore and JTC shows up for their meeting. Kit visits his father in the hospital but has to leave and helps Thrust fight a mirror monster. After destroying it, Thrust attacks Kit looking for answers. JTC leaves the bookstore and is revealed to be Kamen Rider Strike.
11	"Vent or Be Vented"	Mark Allen	Jeff Walker	March 14, 2009
Kit tells Brad the truth about everything that's been going on. Drew introduces himself to Brad and tries to convince him to help vent Wing Knight and Xaviax so they can both get their lives back. Brad confronts Xaviax who tells him the only way to get his life back is to vent Wing Knight. Michelle Walsh becomes suspicious of Maya, who tries to find the Kamen Rider who has been saving people in Gramercy Heights and does. Kit arrives to help the new Rider against a mirror monster. Brad goes after Len, believing he has no choice but to do what Xaviax says, and they begin to fight. After the mirror monster is vented, the new Rider attempts to arrest Kit believing him to be an alien trying to take over Earth.
12	"Kamen Rider Sting"	Mark Allen	Scott Phillips	March 21, 2009
Chris Ramirez, Kamen Rider Sting, is a marine who is medically discharged due to his asthma and offered a job to help protect the citizens of Earth. Kit tries to explain to him that he isn't an alien when they see Wing Knight and Thrust. Len has a chance to vent Brad but can't and lets him escape. He then fights with Chris whom they don't give a choice but to listen. Xaviax confronts Drew on his betrayal and sends Kamen Rider Strike after him but Drew manages to temporarily elude him. Kit and Len try to explain things to Chris who escapes when Maya shows up. Len finds him and has no choice but to fight when Chris refuses to listen. He has a chance to vent Chris as well but doesn't and leaves.
13	"Thrill of the Hunt"	Steve Wang	Jeff Walker	March 28, 2009
Len begins to doubt himself after being unable to vent Thrust and Sting. Chris begins to wonder who is telling him the truth and who isn't following his battle with Wing Knight. After Kit saves a woman and vents a mirror monster, Drew approaches him looking for help but Kit refuses and the two fight. Chris shows up and talks to Maya who tries to get him to help. Kit gains the upper hand and forces Drew to retreat. Len and Brad face off again. Drew's backstory is finally revealed including how he met Xaviax and became a Kamen Rider. Kit returns from Ventara and teams up with Chris to defeat a mirror monster. They then head off to help Len while JTC catches up with Drew.
14	"Xaviax's Promise"	Steve Wang	Colin Gillis	April 4, 2009
Torque and Strike begin their battle while Wing Knight and Thrust begin theirs at the same time. Kit and Chris arrive to back up Len. As the two battles converge, Drew sees an opportunity to vent everybody and nearly does so with his Final Vent before leaving. Thrust attacks Strike for using him as a human shield but is overpowered and vented. Kit and Len explain to Chris what happened to Thrust before they all head to Kit's apartment. Michelle Walsh gets Maya fired from her internet reporting job for reportedly faking evidence. Kit calls Maya, tells her about Thrust and invites her over to help fill Chris in on everything. Len senses that Torque has been vented and Chris says he's ready to listen.
15	"The Many Faces of Xaviax"	Steve Wang	Scott Phillips	April 11, 2009
Kit, Len and Maya begin to share their experiences up to this point with Chris. They tell him who Xaviax is, who the Kamen Riders are and about the friends and enemies they have made along the way. They also explain their back stories including the back stories of the vented Riders. Chris then asks why he was chosen to be a Kamen Rider considering he has asthma. Len explains that Xaviax didn't have a choice because the Earth and Ventara Riders are all twins including Chris, whose twin on Ventara was vented. Chris agrees that Xaviax must be stopped but leaves after having an asthma attack claiming he can't help them because he can't help himself. Maya leaves to go and talk to him.
16	"The Hero of Gramercy Heights"	Steve Wang	Nathan Long	August 1, 2009
Xaviax orders JTC to separate Sting from Kit and Len while he finds more reinforcements. Believing that JTC knows too much for a civilian, Len decides he wants to meet him. Kit and Len go to the book store and ask Trent to help them find JTC. Chris tells Maya about his early days as Kamen Rider Sting before they are confronted by Kamen Rider Strike. Chris tells Maya to run before transforming and entering Ventara with Strike to do battle. Kit and Len arrive at the address given to them and are ambushed by a robot. They fight it for a little while but it eventually escapes into the mirrors. Len is now more suspicious of JTC and the two leave the warehouse to find him.
17	"The Power of Three"	John Fasano	Scott Phillips	August 8, 2009
Sting fights with Strike but needs to be rescued by Kit and Len. Chris considers quitting but reconsiders after a lesson in teamwork by Len. Len decides they need to go speak to Maya about JTC. Michelle Walsh shows up still trying to get information out of Maya. Kit visits his father while Chris gets a letter from his doctor saying that his condition is getting worse. Xaviax recruits the Cho Brothers to be his new Kamen Riders. JTC meets with Maya and agrees to meet the others. Following a training session, the Riders go to meet JTC and watch as he is abducted. After transforming and splitting up, Chris again fights Strike and has to be rescued by Kit and Len. Xaviax introduces JTC to Axe and Spear.
18	"The Brothers Cho"	John Fasano	Scott Phillips	August 15, 2009
Len tells Kit he wants him to become the true Kamen Rider Dragon Knight, which means he would have to leave his life behind and go into suspended animation only to wake up every twelve years when needed. Kit says he needs time to think and Len tells him to take all the time he needs. Lacey tells Maya she needs to stop obsessing over the Kamen Riders, still not believing in them herself. The Cho Brothers attack Len who takes their Advent Decks and defeats them easily. Kit runs into Chris and they then go up against a mirror monster with Chris trying to prove to himself he can fight, refusing Kit's help. Kit goes back to the hospital, finds that his father is missing and that Strike took him.
19	"Semper Fi"	John Fasano	Colin Gillis	August 22, 2009
While Chris is writing in his journal, JTC appears and offers him a cure for his asthma if he betrays Wing Knight. Chris refuses and the two fight for the third time. Sting nearly gets vented but he manages to escape on his Advent Beast. Kit arrives at the bookstore and tells everyone about his fathers abduction when The Cho Brothers show up looking for a fight. Kit, Len, Chris and Danny enter Ventara while Albert transforms in the bookstore proving to Trent and Lacey that the Kamen Riders exist. Kit takes on Axe while Chris and Len take on Spear, his Advent Beasts and mirror monsters. Kit has a chance to vent Axe but does not. Strike arrives and tries to vent Len but Chris takes the hit and is vented instead.
20	"Letter from the Front Line"	Michael Wang	Nathan Long	August 29, 2009
Returning from Ventara, Kit and Len break the news about Chris being vented. At home, Kit goes through Chris' bag, finds and reads a letter he wrote to his father. Len feels guilty about Chris and considers quitting but realizes he can't following a battle with mirror monsters. Xaviax orders the Cho Brothers to watch Kit but they confront him. After teasing Kit about his dad and making insults about Chris, the three fight but Kit is easily overpowered. Kit returns to the bookstore as JTC calls with the location of his father. Maya decides to go with Kit to help him get his father back. Meanwhile, Michelle Walsh tricks Lacey into helping her gain the information Maya has on the Kamen Riders.
21	"Strike's Ultimatum"	Michael Wang	Scott Phillips	September 4, 2009
After JTC's call, Kit and Maya go to find his father. Lacey goes to the bookstore and copies information from Maya's computer. Len shows up and finds out where Kit and Maya went. Kit and Maya find Kit's dad with JTC who makes Kit an offer: his dad for Wing Knight's Advent Deck. When Kit refuses, the Cho Brothers show up and the battle begins. During the battle, Maya manages to escape with Kit's dad. Len arrives and fights two mirror monsters. Kit manages to fight off Strike and Axe before he vents Spear. Lacey delivers Maya's computer information to Michelle while Kit goes to the hospital to see his father. A new female Kamen Rider appears and prepares to fight Xaviax's soldiers.: Note: Episode's original airdate of September 4, 2009 in the United States was at a special day and time during the CW Daytime block. 4kids was granted one such special on a yearly basis.
22	"A Rider's Resolve"	Michael Wang	Nathan Long	September 5, 2009
The female Rider manages to destroy Xaviax's soldiers. Danny vows to destroy Dragon Knight for venting his brother. Xaviax uses his powers to threaten Danny and make sure that he does not. Kit meets with Len who explains that he's not a real leader. Kit disagrees explaining to Len he is a good leader before the two leave to fight more of Xaviax's creatures. Kit enters Ventara ahead of Len and is attacked by Axe who nearly vents him until the female Rider appears. Axe fights her but has to escape when he is overpowered. She then attacks Kit, thinking he also works for Xaviax. Len arrives to protect him and is surprised to discover the female Rider is his friend, Kase, an original Kamen Rider from Ventara.
23	"Kamen Rider Siren"	Steve Wang	Nathan Long	September 12, 2009
Danny tells Xaviax about Kamen Rider Siren, who Xaviax thought he destroyed. Becoming suspicious of Danny, he orders JTC to vent him. Kase tells Len about how she survived before being introduced to Kit. Kase challenges him to a fight, to see if he has what it takes to be a real Kamen Rider, and Kit loses. Lacey tries to get a job at the bookstore to keep an eye on Maya. Michelle Walsh, revealed to be a Government Agent, delivers Maya's information to her boss who orders her to bring Kit in. JTC confronts Danny about disobeying Xaviax and nearly vents him before deciding to give him one last chance. At home, Kit continues to feel frustrated and is then attacked by Kamen Rider Onyx.
24	"Dark Temptation"	Steve Wang	Nathan Long	September 19, 2009
Kit loses his fight with Onyx but it turns out to be a nightmare. Michelle introduces herself to Kit, calling him Dragon Knight, while JTC tells Xaviax he didn't vent Axe. Len remembers being a Ventara Rider with Kase. Lacey pretends to be intellectual to stay close to Maya. Kit arrives and tells Maya about his encounter with Michelle and she discovers her computer information was copied. Len and Kase fight mirror monsters and defeat them. Kit shows up feeling Len doesn't need his help anymore. Len tells him to come back when he sorts things out. At the hospital, Kit meets Xaviax who briefly wakes his father and uses him as an incentive for Kit to vent Wing Knight, which Kit seems to consider.
25	"Dropping the Axe"	Steve Wang	Jeff Walker	September 26, 2009
Kit attacks and vents Len turning into Onyx in the process. He then attacks Siren but it turns out to be another nightmare. Trent tells Maya to delete her computer information which she does. At the park, Kit is confused about what to do and remembers a conversation with his father which helps him. Danny attacks Kit form behind and they fall into Ventara. As they fight, Len and Kase arrive but want Kit to win on his own. Strike appears and prepares to vent Dragon Knight but vents Axe instead. Lacey reveals to Maya and Trent she stole Maya's computer information. Kit tells Len and Kase about his encounter with Xaviax and says he's ready to be a real Rider. Xaviax introduces JTC to Kamen Rider Wrath.
26	"Kamen Rider Wrath"	John Fasano	Colin Gillis	October 3, 2009
The secret agents continue to watch Kit's apartment and the bookstore. Kase apologizes to Kit who then leaves to visit his father and is followed. Both Maya and Trent feel betrayed by Lacey but forgive her before Maya realizes she must warn Kit. Xaviax uses his powers to enter Wrath's body so he can use his armor. Lacey disguises Maya so that she can leave to warn the others. After talking with his father Kit is kidnapped by two agents. Wrath and Strike hold Trent and Lacey hostage in the bookstore. Maya arrives at the hospital but doesn't find Kit. Len and Kase go to the bookstore and fight Wrath and Strike but have to retreat. Kit is taken to a secret government facility and thrown in a cell.
27	"Attack of the No-Men"	John Fasano	Colin Gillis	October 10, 2009
Maya returns to the bookstore, is shocked by the damage done and then confronted by Michelle who tells her not to interfere anymore. After Trent and Lacey return, Maya explains to them about Kit being captured and asks for Trent's help in finding him. Trent then calls two of his friends to help hack the No-Men's Database and find out where Kit is being held. Kit is released from his cell to fight a mirror monster so the No-Men can see his armor and skills but is recaptured after the battle. While out looking for Kit, Len is confronted by Xaviax in Wrath's body while Kase goes up against Strike. Both manage to escape them and meet back at Kit's apartment. Kit awakens to find himself back in the jail cell.
28	"A Dragon Caged"	John Fasano	Jeff Walker	October 17, 2009
Trent and his friends hack the No-Men's Database obtaining Kit's location and Maya goes to find him. Michelle begins to question Kit about the Kamen Riders, Xaviax and Ventara. Trent and Lacey later find Len and Kase letting them know where Kit is. Maya arrives at the No-Men's Headquarters while Xaviax and JTC begin looking for Kit themselves. After Len and Kase arrive, Kit manages to escape using a cup of water he spills on the floor. While Kit fights a mirror monster, Len, Kase and Maya try to escape the No-Men themselves and succeed. Xaviax and JTC then attack Kit, injuring his leg, before Len and Kase arrive to save him. At night they all meet in the bookstore while Kase heals Kit injured leg.
29	"Calm Before the Storm"	John Fasano	Scott Philips	October 24, 2009
While Kase heals Kit's leg, everyone starts to recount their current experiences. Len still feels guilty for what happened to Chris but Kase explains it wasn't his fault. Kit recalls Chris being vented as well, along with venting Kamen Rider Spear, meeting Xaviax, speaking with his father and his nightmares about Onyx, which he doesn't elaborate on. Maya and Lacey talk about Michelle and how she deceived them since the beginning while trying to figure out what was going on. Len tells everyone things will only get worse especially with Xaviax using Wrath but believes they can win. After they say the Riders' motto, Michelle and the agents show up forcing them to escape through a mirror into Ventara.
30	"Swan Song"	Michael Wang	Nathan Long	October 31, 2009
Following their escape, Kase gives Len and Kit their Survive Mode cards. JTC attacks Len, stealing the Thrust and Sting decks before escaping. After the Riders follow him, Michelle shows up with the agents and kidnaps Maya, Trent and Lacey. Kit goes after and fights Strike while Len and Kase fight Xaviax/Wrath. When Strike gains the upper hand on Kit, nearly venting him, Len shows up and saves him. Strike reveals he can now capture other Advent Beasts and use them as his own. Kase escapes from Xaviax, who goes after Len and Kit. Kase arrives in time to help but during the battle is vented by Strike who escapes with Xaviax. Len picks up Kase's deck, holds his Survive Mode card and goes after Strike.
31	"Xaviax's Wrath"	Michael Wang	Nathan Long	November 7, 2009
Kit finds Strike and fights him until Len arrives and uses his Survive Mode card. Xaviax attacks Kit but then leaves to go help Strike. Kit finds them before Xaviax and watches as Len uses his Survive Mode Final Vent to vent Strike. Xaviax appears and Kit uses his Survive Mode to help against Xaviax, who proves too powerful forcing them to retreat. Kit and Len come up with a plan to vent Xaviax but Kit's Survive Mode wears off. He tries using his Final Vent but misses, is hit with Wrath's Final Vent and is vented. Wrath is also vented but Xaviax survives, claims Kit's deck and escapes. Michelle arrives with Trent, Maya and Lacey, then shows Len a picture that makes him believe they can still win the war.
32	"Advent Master Returns"	Michael Wang	Nathan Long	November 14, 2009
Xaviax has his minions begin planting teleportation beacons around the world. At the No-Men's Headquarters Len uses his advent deck to awaken the Advent Master, Eubulon. It's revealed that he came to Earth 60 Years prior to warn them of Xaviax but was injured and placed in a cryogenic sleep. Meanwhile, Xaviax recruits Adam from the illusion of Ventara he is in with Sarah, his girlfriend, to once again become Dragon Knight. While Trent becomes a No-Men to help locate Xaviax's transmitters and beacons, Eubulon makes Maya the new Kamen Rider Siren. Maya destroys one beacon as Xaviax watches with Adam who he orders to get close to Len and Maya. After Len destroys a beacon, he is helped by Adam.
33	"Out of the Void"	Mark Allen	Scott Phillips	November 21, 2009
Both Len and Adam fight in Survive Mode but the latter retreats being unable to vent his friend. Xaviax continues telling Adam to gain Len's trust back threatening Sarah if he does not. While Len and Maya train, Eubulon manages to rescue Ventaran Riders Torque, Strike and Axe. Len and Eubulon explain to them what happened to Ventara and what is happening to Earth. Trent locates three of Xaviax's transmitters which Eubulon wants the Riders to plant a computer virus in while he goes back to the Advent Void. Hunt, Kamen Rider Axe, goes after one and comes across Adam who tries to gain Hunt's trust back by battling alongside him but fails. Meanwhile, Eubulon manages to rescue Kit and Kase from the void.
34	"Back In Black"	Mark Allen	Scott Phillips	November 28, 2009
Len, Chance and Pryce upload the virus into another transmitter and are then attacked by Xaviax's monsters. During the battle, Kamen Rider Onyx appears and helps them. Onyx then reveals himself to be Kit who, after meeting the Ventaran Riders, explains how he got the new deck. The four Riders then return to the No-Men Base where Kit meets Hunt. Len and Kase reunite when suddenly Eubulon senses Maya is in trouble and Kit goes to help her. Adam tries to gain Maya's trust when Kit shows up. Kit and Adam begin to argue with each other before they transform and fight. Kit nearly vents Adam but is stopped by Eubulon who decides to give Adam a chance to explain his actions.
35	"A Hero's Fall"	Mark Allen	Scott Phillips	December 5, 2009
Eubulon follows Len and spars with him to help him with his anger towards Adam. Maya returns the Siren Deck to Kase before Adam tells how he was tricked by Xaviax disguised as Paragon, also from the planet Karsh. Trent locates two more transmitters and Eubulon assigns two teams to disable them. Eubulon goes to look for one with Pryce and Hunt, who is injured when they are attacked. Len, Adam and Chance also locate one and are attacked as well. Adam convinces Len to give him the drive and when he goes to disable it Xaviax is there to temporarily shut it down instead letting Adam gain the Riders' trust. Meanwhile, Xaviax begins to decode the virus in order to create a Vaccine.
36	"Dark Deception"	Steve Wang	Nathan Long	December 12, 2009
As Eubulon heals Hunt's injuries, Kit tells Adam how Xaviax used his dad against him. Kit and Kase then go out and battle some mirror monsters. Len, Chance and Pryce look for the next transmitter and Pryce suspects that Adam isn't telling them everything. Xaviax sees Adam is having second thoughts about betraying the Riders so he disguises himself as Eubulon and berates then fights him. Kit and Maya ask Eubulon about Ventara and he explains he is from Karsh, where Xaviax was the leader, and built the teleportation technology but had a change of heart and created the Riders to stop Xaviax. The Riders disable the transmitter and return to the base where the last one is finally located.
37	"The Enemy Within"	Steve Wang	Nathan Long	December 18, 2009 (online)
Len and Adam are sent out to disable the final transmitter in Australia. Xaviax orders Adam to vent Len, but first he should let Len disable the transmitter to give the others a false sense of security. Eubulon continues to fix the Advent Key, Maya comes to Eubulon to tell him she is concerned about Adam. Eubulon checks in with Len and tells him to stay alert, and sends Kit and Kase as back up. Wing Knight and Dragon Knight battle the mirror monsters surrounding the final transmitter, and both of them transform into Survive Mode. After Wing Knight disarms the transmitter, Dragon Knight attacks him and they engage in battle. Kit and Kase arrive at the scene and find the transmitter shut down, but no Rider. Elsewhere, Adam is determined to go through with Xaviax's plan and tells Wing Knight that there's no beating Xaviax, and that he won't give up on Sarah for anything. Wing Knight and Dragon Knight transform into Survive Mode and continue to battle. Dragon Knight prepares to vent Wing Knight but can't bring himself to do it. Just then, Kit and Kase arrive at the scene, Adam tells them to vent him, but they refuse. Adam confesses that the transmitters aren't really shut down. They contact Eubulon to explain the situation and Len confiscates Adam's Advent Deck.: Note: Due to the show's cancellation the episode was made viewable online via the 4kids website on December 18, 2009, a day before its original airdate of December 19, 2009 in the United States.
38	"For Ventara and Earth"	Steve Wang	Nathan Long	December 18, 2009 (online)
39	"For Ventara and Earth"	Steve Wang	Nathan Long	December 18, 2009 (online)
The Advent Master devises a plan for the Riders to destroy Xaviax once and for all. Maya and Trent sneak into Xaviax's lair to create a mirror portal for the Riders, while the Kamen Riders must battle a massive swarm of monsters Xaviax sends to stop them. They all must race against time before the transmitters reach full power and the Earth is doomed. Eubulon and Xavaix battle in Xaviax's control room. The Kamen Riders rush to join them, but must fight off monster after monster before they all arrive at their destination. Finally all 13 Kamen Riders, including the Ventaran Kamen Riders just brought back from the Advent Void, band together for their final fight against Xaviax and finally all 13 Kamen Riders use their link vent to destroy Xaviax once and for all.: Note: Due to the show's cancellation, the two-parter was made viewable online via the 4kids website on December 18, 2009, a little over a week before Part 1's TV airdate of December 26, 2009 in the United States, while part 2 was unaired.
40	"A Dragon's Tale"	Steve Wang	Nathan Long	December 18, 2009 (online)
After Xaviax is destroyed, Maya recounts everything that has happened throughout the series in her new book, including what has happened to everyone since the final battle. All the Ventarans are brought back to their homes, and the Earth Kamen Riders are returned from the Advent Void. Kit decides he wants to be a Kamen Rider for good.: Note: Episode was unaired on TV in the United States due to the show's cancellation, though it was made viewable online via the 4kids website on December 18, 2009.
