= List of Swamp Thing (1990 TV series) episodes =

Swamp Thing - The Series DVD cover.

This is an episode list for the science fiction, action/adventure television series Swamp Thing. The series is based on the Vertigo Comics character the Swamp Thing and reprises Dick Durock as the title character. Originally airing on USA Network, the series ran from 1990 to 1993 with a total of three seasons. It was planned to run for 100 episodes but ended prematurely after 72.

In 2008, Shout! Factory released DVD collections of Swamp Thing episodes in their proper chronological order. The following list, however, lists them as they originally aired on USA Network.

== Series overview ==
Season	Episodes	Originally released	
Season	Episodes	First released	Last released
1	22	July 27, 1990	April 5, 1991
2	11	January 3, 1992	March 20, 1992
3	39	July 10, 1992	May 1, 1993

== Episodes ==
=== Season 1 (1990–91) ===
No. overall	No. in season	Title	Directed by	Written by	Original release date	DVD order
1	1	"The Emerald Heart"	Fritz Kiersch	Joseph Stefano	July 27, 1990	001
11-year-old Jim Kipp and his mother, Tressa are spending some time at her mom's house in the swamps of Houma. Jim is introduced to the mysteries and the danger of the swamp while Tressa struggles to bond with Jim.
2	2	"The Living Image"	John McPherson	Story by : Joseph Stefano, Judith Berg, and Sandra Berg; Teleplay by : David Braff, Judith Berg, and Sandra Berg	September 7, 1990	012
Dr. Arcane attempts once again to obtain the bio-restorative formula from the Swamp Thing. This time Arcane has a helper, and the Swamp Thing knows her as his late wife, Linda Holland.
3	3	"The Death of Dr. Arcane"	John McPherson	Story by : Joseph Stefano; Teleplay by : Judith Berg & Sandra Berg	September 14, 1990	011
Arcane has unleashed his latest mutant monster into the swamp to eat everything it sees and if this test trial works, then more will be released. To ensure that the Swamp Thing does not interfere, he takes a hostage and bargains for immunity.
4	4	"Legend of the Swamp Maiden"	Yuri Sivo	Lorenzo Domenico	September 21, 1990	010
Jim and Oboe sneak out on a midnight visit to the swamp to find the Swamp Maiden, who appears only once a year. Despite warnings from the Swamp Thing, they, along with a visitor from the newspaper, come to learn the meaning of "looks that kill".
5	5	"Spirit of the Swamp"	Yuri Sivo	Story by : Michael Reaves, Judith Berg & Sandra Berg; Teleplay by : Judith Berg and Sandra Berg	September 28, 1990	009
A voodoo priest named "Houngan" (Roscoe Lee Browne) is employed by Arcane to destroy the Swamp Thing.
6	6	"Blood Wind"	Walter Von Huene	Marc Scott Zicree	October 5, 1990	005
Arcane's protégé, whom he refers to as the "Crown Prince", is experimenting with hatred pheromones and his latest batch, which supposedly failed, is dumped in the swamp. The Swamp Thing has to intervene when Tressa is exposed and is in danger of being murdered by everyone.
7	7	"Grotesquery"	David Jackson	Michele Barinholtz	October 12, 1990	006
The Swamp Thing is overcome by toxic waste and falls unconscious where he is found by two men and is sold to a carnival freak show run by a cruel man in league with Arcane. Jim stumbles upon the carnival and tries to help the Swamp Thing before it is too late.
8	8	"Natural Enemy"	Tony Dow	Robert Goethals	October 19, 1990	008
A mutant insect is on the loose in the swamp and Jim's curiosity makes him a victim of its deadly bite.
9	9	"Treasure"	Tony Dow	Jon Ezrine	October 26, 1990	003
A thief on the run from his female accomplice chooses the swamp as his hiding place for a fortune in stolen cash and Jim's house as his final stop.
10	10	"New Acquaintance"	David Jackson	Lawrence G. DiTillo, Wade Johnson, & Daniel Kennedy	November 2, 1990	007
Jim is feeling lonely and tries to make a new friend when he meets a mysterious young girl in town, named Lily, who invites herself into Jim and Tressa's home, and who carries a dark secret.
11	11	"Falco"	Fritz Kiersch	Joseph Stefano	November 9, 1990	002
One of Arcane's mutants arrives in the swamp to exact revenge on him. The Swamp Thing tries to make him understand how to live with what he is.
12	12	"From Beyond the Grave"	Tony Dow	Wade Johnson & Daniel Kennedy	November 16, 1990	004
Jim and Tressa may have to leave the swamp after a lawyer delivers a notice of eviction in the form of a will from Tressa's late mother. They are unaware that the lawyer is in league with Dr. Arcane. Meanwhile, Tressa's mother's spirit guides her to the swamp where the real answers lie.
13	13	"The Shipment"	Walter Von Huene	Story by : Joseph Stefano, Judith Berg, & Sandra Berg; Teleplay by : Judith Berg and Sandra Berg	November 23, 1990	013
Arcane captures Jim and sells him into slavery after the boy is witness to the evil doctor's hideous transformations of men into monsters and the local sheriff is in on the plans. Jim's 17-year-old half-brother, Will, arrives to investigate Jim's disappearance and teams up with the Swamp Thing to find him.
14	14	"Birth Marks"	Walter Von Huene	Tom Greene	February 1, 1991	014
A beautiful runaway teenage synthetic human, named Abigail, escapes from Dr. Woodroe's lab when it explodes and is seen running through the streets by Will, who takes her in. Meanwhile, a baby is swept away by the waters of the swamp from the same explosion and is in the arms of the Swamp Thing.
15	15	"Dark Side of the Mirror"	Bruce Seth Green	W.M. Whitehead	February 8, 1991	015
Arcane plots and murders the local district attorney when he swears to bring Arcane down. A high profile murder tied to Arcane would be hard to hide, unless someone nobody would suspect commits the crime, like the Swamp Thing.
16	16	"Silent Screams"	Walter Von Huene	Judith Berg & Sandra Berg	February 15, 1991	016
Tressa and her friends are victims of another one of Arcane's experiments for General Sunderland. Tressa tries to save her friends when they suddenly disappear in the swamp right before her eyes.
17	17	"Walk a Mile In My Shoots"	Bruce Seth Green	Jonathon Torp	February 22, 1991	017
The Swamp Thing and Arcane switch bodies for a night and find that they are not fit to walk in each other's shoes.
18	18	"The Watchers"	Lyndon Chubbuck	Tom Greene & W.M. Whitehead	March 1, 1991	018
Tressa accidentally uncovers a pair of robots casing the swamp and the Kipp residence in search of any evidence of Dr. Woodrue's experiments. Abigail is on the run and the Watchers must deal with the Swamp Thing to get to her.
19	19	"The Hunt"	Bruce Seth Green	Wade Johnson & Daniel Kennedy	March 8, 1991	019
Tempers flare when Will's estranged father shows up looking for a rare white orchid that Arcane has paid him to steal. Will's trust is broken, and so is the swamp's when he leads his father to it unwittingly. Meanwhile, Arcane tests his poisonous mutant garden on Abigail.
20	20	"Touch of Death"	Walter Von Huene	Tom Greene & W.M. Whitehead	March 15, 1991	020
Arcane experiments on an innocent man by murdering him and trying to revive him with a serum, stolen from Alec Holland years ago. The man comes back to life again with severe side effects for anyone who touches him, even the Swamp Thing.
21	21	"Tremors of the Heart"	Mitchell Bock	Wade Johnson & Daniel Kennedy	March 22, 1991	021
Romance and murder are in the air at the Arcane complex when he and his newest associate, Sienna, build a machine to make artificial earthquakes for General Sunderland. The two bicker and kiss back and forth as the earthquakes put Tressa and the Swamp Thing in serious danger.
22	22	"The Prometheus Parabola"	Walter Von Huene	Tom Greene & W.M. Whitehead	April 5, 1991	022
An old adversary of Arcane is back in town and he has something Arcane wants. Tressa and Abigail are held hostage and the swamp takes a deadly blow as a result.

=== Season 2 (1992) ===
No. overall	No. in season	Title	Directed by	Written by	Original release date	DVD order
23	1	"Night of the Dying"	Steve Beers	Tom Blomquist	January 3, 1992	023
Arcane is possessed by evil spirits when he tries to practice voodoo.
24	2	"Love Lost"	David S. Jackson	Tom Blomquist	January 10, 1992	024
The Swamp Thing is struggling to remain hopeful that he will be human again. Someone from the past comes to visit him, using Will to guide her to him. Only Will does not believe that she is who she says she is, and he is about to learn who he can and cannot trust.
25	3	"Mist Demeanor"	David S. Jackson	Steven L. Sears	January 17, 1992	025
When a killer mist emerges from the swamp and invades Houma, the Swamp Thing and Arcane must team up to try to stop it before it decimates the whole town. Meanwhile, Will and Abigail race to warn the town.
26	4	"A Nightmare on Jackson Street"	Walter Von Huene	Jeff Myrow	January 24, 1992	026
Will has a secret from his past that comes back to haunt him. The swamp forces Will to face his inner demons, as well as the visitors that he does not know are waiting for him at the house.
27	5	"Better Angels"	David S. Jackson	Babs Greyhosky	January 31, 1992	027
Ann Fisk, a scientist and former student of Alec Holland, is in town. Ann's mentor, Carter LaRoche, has designs to build a recycling factory under Arcane's financing in the swamp. Ann must trust a strange voice in the swamp to expose an evil that she is not aware of.
28	6	"Children of the Fool"	David S. Jackson	Fred Golan	February 7, 1992	028
Will falls in love with a lovely carnival worker named Amanda, but soon becomes aware that Amanda is being held against her will by the shady carnie owner, Hurley, who has a dark agenda for Will.
29	7	"A Jury of His Fears"	Walter Von Huene	Tom Blomquist	February 14, 1992	029
Arcane is judged by the victims of his evil when he is killed by a laboratory accident. In this mock trial, he finds out who hates him and why, while he unsuccessfully tries to defend himself.
30	8	"Poisonous"	Walter Von Huene	Jeff Myrow	February 21, 1992	030
Ian James, an unscrupulous anthropologist, has come to the swamp to create a reputation for himself and the swamp suffers for it. Tressa is quite taken with him and in the process, the Swamp Thing is caught on film.
31	9	"Smoke and Mirrors"	Steve Beers	Tom Blomquist	February 28, 1992	031
Nathan Stone is a heavy metal musician staying alone in the Kipp boarding house where the Swamp Thing terrorizes him with a series of mind games as he seeks to teach the shallow and egotistical rock star to take responsibility for his wicked lyrics that have led to the suicide of two teenage fans.
32	10	"This Old House of Mayan"	Walter Von Huene	Steven L. Sears	March 6, 1992	032
Will is taken hostage by two greedy explorers who force him to help them find the location of a mystic Mayan temple in the swamp, housing buried treasure and ghosts.
33	11	"Sonata"	Chuck Bowman	Babs Greyhosky	March 20, 1992	033
Ann Fisk returns to the swamp to find the mysterious voice that guided her before on the suspicion that she knows who he is. The Swamp Thing has discovered a fascinating phenomenon about his power. Meanwhile, two brothers seek revenge on Arcane for his evil and Ann is caught in the middle.

=== Season 3 (1992–93) ===
No. overall	No. in season	Title	Directed by	Written by	Original release date	DVD order
34	1	"Dead and Married"	Steve Beers	Steven L. Sears	July 10, 1992	034
Will finds a car in the swamp, and attached are two married ghosts and their remains. The search for their killer, who just might be an old acquaintance of theirs, begins with the help of Will and the Swamp Thing.
35	2	"Powers of Darkness"	Chuck Bowman	W. Reed Moran	July 17, 1992	035
Dorian is an emotionally troubled teenager. He befriends Will, who begins to discover his troubled home life. Will and the Swamp Thing begin to try to help Dorian but there is one catch: Dorian could also be a vampire.
36	3	"Special Request"	John McPherson	Terry D. Nelson	July 24, 1992	036
Still fruitlessly searching for her missing son Jim, Tressa is diverted when she hears the voice of her former boyfriend, a radio jockey from the 70's. Tressa begins a second hunt for answers, as she discovers what really happened when her boyfriend disappeared 18 years ago, guided by his voice from the grave.
37	4	"What Goes Around, Comes Around"	Chuck Bowman	Jim Byrnes	July 31, 1992	037
Sheriff Andrews allows Dr. Arcane to hunt an employee for sport. To teach Andrews a lesson, the Swamp Thing traps the corrupt sheriff in a fantasy of the Wild West populated by familiar faces, forcing him to duel the evil Renegade Jake in a fight to the death.
38	5	"Fear Itself"	John McPherson	Brenda Lilly	August 7, 1992	038
The Swamp Thing's worst enemy is also the enemy of the swamp: himself.
39	6	"Changes"	John McPherson	Steven L. Sears & Jeff Myrow	August 14, 1992	039
When Arcane unleashes a genetic assassin into the swamp in the form of a virus, he gets more than he bargained for; he not only gets rid of the Swamp Thing, but he accidentally brings Alec Holland back.
40	7	"Destiny"	Tom DeSimone	Jim Byrnes	August 21, 1992	040
The ghosts of two temporally displaced Confederate Civil War soldiers appear in the swamp, one of whom is a previous resident of Will's house. The Swamp Thing assists Will to help the man to discover the mystery behind his wartime disappearance and make peace with his past.
41	8	"Tatania"	John McPherson	Randy Holland	August 28, 1992	041
Arcane finally resurrects his wife Tatania, only to learn the woman is an impostor. A few hours in the lab with this woman leads Arcane to discover the true whereabouts of his beloved wife and the identity of her captor named General Sunderland.
42	9	"Mirador's Brain"	Tom DeSimone	Bruce Lansbury	September 11, 1992	042
Arcane's genius mentor, Carl Mirador, has died. Using an experimental brain cell transfer, Arcane transfers all of Mirador's knowledge into his own brain. He also transfers Mirador's mental illnesses. Meanwhile, Will meets, and falls for, Mirador’s granddaughter, Dana.
43	10	"Lesser of Two Evils"	Walter Von Huene	Steven L. Sears & Tom Blomquist	September 19, 1992	049
Arcane's rival, Carla Jeffries (Tyne Daly) takes over his business, putting Arcane in the streets and stealing his "loyal assistant", Graham. The Swamp Thing discovers that she is a much more formidable enemy than Arcane ever was.
44	11	"Revelations"	Chuck Bowman	Tom Blomquist & Steven L. Sears	September 26, 1992	050
Graham leads a team of heavily armed mercenaries into the swamp to kill the Swamp Thing once and for all. Meanwhile, Tressa learns a few of the secrets of the swamp when she has a wounded visitor.
45	12	"Easy Prey"	Steve Beers	Jim Byrnes	October 3, 1992	043
A hunter and his son search the swamp for an endangered hawk. Their relationship is in shreds, and their conflict may prove deadly for Will, who has been adopted by the swamp to help protect the hawk.
46	13	"The Handyman"	Andrew Stevens	Terry D. Nelson	October 10, 1992	044
Arcane hosts a science conference, but it is crashed by a professional hit man who used to work for Sunderland and now has a score to settle. The Swamp Thing discovers the identity of the hit man and has a score to settle of his own.
47	14	"Future Tense"	Steve Beers	Terry D. Nelson	October 17, 1992	051
A chemical plant causing toxic damage to the swamp is the key to a darker future. The owner of the chemical plant and an obsessed journalist are teleported to the future to see first hand what the damage is causing.
48	15	"Hide in the Night"	Andrew Stevens	Steven L. Sears	October 24, 1992	052
Arcane's experiment to bring out the inner beast in a human being works a little too well. He goes on a rampage and his assistants will suffer the cost as they, along with the Swamp Thing, search the swamp to stop him.
49	16	"Pay Day"	Tom Blomquist	Tom Blomquist	October 31, 1992	053
Three convicts escape from prison in search of loot from a heist buried in the swamp. They soon discover they are not only being followed by the cops, but the Swamp Thing as well.
50	17	"The Return of LaRoche"	Andrew Stevens	Babs Greyhosky	November 7, 1992	054
Arcane is convinced that Carter LaRoche is attacking him in the night, but LaRoche is locked up in an insane asylum, and he is getting pretty friendly with Will.
51	18	"Rites of Passage"	Chuck Bowman	John Lansing & Bruce Cervi	November 14, 1992	055
Will leads two spoiled girls on a journey through the swamp that tests their character.
52	19	"Never Alone"	Walter Von Huene	Fred Golan	November 21, 1992	056
A lunatic escapes from a local asylum and knocks on Tressa's door late at night. He proclaims himself as an alien killer. Even the Swamp Thing is in danger.
53	20	"A Most Bitter Pill"	Tom Blomquist	Tom Blomquist	December 5, 1992	057
Arcane, trapped in a cave with an unconscious Swamp Thing, launches into a monologue that sheds light on his motivations and (deep, enormous) neuroses.
54	21	"The Curse"	Chuck Bowman	Jeff Myrow	December 12, 1992	058
Arcane and a scheming hack journalist unearth a cursed mummy.
55	22	"Judgment Day"	Chuck Bowman	W. Reed Moran	December 19, 1992	059
Will is arrested for a murder that he did not commit.
56	23	"Eye of the Storm"	Chuck Bowman	Brenda Lilly	January 9, 1993	060
Tressa's long-estranged sister returns looking for shelter from an enemy of her husband and ends up putting the Kipp house in danger, in the midst of a hurricane.
57	24	"Vendetta"	Steve Beers	W. Reed Moran	January 16, 1993	061
Arcane wines and dines a pretty reporter, but she is not who she claims to be.
58	25	"The Hurting"	Chuck Bowman	Tom Blomquist	January 23, 1993	045
When an elderly woman, named Irma Swanson, who knew and befriended the Swamp Thing, dies, her estranged daughter, Cathy, comes to town for her funeral. The Swamp Thing and the spirit of Irma then show Cathy the past of Irma's troubled life in order for Cathy to make amends.
59	26	"The Burning Times"	Mitchell Bock	Katharyn Powers	January 30, 1993	062
Will falls in love with a woman who claims to have known him in a past life.
60	27	"The Specter of Death"	Tony Dow	Tom Blomquist	February 6, 1993	063
Arcane and Graham are haunted by a poltergeist.
61	28	"Cross-Fired"	Chuck Bowman	John Lansing & Bruce Cervi	February 13, 1993	064
An experiment gone awry turns Arcane into a kind-hearted good guy and renders the Swamp Thing helpless and insane.
62	29	"Patient Zero"	Walter Von Huene	Judith Berg & Sandra Berg	February 20, 1993	065
An old man has a deadly, infectious virus that only Alec's blood can cure. Arcane tries to exploit the disease for himself.
63	30	"The Chains of Forever"	Mitchell Bock	Randy Holland	February 27, 1993	046
A mysterious couple search the swamp for the legendary Fountain of Youth. Arcane learns about the couple's plans and tries to find the Fountain first, as Will is caught in the middle of the couple's debate on whether or not the Fountain even exists.
64	31	"In the Beginning"	Chuck Bowman	Terry D. Nelson	March 6, 1993	066
Arcane accidentally creates a half-plant/half-robot with evil intentions from a mutated garden. The results are deadly to the swamp.
65	32	"Brotherly Love"	Walter Von Huene	Jim Byrnes	March 13, 1993	067
Brad is dating Tressa, but his brother is a killer who is looking for him.
66	33	"An Eye for an Eye"	Tom DeSimone	Jeff Myrow	March 20, 1993	047
The justice of the swamp comes in the form of a panther that stalks Arcane's compound. Arcane and his associates will be humbled one way or another, and the Swamp Thing can do nothing about it.
67	34	"Yo Ho Ho"	Walter Von Huene	David Kemper	March 27, 1993	068
A little boy dreams of being a pirate. When the boy accidentally stumbles on a plot from Arcane, it could cost him and his mother their lives. The Swamp Thing and Will help the boy's dream come true.
68	35	"Heart of Stone"	Mitchell Bock	Alan Jay Glueckman	April 3, 1993	069
The gods make a bet and the swamp is the playground.
69	36	"Romancing Arcane"	Tony Dow	Jeff Myrow	April 10, 1993	070
Arcane falls in love with a model, but his counterfeit emeralds can possibly doom their romance.
70	37	"Swamp of Dreams"	John McPherson	Randy Holland	April 17, 1993	048
The Swamp Thing gets addicted to hallucinogenic iguana eggs which makes him live out a fantasy of being human again. His addictions almost cost Will his life when Arcane gets involved.
71	38	"Heart of the Mantis"	Walter Von Huene	Steven L. Sears	April 24, 1993	071
One of Arcane's mentors, Oliver Duncan, has died, taking his secret research with him. Arcane is determined to get at what is left of his research by seducing Oliver's daughter Louise, but she has plans of her own.
72	39	"That's a Wrap"	Walter Von Huene	Story by : Steven L. Sears; Teleplay by : Tom Blomquist & Jeff Myrow	May 1, 1993	072
A film crew comes to the swamp for a TV movie about Arcane. Things quickly go awry when the lead actor is murdered and mysterious script pages appear detailing the truth about Alec's transformation and Arcane's crimes.
