= Salazar (surname) =

Salazar is a surname meaning old farmhouse (from Basque Sarasaitzu [old], which then evolved to "Sarasaz," and then to the modern, Castilian form "Salazar"). The name originates from the valley of the same name: Salazar Valley, in Navarra, Spain. The surname started appearing during the Early Middle Ages.

Its origins are also related to a certain noble family around the 10th century, the Salazars, that held a fief in the area. It later also spread to the rest of the Basque Country, being specially common in Biscay during the 15th century. During that time, Lope García de Salazar, a famous writer, took part in the Reconquista of Cuenca, where he was granted a fief and founded a notable family. Some of his descendants took part in the Conquest of the Americas, thus spreading the surname through Spanish America; others intermarried many noble families, and the surname spread all through the Iberian Peninsula.

Salazar is a common surname in Hispanic America because there were a number of Salazars among the early Spanish conquerors and settlers.

Salazar is also a common surname among Roma people. Due to several censuses made in the Kingdom of Castile during the 14th and 15th centuries, every Castilian subject was forced to take a name and two surnames. The Roma, who used to call themselves only by a first name, decided to take established surnames to add prestige to their families. They chose from among the oldest noble families, usually of Basque origin, thus it is extremely common to find Roma with surnames such as Heredia, Salazar, Mendoza, or Montoya.

== People ==
- Abel Salazar (actor) (1917–1995), Mexican actor, producer, and director
- Abel Salazar (scientist) (1889–1946), Portuguese physician, lecturer, researcher, writer, and painter
- Alberto Salazar (born 1958), American distance runner and athletics coach banned for life for emotional and sexual misconduct
- Alejandro Salazar (born 1984), American soccer-player
- Alexander Salazar (born 1949), Costa-Rican-American prelate of the Roman Catholic Church
- Alonso de Salazar (died 1526), Spanish explorer and discoverer of Marshall Islands
- Alonso Salazar Frias (c. 1564–1636), Spanish opponent of witch-trials
- Anaís (Ana Isabel Salazar, born 1974), Mexican actress
- Ángel Salazar (born 1956), Cuban-American comedian and actor
- Antonio de Salazar (composer) (c. 1650–1715), composer and choirmaster
- António de Oliveira Salazar (1889–1970), Portuguese dictator, academic and politician
- Antonio Sebastián de Toledo, 2nd Marquis of Mancera (c. 1608–1715), Viceroy of New Spain
- Ángel Salazar (born 1956), Cuban-American comedian and actor
- Ángel Salazar (baseball) (born 1961), former Major League Baseball shortstop
- Ariel Salazar (died 2018), Belizean crime victim
- Braulio Salazar (1917–2008), Venezuelan painter
- Carlos Salazar (disambiguation), Argentine politician
- César Salazar (born 1996), Mexican baseball player
- Cristina Díaz Salazar (born 1958), Mexican politician
- Danny Salazar (born 1990), Dominican professional baseball player
- David Salazar, multiple people
- Diana Salazar (born 1972), Mexican artist
- Diego Salazar (born 1980), Colombian weightlifter
- Domingo de Salazar (1512–1594), first bishop of Manila
- Eduardo Salazar (born 1998), Venezuelan baseball player
- Eliseo Salazar (born 1954), Chilean racing driver
- Elsa Salazar Cade (born 1952), U.S. entomologist
- Emiliano Zapata Salazar (1879–1919), Mexican Revolution leader
- Evangelina Salazar (born 1946), Argentine actress
- Fanny Zampini Salazar (1853–1931), Belgian-born Italian writer, editor, and lecturer
- Flavio Salazar (born 1965), Chilean politician
- Francisco Cervantes de Salazar (1514?–1575), Spanish theologian, writer, chronicler, and rector of the University of Mexico
- Francisco Javier Salazar Sáenz, Mexican Secretary of Labor
- Francisco Salazar, Chilean handball-player
- Gabriel Salazar (born 1936), Chilean historian
- George Salazar (born 1986), American actor
- Iván Salazar (born 1998), Uruguayan soccer-player
- Jeff Salazar (born 1980), American baseball player
- Jessica Salazar (born 1995), Mexican professional track cyclist
- John Salazar (born 1953), American politician
- Jorge Salazar (basketball) (born 1989), American wheelchair basketball player
- Jorge Ibarra Salazar, Mexican economist
- José Salazar (born 1957), Venezuelan triple jumper
- José Francisco Xavier de Salazar y Mendoza (1750–1802), Mexican portrait painter
- José Gregorio Salazar (1773–1838), general, politician, president of the Federal Republic of Central America
- Juan de Oñate y Salazar (1550–1626), Spanish explorer, conquistador & governor of New Mexico
- Juan de Salazar, maestre de campo in the Arauco War
- Juana de Salazar, wife of governor of Chile Antonio de Acuña Cabrera
- Juan de Salazar, Knight/Captain, military advisor to Maximillian and supporter of Richard III at the Battle of Bosworth
- Juan García de Salazar (1639–1710), Spanish composer
- Julia Salazar, American political activist
- Kenneth Salazar (born 1955), U.S. Secretary of the Interior and former U.S. Senator from the state of Colorado
- Liana Salazar (born 1992), Colombian footballer
- Luciana Salazar (born 1980), Argentine model and actress
- Luis Salazar (born 1956), former Major League Baseball infielder/outfielder
- Magdalena Salazar Palma (born 1949), Spanish electrical engineer
- Manuel Salazar y Baquíjano (1777–1850), President of Peru in 1827
- Marcial Salazar (born 1970), Peruvian footballer and manager
- Maria Elvira Salazar (born 1961), TV anchor and Representative for Florida's 27th Congressional seat
- Marina Saiz-Salazar (1930–1990), Panamanian composer
- Martha Salazar (born 1970), American boxer
- Max Salazar (1932–2010), American journalist and writer on Hispanic music
- Nick Salazar (1929–2020), American politician
- Noel B. Salazar (born 1973), European sociocultural anthropologist
- Octavio Salazar Miranda (1952–2024), Peruvian politician
- Oscar Salazar (baseball) (born 1978), Major League Baseball second baseman
- Oscar Salazar (taekwondo) (born 1977), Olympic taekwondo athlete from Mexico
- Philippe-Joseph Salazar (born 1955), French philosopher and rhetorician
- Rafael Cardona Salazar (died 1987), Colombian drug dealer
- Ricardo Salazar (born 1972), MLS and FIFA soccer-referee
- Richard Salazar (born 1981), Venezuelan baseball pitcher
- Rigoberto Salazar (born 1954), Cuban decathlete
- Roberto Salazar (born 1973), Peruvian footballer
- Roger Salazar (consultant) (born 1970), American former presidential and gubernatorial spokesperson
- Rosa Salazar (born 1985), American actress
- Rubén Salazar (1928–1970), reporter for the Los Angeles Times and KMEX-TV, Los Angeles
- Ryan Salazar, American actor
- Tim Salazar, Wyoming State Senator
- Vicente Lucio Salazar (1832–1896), President of Ecuador in 1895
- Victor Salazar (1911–1985), American businessman, political figure and officeholder.
- Víctor Salazar (footballer, born 1991), Colombian soccer-player
- Víctor Salazar (footballer, born 1993), Argentine soccer-player
- Zeus A. Salazar (born 1934), a Filipino historian, anthropologist, and philosopher of history.

== Fictional characters ==
- Armando Salazar, villain of the film Pirates of the Caribbean: Dead Men Tell No Tales
- Bennie Salazar, a central character and record company executive from the book A Visit From the Goon Squad
- Daniel Salazar, a main character in Fear The Walking Dead
- Griselda Salazar, a character in Fear The Walking Dead
- Hector Salazar (disambiguation), multiple fictional characters
- King Salazar, main antagonist of the animated film Wakko's Wish
- Ofelia Salazar, a character in Fear The Walking Dead
- Ramon Salazar (Resident Evil 4), from the video game Resident Evil 4
- Ramon Salazar (24 character), from the television series 24
- Rex Salazar, fictional titular protagonist of Generator Rex.
- Rosario Salazar, from the television series Will & Grace
- Víctor Salazar, main character of the television series Love, Victor

== Bibliography ==
- Euskal Abizenak, vol 3, pp 100–102. Lizardi Multimedia, Zarauz, Spain. ISBN 978-7-999006-41-1
- RAMOS MERINO, Juan Luis. "La caballería y la leyenda artúrica en Lope García de Salazar". En: Junto al Grial : miscelánea artúrica. Soria : Diputación Provincial, 2008, pp. 89–103.
