= List of Ben 10 (2016 TV series) episodes =

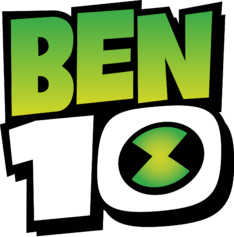

Ben 10 is an American animated television series based on the 2005 series of the same name. The series premiered in Europe, Asia-Pacific, the Middle East, and Africa in October 2016, and in the United States on April 10, 2017. It concluded on April 11, 2021. 166 episodes of the series aired over the course of four seasons, in addition to a film, Ben 10 Versus the Universe: The Movie, with the series finale serving as a multiversal crossover with all previous Ben 10 series.

== Series overview ==
Season	Episodes	Originally released	
Season	Episodes	First released	Last released
1	40	October 1, 2016	May 27, 2017
2	40	October 3, 2017	October 26, 2018
3	52	January 26, 2019	November 30, 2019
4	34	December 13, 2019	September 18, 2020

== Episodes ==
=== Season 1 (2016–17) ===
No. overall	No. in season	Title	Written by	Storyboard and additional writing by	Original air date	U.S. air date	Prod. code	US viewers (millions)
1	1	"The Filth"	Duncan Rouleau	Ryan Kramer and Andrew Stewart	October 1, 2016 (AUS); October 9, 2016 (UK)	April 10, 2017	1041–102	0.99
Ben Tennyson is tasked with cleaning the Rust Bucket, but when he is tricked into letting Sid and Maurice steal it, he must chase them down before they create an unstoppable maggot monster with the intention of holding Las Vegas for ransom. Omnitrix alien debuts: Grey Matter, XLR8, Four Arms, and Cannonbolt
2	2	"Waterfilter"	John O'Bryan	Ryan Kramer	October 8, 2016 (UK/AUS)	April 10, 2017	1041–119	0.99
Ben, Gwen Tennyson, and Max Tennyson's trip to Niagara Falls is cut short by tadpole-like creatures called Hydromanders, while Gwen attempts to rein in Ben's impulsive tendencies.: Omnitrix alien debuts: Overflow, Heatblast
3	3	"The Ring Leader"	Steven T. Seagle	Bismarck Datuin and Monica Ray	October 8, 2016 (UK)	April 10, 2017	1041–104	0.89
While winning big on a Sumo Slammers video game, Ben gets the idea to win a wrestling match until an intimidating wrestler named Iron Kyle decides to make it a true challenge.
4	4	"Riding the Storm; Out"	Story by : Thomas Pugsley; Teleplay by : Kevin Burke and Chris Wyatt	Ryan Kramer and Jenn Strickland	October 15, 2016 (AUS); November 5, 2016 (UK)	April 10, 2017	1041–116	0.89
Ben and Gwen's camping trip is interrupted by three emotionless robots called the Weatherheads (Gust-o, Hail-o, and Shock-o) but Ben's attempts to alter the Omnitrix transforms him into unstable fusions of his alien forms.: Omnitrix alien debuts: Grey Arms, and Amalgam Ben
5	5	"The Clocktopus"	Michael Olivier	Andrew Stewart and Kelly Turnbull	November 6, 2016 (UK); February 18, 2017 (AUS)	April 11, 2017	1041–109	1.04
In a peaceful coastal town Max went to as a child, Ben must not only face the steampunk inventor Steam Smythe, but also his fear of squids.
6	6	"Take 10"	Jason Adam Katzenstein	Dave Sherb	October 15, 2016 (UK)	April 12, 2017	1041–105	0.87
Ben accidentally allows a villainous group of bugs to go free.
7	7	"Growing Pains"	Emiliano Bolado	Will Patrick and Dave Schwartz	November 12, 2016 (UK); February 11, 2017 (AUS)	April 13, 2017	1041–110	0.93
Ben and Gwen are turned into babies by an insane nanny who wants to turn the world into a day care, driven to the brink at having been ridiculed by her peers.: Omnitrix alien debuts: Upgrade
8	8	"Shhh!"	Dan Marmor	Benjamin Lane	October 29, 2016 (AUS); November 13, 2016 (UK)	April 17, 2017	1041–120	0.82
While visiting a monastery with a no-noise policy, Ben accidentally awakens a dangerous dragon hidden in a secret chamber below the hallowed halls.: Omnitrix alien debuts: Diamondhead
9	9	"Brief Career of Lucky Girl"	Ed Valentine	Andrew Stewart and Kelly Turnbull	November 5, 2016 (AUS); November 19, 2016 (UK)	April 18, 2017	1041–118	0.74
When a wizard cosplayer gets his hands on a real magic wand at Cos Con, Ben enlists Gwen's help to help stop villainous mage Hex from retrieving it.
10	10	"Animo Farm"	Kevin Almeida and Jeff Treppel	Will Patrick and David Schwartz	October 16, 2016 (UK); February 4, 2017 (AUS)	April 19, 2017	1041–115	0.66
Ben is captured by a gang of superior mutants called the Alphas, who lock him inside the secret lab of their mad scientist Doctor Animo, and must help the lesser animals, the Accidentals, escape while stuck as Stinkfly.: Omnitrix alien debuts: Stinkfly
11	11	"Clown College"	Lawrence H. Levy	Benjamin Lane	October 22, 2016 (UK); November 12, 2016 (AUS)	April 20, 2017	1041–103	0.74
Ben teams up with Max's former badminton classmates to stop the clown Zombozo from robbing a football stadium.
12	12	"Adventures in Babysitting"	Zander Cannon	Deena Beck and Dashawn Mahone	November 19, 2016 (AUS); November 20, 2016 (UK)	April 24, 2017	1041–122	0.84
Gwen, Ben and Max encounter a family who are effectively their mirror selves. However, when their youngest child goes on a temper tantrum and uses a robot suit to bully others, Ben must work to calm the toddler down.
13	13	"Something I Ate"	Tom Pinchuk	Ryan Kramer and Jen Strickland	October 23, 2016 (UK)	April 25, 2017	1041–112	0.78
The Tennysons visit Fort Knox, where Ben ends up fighting a monster.
14	14	"Steam Is the Word"	Lawrence H. Levy	Will Patrick, David Schwartz, Elsa; Garagarza, and Monica Ray	November 26, 2016 (UK/AUS)	April 26, 2017	1041 123	0.84
In Silicon Valley, Ben has to stop Steam Smythe from getting an incredible power source sealed in a Tesla time capsule.
15	15	"The Beast Inside"	Matt Nix	Jenn Strickland and Erin Siegel	February 23, 2017 (UK)	April 27, 2017	1041–131	0.79
Doctor Animo returns with his newest invention, the 'Animerger,' turning humans into hybrids of various animals.
16	16	"All Wet"	A.J. Marchisello	Will Patrick and Kenji Ono	February 16, 2017 (UK); February 25, 2017 (AUS)	May 1, 2017	1041–125	0.81
When Gwen and Ben spend time at a water park, Gwen befriends the villainous Frightwig, but the mutant villainess manipulates Gwen with her friendship, shattering her relationship with Ben.: Omnitrix alien debuts: Wildvine
17	17	"Villain Time"	A.J. Marchisello	Andrew Stewart and Kelly Turnbull	February 13, 2017 (UK)	May 2, 2017	1041–111	0.85
A man named Tim Buktu attempts to be a hero by creating disasters that put people in danger and then "rescue" them from their doom, and Ben has to stop him before someone really gets hurt.
18	18	"Drive You Crazy"	A.J. Marchisello	Benjamin Lane	February 21, 2017 (UK)	May 3, 2017	1041–128	0.89
Ben and Gwen decide to race against the French racer LaGrange when he crashes a race.
19	19	"Tomorrow Today"	James Felder	Jenn Strickland and Erin Siegel	February 24, 2017 (UK)	May 4, 2017	1041–132	0.88
The group visit the Buddy's Vision Of Tomorrow exhibit, where Steam Smythe hopes to take a secret weapon to rule the world.
20	20	"Story, Bored"	Henry J. Stukenborg	Benjamin Lane	February 3, 2017 (UK)	May 8, 2017	1041–126	0.78
Hex returns for the spellbook Grimoire of Archamada, which will make him more powerful than ever.
21	21	"Hole in 10"	Shannon Denton	Deena Beck and Dashawn Mahone	February 22, 2017 (UK)	May 9, 2017	1041–130	0.76
While golfing, Ben must face a biker gang of mutated groundhogs, learning the values of patience and control along the way.
22	22	"Recipe for Disaster"	Michael Allred and Steven T. Seagle	Will Patrick and Mickey Quinn	February 15, 2017 (UK)	May 29, 2017	1041–124	1.20
When Ben puts out a fire as Wildvine, a trio of rival alien chefs decide to eat him for lunch, hunting him down.
23	23	"Rustbucket RIP"	Adam Pica	Benjamin Lane	October 29, 2016 (UK); December 3, 2016 (AUS)	May 29, 2017	1041–108	1.13
Ben gets a rare Sumo Slammer card in the historical village Oldeville, but Billy Billions wants the card too, so he steals and controls the Rustbucket until Ben gives it back.
24	24	"Freaky Gwen Ben"	Chuck Kim	Andrew Stewart and Kelly Turnbull	October 1, 2016 (AUS); October 10, 2016 (UK)	June 9, 2017	1041–107	0.94
When Ben interferes with Hex's quest for the Titan Gloves at a swap meet, he switches the bodies of Ben with Gwen, forcing him to walk a mile in her shoes and vice versa.
25	25	"Ben 24hrs"	Joe Kelly	Deena Beck and Dashawn Mahone	October 30, 2016 (UK)	June 16, 2017	1041–106	0.93
Ben and Gwen want to stay awake in Adrenaland, a theme park that is open 24/7. Thinking that with his alien abilities he can stay awake, things get worse when his sleepwalking aliens cause destruction across the theme park.
26	26	"Bright Lights, Black Hearts"	Jonathan Callan	Deena Beck and Dashawn Mahone	February 14, 2017 (UK)	June 23, 2017	1041–121	1.05
Ben, Gwen and Max stop by the graveyard set of a movie, The Unalivers (a parody of the Twilight series). Before long, Ben discovers its leading role, Michael Morningstar, is an energy-absorbing vampire.
27	27	"Don't Laze Me, Bro"	Julien Magnat	Mickey Quinn and Will Patrick	May 21, 2017 (UK)	September 1, 2017	1041–136	0.87
When Billy Billions takes over Laser Town Studios for his birthday, Ben and Gwen challenge him to a Laser Tag Duel, where the loser must never set foot in a game of laser tag again, but when Billy attempts to cheat by using giant robots, he accidentally turns the robots against humanity, forcing the three to work together.
28	28	"Don't Let the Bass Drop"	Seyha Klam	Ryan Kramer and Jenn Strickland	December 4, 2016 (UK)	September 8, 2017	1041–113	0.89
Ben and Gwen are excited to attend an Earth Day concert in Portland until the show is hijacked by the audio-manipulating DJ Lord Decibel, who, if not paid $1 billion in the next ten minutes, will make Portland fall into the ocean.
29	29	"Bad Penny"	Samantha Charlip	Andrew Stewart and Kelly Turnbull	May 13, 2017 (UK)	September 15, 2017	1041–133	0.90
Ben hangs out with his former babysitter Penny when they arrive at a pig festival while Maurice and Sydney create a helium weapon for their next big heist.
30	30	"Zombozo-Land"	Joe Casey	Deena Beck and Dashawn Mahone	May 20, 2017 (UK)	September 22, 2017	1041–135	0.75
Zombozo returns with the Circus Freaks (Frightwig, and two new members, Thumbskull and Acid Breath) and a new plan to turn everyone into clowns like him.
31	31	"Forgeti"	Michael Olivier	Deena Beck and Dashawn Mahone	May 6, 2017 (UK)	September 29, 2017	1041–101	0.72
During a hunt for the fabled 'Forgeti', Ben and Gwen face Doctor Animo once again when he kidnaps Max for his latest experiment.
32	32	"Max to the Max"	John Sazaklis	Ryan Kramer and Erin Siegel	May 14, 2017 (UK)	October 6, 2017	1041–134	0.76
When Maurice and Sydney accidentally split Max into 100 clones of himself, Ben must find a way to switch him back without getting divided as well, while Gwen is forced to babysit the childish and dangerously uncontrollable Maxes.
33	33	"Cutting Corners"	Justin Peniston	Benjamin Lane	December 3, 2016 (UK)	October 13, 2017	1041–114	0.87
Ben wants to earn some money by mowing Bob's lawn. He rebuilds the lawnmower into a super fast-mowing machine, but in doing so angers the little stubborn gnome neighbors, causing them to attack other humans.
34	34	"Xingo"	Evan Dorkin and Sarah Dyer	Andrew Stewart and Kelly Turnbull	February 20, 2017 (UK)	October 20, 2017	1041–127	0.89
Ben's favorite cartoon character, Xingo, comes out of the TV into the real world when Upgrade tampers with the TV satellite. However, when it turns out that his powers are incredibly dangerous and he has no regard for anyone getting injured, Ben must fight the crazy villain in the Grand Canyon while bound to normal physics.
35	35	"Scared Silly"	A.J Marchisello	Benjamin Lane	May 7, 2017 (UK)	October 27, 2017	1041–129	0.73
When the Rust Bucket runs out of gas on a foggy East Coast road, Ben, Gwen and Max are forced to stay at a hotel being menaced by a local folklore expert named Creepy Carl, but nothing is what it seems.
36	36	"Need for Speed"	Johnathan Browning	Deena Beck and Dashawn Mahone	November 26, 2016 (UK)	November 3, 2017	1041–117	0.84
While touring Yellowstone National Park, Ben uncovers a plot by Lagrange who wants to dig up an old treasure from below the national park.
37	37	"Omni-Tricked"	A.J. Marchisello and Man of Action	Benjamin Lane, Andrew Stewart, Kelly Turnbull, Will Patrick, Mickey Quinn, Erin Siegel, and Dashawn Mahone	May 27, 2017 (UK)	November 22, 2017	1041–137	1.23
38	38	"Omni-Tricked"	A.J. Marchisello and Man of Action	Benjamin Lane, Andrew Stewart, Kelly Turnbull, Will Patrick, Mickey Quinn, Erin Siegel, and Dashawn Mahone	May 27, 2017 (UK)	November 22, 2017	1041–138	1.23
39	39	"Omni-Tricked"	A.J. Marchisello and Man of Action	Benjamin Lane, Andrew Stewart, Kelly Turnbull, Will Patrick, Mickey Quinn, Erin Siegel, and Dashawn Mahone	May 27, 2017 (UK)	November 22, 2017	1041–139	1.23
40	40	"Omni-Tricked"	A.J. Marchisello and Man of Action	Benjamin Lane, Andrew Stewart, Kelly Turnbull, Will Patrick, Mickey Quinn, Erin Siegel, and Dashawn Mahone	May 27, 2017 (UK)	November 22, 2017	1041–140	1.23
Part One: Ben's trip to Portland with his family is interrupted by the arrival of a brand new, eleventh alien, Gax, as he fights another one of Doctor Animo's monsters. But when the Omnitrix starts behaving strangely, Ben begins to transform from one alien to another without being able to stop. Part Two: As the Omnitrix is still uncontrollable, Ben asks a mysterious friend of Max to repair it. But when three bounty hunters — Tetrax Shard, Sixsix, Kraab — land to recover the watch, Ben has to try and fight them despite his current predicament. Part Three: The gang heads into the forest to prevent Ben's transformations from causing too much damage. Meanwhile, Vil, who seems to be the same species as Gax, lands nearby. He helps Ben discover his powers, but Ben quickly realizes that this new friend is in fact an opponent. Vil brutally locks Gax, turning Ben to human form, and restoring his true form, the intergalactic warlord Vilgax, who quickly defeats Ben and the three bounty hunters, who are revealed to be fighting against Vilgax. This also results in Ben eventually switching through all his aliens, unable to revert to human form. Part Four: After his meeting with Vilgax for first time, Ben continues to transform rapidly without stopping or being able to revert to human. While Vilgax tries to take the energy of a volcano to recharge his ship and return home, Ben gets the idea to "upgrade" the Omnitrix by modifying it with Upgrade itself, giving him enough power to rapidly shift through his transformations and defeat Vilgax to save the earth.: Omnitrix alien debuts: Gax

=== Season 2 (2017–18) ===
This season was first released across the EMEA region in October 2017. It premiered on:

- October 2 in Turkey
- October 3 in the UK and Ireland
- October 20 in Italy
- October 23 in Central and Eastern Europe, Germany, Netherlands and Flanders, Poland, Russia and Southeast Europe, and Sub-Saharan Africa
- October in France and the Nordic countries
- November 11 in Spain
- November 18 in Portugal.

It was released in the United States, Latin America and the Asia-Pacific in February 2018. It premiered on:

- February 3 in Australia, New Zealand, and the Philippines
- February 4 in Hispanic America and Brazil
- February 19 in the United States
- February 24 in Southeast Asia.

No. overall	No. in season	Title	Story by	Written and storyboarded by	Original air date	U.S. air date	Prod. code	US viewers (millions)
41	1	"Out to Launch"	Joe Casey	Deena Beck and Dashawn Mahone	October 3, 2017 (UK); February 3, 2018 (AUS)	February 19, 2018	1055–141	0.97
On a visit to Cape Canaveral, the Tennyson Trio attend the launch of an experimental space plane, but when Vilgax hijacks the ship, Ben must stop him from weaponizing the shuttle.: Omnitrix alien debuts: Omni-Enhanced Diamondhead
42	2	"Battle at Biggie Box"	Duncan Rouleau	Benjamin Lane	October 4, 2017 (UK); May 20, 2018 (AUS)	February 19, 2018	1055–143	0.89
During the Biggie Box sale, Ben enlists Simon Sez to help him find Max and get back to the register with his toys before the sale ends and Billy Billions buys them instead.: Omnitrix alien debuts: Omni-Enhanced Wildvine
43	3	"Bon Voyage"	Steven T. Seagle	Will Patrick and Mickey Quinn	October 4, 2017 (UK); February 3, 2018 (AUS)	February 26, 2018	1055–144	0.82
Aboard the SS Pettigrew, on its maiden voyage, Ben must not only battle seasickness, but Steam Smythe, who looks to use his mechanical creatures to sink the steamship's replacement.: Omnitrix alien debuts: Omni-Enhanced Heatblast
44	4	"Mayhem in Mascot"	Duncan Rouleau	Andrew Stewart and Kelly Turnbull	October 5, 2017 (UK); February 10, 2018 (AUS)	February 26, 2018	1055–147	0.82
After their attempt to get a photo with every storefront mascot is foiled, Ben and Gwen sneak out at night to get their photo taken with a wooden bear totem known as Yawk. When it turns out Yawk is an evil spirit, though, Ben must stop Gwen from being eaten by the bear.: Omnitrix alien debuts: Omni-Enhanced Four Arms
45	5	"Screamcatcher"	Joe Kelly	Benjamin Lane	October 5, 2017 (UK); February 17, 2018 (AUS)	March 5, 2018	1055–148	0.65
When a cavity forces Ben to the dentist, his day gets even worse when Hex uses a dreamcatcher to bring Ben's fears to life.: Omnitrix alien debuts: Omni-Enhanced Cannonbolt
46	6	"Creature Feature"	A.J. Marchisello	Andrew Stewart and Kelly Turnbull	January 28, 2018 (UK)	March 5, 2018	1055–152	0.65
Ben and Gwen must save a drive-in theater when Hex brings a movie monster to life, but when it proves too much for them to handle, they must get help from Hex himself to defeat it.: Omnitrix alien debuts: Omni-Enhanced XLR8
47	7	"Bomzobo Lives"	Joe Casey	Andrew Stewart and Kelly Turnbull	February 2, 2018 (UK)	March 12, 2018	1055–157	0.72
During a routine trip to the DMV, Max takes a driving test to renew his license, but Zombozo hijacks the role of instructor, bent on revenge against Ben.: Omnitrix alien debuts: Omni-Enhanced Stinkfly
48	8	"Animorphosis"	A.J. Marchisello	Leiana Nitura, Kelly Perdue, and Jenn Strickland	October 6, 2017 (UK); May 27, 2018 (AUS)	March 12, 2018	1055–150	0.72
As the Tennyson trio dig up dinosaur fossils in the Badlands National Park, Ben is unaware that Vilgax and Doctor Animo have teamed up to steal alien DNA from within the Omnitrix. When Vilgax betrays Dr. Animo, however, hero and villain must team up against the alien conqueror!: Omnitrix alien debuts: Omni-Enhanced Overflow, Rath
49	9	"Assault on Pancake; Palace"	Duncan Rouleau	Deena Beck and Dashawn Mahone	February 1, 2018 (UK); February 25, 2018 (AUS)	March 19, 2018	1055–156	0.78
When Gwen enters a pancake eating contest at the Pancake Palace, Ben finds the Bugg Brothers and must stop them before they obtain an endless supply of pancakes to create their newest inventions, the Infestoids.: Omnitrix alien debuts: Omni-Enhanced Grey Matter
50	10	"High Stress Express"	Joe Casey	Deena Beck and Dashawn Mahone	January 27, 2018 (UK)	March 26, 2018	1055–151	0.73
During a live feed of a transcontinental bullet train, Lagrange enters the picture to outrace the train, but Ben joins in on the fun and will stop at nothing to come out on top.
51	11	"The 11th Alien"	Joe Kelly	Kelly Perdue, Jenn Strickland, Deena Beck, and Dashawn Mahone	December 2, 2017 (Poland); July 7, 2018 (AUS) (Note: This episode first aired in: Poland on December 2, 2017; Spain and Portugal on December 3, 2017; Sub-Saharan Africa on December 7, 2017; Turkey, France, and the Benelux on December 9, 2017.)	April 6, 2018	1055–145	0.90
52	12	"The 11th Alien"	Joe Kelly	Kelly Perdue, Jenn Strickland, Deena Beck, and Dashawn Mahone	December 2, 2017 (Poland); July 7, 2018 (AUS)	April 6, 2018	1055–146	0.90
Ben has a brand new alien: Shock Rock! However, when Vilgax reveals that its presence in the Omnitrix may destroy the Earth, Ben must decide if he should trust Vilgax or not.: Omnitrix alien debuts: Shock Rock
53	13	"Half-Sies"	A.J. Marchisello	Andrew Stewart and Kelly Turnbull	April 10, 2018 (Germany) (Note: This episode first aired in Germany on April 10, 2018.)	April 16, 2018 (Note: This episode was first released on the Cartoon Network App on April 6, 2018.)	1055–162	0.55
During a trip, Ben and Gwen squabble, but when Max hears of a rockslide nearby, the cousins must put aside their differences to rescue the trapped miners and stop Sid and Maurice from holding the city above them for ransom.
54	14	"Xingo's Back"	Joe Casey	Benjamin Lane	April 11, 2018 (Germany) (Note: This episode first aired in Germany on April 11, 2018.)	April 23, 2018	1055–163	0.52
Left to entertain himself, Ben stumbles upon a Xingo arcade game and uses Shock Rock to power it up, but when it receives too much juice, Xingo leaps out into the real world and our hero must go toe-to-toe with his favorite character, both in the real world and in the game itself.
55	15	"Bounty Ball"	Joe Kelly	Angel Lorenzana, Shawna Mills, and Will Patrick	April 12, 2018 (Germany) (Note: This episode first aired in Germany on April 12, 2018.)	April 30, 2018	1055–164	0.55
While Gwen listens to a lecture on the Transcontinental Railroad, Ben sneaks away to the gift shop. But once the Bounty Hunters (from Omni-Tricked) appear and corner our hero, Gwen must relay the information she learned on the train to help Ben escape.
56	16	"Fear the Fogg"	Kevin Somers	Ryan Kramer and Jenn Strickland	April 13, 2018 (Germany) (Note: This episode first aired in Germany on April 13, 2018.)	May 7, 2018	1055–165	0.54
As Max attempts to get Ben and Gwen to the Four Corners Monument before sunset, an ominous fog engulfs the roadway and forces Max to drive at a snails pace, but once the fog comes to life and attacks the Rust Bucket for its battery, Team Tennyson must work together if they are to navigate to safety.
57	17	"Super-Villain Team-Up"	Joe Casey	Andrew Stewart and Kelly Turnbull	April 17, 2018 (Germany); May 19, 2018 (AUS) (Note: This episode first aired in Germany on April 17, 2018.)	May 14, 2018 (Note: This episode was first released on the Cartoon Network App on May 7, 2018.)	1055–167	0.56
After a lull in alien antics, Ben suggests to Max and Gwen that he might be a better hero if he went solo, but once Vilgax enlists the help of Zombozo to build a giant machine to hypnotize the entire world, Ben must rethink his strategy if he is to defeat the evil alliance between them.
58	18	"Can I Keep It?"	Joe Kelly	Andrew Stewart and Kelly Turnbull	October 3, 2017 (UK); February 24, 2018 (AUS)	May 21, 2018	1055–142	0.51
After stumbling upon a cute cat-dog-rabbit hybrid, or "Cadobbit", Ben ignores Grandpa Max's advice and sneaks the animal onto the Rustbucket, but is quickly in over his head as it is revealed to be a creation of Doctor Animo, who turns Ben's new pet against him.
59	19	"Chicken Nuggets of Wisdom"	Jason Katzenstein	Rachel Geiger and Gabriela Camarillo Gil	April 19, 2018 (Germany); May 26, 2018 (AUS) (Note: This episode first aired in Germany on April 19, 2018.)	May 22, 2018	1055–169	0.63
When Ben and Max get into an argument, Ben goes Heatblast to blow off steam against Max's wishes; but once Dr. Animo spots him and subsequently turns Max into a chicken, it's up to Ben to save his Grandpa and stop Doctor Animo.
60	20	"All Koiled Up"	A.J. Marchisello	Abigail Davis and Gabriella Camarillo Gil	October 18, 2018 (UK)	May 23, 2018	1055–174	0.48
When Ben grows impatient with the slow pace of gardening, he turns into Overflow to pick up the pace and accidentally floods the community rock garden. But once a giant sink hole appears and frees King Koil and his Kimodo Dragon from below, Ben must quickly make up for his mistake and capture the baddies if he is to save the coastal city of Bayburgh.
61	21	"King Koil"	Steven T. Seagle	Mickey Quinn and Will Patrick	February 4, 2018 (UK); February 18, 2018 (AUS)	June 11, 2018	1055–159	0.35
Ben and Gwen volunteer for a day at the Repto Ranch. There they meet the evil King Koil, who takes control of the reptiles in the facility to create an army. Both of them must overcome their fear of snakes and save the animals that King Koil has released.
62	22	"The Charm Offensive"	Duncan Rouleau	Deena Beck and Dashawn Mahone	April 16, 2018 (UK) (Note: This episode first aired in Germany on April 16, 2018.)	June 11, 2018	1055–166	0.42
While hanging out at Biggie Box, Gwen grows jealous of Ben's aliens getting all the glamour and attention. But when she discovers that a new villainess, Charmcaster, is really Michael Morningstar's last remaining fangirl turned witch, Gwen must withstand attacks from both her and Morningstar, and prove herself as a valued member of Team Tennyson.
63	23	"Double Hex"	Daniel Marmor	Deena Beck and Dashawn Mahone	October 15, 2018 (UK)	June 11, 2018	1055–171	0.44
While bird watching at Pinnacles National Park, Gwen and Ben get into a competition of who can spot more birds first, but their contest must be held off until they can defeat Hex, who has found a stone that allows him to create copies of himself.
64	24	"Ye Olde Laser Duel"	Beto Skubs	Andrew Stewart and Kelly Turnbull	October 16, 2018 (UK)	June 11, 2018	1055–172	0.49
As Team Tennyson admires the modern train station, Ben sniffs out one of Steam Smythe's robots holding up the line. Fed up with Ben's interference, Smythe tricks Ben into engaging in a duel that will result in the loser's humiliation and forced criticism of the technology they uphold.
65	25	"Ben Again and Again"	Duncan Rouleau	Benjamin Lane	October 17, 2018 (UK)	June 11, 2018	1055–173	0.45
After Billy Billions' efforts to carve his face onto Mount Rushmore are thwarted by Ben, the two engage in a battle for the Omnitrix, going back to the time when Ben first gained it, but their meddling through the space-time continuum is causing history to destabilize. With the Omnitrix constantly changing users, can they save time itself?
66	26	"Vote Zombozo"	Joe Casey	Mickey Quinn and Will Patrick	October 6, 2017 (UK); February 17, 2018 (AUS)	September 10, 2018	1055–149	0.40
When the Rust Bucket must tune-up in the same town as Zombozo's latest campaign trail stop, Ben soon discovers the clown is using his speeches to hypnotize and then rob the town.
67	27	"Drone On"	Joe Casey	Benjamin Lane	January 29, 2018 (UK); February 4, 2018 (AUS)	September 10, 2018	1055–153	0.42
Ben and Gwen are in a competitive paper airplane war, but when drones created by Vilgax bombard the Rust Bucket, the cousins must work together to ground the aerial attack.
68	28	"Safari Sa'Bad"	A.J. Marchisello	Will Patrick and Mickey Quinn	January 30, 2018 (UK); May 12, 2018 (AUS)	September 11, 2018	1055–154	0.41
During a trip to Adrenaworld West, Ben takes a detour on a jungle cruise and finds himself hunted by Tim Buktu, who takes control of him using a voodoo doll.
69	29	"The Nature of Things"	A.J. Marchisello	Angela Kim, Leiana Nitura, and Jenn Strickland	January 31, 2018 (UK); February 11, 2018 (AUS)	September 11, 2018	1055–155	0.38
While sightseeing at the Geyser Gulch National Park, the Tennyson trio uncovers Steam Smythe's steam-powered generator and must shut it down before it overloads the power grid and causes numerous environmental issues.
70	30	"The Sound and the Furry"	Steven T. Seagle	Benjamin Lane	February 3, 2018 (UK)	September 12, 2018	1055–158	0.39
As Team Tennyson leaves the Frozen Man Festival, Lord Decibel takes center stage to ransom the festival-goers, threatening to create an avalanche if his demands aren't met.
71	31	"Reststop Roustabout"	Duncan Rouleau	Kenji Ono, Sam Szymanski, and Jenn Strickland	February 5, 2018 (UK)	September 12, 2018	1055–160	0.37
Ben, Gwen and Grandpa Max stop in the middle of the Midwest. While Ben makes himself comfortable in the mobile home with his tablet, Max and Gwen go outside to get some fresh air. When Gwen and Max are drawn into the hunt for a Jackalope, a mythical animal that looks like a rabbit with antlers, the mysterious animal soon starts tormenting Ben. But is it real or a trick of Ben's tablet-laden mind?
72	32	"That's the Stuff"	Joe Casey	Deena Beck and Dashawn Mahone	April 9, 2018 (Germany) (Note: This episode first aired in Germany on April 9, 2018.)	September 13, 2018	1055–161	0.47
A mysterious alien substance copies Ben's appearance and powers while Ben is visiting a space museum, and quickly assumes the shape of other people, leaving the Tennysons to find a way to reveal who is actually the mysterious substance.
73	33	"The Feels"	A.J. Marchisello	Benjamin Lane	April 18, 2018 (Germany) (Note: This episode first aired in Germany on April 18, 2018.)	September 13, 2018	1055–168	0.42
While Gwen and Max are enamored by wintertime fun during the summer, Ben isn't interested until the Weatherheads attack, intent on feeding off the emotional energy caused by destroying the town.
74	34	"Past Aliens Present"	Tanner Marchisello	Ryan Kramer and Jenn Strickland	April 20, 2018 (Germany) (Note: This episode first aired in Germany on April 20, 2018.)	September 14, 2018	1055–170	0.39
Ben is shocked to discover that Steam Smythe has built steampunk robots capable of masquerading as Ben's aliens, hoping to discredit the hero's popularity and simultaneously helping his crusade against modern technology.
75	35	"Dreamtime"	A.J. Marchisello	Ryan Kramer and Jenn Strickland	June 16, 2018 (AUS); October 19, 2018 (UK)	September 14, 2018	1055–175	0.40
After a series of nightmares affect his sleep, Ben refuses to open up to Max and Gwen about what's bothering him. Before long, the entire team is trapped in his nightmares as well, putting them up against Zombozo in a nightmare world.
76	36	"Innervasion"	A.J. Marchisello Marcus Rinehart Sean Geraghty Joseph Barnathan A.J. Marchisello	Deena Beck and Dashawn Mahone Andrew Stewart and Kelly Turnbull Benjamin Lane Jason Dwyer and Najja Porter Ryan Kramer and Jenn Strickland	September 22, 2018 (Asia); September 29, 2018 (AUS); October 22–26, 2018 (UK) (Note: This episode aired in Latin America and Brazil from October 22 to 26, 2018.)	October 26, 2018	1055–176	0.48
77	37	"Innervasion"	A.J. Marchisello Marcus Rinehart Sean Geraghty Joseph Barnathan A.J. Marchisello	Deena Beck and Dashawn Mahone Andrew Stewart and Kelly Turnbull Benjamin Lane Jason Dwyer and Najja Porter Ryan Kramer and Jenn Strickland	September 22, 2018 (Asia); September 29, 2018 (AUS); October 22–26, 2018 (UK)	October 26, 2018	1055–177	0.48
78	38	"Innervasion"	A.J. Marchisello Marcus Rinehart Sean Geraghty Joseph Barnathan A.J. Marchisello	Deena Beck and Dashawn Mahone Andrew Stewart and Kelly Turnbull Benjamin Lane Jason Dwyer and Najja Porter Ryan Kramer and Jenn Strickland	September 22, 2018 (Asia); September 29, 2018 (AUS); October 22–26, 2018 (UK)	October 26, 2018	1055–178	0.48
79	39	"Innervasion"	A.J. Marchisello Marcus Rinehart Sean Geraghty Joseph Barnathan A.J. Marchisello	Deena Beck and Dashawn Mahone Andrew Stewart and Kelly Turnbull Benjamin Lane Jason Dwyer and Najja Porter Ryan Kramer and Jenn Strickland	September 22, 2018 (Asia); September 29, 2018 (AUS); October 22–26, 2018 (UK)	October 26, 2018	1055–179	0.48
80	40	"Innervasion"	A.J. Marchisello Marcus Rinehart Sean Geraghty Joseph Barnathan A.J. Marchisello	Deena Beck and Dashawn Mahone Andrew Stewart and Kelly Turnbull Benjamin Lane Jason Dwyer and Najja Porter Ryan Kramer and Jenn Strickland	September 22, 2018 (Asia); September 29, 2018 (AUS); October 22–26, 2018 (UK)	October 26, 2018	1055–180	0.48
Part One: Message in a Boxcar: Ben and Gwen partake in a box car race, however the race is cut short when a large robot attacks. Worse still, Ben is hearing voices in his head while transformed Shock Rock. Part Two: Call the Dream Police: After defeating the Warbot and discovering Vilgax inside, Ben's "secret voices" only worsen and begin affecting his sleep, but once Gwen discovers a sleepwalking Ben using items from the campsite to create his own massive Junkbot, it is up to Ben to stop his own creation. Part Three: Strange Bedfellows: After the Junkbot shoots the Omnitrix and it begins glowing blue, Vilgax explains it is now a gateway through which the Fulmini Empire will invade Earth, but the only way to stop them is from within the Omnitrix, so Ben must team up with the ultimate baddie if he is to save his planet. Part Four: Mind Over Alien Matter: While inside the Omnitrix, Ben and Vilgax must work together if they are to close the gateway, but once the Fulmini leader - the High Override - appears, even that might not be enough. Luckily, help arrives in the form of a being calling itself Glitch! Part Five: High Override: While Ben struggles to avoid the High Override's mind control, Max and Gwen enter the Omnitrix to lend a hand, but once they find Ben is not who he seems, Max and Gwen must pull out all the stops if they are to get Ben back in time to save the planet.: Omnitrix alien debuts: XLRArmBlastDiamondHeat

=== Crossover special (2018) ===
Title	Story by	Written and storyboarded by	Original air date	Prod. code	US viewers (millions)
"Crossover Nexus"	Ian Jones-Quartey, Toby Jones, Erin Shade, and Dave Tennant	Dave Alegre, Anna Craig, Danny Ducker, Haewon Lee, and Parker Simmons	October 8, 2018	1064-074 (OK K.O.!)	0.76
When K.O. finds himself trapped in a mysterious place, he encounters other Cartoon Network Heroes and they band together to escape.: Omnitrix "alien" debuts: Jake the Dog (from Adventure Time), Prohyas Warrior (from Mighty Magiswords), Robot Jones (from Whatever Happened to... Robot Jones?), Festro (from Secret Mountain Fort Awesome), Uncle Grandpa (from Uncle Grandpa), Gumball Wattterson (from The Amazing World of Gumball), Mordecai (from Regular Show), Edd (from Ed, Edd n Eddy), Wirt (from Over the Garden Wall), Moxy (from The Moxy Show), Grizz (from We Bare Bears), Jeff (from Clarence), Grim (from The Grim Adventures of Billy & Mandy), Chowder (from Chowder), Captain K'nuckles (from The Marvelous Misadventures of Flapjack), Monkey (from Dexter's Laboratory), Supercow (from Cow and Chicken), Johnny Bravo (from Johnny Bravo), Buttercup (from The Powerpuff Girls), Dexter (from Dexter's Laboratory), and Finn (from Adventure Time); Notes: The events of the crossover specials take place during the fifth and final season of Steven Universe, the second season of OK K.O.! Let's Be Heroes, and the fifth season of Teen Titans GO!.

=== Season 3 (2019) ===
No. overall	No. in season	Title	Story by	Written and storyboarded by	Original air date	U.S. air date	Prod. code	US viewers (millions)
81	1	"Omni-Copped"	A.J. Marchisello	Andrew Stewart and Kelly Turnbull	January 26, 2019 (UK)	February 23, 2019 (Note: This episode was first released on the Cartoon Network App on December 14, 2018.)	1063–181	0.61
When Grandpa Max's engineer buddy Phil Billings gifts Team Tennyson the Omni-Copter, a vehicle that can transport the Rustbucket for overseas adventures, Steam Smythe takes to the skies to ground Ben and company's first test flight; but unbeknownst to our heroes, Smythe was sent to battle Ben's latest alien forms by a mysterious, powerful enemy.: Omnitrix alien debuts: Slapback
82	2	"This One Goes to 11"	Joe Casey	Benjamin Lane	January 27, 2019 (UK)	February 23, 2019 (Note: This episode was first released on the Cartoon Network App on January 4, 2019.)	1063–182	0.62
Before the Tennyson family embarks on their global road trip, Ben decides to make one last stop at the toy store, but encounters his old bully Kevin Levin, who has developed his own knockoff Omnitrix (the Antitrix) complete with corrupted versions of Ben's aliens. When Ben attempts to get revenge for the years of bullying Kevin put him through, he clashes with Kevin's version of Cannonbolt: Wreckingbolt.: Omnitrix alien debuts: Humungousaur; Antitrix alien debuts: Wreckingbolt (doppelganger of Cannonbolt)
83	3	"Rath of Con"	A.J. Marchisello	Ryan Kramer and Jenn Strickland	January 29, 2019 (UK)	March 2, 2019	1063–184	0.68
Back stateside, Ben can't get into a cat cosplay competition, Top Tail, without a cat costume of his own; but when he goes Rath, Ben's wild side quickly becomes much more than he bargained for, and must learn to hold in his rage.
84	4	"Poles Apart"	Tanner Marchisello	Benjamin Lane	February 1, 2019 (UK)	March 2, 2019	1063–187	0.68
When Ben, Gwen, and Max try to travel to the South Pole, magnetic disturbances cause the instruments to malfunction and take them to the North Pole instead, where they find that two criminal scientist brothers, Polar and Solar Twain, have plans to swap the magnetic poles of the Earth, unleashing technologic and atmospheric disturbance unless the world pays a ransom.
85	5	"Show Don't Tell"	Beto Skubs	Chelsea McAlarney and Henrique Jardim	February 2, 2019 (UK)	March 9, 2019	1063–188	0.56
Ben, Gwen, and Grandpa Max arrive at a Native American park to see the Ayasha Plinths, an ancient Stonehenge-like rock formation. But when Hex arrives, he casts a spell that causes everyone to interpret what he says as a lie, turning Hex into a hero planning on creating the Golem of Ayasha.
86	6	"Welcome to Zombozo-Zone!"	A.J. Marchisello	André LaMilza and Kelly Turnbull	March 18, 2019 (UK)	March 9, 2019	1063–191	0.56
During medieval times, Team Tennyson must fight to remember that they're not in the past at all, but actually at a Renaissance-ques fair, where Zombozo has hypnotized its guests into thinking they live in the past.
87	7	"Bridge Out"	Marcus Rinehart	Benjamin Lane	March 19, 2019 (UK)	March 16, 2019	1063–192	0.57
After an overpass collapses on the highway, Team Tennyson is trapped in a traffic jam along with Simon Sez and his family. But when Ben and Simon team up to tackle the gridlock together, Simon only makes matters worse.
88	8	"Beach Heads"	John McClain	Jenn Strickland, Leina Nitura and Josh Kim	March 25, 2019 (UK)	March 16, 2019	1063–195	0.57
After traveling to Tampa Beach, Florida, Team Tennyson hopes to get some much-needed rest & relaxation, but the Weatherheads have other plans that Ben must thwart: a solar powered tower so that they never worry about losing power.
89	9	"Charm School's Out"	Patricia Villetto	Benjamin Lane	March 26, 2019 (UK)	March 23, 2019	1063–197	0.46
During a family cookout at a forest campsite, Charmcaster uses her magic to switch places with Gwen, but when Ben catches "Charmcaster" sneaking about, he attacks, unaware it's actually his cursed cousin.
90	10	"Billy Bajillions"	A.J. Marchisello	Henrique Jardim and Chelsea McAlarney	March 27, 2019 (UK)	March 23, 2019	1063–198	0.46
In Aspen, Colorado, Ben, Gwen, and Grandpa Max are on a hike to find the Forgeti, but when they realize they've stumbled upon Billy Billions own "Winter in July" ski resort, Ben must battle Billy, with an assist from the Forgeti itself.
91	11	"Franken-Fight"	Tom Pinchuk	Eleisiya Arocha and Ryan Kramer	March 22, 2019 (Central and Eastern Europe)	March 30, 2019 (Note: This episode was first released on the Cartoon Network App on March 29, 2019.)	1063–199	0.64
Ben and Gwen's recreational drive in the Rustbuggy takes a turn when Glitch bonds with part of Kevin 11's version of 'Upgrade' named Bootleg. Not only does this cause the Rustbuggy to mutate into a metallic monster, but it makes Glitch become a speed demon who kidnaps Gwen!: Antitrix alien debuts: Bootleg (doppelganger of Upgrade) and Crystalfist (doppelganger of Diamondhead)
92	12	"Buggin' the Bugs"	Marcus Rinehart	Martina Gionfriddo, Josh Kim, and Sarah Visel	March 28, 2019 (Central and Eastern Europe)	March 30, 2019	1063–200	0.64
Team Tennyson wonders what the Bugg Brothers are up to when the group runs into them while vacationing at the Chrysalen Institute.
93	13	"Which Watch"	Joe Barnathan	André LaMilza and Kelly Turnbull	July 1, 2019 (UK)	April 6, 2019	1063–201	0.42
After a battle with Kevin gets cut short, Ben turns his attention to one-upping Gwen at Space Camp. But, when Kevin returns with his sights strangely set on his cousin, our hero discovers who is really behind it all: Charmcaster!: Antitrix alien debuts: Quad Smack (doppelganger of Four Arms), Hot Shot (doppelganger of Heatblast), and Monster Kevin (doppelganger of Amalgam Ben)
94	14	"Baby Buktu"	A.J. Marchisello	Benjamin Lane	July 2, 2019 (UK)	April 6, 2019	1063–202	0.42
When attacked in the jungle, Team Tennyson is saved by a toddler who looks eerily similar to Tim Buktu, but when they discover it really is a pint sized version of the nefarious globetrotter, Ben knows there's another threat looming: Nanny Nightmare.
95	15	"Them's Fightin' Words!"	Marcus Rinehart	Eleisiya Arocha and Chelsea McAlarney	July 3, 2019 (UK)	April 13, 2019	1063–203	0.46
Team Tennyson discovers a Hartfield-McJoy (a parody of the Hatfield-McCoy feud) reenactment in the cornfield next door, but when Hex resurrects the ghosts of the real feuding families, Ben must find a way to bring them together to save the day.
96	16	"Mutiny for the Bounty"	A.J. Marchisello	Josh Kim and Sarah Visel	July 4, 2019 (UK)	April 13, 2019	1063–205	0.46
While Phil and Grandpa Max tune-up the Omni-Copter, Ben takes the Rustbuggy off-road, but when he is suddenly captured by Tetrax, our hero must not only escape but avoid the wrath of the double-crossed Kraab and Sixsix!
97	17	"The Chupaca-bro"	Charles Kim	Cody Walzel, George Holguin, and Kelly Turnbull	July 8, 2019 (UK)	April 20, 2019	1063–206	0.43
Team Tennyson discovers that a small village's goats are being terrorized by the legendary Chupacabra, but when Ben realizes it's actually Dr. Animo, our hero must thwart the dastardly doctor.
98	18	"Buggy Out"	Yuri Lowenthal	Benjamin Lane	July 9, 2019 (UK)	April 20, 2019	1063–207	0.43
After winning a Sumo Slammers Champion belt, Ben returns to the Rustbucket to find it in the arms of Kevin, but when his rival hijacks the Rustbuggy instead, our hero must stop at nothing to get back what belongs to him. Eventually, though, Kevin and Ben must work together to fend off an attack from the Forever Knight, who is angered at Kevin's refusal to follow orders.
99	19	"Introducing Kevin 11"	Josephine Green Zhang	Eleisiya Arocha and Chelsea McAlarney	July 10, 2019 (UK)	April 27, 2019	1063–208	0.41
At a local swap meet, Ben instead sets his sights on a Sumo Slammer collectible, but when Kevin takes it for himself, our hero must get it back by overcoming Kevin's secret weapon: an 11th alien named Bashmouth.: Antitrix alien debuts: Rush (doppelganger of XLR8), Skunkmoth (doppelganger of Stinkfly), and Bashmouth (doppelganger of Rath)
100	20	"Four by Four"	A.J. Marchisello	April Amezquita, Luke Weber, and André LaMilza	July 11, 2019 (UK)	April 27, 2019	1063–209	0.41
During their visit to the Twin City, Ben and Gwen sign up for some Laser Town awesomeness, but when Ben is teamed up with Kevin, the two must overcome their differences if they are to end up on top, especially since Gwen has been paired with the mysterious Fang. To make things worse, a hit from a laser causes Kevin to be trapped in the form of his version of Four Arms named "Quad Smack", and he needs to find a way to fix his Antitrix to change back.: Note: This is the 100th episode of the series.
101	21	"Moor Fogg"	Marcus Rinehart	Marko Bajic and Bryan Baugh	January 28, 2020 (UK)	June 22, 2019	1063–183	0.37
When Team Tennyson's trip takes them to Scotland, they plan on visiting the various locales of Scotland, but their plans are foiled when the Fogg returns to exact its revenge.
102	22	"King of the Castle"	Jonathan Browning	Brittney Williams, Chelsea McAlarney and Eleisiya Arocha	January 30, 2020 (UK)	June 22, 2019	1063–185	0.37
Team Tennyson finds out about their British ancestry, so they visit their relative's estate, but mysterious events convince Ben that the place is haunted. However, it turns out that Kevin Levin has followed them to Britain, and showcases three new alien forms based on those Ben has lost: Thornblade (Wildvine), Undertow (Overflow), and Dark Matter (Grey Matter).: Antitrix alien debuts: Thornblade (doppelganger of Wildvine), Undertow (doppelganger of Overflow), and Dark Matter (doppelganger of Grey Matter)
103	23	"Speechless on the Seine"	Marcus Rinehart	André LaMilza and Kelly Turnbull	January 31, 2020 (UK)	June 29, 2019	1063–186	0.45
When Ben and the others take a trip to Paris, Ben, impatient and uninterested, accidentally gets himself locked out of the Omni-Copter. To make things worse, he can't communicate with the people of France, and Ben ends up in the clutches of Zombozo, who hypnotizes him into being unable to speak.
104	24	"Don't Touch"	Michelle Miller	Jenn Strickland and Ryan Kramer	February 4, 2020 (UK)	June 29, 2019	1063–189	0.45
Team Tennyson checks out a Samurai Museum in Tokyo. However, Ben finally comes face-to-face with the Forever Knight when he steals a valuable sword from the museum and starts a chase across the rooftops.
105	25	"Big in Japan"	Joshua Sky	Marko Bajic, Lasha Tamae and Eleisiya Arocha	February 4, 2020 (UK)	July 6, 2019	1063–190	0.27
Tim Buktu returns, seemingly reformed after saving people from a dragon in the streets of Tokyo. But the Tennysons suspect there's more to Tim's actions than meets the eye.
106	26	"Cyber Slammers"	A.J. Marchisello	Chelsea McAlarney and Henrique Jardim	March 19, 2019 (Central and Eastern Europe)	July 6, 2019	1063–193	0.27
In front of a biggie box in Japan, Ben waits in an eternally long line for the release of Cyber Slammers, the brand new Sumo Slammers video game. Soon Ben has to save the whole store - and not in front of the gaming enthusiastic customers, but before Steam Smythe, who wants to equip a big Mech-suit with Steam Punk powers.
107	27	"Big Ben 10"	Sean Geraghty	Eleisiya Arocha and Ryan Kramer	March 19, 2019 (Central and Eastern Europe)	July 13, 2019	1063–194	0.48
While Ben and his family visit the Big Ben Clock tower, the Bugg Brothers once again set up a crazy plan: they want to shrink Big Ben's bell to steal it!
108	28	"LaGrange Murraille"	Colin McLaughlin	André LaMilza and Kelly Turnbull	March 29, 2020 (Poland)	July 13, 2019	1063–196	0.48
Ben, Gwen and Grandpa Max walk along the Great Wall of China, but almost have their adventure spoiled by racers LaGrange and Vin Ethanol, who want to try a daredevil jump over the wall.
109	29	"Lickety Split"	Ross Zimmerman	André LaMilza, April Amezquita, and Martina Ginofriddo	July 4, 2020 (UK)	July 20, 2019	1063–204	0.30
When a mysterious electrical storm downs the Omni-Copter at the Equator, Team Tennyson soon discovers Solar & Polar are behind it, but when Ben accidentally combines the two into a more powerful Uni-Twin, our hero must think fast if he is going to save the planet.
110	30	"The Claws of the Cat"	Janis Robertson	André LaMilza and John Martinez	July 22, 2020 (UK)	July 20, 2019	1063–214	0.30
While taking in the sights and sounds of a Rio de Jenaro music festival, Ben bristles at Gwen's suggestion that she be his new sidekick, but when the festival is threatened by Lord Decibel, our hero must lean on help from Gwen and Max to defeat him.
111	31	"Roundabout"	Marcus Rinehart and A.J. Marchisello	Josh Kim, Sarah Visel, André LaMilza, and John Martinez	July 25, 2020 (UK) July 26, 2019 (UK)	September 21, 2019	1063–219	0.43
112	32	"Roundabout"	Marcus Rinehart and A.J. Marchisello	Josh Kim, Sarah Visel, André LaMilza, and John Martinez	July 25, 2020 (UK) July 26, 2019 (UK)	September 21, 2019	1063–220	0.43
Forever Knight finally assembles his Round Table of young but powerful Knights, including Ben, to conquer all of history.: This was produced as the season three finale.
113	33	"Cirque Us"	Cecil Castellucci	Josh Kim and Sarah Visel	July 12, 2019 (UK)	September 28, 2019	1063–210	0.41
Ben is the guest of honor at an upcoming Gala, but when the cirque entertainment turns out to be a disguised Zombozo, Ben must not only defeat the evil clown but his mysterious new sidekick, Pirouette!
114	34	"Forever Road"	Marcus Rinehart	Davin Cheng and Kelly Turnbull	July 16, 2019 (UK)	September 28, 2019	1063–211	0.41
During a drag race, Ben hopes to stay neck and neck with Vin Ethanol and La Grange as XLR8, but when his watch keeps shorting out, our hero must get creative if he is to keep up with his fast and furious foes.
115	35	"The Bentathlon"	Marcus Rinehart	Benjamin Lane	July 16, 2019 (UK)	October 5, 2019	1063–212	0.36
After stuffing their faces with gyros, Team Tennyson visit to Greece in the Omni-Copter, but when they are suddenly captured by the Forever Knight mid-flight, Ben ends up in a coliseum, where he is pitted against old foes: Iron Kyle, Queen Bee, Tri-Chef-Ta, the Ground Hawgs and even Kevin 11!
116	36	"Prey or Play"	Julia Edelman	Eleisiya Arocha and Chelsea McAlarney	July 23, 2019 (UK)	October 5, 2019	1063–213	0.36
After receiving an exclusive ticket to Adrenaland, Ben leaves behind Grandpa Max and Gwen to enjoy the perks of being the parks only attendant, but when he learns he's not alone, our hero must now contend with Billy Billions, the only kid who could afford the park's price of admission.
117	37	"Beware the Scare-Crow"	Ross McKie	Josh Kim and Sarah Visel	July 17, 2019 (UK)	October 12, 2019	1063–215	0.42
During a visit to the farm of Penny Bennyson's grandfather, Team Tennyson is haunted by a living scarecrow, but when Ben discovers that Aristocrow is behind it all, our hero must defeat Aristocrow's master, Steam Smythe, if he is to save his cousin's farm.
118	38	"The Night Ben Tennyson Came to Town"	Jonathan Browning	Benjamin P. Carow and Kelly Turnbull	August 19, 2019 (UK)	October 12, 2019	1063–216	0.42
Ben becomes paranoid when he thinks that all of his surroundings are caused by Forever Knight. Team Tennyson goes to Wheeler, a small town on Route 66 run by one person. There, Ben get paranoid and starts wreaking havoc in the town until he finds the real Forever Knight using bombs to destroy the mine. After saving his family and the people from the mine, Ben gets grounded by Max for his actions. Elsewhere, Forever Knight suspects that Ben should be a part of his team.: This episode leads into Roundabout
119	39	"And Xingo Was His Name-O"	Omar Spahi	Benjamin Lane	July 18, 2019 (UK)	October 19, 2019	1063–217	0.45
When a new Xingo app mysteriously appears on Gwen's tablet, Ben activates it despite his cousin's disapproval, springing a trap that transports Ben in the animated world and Xingo into the real world.
120	40	"Fear in the Family"	Janis Robertson	Eleisiya Arocha and Chelsea McAlarney	July 24, 2019 (UK)	October 19, 2019	1063–218	0.45
Ben and Gwen can't wait for the Omni-Copter to arrive at the Great Pyramids, but when bad weather disrupts their flight, they soon come face-to-face with the Fogg and its offspring.
121	41	"Xingo Nation"	Sean Aitchison	Benjamin P. Carow and Kelly Turnbull	October 1, 2019 (UK)	October 26, 2019	1063–221	0.45
Kevin gives Xingo a power up – setting him loose to wreak havoc on other TV shows – and it is up to Ben to stop them both.
122	42	"Heads of the Family"	Marcus Rinehart	Benjamin Lane	October 2, 2019 (UK)	October 26, 2019	1063–222	0.45
Team Tennyson stops in at a fringe family reunion, and Ben encounters a whole lot more than kooky cousins— namely, Kevin and the Bugg Brothers, whose latest invention sparks a series of head-swaps between all parties.
123	43	"My Bodyguard"	Tanner Marchisello	Eleisiya Arocha and Chelsea McAlarney	October 3, 2019 (UK)	November 2, 2019	1063–223	0.38
When Zombozo hypnotizes Grandpa Max's baking class, it is up to Ben and Gwen to clean up the mess, but it gets even messier when Zombozo reveals that Kevin has become his new bodyguard.
124	44	"Wheels of Fortune"	A.J. Marchisello	André LaMilza and John Martinez	October 4, 2019 (UK)	November 2, 2019	1063–224	0.39
Team Tennyson's thrift store shopping is ruined by the latest high-speed heist of LaGrange — who is now aided by a super-fast electromagnetic racing car — and Ben must convince Kevin 11 to help stop the speed demon's globetrotting robbing spree.
125	45	"Heat of the Moment"	Joseph Kelly	Josh Kim and Sarah Visel	October 8, 2019 (UK)	November 9, 2019	1063–225	0.43
After Ben easily dispatches the Weatherheads, Team Tennyson travels to a ski resort for some fun in the snow, but when Ben runs into the Weatherheads yet again, this time they are a force to reckon with now that Kevin has used his powers to unlock their emotional controls.
126	46	"Vin Diagram"	Kelly Turnbull	Benjamin P. Carow and Kelly Turnbull	October 9, 2019 (UK)	November 9, 2019	1063–226	0.40
When Ben finds out that Kevin and Vin Ethanol have teamed up, he becomes jealous, and especially worried that Kevin will try to have his friend embrace his bad side.
127	47	"A Sticky Situation"	Jason Katzenstein	Benjamin Lane	October 10, 2019 (UK)	November 16, 2019	1063–227	0.42
While Ben wants to stop Queen Bee from robbing a bank, Kevin also decides to show up, wanting to bask in the glory Ben gets as a hero.
128	48	"What Rhymes with Omnitrix?"	Chelsea McAlarney	Eleisiya Arocha and Chelsea McAlarney	October 11, 2019 (UK)	November 16, 2019	1063–228	0.38
When Charmcaster and Kevin end up in a poetry convention, Kevin's emo poems combined with Charmcaster's amulet (which she received from her uncle) gives her immense magical power and now seeks payback on Gwen.
129	49	"You Remind Me of Someone"	Michelle Miller	André LaMilza and John Martinez	October 15, 2019 (UK)	November 23, 2019	1063–229	0.31
After an encounter with the Forgeti, Ben and Kevin end up with the others' phones, causing Ben to turn into a selfish punk and Kevin into a hero. However, have they truly changed alignments or are their real personalities ready to resurface?
130	50	"Adrenaland Jr."	Rob Kutner	Joshua Kim and Sarah Visel	October 16, 2019 (UK)	November 23, 2019	1063–230	0.30
Team Tennyson visits Adrenaland Jr., a more safe version of Adrenaland. But when Kevin appears, Ben has to stop him before he destroys the park.
131	51	"Steam Fight at the OK Corral"	Aldo Pisano	Benjamin P. Carow and Kelly Turnbull	October 17, 2019 (UK)	November 30, 2019	1063–231	0.23
When Kevin convinces Steam Smythe to adopt a modern approach in fighting Ben, our young hero must resort to old-fashioned thinking to save the day.
132	52	"I Don't Like You"	Tatiana Krokar	Benjamin Lane	October 18, 2019 (UK)	November 30, 2019	1063–232	0.22
When Ben and Gwen try to create a cooking video, Kevin starts trying to gain his own following with crackpot conspiracy theories and encouraging the consumption of junk food. The social media war resulting from the two shapeshifters soon starts to escalate into real world conflict.

=== Season 4 (2020) ===
No. overall	No. in season	Title	Story by	Written and storyboarded by	Original air date	U.S. air date	Prod. code	US viewers (millions)
133	1	"Chicken in Chichen Itza"	A.J. Marchisello and Marcus Rinehart	Eleisiya Arocha, Chelsea McAlarney, John Martinez, and André LaMilza	January 17, 2020	January 19, 2020	1075–243	0.35
134	2	"Chicken in Chichen Itza"	A.J. Marchisello and Marcus Rinehart	Eleisiya Arocha, Chelsea McAlarney, John Martinez, and André LaMilza	January 17, 2020	January 19, 2020	1075–244	0.35
Part One: Pyramid Scheme: While the Tennysons visit Chichen Itza, Dr. Animo fuses a chicken and a snake to create a real life quetzalcoatl. Part Two: The Wages of Fear: Ben tries to stop La Grange from kidnapping the quetzalcoatl while gripped in self doubt. Omnitrix alien debuts: Omni-Kix Shock Rock, Jetray (unofficial debut), Omni-Kix Cannonbolt
135	3	"Ben in Rome"	Marcus Rinehart and A.J. Marchisello	John Martinez, André LaMilza, Josh Kim, and Sarah Visel	January 17, 2020	January 26, 2020	1075–249	0.42
136	4	"Ben in Rome"	Marcus Rinehart and A.J. Marchisello	John Martinez, André LaMilza, Josh Kim, and Sarah Visel	January 17, 2020	January 26, 2020	1075–250	0.42
Part One: A Slice of Life: The Tennysons go to Rome to visit a famous pizzeria, only to find that the Bugg Brothers have taken over it as part of their latest scheme. Part Two: The Bee's Knees: The Tennysons help Maurice when Queen Bee kidnaps his brother Sidney.: Omnitrix alien debuts: Omni-Kix Slapback
137	5	"Gentle Ben"	Jonathan Browning	Eleisiya Arocha and Chelsea McAlarney	December 13, 2019	February 2, 2020	1075–233	0.39
Grandpa Max's alma mater asks him to use the Omni-Copter to transport an important exhibit to an exotic nature reserve, but when the exhibit turns out to be a rare large baby moth, Ben must keep Tim Buktu from stealing the moth while learning that sometimes you need to use finesse and not force to solve hard problems.: Omnitrix alien debuts: Omni-Kix Four Arms and Jetray
138	6	"Funhouse"	Marcus Rinehart	John Martinez and André LaMilza	January 17, 2020	February 2, 2020	1075–234	0.39
The Tennysons find themselves stuck inside an inescapable funhouse constructed by Zombozo; Ben goes alien and fights to escape, ultimately proving that behind every illusion, there's a disappointing secret.: Omnitrix alien debuts: Omni-Kix Heatblast
139	7	"Summer Breakers"	A.J. Marchisello	Josh Kim and Sarah Visel	January 17, 2020	February 9, 2020	1075–235	0.31
The Tennysons journey back to the crater in North Dakota where Ben first found the watch. They discover a key that greatly boosts the Omnitrix and gifts Ben with robotic armored advancements for his aliens, starting with Omni-Kix Four Arms!: This is meant to be the season four premiere.
140	8	"The Monsters in Your Head"	Joshua Sky	Benjamin P. Carow and Kelly Turnbull	January 17, 2020	February 9, 2020	1075–236	0.31
Ben and Gwen learn a rumor of an alien invasion happening at the park they are camping at, but when they investigate, they discover a preserve containing a host of mutated creatures engineered by Animo.: Omnitrix alien debuts: Omni-Kix Humungousaur
141	9	"Queen of Bees"	Brandon Thomas	André LaMilza and John Martinez	March 26, 2020 (Central and Eastern Europe)	February 23, 2020	1075–239	0.36
Ben, Gwen and Grandpa Max arrive in Bismarck, North Dakota for its annual celebration of bee pollination, bringing them face-to-face with Queen Bee and forcing Ben to conquer his new fear of bees.: Omnitrix alien debuts: Omni-Kix XLR8
142	10	"Falls, Falls, Falls"	Daniel Marmor	Josh Kim and Sarah Visel	March 26, 2020 (Central and Eastern Europe)	February 23, 2020	1075–240	0.36
Team Tennyson must save Shoshone Falls from Steam Smythe.: Omnitrix alien debuts: Omni-Kix Rath
143	11	"The Greatest Lake"	Jonathan Rivera	Benjamin P. Carow and Kelly Turnbull	March 27, 2020 (Central and Eastern Europe)	March 1, 2020	1075–241	0.34
While visiting Lake Erie, a relaxing day at the beach gets all washed up when Ben, Gwen and Grandpa Max come face-to-face with Hex and Kevin.
144	12	"Mud on the Run"	Tom Pinchuk	Benjamin Lane	March 27, 2020 (Central and Eastern Europe)	March 1, 2020	1075–242	0.34
Team Tennyson faces tough competition at an obstacle race. While Grandpa Max struggles to keep pace with an unbelievably fit rival, Ben and Gwen run into the Weatherheads, who have secretly masterminded the race to test mankind!: Omnitrix alien debuts: Omni-Kix Diamondhead
145	13	"It's Story Time"	Curtis Baxter	Josh Kim and Sarah Visel	March 31, 2020 (Central and Eastern Europe)	March 15, 2020	1075–245	0.36
After the Rustbucket breaks down, Ben, Gwen and Grandpa Max find themselves killing time at the local town library, but soon scramble to out maneuver Hex as he searches for a hidden ancient artifact of great mystical power.
146	14	"Cosplay Day"	Charlie Fountaine	Benjamin P. Carow and Kelly Turnbull	March 31, 2020 (Central and Eastern Europe)	March 15, 2020	1075–246	0.36
Team Tennyson enjoy the biggest convention in town, but when a gawky costume store employee finds a familiar-looking helmet in the back of the store and tries it on, Ben is faced with the return of an old foe in a new form: Forever Knight!
147	15	"Bottomless Ben"	Colin J. McLaughlin	Benjamin Lane	April 1, 2020 (Central and Eastern Europe)	March 22, 2020	1075–247	0.29
While visiting Carlsbad Caverns National Park, the Tennyson's come across the "Bottomless Pit", a naturally formed pit with no bottom. Ben fights his better judgment to jump in the pit and be the first person to find the bottom, until Kevin 11 shows up and starts to goad Ben into a contest to the bottom of the pit! The natural rivalry is put on hold, however, with the arrival of Breaker One-Nine, who has come to destroy the Caverns!
148	16	"Tales from the Omnitrix"	Marcus Rinehart	Eleisiya Arocha and Chelsea McAlarney	April 1, 2020 (Central and Eastern Europe)	March 22, 2020	1075–248	0.29
Team Tennyson trade campfire stories in an anthology-style series that pits Ben against his archrival, Kevin, and teaches him the power of imagination.
149	17	"Party Poopers"	Patricia Villetto	Benjamin P. Carow and Kelly Turnbull	April 3, 2020 (Central and Eastern Europe)	March 29, 2020	1075–251	0.31
Ben completely ignores Gwen when she takes him to a family fun center. Meanwhile Frightwig pushes Zombozo back into a life of crime after he ends up becoming a party clown. Now both Ben and Zombozo will have to learn that you shouldn't ignore your friends!
150	18	"Wind Some, Lose Some"	Meredith Jennings-Offen	Benjamin Lane	April 3, 2020 (Central and Eastern Europe)	March 29, 2020	1075–252	0.31
At the Mojave Wind Farm in Texas, Max and Gwen plan to set Ben straight on his kooky ideas about how wind works. But when they find the Weatherheads using the towering turbines for their latest nefarious plan, will Ben face facts in time to blow them away?
151	19	"Digital Quality"	Omar Spahi	Eleisiya Arocha and Chelsea McAlarney	2020	April 5, 2020	1075–253	0.26
Ben and Gwen don't want to go to the CD Library, but Lord Decibel ends up trapping them inside it and demands a ransom. Ben and Gwen find Kevin inside on a potentially nefarious quest of his own, but it turns out that Lord Decibel may have already found the item that they so desperately desire.
152	20	"Tim Buk-TV"	Jonathan Browning	John Martinez and André LaMilza	October 3, 2020 (Central and Eastern Europe)	April 5, 2020	1075–254	0.26
Team Tennyson heads to the Okefenokee Swamp to witness the blooming of the Blushing Orchid, something that happens once every one hundred years. But their plans get disrupted when Tim Buktu, trying to make his new "reality" show more exciting, endangers the rare flower and everyone else at the swamp.
153	21	"Tokyo Fun"	David Baker and Michelle Miller	Benjamin Lane, Eleisiya Arocha and Chelsea McAlarney	March 25, 2020 (Central and Eastern Europe)	September 13, 2020	1075–237	0.16
154	22	"Tokyo Fun"	David Baker and Michelle Miller	Benjamin Lane, Eleisiya Arocha and Chelsea McAlarney	March 25, 2020 (Central and Eastern Europe)	September 13, 2020	1075–238	0.16
Part One: Big Bugg Bash: While in Tokyo, Team Tennyson comes face to face with a horrible secret, Japan's hottest new restaurant is being run by the Bugg Brothers as a nefarious scheme to make loads of money off an unsuspecting public. Part Two: Slamming It Up: While on a visit to the Sumo Slammers Amusement Park in Tokyo, Team Tennyson gets to watch a genuine sumo wrestling match as part of the Global Games, but when the mischievous Twain Twins crash the event to avenge their mother's medal snub years earlier, Ben must think things through if he is to stop the polarizing family!
155	23	"Growing Up is Hard to Do"	Janis Robertson	Josh Kim and Sarah Visel	October 4, 2020 (Central and Eastern Europe)	September 13, 2020	1075–255	0.18
Ben and Gwen are stoked to enter a skating competition, but when Nanny Nightmare shows up to teach the skater kids some manners by turning them into babies, it's up to Team Tennyson to up their game if they are to have any chance at saving the day.
156	24	"The Hex Factor"	Kelly Turnbull	Benjamin P. Carow and Kelly Turnbull	October 4, 2020 (Central and Eastern Europe)	September 13, 2020	1075–256	0.20
When Hex mistakes an exclusive magic club for a top-secret wizard society that had snubbed him, Ben has to figure out how to work around the club's strict code of conduct to stop him without getting booted by security.
157	25	"Sweet Tooth"	A.J. Marchisello	Benjamin Lane	October 5, 2020 (Central and Eastern Europe)	September 14, 2020	1075–257	0.17
On a trip to the dentist's office, Ben's suspicions that something is odd with his dentist are proven when he transforms into the monstrous Toothache. Ben must save the day!
158	26	"Medieval Upheaval"	Chelsea McAlarney	Eleisiya Arocha and Chelsea McAlarney	October 5, 2020 (Central and Eastern Europe)	September 14, 2020	1075–258	0.17
When Steam Smythe 'time travels' his way into a Renaissance Faire and kidnaps Max, Ben and Gwen must defeat him without breaking character.
159	27	"Speed of Sound"	Marcus Rinehart	John Martinez and André LaMilza	October 6, 2020 (Central and Eastern Europe)	September 15, 2020	1075–259	0.21
Team Tennyson participate in the inaugural ride of the fastest train in the world but the conductor turns out to be Lord Decibel and Ben must derail his master plan.
160	28	"Xingo's World"	Brandon Thomas	Josh Kim and Sarah Visel	October 6, 2020 (Central and Eastern Europe)	September 15, 2020	1075–260	0.24
Ben and Gwen run errands with Glitch, but when Ben is sucked into Xingo's failing cartoon, he is spurred to help him recover its budget.
161	29	"Tummy Ache"	A.J. Marchisello	Benjamin P. Carow and Kelly Turnbull	October 7, 2020 (Central and Eastern Europe)	September 16, 2020	1075–261	0.21
Team Tennyson go on a tour of the new Biggie Box Candy Store but when Toothache breaks out and kidnaps the owner, it is up to Ben to stop the monstrous dentist.
162	30	"Players of the Lost Park"	Steve Orlando	Benjamin Lane	October 7, 2020 (Central and Eastern Europe)	September 16, 2020	1075–262	0.22
When Team Tennyson visit Raspberry Park, they get more than they bargained for. What they think are innocent games of chance are a revenge plot by Zombozo to steal the Rustbuggy.
163	31	"De-Fanged!"	A.J. Marchisello	Kacie Hermanson, Johnny Vu, and Chelsea McAlarney	October 8, 2020 (Central and Eastern Europe)	September 17, 2020	1075–263	0.24
Team Tennyson travel to the new Laser Town VR but when Kevin cheats his way to the top, Ben must team up with former champ Fang if he is going to defeat his souped-up rival.
164	32	"Mock 10"	Marcus Rinehart	John Martinez and André LaMilza	October 8, 2020 (Central and Eastern Europe)	September 17, 2020	1075–264	0.25
Ben, Kevin, and LaGrange find themselves stuck "outside of time" after the latter hijack a supersonic train with a fault engine, forcing the trio to team up and slow down.
165	33	"Rekoil"	Marcus Rinehart	Josh Kim and Sarah Visel	October 9, 2020 (Central and Eastern Europe)	September 18, 2020	1075–265	0.21
As Team Tennyson stops Dr. Animo from raiding the animal shelter, Ben faces one villain more than he bargained for -- King Koil, now Animo's pet.
166	34	"Buktu the Future"	A.J. Marchisello	Benjamin P. Carow and Kelly Turnbull	October 9, 2020 (Central and Eastern Europe)	September 18, 2020	1075–266	0.19
After Tim Buktu's live stream is mysteriously cut short, Team Tennyson must break inside the highly confidential Area 55 to save him.

== Film (2020) ==
Ben 10 Versus the Universe: The Movie, a feature-length film based on the series, premiered on October 10, 2020 on Cartoon Network.

No.	Title	Story by	Written and storyboarded by	Original air date	U.S. air date	Prod. code	US viewers (millions)
1	"Ben 10 Versus the Universe: The Movie"	A.J. Marchisello, Marcus Rinehart, and Tanner Marchisello	Benjamin Lane, Chelsea McAlarney, Johnny Vu, André LaMilza, John Martinez, Josh Kim, Sarah Visel, Benjamin P. Carow, and Kelly Turnbull	October 10, 2020 (Central and Eastern Europe)	October 10, 2020	1075–267	0.33
1	"Ben 10 Versus the Universe: The Movie"	A.J. Marchisello, Marcus Rinehart, and Tanner Marchisello	Benjamin Lane, Chelsea McAlarney, Johnny Vu, André LaMilza, John Martinez, Josh Kim, Sarah Visel, Benjamin P. Carow, and Kelly Turnbull	October 10, 2020 (Central and Eastern Europe)	October 10, 2020	1075–268	0.33
1	"Ben 10 Versus the Universe: The Movie"	A.J. Marchisello, Marcus Rinehart, and Tanner Marchisello	Benjamin Lane, Chelsea McAlarney, Johnny Vu, André LaMilza, John Martinez, Josh Kim, Sarah Visel, Benjamin P. Carow, and Kelly Turnbull	October 10, 2020 (Central and Eastern Europe)	October 10, 2020	1075–269	0.33
1	"Ben 10 Versus the Universe: The Movie"	A.J. Marchisello, Marcus Rinehart, and Tanner Marchisello	Benjamin Lane, Chelsea McAlarney, Johnny Vu, André LaMilza, John Martinez, Josh Kim, Sarah Visel, Benjamin P. Carow, and Kelly Turnbull	October 10, 2020 (Central and Eastern Europe)	October 10, 2020	1075–270	0.33
1	"Ben 10 Versus the Universe: The Movie"	A.J. Marchisello, Marcus Rinehart, and Tanner Marchisello	Benjamin Lane, Chelsea McAlarney, Johnny Vu, André LaMilza, John Martinez, Josh Kim, Sarah Visel, Benjamin P. Carow, and Kelly Turnbull	October 10, 2020 (Central and Eastern Europe)	October 10, 2020	1075–271	0.33
1	"Ben 10 Versus the Universe: The Movie"	A.J. Marchisello, Marcus Rinehart, and Tanner Marchisello	Benjamin Lane, Chelsea McAlarney, Johnny Vu, André LaMilza, John Martinez, Josh Kim, Sarah Visel, Benjamin P. Carow, and Kelly Turnbull	October 10, 2020 (Central and Eastern Europe)	October 10, 2020	1075–272LF	0.33
Ben's arch-nemesis Vilgax returns to double the damage on Team Tennyson and planet Earth itself, forcing Ben to go interstellar to save the Earth where he encounters the Omnitrix's creator, Azmuth.: Omnitrix alien debuts: Omni-Kix Jetray, Omni-Naut Jetray, Omni-Naut Humungousaur, Omni-Naut Heatblast, Goop, Omni-Naut Shock Rock, Way Big; Antitrix alien debuts: (by Vilgax) Anti-Vilgax and Alien V

== Specials (2021) ==
No. overall	No. in season	Title	Story by	Written and storyboarded by	Original air date	U.S. air date	Prod. code	US viewers (millions)
167	1	"Ben 10,010"	A.J. Marchisello and Marcus Rinehart	Benjamin P. Carow, Kelly Turnbull, Benjamin Lane, Chelsea McAlarney, Johnny Vu, André LaMilza, and John Martinez	February 27, 2021 (Central and Eastern Europe)	April 9, 2021	1095–409	0.18
168	1	"Ben 10,010"	A.J. Marchisello and Marcus Rinehart	Benjamin P. Carow, Kelly Turnbull, Benjamin Lane, Chelsea McAlarney, Johnny Vu, André LaMilza, and John Martinez	February 27, 2021 (Central and Eastern Europe)	April 9, 2021	1095–410	0.18
169	1	"Ben 10,010"	A.J. Marchisello and Marcus Rinehart	Benjamin P. Carow, Kelly Turnbull, Benjamin Lane, Chelsea McAlarney, Johnny Vu, André LaMilza, and John Martinez	February 27, 2021 (Central and Eastern Europe)	April 9, 2021	1095–411	0.18
170	1	"Ben 10,010"	A.J. Marchisello and Marcus Rinehart	Benjamin P. Carow, Kelly Turnbull, Benjamin Lane, Chelsea McAlarney, Johnny Vu, André LaMilza, and John Martinez	February 27, 2021 (Central and Eastern Europe)	April 9, 2021	1095–412H	0.18
In the distant future, president Gwen Tennyson enlists the help of her cousin, a disillusioned Ben 10,000 to save the planet from an alien race called the Xerge. Ben 10,000 then decides to use time travel to enlist the help of his 10-year-old self to help him with saving the future, using the power of a new alien of the same race Ben discovered called Surge.: Omnitrix alien debuts: Surge; Omnitrix (Future) alien debuts: (by Ben 10,000) Spidermonkey and Buzzshock; Antitrix alien debuts: (by Future Kevin) Humungouraptor
171	2	"Ben Gen 10"	A.J. Marchisello and Marcus Rinehart	Chelsea McAlarney, Johnny Vu, André LaMilza, John Martinez, Josh Kim, Sarah Visel, Benjamin P. Carow, and Kelly Turnbull	May 9, 2021 (Central and Eastern Europe)	April 10, 2021	1095–401	0.24
172	2	"Ben Gen 10"	A.J. Marchisello and Marcus Rinehart	Chelsea McAlarney, Johnny Vu, André LaMilza, John Martinez, Josh Kim, Sarah Visel, Benjamin P. Carow, and Kelly Turnbull	May 9, 2021 (Central and Eastern Europe)	April 10, 2021	1095–402	0.24
173	2	"Ben Gen 10"	A.J. Marchisello and Marcus Rinehart	Chelsea McAlarney, Johnny Vu, André LaMilza, John Martinez, Josh Kim, Sarah Visel, Benjamin P. Carow, and Kelly Turnbull	May 9, 2021 (Central and Eastern Europe)	April 10, 2021	1095–403	0.24
174	2	"Ben Gen 10"	A.J. Marchisello and Marcus Rinehart	Chelsea McAlarney, Johnny Vu, André LaMilza, John Martinez, Josh Kim, Sarah Visel, Benjamin P. Carow, and Kelly Turnbull	May 9, 2021 (Central and Eastern Europe)	April 10, 2021	1095–404H	0.24
In Washington, D.C., Ben meets a young Rex Salazar on the run from the Providence, who are looking to capture him as an asset. After a brief battle, Rex accidentally interferes with Ben's Omnitrix, causing the whole world to become infected with alien DNA. With Hex now under control of his newfound army, Ben and Rex must team up to stop Hex and undo the chaos they've unleashed.: Guest Starring: Vic Chao as Agent Six
175	3	"Alien X-Tinction"	A.J. Marchisello and Marcus Rinehart	Benjamin Lane, Johnny Vu, Chelsea McAlarney, André LaMilza, John Martinez, Josh Kim, and Sarah Visel	October 10, 2021 (Central and Eastern Europe)	April 11, 2021	1095–405	0.21
176	3	"Alien X-Tinction"	A.J. Marchisello and Marcus Rinehart	Benjamin Lane, Johnny Vu, Chelsea McAlarney, André LaMilza, John Martinez, Josh Kim, and Sarah Visel	October 10, 2021 (Central and Eastern Europe)	April 11, 2021	1095–406	0.21
177	3	"Alien X-Tinction"	A.J. Marchisello and Marcus Rinehart	Benjamin Lane, Johnny Vu, Chelsea McAlarney, André LaMilza, John Martinez, Josh Kim, and Sarah Visel	October 10, 2021 (Central and Eastern Europe)	April 11, 2021	1095–407	0.21
178	3	"Alien X-Tinction"	A.J. Marchisello and Marcus Rinehart	Benjamin Lane, Johnny Vu, Chelsea McAlarney, André LaMilza, John Martinez, Josh Kim, and Sarah Visel	October 10, 2021 (Central and Eastern Europe)	April 11, 2021	1095–408H	0.21
Team Tennyson is greeted by a mysterious alternate version of Max named Maximilian, who warns them of a mysterious foe known only as Alien X (later revealed to be an alternate Ben), who's sole goal is to collect every Omnitrix in the whole Omniverse. When Alien X takes Ben's Omnitrix, he enlists the help of alternate versions of himself as well as Gwen 10, to form an army to stop Alien X from succeeding in his plans.: Omnitrix (Alien Force) alien debuts: (by Alien Force Ben) Chromastone and Big Chill; Ultimatrix (Ultimate Alien) alien debuts: (by Ultimate Alien Ben) Ampfibian; Completed Omnitrix (Omniverse) alien debuts: (by Omniverse Ben) Bloxx; Omnitrix (Gwen 10) alien debuts: (by Gwen 10) Ripjaws; Omnitrix (Ben X) alien debuts: (by Ben X) Alien X

== Shorts ==
These were shown alongside airings of the series. Each short shows Ben transforming into an alien (usually more than once) to accomplish a task.

No.	Title	Original release date	Prod. code
1	"Upgrade 01"	January 8, 2017	1041–131
Ben tries to do a skateboard stunt using Upgrade, but crashes to the ground.
2	"Wildvine 01"	January 8, 2017	1041–129
Wildvine tries to dance with amusement park mascots and Gwen, but tangles them up in his vines.
3	"Diamondhead 01"	January 8, 2017	1041–120
Diamondhead tries dancing, and breaks a window.
4	"Cannonbolt 01"	January 9, 2017	1041–134
Ben tries to do the perfect cannonball using Cannonbolt!
5	"Heatblast 01"	January 11, 2017	1041–128
Ben uses Heatblast to cook popcorn and burns a hole in the tent.
6	"XLR8 01"	January 12, 2017	1041–135
XLR8 tries to make a new speed record, but turns back into Ben at the wrong moment.
7	"Four Arms 01"	January 13, 2017	1041–113
Ben uses Four Arms to win a jumping contest.
8	"Overflow 01"	January 13, 2017	1041–140
Overflow shows off at a national park, only to get hit by an orca.
9	"Grey Matter 01"	January 29, 2017	1041–101
Ben turns into Grey Matter to stop Grandpa Max´s snoring.
10	"Wildvine 02"	February 5, 2017	TBA
Ben makes a bet with Gwen that he cannot be hit by water balloons as Wildvine.
11	"Stinkfly 01"	February 12, 2017	1041–117
Stinkfly messes up using his powers.
12	"Overflow 02"	February 19, 2017	1041–125
Overflow blasts Grandpa Max off a slide and in the ocean.
13	"Upgrade 02"	April 13, 2017	1041–114
Upgrade upgrades the AC, and covers the RV in snow in the process.
14	"XLR8 02"	April 24, 2017	1041–132
XLR8 makes a bet with Gwen that he can reach a clock tower in 10 seconds.
15	"Cannonbolt 02"	May 2, 2017	1041–136
Cannonbolt gets stuck in the sand trying to do a stunt at the beach.
16	"Heatblast 02"	May 2, 2017	TBA
Ben does some epic burps using Heatblast!
17	"Four Arms 02"	May 25, 2017	1041–133
Four Arms shows off with armpit farts.
18	"Grey Matter 02"	May 25, 2017	TBA
Grey Matter shows he can fight at any size.
19	"Stinkfly 02"	May 26, 2017	TBA
Stinkfly plays a prank on Gwen and Max.
20	"Diamondhead 02"	June 20, 2017	TBA
Diamondhead and Gwen use the art of light refraction start a campfire... and burn off Grandpa Max's hair in the process.

=== Alien Worlds (2017–19) ===
Alien World, also known as Alien of the Week or Alien Time, are a series of shorts that were released during Wednesday, starting on August 2, 2017, on Ben 10's YouTube channel. These videos shows aliens Ben can transform into, their home planets, and culture. The shorts are narrated by the character Azmuth. There were 30 shorts produced.

No.	Title	Original release date	Prod. code
1	"Alien of the Week: Four Arms 1"	August 31, 2017	502–004–001
2	"Alien of the Week: Diamondhead 1"	August 31, 2017	502–004–002
3	"Alien of the Week: Heatblast 1"	August 31, 2017	502–004–003
4	"Alien of the Week: XLR8 1"	August 31, 2017	502–004–004
5	"Alien of the Week: Grey Matter 1"	August 31, 2017	502–004–005
6	"Alien of the Week: Upgrade"	August 31, 2017	502–004–007
7	"Alien of the Week: Cannonbolt 1"	August 31, 2017	502–004–009
8	"Alien of the Week: Wildvine 1"	August 31, 2017	502–004–008
9	"Alien of the Week: Overflow 1"	August 31, 2017	502–004–006
10	"Alien of the Week: Stinkfly 1"	August 31, 2017	502–004–010
11	"Alien of the Week: Diamondhead 2"	August 15, 2018	TBA
12	"Alien of the Week: Four Arms 2"	August 22, 2018	TBA
13	"Alien of the Week: Heatblast 2"	August 26, 2018	TBA
14	"Alien of the Week: XLR8 2"	August 29, 2018	TBA
15	"Alien of the Week: Grey Matter 2"	September 3, 2018	TBA
16	"Alien of the Week: Overflow 2"	September 9, 2018	TBA
17	"Alien of the Week: Shock Rock"	September 16, 2018	TBA
18	"Alien of the Week: Wildvine 2"	September 23, 2018	TBA
19	"Alien of the Week: Stinkfly 2"	September 30, 2018	TBA
20	"Alien of the Week: Cannonbolt 2"	October 7, 2018	TBA
21	"Alien of the Week: Four Arms vs Stinkfly"	September 28, 2019	TBA
22	"Alien of the Week: Diamondhead vs Shock Rock"	October 5, 2019	TBA
23	"Alien of the Week: Humungousaur vs Rath"	October 6, 2019	TBA
24	"Alien of the Week: Heatblast vs XLR8"	October 12, 2019	TBA
25	"Alien of the Week: Rath vs Diamondhead"	October 13, 2019	TBA
26	"Alien of the Week: XLR8 vs Cannonbolt"	October 19, 2019	TBA
27	"Alien of the Week: Slapback vs Heatblast"	October 20, 2019	TBA
28	"Alien of the Week: Shock Rock vs Four Arms"	November 3, 2019	TBA
29	"Alien of the Week: Cannonbolt vs Humungousaur"	November 13, 2019	TBA
30	"Alien of the Week: Stinkfly vs Slapback"	November 13, 2019	TBA
