= Salazar =

Salazar or Salasar may refer to:

== People and fictional characters ==
- Salazar (surname), a surname and list of persons and fictional characters with the surname
  - António de Oliveira Salazar (1889–1970), dictator of Portugal from 1932 to 1968
- Salazar Slytherin, a character in the Harry Potter novels

== Places ==
- Salazar, Burgos, Spain, a village
- Salazar de las Palmas, a municipality in the department of North Santander, Colombia
- Salazar Valley, a valley in the eastern part of the autonomous community of Navarre, Spain
- Salasar, Churu, Rajasthan, India, a town
  - Salasar Balaji Temple

== Aircraft ==
- Salazar, a de Havilland DH.88 Comet aircraft

== See also ==
- Trimeresurus salazar, a pit viper named after Salazar Slytherin
- Vila Salazar, former name for N'dalatando, town and commune in the province of Cuanza Norte, Angola
