= Hector Salazar =

Hector Salazar may refer to:

- Héctor Luis Palma Salazar (born 1940), former Mexican drug trafficker
- Hector Salazar (Law & Order), a detective from the short-lived Law & Order: Trial by Jury
- a character from Sons of Anarchy
- a character from the third season of 24

== See also ==
- Salazar (disambiguation)
