= Ben 10 Versus the Universe: The Movie =

American animated television film

- Promotional poster
- Based on: Ben 10 by Man of Action
- Written by: Benjamin Lane; Chelsea McAlarney; Johnny Vu; André LaMilza; John Martinez; Josh Kim; Sarah Visel; Benjamin P. Carow; Kelly Turnbull
- Story by: A.J. Marchisello; Marcus Rinehart; Tanner Marchisello
- Directed by: Henrique Jardim; John McIntyre
- Starring: Tara Strong; Montserrat Hernandez; David Kaye; Greg Cipes; Yuri Lowenthal; John DiMaggio; Roger Craig Smith; Daryl Sabara; Todd Haberkorn; Dee Bradley Baker; Tom Kenny; Josh Keaton
- Theme music composer: Andy Sturmer
- Composer: Kevin Manthei
- Country of origin: United States
- Original language: English

Production
- Executive producers: John Fang; Brian A. Miller; Jennifer Pelphrey; Rob Sorcher; Tramm Wigzell; For Man Of Action: Joe Casey; Joe Kelly; Duncan Rouleau; Steven T. Seagle
- Producers: Shareena Carlson; Will Patrick
- Running time: 72 minutes
- Production company: Cartoon Network Studios

Original release
- Network: Cartoon Network
- Release: October 10, 2020

Ben 10 Versus the Universe: The Movie is a 2020 American animated science fiction television film based on the 2016 Ben 10 series, which serves as a reboot of the 2005 TV series of the same name created by Man of Action. Directed by Henrique Jardim and John McIntyre and written by Benjamin Lane, Chelsea McAlarney, Johnny Vu, André LaMilza, John Martinez, Josh Kim, Sarah Visel, Benjamin P. Carow, and Kelly Turnbull, it stars Tara Strong, Montserrat Hernandez, David Kaye, John DiMaggio, Greg Cipes, and Yuri Lowenthal. The events of the film take place after the final episode of the series. In this film, Ben travels around space to stop an impact event that can lead Earth to total destruction.

A new Ben 10 film was officially announced by Cartoon Network in February 2020. The film's first trailer was shown on July 23, 2020, at San Diego Comic-Con at Home, a replacement for the 2020 edition, which was canceled due to the COVID-19 pandemic. It premiered on Cartoon Network on October 10, 2020, a day after the launch of a new video game called Ben 10: Power Trip.

== Plot ==
After foiling Steam Smythe's plan to destroy the telephone industry, Ben Tennyson feels like everything he does is getting repetitive and that there's no one left to give him a challenge. He, his cousin Gwen, and his grandfather Max suddenly get an urgent call from their friend Phil, who tells them that a meteor is heading towards Earth and threatens to destroy it. He also tells Ben that the key he used to unlock his Omni-Kix Armor is actually in reverse, and turning it into its proper lock could unlock an additional upgrade. Ben does so, unlocking the Omni-Naut Armor, an astronaut armor that enables him and his 10 aliens to fly and survive in space. Ben flies into space and attempts to stop the meteor, but enters a portal to another galaxy while the meteor crashes on Earth. It is revealed to be Vilgax, Ben's arch-nemesis who has escaped the Null Void and wants revenge against him.

After exiting the portal, Ben finds himself stranded in space and is abducted by the Incurseans, who believe him to be Vilgax. He tries to convince them otherwise, but is banished to the Null Void. He soon encounters alien criminals who try to take his Omnitrix but are stopped by Azmuth, a Galvan and the creator of the Omnitrix, who takes it from Ben. Ben tries to convince Azmuth to give the Omnitrix back so he can save his planet, but Azmuth refuses to do so until Ben tells him he is willing to rescue his planet even without the Omnitrix. In response, Azmuth agrees to give it back as long as he passes a trial first, which Ben accepts.

On Earth, the Tennysons and Phil try to find Ben but instead find Ben's arch-rival Kevin Levin, whose Antitrix is malfunctioning. They convince him to protect the Earth in Ben's absence in exchange for the Antitrix being repaired. Vilgax then arrives and fights Kevin, ultimately taking the Antitrix and becoming a hybrid of all of Kevin's 11 aliens known as Anti-Vilgax, who begins to xenoform the Earth.

Meanwhile, in the Null Void, Azmuth reveals his trial to Ben: he must pass through a large pipe with traps before the timer on his Omnitrix runs out. After numerous attempts fail, Azmuth tells Ben that all his usual tricks with the Omnitrix are keeping him from unlocking its true potential. As Ben tries to figure out what Azmuth's advice is about, two of the alien criminals attack him and try to take the Omnitrix. While they are fighting, a rift opens and begins sucking one of the criminals in while the other one abandons him. Ben tries to save him but is unable to do so until he figures out how to switch out the DNA pods in the Omnitrix and changes into a slimy alien dubbed Goop. He rescues the alien but fails to finish the trial. However, Azmuth tells him that by saving the alien, he has already proved himself worthy and he opens a portal to let him leave.

Ben sees the Incursean flagship getting sucked into a Null Void portal and helps them to safety, but passes out in the process. However, they rescue him after realizing that he is not Vilgax due to his acts of heroism and help him return to Earth, where he finds Vilgax and Kevin fighting. Vilgax overpowers them both and obtains Ben's Omni-Kix Key, becoming a cosmic entity named Alien V and killing Ben's Galvanic Mechamorph clone Glitch. Ben starts to lose faith once again until Azmuth, who manages to get out from Null Void, calls him using the Omnitrix and reminds Ben of what he learned during his trial in the Null Void. With his faith restored, Ben adds a new alien to his arsenal, a most powerful giant alien dubbed Way Big and manages to defeat Vilgax.

Azmuth and the Incurseans arrive as Azmuth uses the Omnitrix to repair the Earth and takes Vilgax into custody. The Tennyson family tries to find Kevin, who disappeared after the fight, while Phil recovers Glitch's remains in the hopes of rebuilding him. The Tennysons and Phil head to Nebraska for another vacation.

== Voice cast ==
- Tara Strong as Ben Tennyson, Glitch, Police Radio, Realtor
- Montserrat Hernandez as Gwen Tennyson
- David Kaye as Grandpa Max, Humungousaur, Azmuth, Fisherman, Piscciss Volann Prisoner, Shock Rock, Incursean #2
- John DiMaggio as Four Arms, Phil, Loboan Prisoner
- Greg Cipes as Kevin Levin (also as Bashmouth, Crystalfist, Rush, Hot Shot, Dark Matter, Quad Smack, and Bootleg)
- Yuri Lowenthal as Vilgax, Ectonurite Prisoner
- Roger Craig Smith as Emperor Milleous, Way Big, Steam Smythe, Computer, Cop 2, Diamondhead
- Daryl Sabara as Heatblast, Vulpimancer Prisoner
- Todd Haberkorn as Slapback, Tetrax Shard, Solar Twain, Man #1, Cop, Incursean
- Dee Bradley Baker as Jetray, Major Glorff, Cop #1, Opticoid Prisoner, Rath, Goop
- Tom Kenny as Polar Twain
- Josh Keaton as XLR8

== Production ==
In February 2020, Cartoon Network officially announced that a new Ben 10 film would be in production.

== Release ==
=== Television ===
Ben 10 Versus the Universe: The Movie premiered on Cartoon Network channels around the world on October 10, 2020.

=== Home media ===
Ben 10 Versus the Universe: The Movie was also released digitally on October 11, 2020, one day after the film's official premiere, and was also released on DVD on October 27, 2020, by Warner Bros. Home Entertainment.

=== Theatrical ===
It also received a theatrical release in the United Arab Emirates.

== Reception ==
=== Box office ===
The film was released theatrically in the United Arab Emirates. As of 26 November 2020, it had grossed $50,743.

== Soundtrack ==
Ben 10 Versus the Universe: The Movie's soundtrack was composed by Kevin Manthei and was also released on SoundCloud.
