= Carlos Salazar =

Carlos Salazar may refer to:

== Arts and entertainment ==
- Carlos Salazar Herrera (1906–1980), Costa Rican writer
- Carlos Salazar (actor) (1930–2022), Filipino actor

== Politicians ==
- Carlos Salazar Castro (1800–1867), chief of state of El Salvador and Guatemala
- Carlos Salazar (Argentine politician), senator for Tucumán Province from 2007 to 2009

== Sportspeople ==
- Carlos Salazar (Venezuelan footballer) (born 1989)
- Carlos Gabriel Salazar (born 1964), Argentine boxer
- Carlos Salazar (Colombian footballer) (born 1981)

== Other ==
- Carlos Salazar Lomelín (born 1951), Mexican businessman
- Carlos Enrique Salazar, Guatemalan chess master
