= Salasar, Churu =

Village in Churu district, Rajasthan, India

Salasar
- village
- Location in Rajasthan, India Salasar (India)
- Coordinates: 27.7251741°N 74.7232173°E
- Country: India
- State: Rajasthan
- District: Churu
- Tehsil: Sujangarh

Population (2011)
  - Total: 5,914

Languages
- Time zone: UTC+5:30 (IST)
- PIN: 331506

Salasar is a village in the Sujangarh tehsil in Churu district of Rajasthan, India. It is known for the Salasar Balaji Temple.

Salasar belongs to Bikaner division of Rajasthan. It is located 79 km south of the district headquarters Churu, 27 km from Sujangarh and 164 km from the state capital Jaipur.

Total population of the village is 5914, in 959 houses. The female population is 48.6%, while the overall literacy rate is 68.0% and the female literacy rate is 29.9%.
