= Salazar, Burgos =

Salazar
- Location within Spain
- Coordinates: 42°58′37″N 3°37′5″W
- Country: Spain
- Autonomous community: Castile and León
- Province: Burgos
- Comarca: Las Merindades
- Municipality: Villarcayo de Merindad de Castilla la Vieja
- Elevation: 664 m (2,178 ft)

Population (2010)
  - Total: 53
- Time zone: UTC+1 (CET)
  - Summer (DST): UTC+2 (CEST)
- Postal Code: 09550
- Climate: Csb

Salazar is a locality in the municipality of Villarcayo de Merindad de Castilla la Vieja, in the comarca of Las Merindades, in the province of Burgos, in the autonomous community of Castile and León, Spain.
