= David Salazar =

David Salazar may refer to:

- David Salazar (footballer, born 1991), Mexican footballer for Club América Premier
- David Salazar (footballer, born 1999), Chilean footballer for O'Higgins
- David Salazar (politician), Peruvian politician
- David Shawty, American rapper
