= List of Generator Rex characters =

The following is list of characters that appear in the 2010 animated series Generator Rex.

== Main characters ==
=== Rex Salazar ===
Rex Salazar (voiced by Daryl Sabara) is a teenage (sixteen in Season 1) half-Argentinean, half-Mexican E.V.O born to a family of scientists. Unlike other E.V.O.s, Rex can control his nanites at will, allowing him to appear human and cure other E.V.O.s of their mutations. He can also use his nanites to create various machines on his body and communicate with and manipulate technology. After being injected with the specialized Omega-1 Nanite, he gains the ability to create stronger and more effective machinery with unique properties. He also becomes strong enough to cure animals of nanites and detect Breach's presence. His girlfriend is a siren-like E.V.O. named Circe, who originally worked for Van Kleiss, but defected after realizing that he desired Rex "alive" in body only. She then joins his E.V.O. gang in Hong Kong. According to Van Kleiss, he inherited his late mother Violetta's headstrong nature.

After being sent six months into the future as a result of Breach's newfound time-traveling ability, Rex fights against Providence's new boss, the power-mad Black Knight, to stop her and the Consortium from attaining godhood from the five nanites called "Meta Nanites" ("Master-Control Nanites"). He alone can fully control them in their purest state, as his late parents had secretly programmed them to fully work for him. He is now dating Circe, as their romantic relationship is revealed to be genuine in "Assault on Abysus". After the events of the finale, he enters a full romance with her, and is the only E.V.O. left to defend the world from further threats.

Throughout the series, Rex has full access to six of his original orange-colored "builds": the "Smack Hands", a pair of box-shaped gauntlets capable of individually spinning like a boring drill; the "BFS" (short for "Big Freaking Sword"), a gigantic sword with an alternate function that turns the upper half of the blade into a high-speed circular sawblade; the "Slam Cannon", a cannon with a compactor maw on its back that extracts raw materials as ammunition for the cannon to be fired; the "Boogie Pack", a pair of vertical-launching VTOL wings that can fire either a pair of bolas or grappling tethers from the top of the fans; the "Punk Buster", a pair of giant spiked boots with a built-in hydraulic piston that boosts his kicking and jumping power; and the "Rex Ride", a hover motorbike with a retractable battering ram in place of an engine block that can be used like a shield to break through trees and incredibly thick walls. Upon awakening his Omega-1 Nanite, he then gain access to five additional cyan-colored energy-based "builds": the "Blast Caster", a large, extendable tentacle-like whip capable of channel large amounts of electricity via the electric generator on his back; the "Funchucks", a pair of giant, metallic nunchaku that are able to be spun at high speeds and use them to generate a destructive energy pulse by slamming them together after spinning them, allowing him to shoot a light blue arc of energy at his enemies; the "Bad Axes", a pair of giant axes with energized blades capable of slicing through the thickest of metal; the "Block Party", a pair of metallic gauntlets that generates blue energy shields made of highly energized atoms; and the "Sky Slyder", a large hoverboard capable of flying at high-speeds.

=== Agent Six ===
Agent Six (voiced by Wally Kurth) is a senior Providence agent and Rex's handler, whose name comes from the fact he is the sixth most dangerous person on the planet. Because of his strict and by-the-book personality, Rex refers to him as a "nanny, just more aggro". Over time, Six falls in love with Dr. Rebecca Holiday, confessing his feelings for her in "A Family Holiday". Despite losing six years of his memory in "Six Minus Six", he seemingly regains his feelings for her.

=== Bobo Haha ===
Bobo Haha (voiced by John DiMaggio) is an E.V.O. chimpanzee with the ability to speak, who is Rex's sidekick and friend. He wears an eye patch and fez. Bobo claims that before becoming an E.V.O., he was a helper animal trained to entertain children at a hospital, whose owner was an eccentric philanthropist.

=== Dr. Rebecca Holiday ===
Dr. Rebecca Holiday (voiced by Grey DeLisle) is the lead scientist for Providence and expert in nanotechnology. Along with Agent Six, she is responsible for taking care of Rex and takes her job seriously, acting as a surrogate mother for him. Rex had a school boy crush on her until her age appropriate sister was cured. She also harbors a crush on Six, which he grows to reciprocate in "A Family Holiday" and starts to recall in "Riddle of the Sphinx" after losing his memories in "Six Minus Six."

=== Noah Nixon ===
Noah Nixon (voiced by Fred Savage) is a human and Rex's best friend. He is an agent sent by White Knight to befriend Rex and subtly influence his decisions to make him more compliant. Noah eventually reveals to Rex his status as a covert agent, and despite this they became friends on open terms. His girlfriend is his high school classmate Claire Bowman.

=== White Knight ===
White Knight (voiced by J. K. Simmons) is the leader of Providence and the only known nanite-free being on the planet. He almost always stays in his office, communicating his orders through two-way screens. He has a fear of nanites, as he does not want to touch or be near E.V.O.s out of fear they will infect him with nanites. Because of this, in the third season he dons a nanite-free battle suit.

== Villains ==
=== Van Kleiss ===
Van Kleiss (voiced by Troy Baker) is the primary antagonist of the show, a British scientist who specializes in biointerface and biomechanical integration. He expresses insanity to mask his evil and ambitious nature until he can fulfill his goal of absorbing the five Meta Nanites to attain godly abilities. In the past, he was responsible for the deaths of Cesar and Rex's parents, Rafael and Violetta, by trapping them inside as the nanite reactor exploded. He appears to know about Rex and his forgotten past, and that Rex's older brother Cesar seemingly caused the nanite incident five years prior. He saw the Nanite Event as the dawn of a new golden age for evolved humankind, and seeks to create a planet populated by E.V.O.s. regardless of their weakness or frailties. Like Rex, he is able to control his nanites, but his mutation is unstable and requires a constant supply of fresh nanites for survival by extracting them from other E.V.O.s., who are petrified in the process. Upon acquiring Rex's batch of fully programmed original nanites, he gains the ability to create and control E.V.O.s, a mutation which becomes permanent if not cured by Rex in less than an hour. After Breach's portal-making ability is increased by the amp pack he made for her, he is sent to the ancient past, where he was present in the primitive eras of Egypt and met Emperor Septimius Severus. He managed to create an Egyptian E.V.O. called Gharun Set in a makeshift laboratory, then preserved himself in a chamber that stored his unstable nanites and ensured he was able to survive to the present. After being defeated, his golden gauntlet is destroyed and he is taken to Breach's pocket dimension of Greenville, Ohio.

=== The Pack ===
The Pack is a group of E.V.O.s that serve Van Kleiss. Its known members include the following:

==== Biowulf ====
Biowulf (voiced by Troy Baker) is a blue-armored, white-haired, wolf-like E.V.O. who is fiercely loyal to Van Kleiss, whom he calls "master." Owing to Van Kleiss' powers being limited to his native soil in early episodes, Biowulf initially acts as the Pack's de facto leader in the field.

==== Skalamander ====
Skalamander (voiced by John DiMaggio) is a lizard-like E.V.O. with crystal spikes growing out of his body and a crystal club growing out of his left arm.

=== ZAG-RS ===
ZAG-RS (voiced by Grey DeLisle) is a sentient artificial intelligence/multi-agent system who aims to destroy the nanite infestation of Earth, which will destroy all of humanity in the process. Its origin and motives are initially a mystery, but it is able to exert control over nanites at hort ranges. It makes several attempts to achieve its goal, but Rex stops it each time. Its feminine voice was modeled after the deceased Mexican scientist Violetta Salazar's, as its inventor, a teenage Dr. Cesar Salazar, wanted it to have a voice that represented safety, protection and caring; the feelings of a loving mother.

=== Agent Weaver ===
Agent Weaver (voiced by Troy Baker) is a former member of Providence stationed at the arctic "Paradise" base, where he was the chief technician. He and his crew are later revealed to be traitors reactivating and selling nanites to Van Kleiss.

=== Hunter Cain ===
Hunter Cain (voiced initially by John Cena; later by John DiMaggio) is an E.V.O. hunter who despises all E.V.O.s, having previously become insane after his wife became an E.V.O. He uses a weapon loaded with special bullets that forces Nanites to self-destruct, instantly vaporizing E.V.O.s.

=== NoFace ===
NoFace (voiced by Fred Tatasciore) is a powerful, faceless E.V.O. with the ability to communicate with intelligent E.V.O.s and control less intelligent ones. During the nanite event, the Gulf Stream funneled a huge amount of active nanites into Kyiv, transforming most of its inhabitants into powerful E.V.O.s, including their current leader, NoFace.

=== Quarry ===
Quarry (voiced by Mark Hamill) is an E.V.O. crime lord made of rock. He hunts down and forces E.V.O.s such as Tuck, Skwydd, and Cricket to work for him through having gathered a massive criminal empire. In "Rabble", he learns of Rex's return from his enforcer Knuckles after Rex drains him of his nanites, forcing Quarry to dispose of him. He reappears in "Hard Target", when Breach releases him, but he ends up being taken to Abysus and tortured by Van Kleiss. His final appearance is in "Remote Control", where he mind-controls Sqwydd, Tuck and Cricket using Providence's EVO control collars, ordering them to attack Rex. He is ultimately defeated by Rex and his body is blown apart, leaving only his head behind.

=== Gatlocke ===
Gatlocke (voiced by Greg Ellis) is a British cyborg and the a leader of a group of modern-day pirates known as "The Anarchists", who debut in "Badlands." He eventually makes his second and final appearance in "Enemies Mine", where he tries to take out Rex once and for all by teaming up with Hunter Cain, NoFace and Valve. Their fates are unknown since they were trapped inside a shield made by Rex's surplus nanites at the Purgatory Base.

=== Black Knight ===
Black Knight (voiced by Jennifer Hale) is the next leader of Providence after White Knight rebels against his superiors in the Consortium. After taking over Providence, she starts to run things differently from how White Knight had, as she believes in controlling the incurable E.V.O.s rather than trying to cure them. She secretly attempts to become a almighty goddess by attaining all five Meta Nanites for herself, turning on her own superiors in the process. She is eventually captured off-screen.

=== Valve ===
Valve (voiced by Maurice LaMarche) is a samurai-styled biker and a dealer of an altered form of nanites which can link a person to technology. He makes his second and final appearance in "Enemies Mine", where he tries to take out Rex once and for all by aligning himself with Hunter Cain, NoFace and Gatlocke. Their fates are unknown since they were trapped inside a shield made by Rex's surplus nanites at the Purgatory Base.

=== Gharun Set ===
Gharun Set (voiced by Hakeem Kae-Kazim) is an ancient Egyptian E.V.O. created by Van Kleiss after Breach's powers sent him back in time to ancient Egypt. After creating a nanite production chamber, Kleiss infuses Set with nanites, transforming him into a dog-headed mummy-like humanoid with an eye in the center of his chest.

=== The Consortium ===
The Consortium is a powerful organization which supports Providence and are the superiors of Black Knight. Little is known about them, but they seem to provide funding for Providence and the Nanite Project. In six years, they managed to merge with four of the five Meta Nanites, turning into biomechanical robots with powers such as teleportation, pyrokinesis, cryokinesis, and electromagnetic-controlling abilities.

==== Reddick ====
Reddick (voiced by Robin Atkin Downes) is a real estate agent and construction associate who is a member of the Consortium. When merged with a Meta-Nanite, he was transformed into a giant gray robotic E.V.O. with the ability to control gravity and fly.

==== Roswell ====
Roswell (voiced by Troy Baker) is a southern businessman and oil and mineral associate who is a member of the Consortium. When merged with the Meta-Nanite, he was transformed into an E.V.O. with the ability to control fire and ice.

==== Sir Anthony Haden-Scott ====
Sir Anthony Haden-Scott (voiced by Robin Atkin Downes) is a British worldwide media associate and a member of the Consortium. When merged with the Meta-Nanite, he was transformed into an E.V.O. with the ability to manipulate matter and energy and fly.

==== Xanubian ====
Xanubian is an African American arms dealer and shipping industry associate who is a member of the Consortium. When merged with a Meta-Nanite, he was transformed into a tall and thin robotic E.V.O with green armor and the ability to manipulate time and space. Unlike the others, he is mute, although Roswell calls him a chatterbox.

==== Vostok ====
Vostok (voiced by John DiMaggio) was a black market financier and KGB operative who is a member of the Consortium. He was with the Consortium when Black Knight began her plans to restart the Nanite project. Vostok had some doubts about her plot, and so she killed Vostok when they were alone, telling the other Consortium members that the enemy was responsible for Vostok's death.

=== Alpha ===
Alpha (voiced by Michael Emerson) was created by Caesar to control other nanites as a sentient being, with power equivalent to the Omega Nanite/fifth Meta Nanite within Rex's body. Since his energy/nanite body was unsustainable. he tried to make mechanical bodies to sustain himself. But after this plan failed, he tried to use organic beings as hosts, resulting in Ben entering the world of Generator Rex and causing the events of Heroes United. He is ultimately taken back to the Null Void by Ben (in the form of Upchuck), but escapes his prison as the Omega Nanite is re-injected inside Rex.

== Supporting characters ==
=== Diane Farrah ===
Diane Farrah (voiced by Grey DeLisle) is a newswoman who hosts a news program called "Ultimate Exposure". She appears regularly where Providence fights EV.O.s, as a hostess of her program or when she is interviewing people involved with E.V.O.s.

=== Breach ===
Breach (voiced by Hynden Walch) is a four-armed human E.V.O. Using her larger arms, Breach can tear open space and time, creating red wormholes which turn golden after her spatial abilities were boosted by Van Kleiss' amp pack. Her own personal place is Greenville, Ohio, which she absorbed into a portal and keeps as her own dollhouse to stay sane. Breach takes Biowulf, Skalamander and Van Kleiss to Greenville as Rex uses the God Code to cure all EV.O.s.

=== Circe ===
Circe (voiced by Tara Sands) is a humanoid teenage E.V.O. with sound-based abilities and the ability to lure fellow E.V.O.s like a siren's song. She debuts in the third episode, "Beyond the Sea", where she and Rex begin to feel a powerful connection form between them, though she still chose the Pack over staying with Rex, as she did not trust Providence's methods. She meets Rex again during her first mission as Van Kleiss' subordinate in "Leader of the Pack", where she hesitantly knocks Rex unconscious and imprisons him, despite being reluctant to resort to hurting him to help Van Kleiss.

Circe's second and final mission with the Pack is in the Bug Jar when she discovers, to her horror, that Van Kleiss is more interested in what Rex's body would give him and does not care about what could happen to his psyche. After this, she leaves to join her husband's old friends in Hong Kong and develops a close friendship with Skwydd, which she assures Rex is platonic. In "Endgame", after being cured along with the rest of humanity, she embraces Rex and assures him she is "normal but okay" and jokingly says he had "put himself out of a job" by curing the world. It is later confirmed that they are dating as Rex continues to act as the planet's defender.

=== Claire Bowman ===
Claire Bowman (voiced by Danica McKellar) is a girl who Noah likes since she is the most popular girl in high school. She is best friends with a clumsy teenage girl named Annie. She debuts in "Operation: Wingman", where she agrees to go to the prom with Noah if he finds Annie a date. She also appears in "Haunted", in which she meets Rex's elder brother Cesar and is impressed with his intelligence.

In "Guy Vs. Guy", she goes on another date with Noah while he and Rex were going all-out on a prank war that ended up endangering the entire city when Bobo Haha got involved. She makes her final appearance in "Hermanos," where she and Annie go with Noah and Rex to Argentina to see the ancestral ranch that Rex inherited upon the death of his father Rafael, as a birthday present from Noah.

=== Annie ===
Annie (voiced by Felicia Day) is a good friend of Claire Bowman, who struggled to find a date for junior prom because of her clumsiness. Noah persuades Rex to come to the prom as his "wingman" and take Annie out as well. Since then, Annie has double dated with Rex several times. At the end of "Hermanos", Rex states that she, Claire, and Noah are his true companions and he considers them as his family as much as Six, Bobo and Dr. Holiday are.

=== Rex's Old E.V.O. Street Gang ===
An E.V.O. street gang that has lived in Hong Kong, China since the Nanite Event. It is later revealed that when he was younger, Rex was the gang's leader before he lost his memory and joined Providence after Agent Six found him. There were others but had successfully been cured by Rex.

==== Tuck ====
Tuck (voiced by Dante Basco) is a red-eyed mummy-like E.V.O. who befriended a young Rex in Hong Kong, China, in the five years after the Nanite Event. He is best friends with Skwydd and Cricket, and followed Rex as their leader even when encountering the shapeshifting E.V.O. John Scarecrow during their adventures.

==== Skwydd ====
Skwydd (voiced by Jason Marsden) is a humanoid squid-like E.V.O. who is serious, giving Rex serious/obvious answers when he jokes around. He is also shown to be moody and stoic, something that Rex jokes about. Skwydd has an interest in entertaining people as a freak show act.

In "Hard Target", Rex assumes that he and Circe are dating, but is relieved after he assures Rex that they are just friends. In "Remote Control", he ends up under Quarry's control after being collared by New Providence, but is ultimately cured in "Endgame".

==== Cricket ====
Cricket (voiced by Vyvan Pham) is a cricket-like E.V.O. who is the only female member of Rex's street gang and formerly had a crush on him. She becomes good friends with fellow E.V.O. Circe, having another girl to "even out the boy-girl ratio" and do her hair and nails with every weekend. She is ultimately cured by Rex's nanite-powered godly abilities in "Endgame".

=== Rex's Family ===
==== Dr. Rafael Salazar ====
Rafael Salazar (voiced by Carlos Alazraqui) is Rex's father. Originally from Buenos Aires, he worked on the original Nanite Project with his wife Violet and their teenage son Cesar. After settling down in Geneva, he became a father to his youngest son, Rex. Rafael and Violet were killed during the Nanite Event after Van Kleiss trapped them inside the lab harboring the unstable nanite reactor.

==== Dr. Violet Salazar ====
Violet Salazar (voiced by Grey DeLisle) is Rex's mother. She was from Mexico City, Mexico, where she, Rafael, and their young sons spent their summers at a local town run by a woman they considered an abuela regardless of blood ties, where a young Rex had befriended Frederico. She traveled all over the world with Rafael and Cesar, but settled down after giving birth to Rex in Geneva. Violet and Rafael were killed during the Nanite Event after Van Kleiss trapped them inside the lab harboring the unstable nanite reactor.

==== Dr. Cesar Salazar ====
Cesar Salazar (voiced by Freddy Rodriguez) is Rex's long-lost Argentinian/Mexican older brother in his late twenties and one of the surviving scientists of the Nanite Project alongside Dr. Peter Meecham, Van Kleiss. and Dr. Gabriel Rylander, who he managed to partially return to life. Alongside his parents, he secretly programmed the five Meta Nanites to obey only Rex, with the fifth and strongest one being injected into fifteen-year-old Rex by Rylander, who was killed alongside Van Kleiss one year ago. In the six months after Rex's sudden "disappearance", Cesar had kept his cover in giving the all-powerful God Code to his younger brother, even if it meant appearing as an unfeeling enemy in his eyes. It is later revealed he was merely playing along with the Consortium and Black Knight's schemes for world domination for Rex to acquire five the Meta Nanites' abilities at their fullest.

== Side characters ==
=== Ben Tennyson ===
Ben Tennyson (voiced by Yuri Lowenthal) is a sixteen-year-old teenager who wields the Ultimatrix, formerly the Omnitrix, which allows him to transform into aliens. In Heroes United, he arrives in Rex's world through a space-time rift in the Null Void and helps him battle Alpha. Ultimately, he returns Alpha to its interdimensional prison in the form of Upchuck.

==== Humungousaur ====
Humungousaur (voiced by Dee Bradley Baker) is a Vaxasaurian, a large brown dinosaur-like alien that possesses incredible strength and can grow in size and become stronger.

==== Diamondhead ====
Diamondhead (voiced by Dee Bradley Baker) is a Petrosapien, an alien with crystalline features that can grow and manipulate diamond-hard crystals at will. He is also able to reshape his limbs, such as turning his arm into a sharp blade, as well as firing crystal projectiles.

==== Lodestar ====
Lodestar (voiced by Dee Bradley Baker) is a Biot-savartian, an alien with a floating metal head in between two sharp shoulders that act as a magnetic field. He has crab-like claws and a body that is mainly black, with yellow feet, hands, shoulders and chest. He possesses the power to control magnetic forces and manipulate metals and other magnetic objects.

==== Rath ====
Rath (voiced by John DiMaggio) is an Appoplexian, a tiger-like alien with high arrogance and aggressiveness. He can retract two short blades from behind his knuckles to enhance his punches.

==== Big Chill ====
Big Chill (voiced by Dee Bradley Baker) is a Necrofriggian, an asexual humanoid moth-like alien whose wings and antenna can fold up into a hooded robe. He has a black body with blue and white spots which resemble ice chunks on his limbs. He has the ability to exhale freezing vapor that can encase his targets in ice and the ability to become intangible, which he can combine to freeze objects he passes through.

==== Cannonbolt ====
Cannonbolt (voiced by Dee Bradley Baker) is an Arburian Pelarota, a round alien with a hard shell who can curl into a ball to move quickly. His body is mostly colored white with black stripes.

==== XLR8 ====
XLR8 (voiced by Yuri Lowenthal) is a Kineceleran from the planet Kinet who has the ability to move at high speeds. He has a black body with a blue striped tail and a spiked helmet with a blue visor; as well, he has wheels on his feet.

==== Four Arms ====
Four Arms (voiced by Dee Bradley Baker) is a Tetramand, a four-armed, red alien with superhuman strength. He wears gold gauntlets on his arms and long black pants with a gold belt.

==== Shocksquatch ====
Shocksquatch (voiced by David Kaye) is a Gimlinopithecus from the planet Pattersonea. He resembles a yeti and can manipulate and emit electricity.

==== Upgrade ====
Upgrade (voiced by Yuri Lowenthal) is a Galvanic Mechamorph, a humanoid alien with black skin and green mechanical prints throughout his body. He possesses the ability to manipulate, possess, and enhance technology.

==== Upchuck ====
Upchuck (voiced by Dee Bradley Baker) is a Gourmand, a reptilian-like being who can digest and then expel energy and solid matter. Ben uses him to carry Alpha's compressed sphere into the Null Void.

=== Gwen Tennyson ===
Gwen Tennyson (voiced by Ashley Johnson) is Ben's cousin, who possesses powerful magic abilities, in part due to her alien Anodite heritage. She accompanies Ben and Kevin to Japan, where Ben makes a commercial for Mr. Smoothy. Upon meeting Rex, she is seemingly impressed by what Ben tells her about his abilities. She later opens a portal to Rex's universe for him and Bobo to return home.

=== Max Tennyson ===
Max Tennyson (voiced by Paul Eiding) is the paternal grandfather of Ben and Gwen. Despite his age, he has shown on multiple occasions to be a formidable fighter. He was once in the United States Army, an astronaut program, and was a Plumber. Before Ben got the Omnitrix, Max tried to keep the Plumbers and the aliens a secret from his family because he wanted to protect them. However, his plan failed when the Omnitrix and Vilgax came to Earth.

=== Kevin Levin ===
Kevin Levin (voiced by Greg Cipes) is Ben's friend and rival, a reformed criminal with the ability to absorb the properties of matter, energy, and DNA through touch. He is able to adapt solid matter to his body and make it "armor" that protects him and enhances his strength. In addition, he is capable of transforming his hands into any weapon with the absorbed material.

=== Beverly Holiday ===
Beverly Holiday (voiced by Jennifer Stone) is Dr. Holiday's younger sister, who turned into a spider-like E.V.O. when she was thirteen. She is kept in "The Hold", a containment area meant to hold the most dangerous creatures of the Petting Zoo.

=== Peter Meechum ===
Peter Meechum (voiced initially by Jeff Bennett; later Wil Wheaton) is a man who was turned into a zombie-like E.V.O. with an exposed human body and a blob-shaped head on top, with his actual head in the other head's mouth. In this form, he had the ability to turn anyone he touches that have nanites in them into zombie-like creatures that obey him.

=== Dr. Gabriel Rylander ===
Dr. Gabriel Rylander (voiced by Brent Spiner) is a scientist who worked on the Nanite Project with Rex's parents and other scientists. He was one of the original Nanite Project scientists, and wanted to change the Earth by using nanites to end starvation and disease. After an accident, he took part in Rex's nanite treatment.

=== Kenwyn Jones ===
Kenwyn Jones (voiced by Rutina Wesley) is a former Providence cadet. Providence was responsible for saving her family, and she later joined them because she wanted to repay her debt to them. The experience seemed to have a profound effect on her, causing her to take her training seriously.

=== The Six ===
The Six are a group of mercenaries consisting of the six most dangerous people on Earth; Six was one of them. Each member's name goes by how dangerous they are. As noted by Six, the ranking focuses on how dangerous they are, which in turn is determined by skill level and personality.

==== One ====
One (voiced by Frank Welker) was the most dangerous man on the planet and the leader of the Six. One was one of the first people to be transformed into an E.V.O. after the Nanite Event and was imprisoned on an isolated island for his own safety.

==== Dos ====
Dos (voiced by Carlos Alazraqui) is an elderly Spanish gentleman and the second most dangerous man on Earth.

==== Trey ====
Trey (voiced by Jim Cummings) is a large man with a Cajun accent who is the third most dangerous man on Earth. He is physically the strongest of The Six.

==== IV ====
IV (voiced by Frank Welker) is a mummy-like mercenary who is the fourth most dangerous man on Earth. He has bandages covering his body that he uses as weapons and is seemingly able to control. He can use them to bind opponents and aid himself.

==== Five ====
Five (voiced by Olivia d'Abo) is an English rocker girl with pink hair and a Cockney accent, who is the fifth most dangerous person on Earth.

=== Fitzy Feakins ===
Fitzy Feakins (voiced by Tom Kenny) is a human E.V.O. who is urgently wanted by Providence for his E.V.O. powers.
