= All Washed Up (disambiguation) =

All Washed Up is a 2025 studio album released by American rock band Cheap Trick.

All Washed Up may also refer to:

== Music ==
- All Washed Up, 1979 album by Les McKeown
- "All Washed Up", a song by The Urge from Receiving the Gift of Flavor
- All Washed Up, a 2002 EP by The Hot Puppies

== Television ==
- "All Washed Up", an episode of Alvinnn!!! and the Chipmunks
- "All Washed Up", an episode of Doc McStuffins
- "All Washed Up", an episode of Secret Life of Toys
- "All Washed Up", an episode of Betsy's Kindergarten Adventures

== Other arts and entertainment ==
- "Case 4: All Washed Up", a sequence in the video game CSI: Fatal Conspiracy
- All Washed Up, working title of the 1982 film Ladies and Gentlemen, The Fabulous Stains and title song of the soundtrack

== See also ==
- Washed Up!, a 1993 EP by Catch 22, re-released as an album with additional tracks in 1999
