= List of Alvinnn!!! and the Chipmunks episodes =

Alvinnn!!! and the Chipmunks is a 2015 animated television series featuring The Chipmunks, produced by Bagdasarian Productions in association with Technicolor Animation Productions. It is an update to the 1983 animated show of the same name.

== Series overview ==
Season	Episodes	Originally released	
Season	Episodes	First released	Last released
1	26	March 30, 2015 (France); August 3, 2015 (U.S.)	November 13, 2015 (France); March 8, 2016 (U.S.)
2	26	November 16, 2015 (France); March 9, 2016 (U.S.)	October 3, 2017 (France); June 3, 2017 (U.S)
3	26	April 6, 2018 (France); June 10, 2017 (U.S.)	March 1, 2019 (France); June 19, 2019 (U.S.)
4	26	August 26, 2019 (France); June 20, 2019 (U.S.)	May 11, 2021 (France); February 22, 2021 (U.S.)
5	26	August 23, 2021 (France); February 23, 2021 (U.S.)	December 1, 2022 (France); March 4, 2023 (U.S.)

== Episodes ==
=== Season 1 (2015) ===
No. overall	No. in season	Title	Written by	France air date	U.S. air date	Prod. code	U.S. viewers (millions)
1a	1a	"Talking Teddy"	Janice Karman & Michael Bagdasarian	30 March 2015	August 3, 2015	101A	2.27
When Theodore gets to pick the TV show, his bear recommends Talking Teddy TV Fun Time. Unable to stand any more of the bear, Alvin convinces Simon to do something about it, so Simon comes up with the idea to program it to obey Alvin with the help of a keyboard that he created. The next night, Theodore seems a little upset by the change in his Teddy. While Alvin abuses his control of the bear, Simon tries to dampen Alvin's actions. After Simon wants to end the charade, Alvin steals the keyboard, hides it, and continues to take advantage of Theodore, much to Simon's displeasure. Finally Simon, unable to stand it any more, rewires the bear once more in order to teach Alvin a lesson. Once he succeeds in freaking out Alvin, Simon convinces Theodore to donate Teddy to a daycare program. In the end, Theodore returns with a new and improved Talking Teddy.
1b	1b	"Principal Interest"	Janice Karman	31 March 2015	August 3, 2015	101B	2.27
The Chipmunks' new school year starts, and Alvin immediately develops a crush on the new principal. However, to get past the principal's assistant, who is none other than Brittany, the leader of the Chipettes, Alvin misbehaves on purpose and throws his classes into chaos in order to get summoned to her office. Tired of his attentions, the principal suspends him, but once home Alvin drives Dave crazy, who then meets with the principal to beg her to take Alvin back. Alvin sneaks in, believing that they are going on a date, only to discover that the principal is already married to another man.
2a	2a	"A is for Alien"	Janice Karman & Michael Bagdasarian	1 April 2015	August 4, 2015	102A	2.20
After Alvin spots Brittany having suspicious behavior and various weird occurrences in the school's basement, Alvin starts to believe that aliens have taken over the place. Managing to transmit his paranoia to Simon, circumstances lead them to believe that Theodore was abducted by the aliens. They go to the school at night in special gear designed by Simon to rescue Theodore, but ultimately in the end uncover the truth: the school is simply being used as a movie set for a science fiction movie.
2b	2b	"Jeanette Enchanted"	Janice Karman & Vanessa Bagdasarian	2 April 2015	August 4, 2015	102B	2.20
Jeanette refuses to celebrate her birthday, as when she was younger she believed magic to be real and has grown disenchanted with life since discovering that it was not the case. To cheer her up, the Chipmunks make her believe that they offered her a magic wand, but things get out of hand and Alvin ultimately tells her that it is not real. However, touched by her friends' efforts, she now considers that they are what makes her life magical.
3a	3a	"Sister Act"	Peter Saisselin	3 April 2015	August 5, 2015	103A	2.09
Eleanor has a fallout with Brittany and moves in with the boys. Initially, only Alvin is hostile to Eleanor's invasion, but when Jeanette arrives too for the same reason, the Chipmunks decide to move in with Brittany and freak her out until she agrees to talk to her sisters, who all apologize to each other. As they are about to leave Dave and the boys' house, however, Alvin asks what the dispute was all about, and start bickering again.
3b	3b	"Lil' T"	Janice Karman & Michael Bagdasarian	4 May 2015	August 5, 2015	103B	2.09
As he does not manage to convince Alvin to listen to his new rap song, Theodore uploads it on the Web and it goes viral. Soon, he is signed for a solo career under the name Lil' T. However, Alvin and the others miss him, so they go find him and apologize just as he is about to go on tour with his new rapper friend Biggy Large. Once back home, they all perform and record one of Theodore's compositions with the Chipettes.
4a	4a	"What a Gem"	Janice Karman & Michael Bagdasarian	6 April 2015	August 6, 2015	104A	2.16
Alvin's imagination runs wild again and he starts believing his neighbor, the elderly Ms. Croner, to be a jewel thief. Because of his broken leg, he has to resort to complicated tricks to investigate (including manipulating his brothers) but they ultimately discover that she is cheating to win a gardening competition. The next day Alvin goes to Ms. Croner's house and he gives her a rose bush to show that he is sorry for accusing her of being a jewel thief and that he found a gem that actually belonged to her mother's wedding ring. To make it up to her, the Seville family takes Ms. Croner out and Alvin offers her the money from the skateboarding competition that he wins at the end of the episode.
4b	4b	"Family Spirit"	Thomas Forwood	14 October 2015	August 6, 2015	104B	2.16
Both Alvin and Dave want to go see a soccer game the next Saturday, but that same day is their "Family Day", which commemorates the first meeting of Dave with the Chipmunks, so they both pretend that they would rather go to their Family Day trip instead. However, Alvin's soccer fever gets the best of him and he tries various plans not to attend the trip. In the end, Alvin confesses his actions to Dave, who reveals that he actually wants to go see the game too, so the whole family decides to postpone the trip.
5a	5a	"The App"	Peter Saisselin	6 May 2015	August 7, 2015	105A	1.89
Dave buys a robot, Harmony, to help him manage the boys, whose constant watching quickly drives Alvin into depression. After a misguided manipulation by Alvin in an attempt to deactivate it, Harmony locks Dave, Simon and Theodore at home and humiliates Alvin before his friends by treating him like a baby, which leads Dave to send Harmony back to the factory on the condition that Alvin behaves better from now on.
5b	5b	"Don Juan Theodoro"	David Sauerwein	3 September 2015	August 7, 2015	105B	1.89
After a misunderstanding, the Chipmunks and Chipettes believe that Theodore has a crush on a girl and give him advice to ask her out. As he is clueless about their behavior, Theodore plays along but it ends in disaster. It is ultimately revealed that Theodore only wanted to ask the girl to be his partner for the cooking fair and that she has a crush on Simon.
6a	6a	"Albrittina"	Peter Saisselin	5 May 2015	August 10, 2015	106A	2.17
After a personality test, Alvin and Brittany discover that they are soulmates. They are both so terrified by this prospect that they assume radically opposite personalities to ensure that it will never happen, but their new selves creep everyone out. Dave, Simon, Theodore and the Chipettes decide to sell the now-useless former belongings of their siblings to make them miss their old personalities, which works perfectly and leads Alvin and Brittany to revert back to their normal selves.
6b	6b	"Simon for President"	Janice Karman & Michael Bagdasarian	8 May 2015	August 10, 2015	106B	2.17
To get rid of the corrupt class president, Bocarter Humphrey, Simon runs for the next class president election. However, he soon has to cope with the concurrent candidacy of Alvin. After the campaign devolves into a petty war and an unauthorized pool party thrown by Alvin at the Seville home, Dave forces Alvin to resign and he confesses to Simon that Bocarter asked him to run too so he would take votes away from his brother in exchange for favors. With Alvin's support, Simon ultimately wins the election.
7a	7a	"To Serve and Protect"	Janice Karman	13 October 2015	August 11, 2015	107A	2.16
Simon becomes the school's safety supervisor and also gets to pick the location for the next family vacation: he chooses the Smithsonian. Alvin, desperate to escape the trip, starts misbehaving at school, hoping that Simon will either give him a citation or let him choose the vacation location, as Dave threatens to cancel the trip if one of them gets into trouble. Unable to make a choice, Simon resigns from his position, which leads to Alvin feeling guilty and talking to both the principal and Dave to fix everything. In the end, Alvin is grounded and does not get to go on the trip while Simon gets his position back, goes to the Smithsonian, and has his teacher Miss Smith babysit him while his family is on vacation.
7b	7b	"Kickin' It Old School"	Janice Karman	12 October 2015	August 11, 2015	107B 115	2.16
Willing to teach the Chipmunks how to live without technology, Dave takes them on a camping trip, only to discover that the once-thriving vacation spot is now in utter decay. After initial difficult moments, they actually start enjoying both their solitude and nature and once back home, although quickly regaining their old habits, the Chipmunks now like to camp in the garden with only their sleeping bags and their imagination.
8a	8a	"Clowning Around"	Janice Karman & Michael Bagdasarian	2 April 2015	August 12, 2015	108A	2.33
Theodore has an audition to play the monster part in the school's play, so Alvin wants to teach him fear. However, when he disguises himself as Theodore's biggest fear (clowns), his brother gets frozen in fear. After Alvin and Simon try several tricks to cure him, which all end in failure, they are forced to bring him to the audition where his empty stare completely scares the casting director who hires him on the spot. Theodore ultimately snaps out of it when crossing a clown's path on the street.
8b	8b	"Bully for You"	Janice Karman	6 April 2015	August 12, 2015	108B	2.33
Simon is being bullied at school, so he creates a bodyguard robot to scare the bullies. This works, but when Simon spots the bullies picking on other students, he forces them to read a pamphlet on bullying; however, they get so fed up that they destroy his robot and start picking on him again. His friends and the other students ultimately make a united stand which leads to the bullies giving up on their habit.
9a	9a	"My Sister the Weirdo"	Janice Karman	31 August 2015	August 13, 2015	109A	2.07
Jeanette asks for Alvin's help to overcome her shyness, but his misguided advice lead her to act very weirdly at school. Brittany, who wants to throw a party at home but is embarrassed by her sister's behavior, makes everyone believe that she is just deranged and humiliates her by saying that she will not be invited to her party in front of the class, hurting Jeanette's feelings (and Eleanor looking at Brittany in disappointment for what she said). During the party, however, Brittany feels guilty and apologizes to Jeanette, who overcomes her shyness long enough to propose a toast to her.
9b	9b	"Turf War"	Peter Saisselin	2 September 2015	August 13, 2015	109B	2.07
To buy a video game, Alvin tries to get a babysitting job to raise money. However, as he is unable to get one, he steals Brittany's own babysitting job, as she is working too to get a new pair of shoes. Alvin proves incompetent for the job and also has to deal with Brittany seeking revenge, while the kid gets unruly. In the end, Brittany gets the kid to calm down and she agrees not to tell his parents about Alvin's poor performance if he buys Brittany's shoes with the money that he earned for taking care of him.
10a	10a	"Good Luck Mr. Whiskers"	Michael Bagdasarian	1 May 2015	August 14, 2015	110A	1.90
One of Ms. Croner's cats have gone missing. The Chipmunks are initially dismissive of the problem, so Ms. Croner tells them that the cat must be found or else the neighborhood will be cursed. After a series of coincidental bad luck events, they start believing in the curse and go searching for the cat, but fail to find it. Ultimately, they find out that the cat had hidden in the Chipettes' treehouse to give birth to a litter of 3 kittens away from Ms. Croner's other cats.
10b	10b	"Who's Your Daddy"	Janice Karman	30 March 2015	August 14, 2015	110B	1.90
Dave gets very sick, and as such is bedridden. Alvin makes a bet with Simon that he can take care of the family until Dave gets better; things quickly turn out for the worse. Realizing that he is going to lose the bet, Alvin makes huge efforts to fix things up and succeeds for the most part, but still has to enlist Dave's help when he finally gets better, thus making Simon the winner no matter what Alvin does.
11a	11a	"Mystic Mountain"	Michael Bagdasarian	31 March 2015	August 17, 2015	111A	1.90
Dave gets addicted to an MMORPG popular within the neighborhood, playing dirty and forgetting his work (composing a film score) in the process. The Chipmunks and Chipettes therefore have to defend the house from a real-life attack by the players and ultimately convince Dave to stop playing in order to resume his work on the film score with their help.
11b	11b	"Candy Confessions"	Janice Karman	1 April 2015	August 18, 2015	111B	2.05
Alvin wants to buy a limited series skateboard but is grounded, so he asks Theodore to go buy it for him. However, Theodore gets to the shop too late and uses the money to buy a coupon for candies instead. Back home, he lies to his brothers, claiming that he was robbed, so the Chipmunks and Chipettes go in search of the thief and catch the boy who had bought the skateboard before Theodore did. Feeling guilty, Theodore confesses the truth, and while upset at first, Alvin ultimately forgives him and Theodore decides to make it up to him by selling candy to everyone.
12a	12a	"Mojo Missing"	Peter Saisselin	7 September 2015	August 19, 2015	112A	1.86
In a moment of generosity, Alvin offers his hat to a fan. However, he soon starts losing his singing and physical skills and believes that his "mojo" has left him along with his hat. He then tries to get it back, but fails every time. The Chipmunks and Chipettes ultimately give him another hat while letting him believe it is his old one and Alvin gets his mojo back. When Alvin discovers the trick, Simon tries to tell him that it is all in his head, but Alvin misses the point and starts believing that he can infuse things that touch his head with his mojo.
12b	12b	"Who's the Animal"	Janice Karman & Michael Bagdasarian	31 August 2015	August 20, 2015	112B	2.27
Alvin is temporarily voiceless. The next day, the Chipmunks go to the zoo disguised as animals and Alvin accidentally gets into a cage while letting free a baby Tasmanian devil due for appendix surgery in the evening. Since he himself is disguised as a Tasmanian devil and is trapped in his costume because he cannot reach the zipper, the zoo personnel mistake him for the baby devil. Fortunately, Simon, Theodore, and Dave, who took the real baby devil with them believing that it was Alvin, realize its true nature and bring it back, saving both Alvin and the baby devil's life (whose condition was worsening) in the process.
13a	13a	"Slippin' Thru My Fingers"	Janice Karman	30 March 2015	August 21, 2015	113A	1.80
Dave is overparenting the Chipmunks, who try to find him a girlfriend in order to get some space. One of their picks, Dave's friend Julie, deciphers the boys' intentions and informs Dave of his reputation as a smother mother. Startled by the revelation, Dave starts going out every night so that the boys can have the space that they are craving for, but they now feel abandoned and ultimately they all have a talk together to try and find a good balance.
13b	13b	"Driving Dave Crazy"	Janice Karman	7 May 2015	August 31, 2015	113B 111	1.64
Dave tries to write a hit song for the next music festival, but is annoyed by the Chipmunks fighting and making a mess in their room. The worst thing of all is that they ruin Dave's song in the process. Will they be able to fix it in time for the big performance?
14a	14a	"Safety Third"	Janice Karman	1 September 2015	September 1, 2015	114A 125	1.81
As Dave refuses to buy a reportedly dangerous toy car for Alvin, the latter hijacks Simon's mechanics project for school so that he will build him a replica of the car. Once finished, Alvin steals it, but he quickly ends up destroying it because of his irresponsible driving. Thankfully, Simon's teacher gives him another chance, but to Simon's horror Alvin tries again to talk him into building him another dangerous vehicle, revealing that he ultimately learned nothing from the experience.
14b	14b	"Mister Manners"	Peter Saisselin	3 September 2015	September 2, 2015	114B	1.63
Alvin and Brittany both compete in a contest to meet an English princess. A few days later, the princess's servant meets them to inform them that Alvin won, but just barely. Alvin and Brittany then have to pass a good manners test, culminating with a date together, to determine who is the actual winner (with everyone knowing that Brittany won't make it easy on Alvin). During the date, Brittany makes Alvin's life a living nightmare, which leads him to lose his temper after she "accidentally" spills juice in his face at dinner. Feeling guilty about what she did, Brittany talks to the princess's servant and Alvin gets to meet the princess. However, it is revealed that he can bring a guest, so Brittany starts acting nice to him hoping that he will still pick her to go meet the princess...
15a	15a	"The Tree House"	Janice Karman	4 September 2015	September 3, 2015	115A	1.91
The Chipettes reminisce how they came to live in their tree house: some time before, they lived at the Seville home with the Chipmunks, but played all the time in the neighbor's tree. However, the neighbor tried to poison it to have it chopped down, but Jeanette, who loved the tree, started living in it so that a local law would have it protected because of the tree constituting a habitat. After some conflict, the neighbor finally just gave up and moved out of town, while the Chipettes moved into the tree permanently.
15b	15b	"Saving Simon"	Peter Saisselin	2 September 2015	September 4, 2015	115B	1.49
The Chipmunks and Chipettes believe that Simon is leaving permanently for a science institute, so they devise a plan to stop him from leaving: stealing his clothes, hiding his communication devices and sabotaging Dave's car, before locking Simon up in his closet to allow Alvin to take his place and ruin his interview with the science institute's envoy. Everything goes according to plan, but it is revealed that Simon was just leaving for summer camp, so everyone ends up having to apologize to him.
16a	16a	"Back to School"	Janice Karman	4 September 2015	September 8, 2015	116A 140	1.56
It is discovered that Dave failed his math test and did not graduate from high school, so he has to go back to school with the Chipmunks and Chipettes to take math lessons. However, lacking interest, he starts misbehaving with Alvin, until Simon and Theodore get fed up with it and give him the lessons themselves, leading him to improve and devising a strategy to help Alvin improve as well. With his good results, Dave takes the final exam and passes, finally becoming a high school graduate.
16b	16b	"Bromance"	Janice Karman	1 September 2015	September 9, 2015	116B 126	1.94
Simon becomes friends with a new student, Jamie, with whom he shares interests. However, when Jamie realizes that the popular kid in their family is Alvin, he ditches Simon to hang out with Alvin. Simon is upset, but Alvin is not really digging Jamie either; besides, Jamie soon realizes that he does not have much fun around Alvin either, so he just ditches the Chipmunks entirely. In the end, Alvin tells Simon that Jamie is hypocritical and that it is his loss if he does not realize how cool Simon is.
17a	17a	"A Room of One's Own"	Fabrice Ziolkowski	7 September 2015	September 10, 2015	117A 144	1.94
After another dispute with Simon, Alvin convinces Dave to give him his own room after a test of maturity which he successfully passes. Alvin then moves to the only spare room in the house - the basement. However, the Chipettes soon realize that the Chipmunks are unhappy and miss each other, so Brittany hints at Alvin that if he reverts to immaturity, Dave will probably move him back into their common room. Alvin applies the plan immediately and is happy to get back with his brothers, and although they do sort of apologize to each other, the dispute soon resumes...
17b	17b	"Carts and Crafts"	Reid Harrison	16 October 2015	September 11, 2015	117B 146	2.09
Alvin leaves Theodore's bike in the rain, so it gets rusty and soon disintegrates. Looking to offer Theodore a new bike, the Chipmunks participate into a competition consisting in rounding up shopping carts left all around town and bringing them back to the supermarket. The episode then turns into a parody of Western movies with the school bully, Derek Smalls, stealing their "herd" of carts before being chased away with help from Ms. Croner. Unfortunately, it is finally revealed that they only won a tiny bike statuette.
18a	18a	"Going Green"	Janice Karman	19 October 2015	November 2, 2015	118A 145	2.09
The Chipmunks and Chipettes try to reduce their carbon footprint to win an ecology contest, in which the prize is a trip to Hawaii. However, as Jeanette is very concerned with the environment, she spreads word of the contest, but the others are so obsessed with winning that they go to extreme lengths, including playing dirty, to be victorious, much to Jeanette's despair. In the end, they lose anyway, but decide to pursue their efforts, to Jeanette's satisfaction, even though they are actually only aiming to win next year's contest.
18b	18b	"Tattle Tail"	Peter Saisselin	20 October 2015	November 3, 2015	118B 149	2.08
Alvin is in love with a girl named Vanessa and to win her over he decides to babysit her pet myna, Birdie. However, the myna proves to be a blabbermouth who annoys everyone, including Alvin who acts mean with him, so the myna starts repeating that Alvin hates him. Afraid that he will say that to Vanessa, Alvin acts very nice with Birdie, but fails to reach a conclusive result. Thankfully, when getting Birdie back to Vanessa, the myna repeats a compliment that Alvin had said earlier about her, so she accepts his offer to go on a date with him.
19a	19a	"She's Got Style"	Peter Saisselin	16 October 2015	November 4, 2015	119A 143	1.76
Fashionista Marina Rodenchia launches a contest to create a hat, in which a quarrelsome Brittany and Jeanette (temporarily a fashion icon by pure chance) enlist; but their situation turns bitter. When Jeanette presents her creation, a hat made out of recycled materials, the others are embarrassed by the disastrous result. They ultimately manage to convince Brittany that family is more important than the contest, so she saves her sister from public humiliation by creating another eco-friendly hat of which she shares creation credit with Jeanette.
19b	19b	"Super Heroes"	Reid Harrison	15 October 2015	November 5, 2015	119B 142	2.24
Theodore wants to be a superhero and Alvin lets him believe he himself is one to take advantage of him. Simon gets on his back, but unwilling to burst Theodore's bubble, they stage a fight with a fake supervillain in which Theodore is victorious. Back home, however, Theodore wants more, so they confess the truth to him. Theodore refuses to believe it and goes on fighting crime, capturing an actual burglar by pure chance. Thankfully he still gives up on being a superhero, but not without taking revenge on Alvin for abusing him.
20a	20a	"Kiss Conspiracy"	Peter Saisselin	15 October 2015	November 6, 2015	120A 147	2.06
Simon is unable to kiss his co-star in the school play, so Alvin and he decice to switch places at the crucial moment. It works, but Simon then becomes extremely embarrassed with the girls at school, much to his chagrin; even telling the truth about what really happened does not work. Ultimately, he chooses to ridicule himself by not being able to kiss his co-star again during the next performance, with Alvin replacing him in front of everyone. Unfortunately, once again the girls are impressed by Simon, and their chase resumes...
20b	20b	"House Guests"	Jean-Phillipe Robin & Peter Saisselin	28 October 2015	November 9, 2015	120B 134	1.82
Dave is worn out, so Alvin secretly decides to offer him a vacation in Hawaii by renting out the house while he is away on a business trip. Unfortunately, the guests arrive a day early so Alvin, with help from the others, try to hide their presence from Dave but the encounter inevitably comes. Dave apologizes to the guests, but decides not to ground Alvin when he learns of his motive. However, this changes quickly when other guests arrive, as Alvin had to rent out the house several times in order to pay for the expensive trip...
21a	21a	"Theozilla"	Reid Harrison	29 October 2015	November 10, 2015	121A 131	1.79
Miss Smith pairs Alvin and Simon for the science fair; after a random string of events Alvin comes to create a substance which, when sprayed on Theodore, turns him into a several-stories high Chipmunk. The newly-created Theozilla wreaks havoc in the city, but Alvin and Simon manage to turn him back to normal, while Miss Smith is blamed for the disaster. However, she wakes up, revealing that it was just a nightmare.
21b	21b	"Doggone It"	Reid Harrison	30 October 2015	November 12, 2015	121B 151	1.86
After the class's cell phones are confiscated, they mysteriously disappear and Alvin is framed for the crime. However, he is allowed to search for the true culprit before the end of the day, and with help from Simon and later Theodore, they discover the thief was the principal's dog who took away the phones and tried to bury them. Alvin gets them back to the class just in time and clears his name.
22a	22a	"Mutiny"	Peter Saisselin	2 November 2015	November 13, 2015	122A 132	1.59
The Chipmunks and the Chipettes have a soccer game, however, they cannot decide who will be the coach, so they all take turns in the role and fail. In the end, everyone gets fed up with it and quits, with only Alvin and Eleanor going to the game. However, the others get re-motivated when two guys make fun of them and they join back again with Alvin and Eleanor. During the game, they all apply the methods that they tried during training and, working together, they beat the opposing team.
22b	22b	"Reality or Not"	Michael Badgasarian	3 November 2015	November 16, 2015	122B 102	1.81
Alvin wants to become a reality TV star and tries different approaches to win over the executives of a media company. Unable to find a good formula, he enlists an extremely enthusiastic Brittany on the condition that she gets to be the co-star of the show, and they finally pull off a great recording. However, Simon, hostile to the whole idea, butts in and tells the executives that the recordings were made for a science study and cannot be published, ultimately ruining Alvin and Brittany's project.
23a	23a	"Let Them Eat Crumbs"	Janice Karman	4 November 2015	November 17, 2015	123A 123	1.70
Eleanor bakes a cake for the school bake-off; however, while she is away buying some last-minute ingredients, the others eat it. When they realize what they just did, they try to re-create the cake but when they bring their cake to the bake-off, the judges do not like it. Thankfully, Alvin retrieves one last portion of the original cake and brings it to the judges just in time; they love it so much that Eleanor wins hands down. Afterwards, the others confess the truth and Eleanor forgives them.
23b	23b	"Who Ghosts There"	Marie Beardmore & Peter Saisselin	5 November 2015	November 18, 2015	123B 150	2.09
The Chipmunks and Chipettes learn that Dave wants to sell the house; they are so upset that they rig the house with special effects so potential buyers will believe that it is haunted and be scared away. This works until a ghost enthusiast buys the house; the Chipmunks then have an explanation with Dave where they discover that he believed that they wanted to move, so they tell him that they did not. However, in the evening, the ghost enthusiast is revealed to work for a TV show, and when he finds out that the house is not actually haunted, he cancels the deal.
24a	24a	"Alvin's Secret Powers"	Janice Karman	6 November 2015	November 19, 2015	124A 201	1.84
Once again taking advantage of Theodore's ingenuity, Alvin makes him believe that he has magical powers. He notably uses this belief to boost Theodore's confidence during soccer training, which leads him to join the soccer team. Meanwhile, Derek bullies Theodore, but he tells him that Alvin will get back at him with his magical powers. Alvin shows up at the arranged confrontation and manages to frighten Derek with help from Simon. From then on, Alvin and Simon try to convince Theodore that Alvin does not have magical powers, but it is apparently going to take time...
24b	24b	"Warbie"	Janice Karman	9 November 2015	November 20, 2015	124B 202	1.61
The Chipmunks find a baby bird which has fallen from its tree and once nursed, it just sticks to Alvin who becomes attached to it and names it "Warbie". However, with help from Simon, Alvin tries to teach Warbie how to survive on its own but the baby bird does not listen. Ultimately, Warbie hurts itself in a fit of panic and the vet takes it away. A few days later, the vet comes back and finds Warbie's nest, bringing it back to its rightful mother, and Alvin is somewhat disheartened to see the baby bird forget him so easily.
25a	25a	"I Will Survive"	Fabrice Ziolkowski & Peter Saisselin	10 November 2015	February 15, 2016	125A 133	2.08
Alvin wants to compete in a survival show, but he injures himself during training. His competitor, Derek, makes fun of him, angering Simon who decides to compete instead in Alvin's place. However, training demonstrates that he is physically unfit. During the competition, he uses his intelligence and manages to keep up with Derek and during the final challenge, a race, Derek finds a way to cheat and win, but the show's host, who saw everything, disqualifies Derek, making Simon the winner.
25b	25b	"Alvin's Got a Brand New Bag"	Pauline Gentile	11 November 2015	February 15, 2016	125B 114	2.08
Brittany wins a rare expensive handbag from Marina Rodenchia, but Alvin accidentally destroys it. Brittany is so upset that Alvin promises to replace it. After trying unsuccessfully to trick Brittany, he decides to walk straight into Rodenchia's shop, hoping that she will agree to give him another one; however, she will only give one to him if he does a photoshoot for a line of children's clothing, to which Alvin reluctantly agrees. Rodenchia then keeps her promise and Alvin is able to make it up with Brittany.
26a	26a	"Art for Art's Sake"	Reid Harrison	12 November 2015	March 7, 2016	126A 152	1.85
Brittany has a new calling: painting. It happens that Marina Rodenchia loves her works, but only after the others (originally accidentally) trash them. However, when Rodenchia calls Brittany to give a talk at her gallery, the others try to steal her works to prevent Brittany from discovering the truth. They are caught by the police, but it does not matter, as Rodenchia's infatuation with Brittany's works is already over.
26b	26b	"Mancave"	Peter Saisselin	13 November 2015	March 8, 2016	126B 148	1.68
When Dave starts hanging out a lot with Julie, the Chipmunks get jealous and then paranoid, believing that she wants to move in, so they try to separate them. However, when they go vastly overboard, Dave has to tell them that Julie was just helping him overcome writer's block.

=== Season 2 (2015–17) ===
No. overall	No. in season	Title	Written by	France air date	U.S. air date	Prod. code	U.S. viewers (millions)
27a	1a	"Dog Days"	Janice Karman	16 November 2015	March 9, 2016	201A	1.75
The Chipmunks find a dog and decide to keep it; however, they run into trouble when they have to hide it from Dave (who believes that they are not responsible enough to have a pet) with Theodore taking the blame for the dog's damage around the house. Ultimately, they find out the dog already has an owner and Theodore regretfully brings it back to her.
27b	1b	"Dragon Dad"	Peter Saisselin	17 November 2015	March 10, 2016	201B	1.94
Theodore is tricked into caring after a supposed dragon egg. Although initially dismissive, Alvin and Simon have to help him after Dave orders them so, as he understands that it is important to Theodore. For their own reasons, but most of all to protect Theodore from the disappointment, Alvin and Simon enlist Brittany's help and try to steal the egg, only to discover that it hatched offscreen, therefore proving to their amazement that the dragon egg story was true all along.
28a	2a	"Members Only"	Janice Karman	18 November 2015	March 11, 2016	202A	1.67
When Derek starts bullying 'the Mathletes' except Simon, Alvin teaches them to become 'the Mathtrons' but it backfires when they become bullies themselves.
28b	2b	"The New Kid"	Janice Karman	30 August 2016	May 9, 2016	202B	1.64
Alvin befriends a shy new student called Emil and teaches him to be cool. However, Theodore gets persuaded that Emil is a thief and a dangerous runaway student hunted by the FBI, eventually contaminating Simon with his paranoia. It turns into a conflict between Theodore and Emil, but Alvin eventually settles things down, and Theodore and Simon get persuaded they were wrong. However, when Emil leaves, supposedly to go back to his home country, FBI agents knock at the door and reveal that Theodore was right all along...
29a	3a	"Simon the Superb"	Janice Karman & Michael Bagdasarian	31 August 2016	May 10, 2016	203A	1.48
Simon's fledgling magic show does not attract any audiences and is mocked by Alvin, and things soon get worse when Alvin finds a book of magic tricks before setting up his own show, which quickly builds success thanks to his showmanship. Upset, Simon challenges Alvin in front of everyone to a magic duel and humiliates him. Alvin is amazed, but Simon tells him that he set up the whole situation with help from their friends, even down to writing the book that Alvin found, just to get back at him and simultaneously build up an audience; however, Alvin is still led to believe his brother is really magical to his frustration.
29b	3b	"The Sub"	Janice Karman	31 August 2016	May 11, 2016	203B	1.65
Alvin needs money, so he becomes substitute music teacher for Miss Smith. However, he proves to be a poor teacher and quickly gives up to just have fun with his students. When the time to perform in front of an audience comes, however, he panics but manages to reach a deal with the students so that they accept to learn a bit. The performance proves to be pretty poor, but the Chipmunks' and Chipettes' vocals make up for it somewhat and Alvin gets to keep his job.
30a	4a	"Lights Camera Uh-Oh"	Michael Bagdasarian	1 September 2016	May 12, 2016	204A	1.59
Jeanette wants to shoot an existential student film for a contest with Dave as the lead, but the others' different conceptions about what the film should be about and Dave's clumsiness in front of the camera ruin it. Eventually, the others try to hastily assemble a film for her, but she informs them that she just made a documentary about an ant instead. Although her film comes last in the contest, Jeanette already starts working on a new one.
30b	4b	"Wax Dave"	Janice Karman	1 September 2016	May 13, 2016	204B	1.60
When the Chipmunks think that a lady is destroying Dave, they take the wax Dave away thinking that it is the normal Dave.
31a	5a	"Brittany the Body Snatcher"	Janice Karman	2 September 2016	June 6, 2016	205A	1.35
After witnessing Alvin defend her from some mean girls, Brittany falls in love with him and starts doing nice gestures to return the favor; instead, Alvin grows uneasy over her suddenly nice behavior because he knows she does not do any of that. Kevin convinces Alvin that the reason Brittany is acting out of character is because an alien body snatcher has taken over her body, causing him to grow paranoid and think she's making Dave her next host, much to the annoyance of Simon. When he becomes convinced that Dave has been infected as well, he and Kevin hold him hostage to force him to admit that he's been possessed, but they get no answers and Alvin is grounded. So Alvin decides to call Brittany and talk to her body snatcher face-to-face to turn both her and Dave back to normal. Furious at him thinking such a thing, Brittany ends her crush on him and leaves, without Alvin learning the truth.
31b	5b	"Agent Smith"	Peter Saisselin	2 September 2016	June 7, 2016	205B	1.42
Simon wants to join the school newspaper, but does not have a great story to submit. Alvin and Theodore lead him to investigate Miss Smith, whom they believe is a secret agent, but his investigations prove otherwise. Therefore, Alvin and Theodore manage to enlist Miss Smith and some friends of hers to enact a secret mission, unbeknownst to Simon, so he can get material for a story. Thanks to them, Simon becomes the newspaper's editor.
32a	6a	"Baby Whisperer"	Janice Karman	5 September 2016	June 8, 2016	206A	1.40
Alvin falls in love with a new girl called Mary-Anne, who happened to be Kevin's visiting cousin; since she likes babies, he dresses Theodore up as one named Ratso and lets him hang out with her twin little brothers to woo her. However, the two kids are mean to Theodore. Besides, Alvin soon has to babysit them, with poor Theodore having to play both his own role and that of the baby after a quid pro quo; the situation quickly gets out of hand and Mary-Anne ultimately leaves, infuriated, with her brothers.
32b	6b	"Let's Make a Deal"	Reid Harrison	5 September 2016	June 9, 2016	206B	1.17
Alvin wishes to build a plane out of toothpicks for Dave to replace the one he had had as a child, but for that he needs Theodore to clean the basement in his stead. However, Theodore wants tickets to a Talking Teddy show in exchange and then things start to get increasingly complex with Alvin soon finding himself caught in a chain of services to give to various main and secondary characters. In the end, he manages to get his toothpicks, although he forgets Simon's service along the way.
33a	7a	"Munk Man"	Janice Karman	30 September 2016	June 10, 2016	207A	1.19
Simon enters a contest to create a superhero character, the winner of which will see his creation turned into a toy. However, Alvin forces himself into being Simon's sidekick and Simon creates a lame costume for him so that he will not steal the spotlight again. Not only does Alvin still manage to do so, but Simon then discovers that the toy creator only created the contest to steal ideas easily. Alvin and Simon manage to capture him and a forgiving Alvin lets Simon get all the credit for the arrest.
33b	7b	"Ride Along"	Michael Bagdasarian	30 September 2016	August 1, 2016	207B 220	1.74
Someone is stealing all the bicycles on the eve of a bicycle race. After Alvin's bike is stolen, he forces himself into being the partner of the local policeman, Officer Dangus, and they manage, with help from Simon, to catch the culprit - Bocarter Humphrey. However, thanks to his father's wealth, Bocarter is soon out, but Alvin gets a new bike thanks to Dangus and Alvin and Bocarter enter the race. Although Bocarter tries to cheat, Alvin ultimately wins the race.
34a	8a	"Alvin's Wild Weekend"	Janice Karman	3 October 2016	August 2, 2016	208A	1.83
After Alvin thinking that he doesn't do much stuff with Dave together, Alvin plans a weekend for him and Dave without Theo and Simon. Dave agrees and wild adventures come to the weekend!
34b	8b	"For Whom the Bell Tolls"	Bart Coughlin	3 October 2016	August 3, 2016	208B	1.54
A visiting hypnotist performs at the Chipmunks' school, Simon is inadvertently hypnotized when Miss Smith is the recent volunteer while in preparation for an upcoming trivia tournament, causing his I.Q. to drop and act like an idiot whenever he hears a bell. Neither Alvin nor Theodore realize the hypnosis until the day of the tournament, when the bell sounds emitted by the buzzers cause Simon to flip back and forth between his idiotic state every other time he buzzes in. When he finally figures everything out, Alvin tells the truth to Simon, but the hypnotist won't return until next day, so with Theodore's help, they tie up Cheesy and hack into the sound system so that the buzzers emit other sounds, and Simon wins the contest.
35a	9a	"iHear"	Peter Saisselin	4 October 2016	August 4, 2016	209A	1.53
After Alvin's phone is confiscated, he manages to convince Simon to lend him an experimental nanophone that Simon invented to replace it. However, the nanophone is soon damaged and it develops the ability to listen to everyone else's phone calls. Alvin then starts telling everyone the info he gathers and Brittany and Simon decide to strike back at him by tricking him into believing that his head will explode if he keeps using the nanophone. In a fit of panic, Alvin destroys it and does not even want to get his original phone back once the punishment is lifted.
35b	9b	"Switch Witch"	Reid Harrison	5 October 2016	August 8, 2016	209B	1.66
The day after Halloween, the Chipmunks' and Chipettes' candy harvest is stolen and replaced with books and fruit. They get convinced that a creature called the "Switch Witch" took them and after some investigations, they think Ms. Croner is the witch. They follow her to a cabin in the woods, where it is revealed that it was a setup by Dave and Ms. Croner in order to make their Halloween funnier.
36a	10a	"Double Trouble"	Janice Karman & Michael Bagdasarian	4 October 2016	August 9, 2016	210A 213	1.48
Alvin breaks into Simon's hidden saferoom in their room and runs into an invention which knocks him out and accidentally creates a clone of himself. However, the clone proves to be ignorant and destructive and soon ruins Alvin's life. In the end, the clone creates an army of copies of himself with the invention and just as the clones are about to overrun the Chipmunks, Alvin wakes up, revealing that he was just dreaming when he got knocked out from the invention, which is revealed to make unpoppable bubbles.
36b	10b	"Liar Liar"	Janice Karman	5 October 2016	August 10, 2016	210B 221	1.61
Dave and Alvin help a man with a flat tire, but during this time Alvin makes up a lie that he has an older brother who is racing in China. This starts a chain reaction where Dave, Alvin and then Simon and Theodore have to cover up for each other as the lie becomes bigger and bigger and spreads at school. In the end, Miss Smith just summons everyone at school and slams Dave for sending the wrong message to his sons.
37a	11a	"Suck Toad"	Janice Karman	6 October 2016	August 11, 2016	211A 222	1.62
When their siblings go to space camp, Alvin and Brittany join a field trip to a wildlife preserve, where an endangered amphibian species accidentally settles on Brittany's face. Since the suck toad cannot be removed without a profession, who is in New Zealand for the time being, Brittany has to follow a list of taking care of the toad since she has become its host, such as wesring dark colors, eating greens, and lathering herself with mud. Alvin has to help her adhere to those protocols despite her refusal, but when she sees the toad starting to get sick, she takes care of it and presents her school project, the toad being removed afterwards.
37b	11b	"Secret Admirer"	Janice Karman	6 October 2016	August 15, 2016	211B 224	1.43
Kevin has a secret crush on a girl. Alvin helps him to ask her out. Kevin tries to send a message to that person but accidentally sends the message to the Chipettes.
38a	12a	"Un-send!"	Bart Coughlin	7 October 2016	August 16, 2016	212A 225	1.40
Simon becomes frustrated with his computer lab teacher, Dr. Hayward, and vents his frustrations by typing out a rant-filled email, but when it is accidentally sent out, the Chipmunks attempt to break into the school and hack into Mr. Haywood's computer in order to try and delete the email before he has a chance to read it.
38b	12b	"The Orb"	Janice Karman	7 October 2016	August 17, 2016	212B 226	1.36
Theodore becomes exhausted with the other kids in school constantly asking him for favors, which he cannot say "no" to. To help Theodore stand up for himself and not let the others keep taking advantage of his kindly nature, Simon creates an orb that is identical to the Magic 8 Ball, instructing him to consult with the orb whenever somebody asks him for a favor, as the orb gives him variations on saying "no".
39a	13a	"The Music Box"	Peter Saisselin	19 December 2016	August 18, 2016	213A 223	1.48
Principal Meadows' beloved cat goes missing, and she is very upset about it. Wanting to help cheer her up until her cat can be found, Theodore brings her a pretty little music box found in Dave's desk, but when Theodore later learns that Dave has contacted the police in regards to the music box being stolen (as it was an heirloom from his grandmother), he panics at the idea of being jailed for stealing it, and asks Alvin to help him retrieve it from the principal's office.
39b	13b	"Special Delivery"	Anne Baraou & Reid Harrison	19 December 2016	August 22, 2016	213B 228	1.32
Miss Croner accidentally sends Theodore away in a box. Alvin and Simon have to get him back before Dave gets home.
40a	14a	"Missing Miss Smith"	Michael Bagdasarian	20 December 2016	August 23, 2016	214A 227	1.44
After Alvin argues with Miss Smith during class, she quits her job and Sergeant Dobkins takes her place, and Alvin tries to get her back by delivering Alvin-like persuasive letters.
40b	14b	"Monster Madness"	Bart Coughlin	20 December 2016	August 24, 2016	214B 229	1.48
While watching a horror movie, Alvin and Simon's scared reactions were recorded and uploaded to the internet, going viral, much to their humiliation. After enduring teasing from the Chipettes, the Chipmunks attempt to stage a horror movie of their own to capture their scared reactions to get back at them. This ends up backfiring, however, when the Chipettes bribe the scheme out of Theodore with pizza.
41a	15a	"Super Girls"	Janice Karman	21 December 2016	August 25, 2016	215A 230	1.50
Alvin claims that only boys can be superheroes, so Brittany makes a bet with him that Jeanette can create superhero suits and gadgets for them, and the loser has to trot around the classroom while slapping their rear end and chanting, "I'm a little donkey". Jeanette initially refuses to be dragged into another bet, but is inspired by the idea of she and her sisters actually helping people by being superheroes, and does her best to create such suits and gadgets, only for them to repeatedly misfire and malfunction.
41b	15b	"Held Back"	Janice Karman	21 December 2016	October 11, 2016	215B	1.48
Alvin dreams of himself being held back a year because Miss Smith told him if he doesn't get a good score on his exam he will be away from his brothers and held back a year.
42a	16a	"It's My Party"	Michael Bagdasarian	22 December 2016	October 12, 2016	216A	1.32
Kevin fears that his birthday party is going to be lame, so Alvin decides to throw a paintball party at his house. Eleanor wants to join with the boys, but the boys will not let her play with them because no girls are allowed. In the end Theodore asks Eleanor to replace him and defeat the boys. Eleanor proves to them that girls can beat boys at anything if they want to. In school, Derek asked Eleanor if she wants to be on his team, but Eleanor says that she is busy.
42b	16b	"Keeping Up With the Humphries"	Bart Coughlin	22 December 2016	October 13, 2016	216B	1.57
The Chipmunks battle with Bocarter Humphrey at a game over the Internet, but because Bocarter has a bigger and more powerful computer, the boys lose the game to him. Wanting to beat him, they attempt to build a new computer for themselves, by swiping every processor in town that they can, creating an energy crisis in the process because of all of the electricity that their new computer consumes and the excessive heat that it puts out.
43a	17a	"We're The Chipmunks"	Michael Bagdasarian	30 December 2016	October 14, 2016	217A 234	1.41
A popular new music group is a rip-off of Alvin and the Chipmunks known as Calvin and the Hipmunks. Dave and the Chipmunks are outraged by this, and find themselves being challenged to a battle of the bands concert by the Hipmnunks' managers. While later trying to spy on the Hipmunks, the Chipmunks accidentally discover that they are actually robots created by their managers, who wanted to steal the Chipmunks' fame and popularity. During the contest, the Chipettes sabotoge the Hipmunks, making them overload and explode in front of the crowd, restoring the real band's reputation.
43b	17b	"Save the Dance"	Janice Karman	30 December 2016	November 1, 2016	217B 235	1.34
Miss Smith is fed up with Alvin and Derek's incessent fighting with each other, and puts them in charge of coordinating and putting the school dance together, forcing them to work together and cooperate - if she catches them fighting, the dance will be cancelled for the entire school. Alvin and Derek believe the assignment that they are tasked with to be nearly impossible, but feel the pressure from the rest of the school to make sure that they stop fighting in order to prevent the dance from being cancelled.
44a	18a	"The Temp"	Janice Karman	23 January 2017	November 2, 2016	218A	1.44
Brittany sprains her ankle after running in the hallway and running directly into Simon. After this incident occurs, Brittany is asked to find someone to temporarily replace her as the principal's assistant. Jeanette is recommended by Brittany and soon they are at odds with each other after Brittany discovers Jeanette's filing system is disorganized, and her meddling with Alvin and Simon's personal hobbies to sneak into the school after hours causes a rift between the brothers.
44b	18b	"Parent Trap"	Peter Saisselin	23 January 2017	November 3, 2016	218B	1.46
Alvin overhears Bocarter's father is going to build his theater model for drama class for him, so he enlists Dave to help him with his model. Dave initially refuses, but decides to help Alvin after Alvin sneaks into Bocarter's house and sees Bocarter's professional model. After some sneaking around from both parties, Alvin ends up building his model on his own. On the day that the project is due, Alvin gets an A+ because he was the only student in the class who built his model on his own.
45a	19a	"Knights"	Michael Bagdasarian	24 January 2017	November 4, 2016	219A 237	1.47
Miss Smith asks the class to perform chivalrous acts and bring back proof of their deeds as homework for the medieval lesson. Theodore is initially very enthusiastic about it but things do not turn out as he had hoped. Meanwhile, Alvin, feeling bad for his brother, sets up a situation for Theodore to perform a chivalrous act with help from Brittany but there too, things get out of hand. In the end, Miss Smith regrets having given such homework when she checks the (overall disastrous) results.
45b	19b	"Snake Charmer"	Bart Coughlin	24 January 2017	February 25, 2017	219B	1.56
Simon is assigned with caring for a snake named Rosie at home for a week, but Dave's fear of snakes presents a dilemma, so Simon creates a robotic clone of Rosie in an attempt to help Dave conquer his fear. It works a little too well, as Dave begins to bond with the robotic Rosie to the point that Simon keeps having to upgrade the programming in order to allow it to achieve whatever Dave thinks he is teaching the snake. The Chipmunks also become upset with Dave for clearly spending so much time bonding with the robotic Rosie that he ends up neglecting them.
46a	20a	"Viral"	Bart Coughlin	25 January 2017	March 4, 2017	220A	1.56
The Chipettes upload a video of themselves singing a medley of the Chipmunks' songs, and end up going viral in the process - much to the annoyance of the Chipmunks, who feel their status is unwarranted for stealing their songs. Desperate to achieve viral status themselves, the Chipmunks look to the Internet to see what the popular trends are to inspire new videos of their own, only to end up getting into trouble for copyright infringement.
46b	20b	"Brothers of Dagarack"	Bart Coughlin	25 January 2017	March 4, 2017	220B	1.56
The Chipmunks are eager to attend the premiere of the newest Dagarack movie, but Simon ends up getting sick, making him unable to go see the movie, and he does not want Alvin or Theodore to go without him. Alvin, however, does not want to miss it, and makes several attempts for he and Theodore to sneak out of the house to go see it, only to be foiled by Simon accidentally thwarting their plans as his illness makes him delusional and causes him to wander around the house aimlessly. Eventually, Dave calls him out for it, but Alvin (and later Theodore) gets sick, although Simon, in an act of understanding and forgiveness, refuses to see the movie in favor of being loyal to his brother.
47a	21a	"Overlooked"	Catherine Guillot-Bonté & Peter Saisselin	3 March 2017	March 11, 2017	221A	1.64
Simon invents a new invisibility suit, but because it is merely a prototype, he still has some work to do on it, and does not want Alvin to borrow it. Alvin, of course, borrows it anyway, only to discover that he is unable to unzip it and get himself out of it, causing him to panic at the idea of having to remain invisible for the rest of his life, and prompting Simon to figure out a way to unzip the suit and remove it from his brother.
47b	21b	"Wish Upon A Star"	Catherine Guillot-Bonté	7 March 2017	March 11, 2017	221B	1.64
While stargazing, the Chipmunks and Chipettes wish upon shooting stars, but Theodore misses them, and becomes saddened that his wish will not come true. After staging another celestial event so that Theodore can make his wish, the others try to figure out what his wish was. After a series of fulfillments that include a box of doughnuts, watching Talking Teddy as a group, hopping on pogo sticks to school, and other such activities, Alvin and Simon finally learn that Theodore's actual wish was to "ride a shooting star", before realizing that what he meant was going on a new roller coaster at the fair called Shooting Star.
48a	22a	"Jeanette's Secret Garden"	Michael Bagdasarian	3 March 2017	March 18, 2017	222A 241	1.48
Jeanette wants to grow a fruit and vegetable garden in an empty area on the school premises, and asks Simon-who is working on repairing the bell system-to obtain permission from Principal Meadows to do. Due to a miscommunication, Jeanette believes that she has permission, and constructs her new garden, only to discover that it had been ransacked in the night. While going uncover to investigate, they discover the school security guard had been attempting to remove the garden, of which Jeanette learns the truth that she did not have the principal's permission. Afterwards, Bocarter obtains permission to install vending machines on the spot instead, but because the machines were placed directly on top of Jeanette's garden, the plant life continues to grow into the machines, causing them to malfunction.
48b	22b	"Treasure Hunt"	Michael Bagdasarian	7 March 2017	March 18, 2017	222B 246	1.48
After helping Ms. Croner clean her basement, Alvin discovers what looks to be a treasure map, and entices the others to go out in a hunt of treasure with him, though Simon refuses to tag along, believing that it will become nothing but a wild goose chase. After getting them lost in the woods in the middle of the night, the others decide to give up on Alvin's expedition and go home, but Alvin ends up falling into a pit and pleads for help - which Simon is able to hear, after the other walkie-talkie had accidentally been left behind in their bedroom. When the others return to retrieve Alvin, they discover a small hope chest, which turns out to be full of old photos of a young Ms. Croner and her late husband.
49a	23a	"Summer Camp"	Janice Karman	29 September 2017	March 25, 2017	224A	1.74
The Chipmunks and Chipettes are sent to a summer camp that is actually split into two separate areas that are run by two brothers, Auggy and Austin. Auggy's half of the camp is in ruins due to Austin's repeated attacks of vandalism, so the Chipmunks and Chipettes band together to help Auggy clean up his half of the camp, while also helping him boost his confidence to stand up to his mean older brother and show him that he is just as capable of running an entire camp as well.
49b	23b	"Blabber Mouth"	Janice Karman & Peter Saisselin	2 October 2017	February 25, 2017	224B	1.56
Alvin never accepts the responsibility of his shortcomings and misdeeds, instead always blaming them on either of his brothers, which angers them and Dave. Theodore takes Alvin to task for always lying and that he should start telling the truth from now on. After a nightmare, Alvin is convinced that Theodore has cursed him into always telling the truth, which ends up causing all kinds of problems for him, such as revealing details for a surprise party for Miss Miller, and telling other people what he really thinks about them.
50a	24a	"He Said She Said"	Bart Coughlin	6 March 2017	May 1, 2017	223A 245	1.48
After the fire alarm had been pulled, engaging the sprinkler system and soaking the entire school, Miss Smith grills Alvin and Brittany for details. In Brittany's version of the story, Alvin pulled the fire alarm in a fit of jealousy because of her and Theodore's fascination with a new kid, who happens to be the leader of a popular band that they are fans of. In Alvin's version, the leader was a nerd and Brittany was boy-crazy and no one came to the concert but them, but has no resolution toward who pulled the alarm. Miss Smith then forces them to recreate the incident where both of their stories ended with them wrestling over Theodore in a tug-of-war, during which they realize the alarm started when Theodore let go of his souvenir balloon which somehow hooked onto the alarm switch and pulled it, and Alvin and Brittany realize they are both innocent and are let off the hook.
50b	24b	"Attack of the Zombies"	Peter Saisselin	29 September 2017	May 2, 2017	223B 249	1.61
Convinced that a zombie invasion is imminent, Alvin and Theodore go all out in an attempt to protect their loved ones.
51a	25a	"Wacky Wednesday"	Peter Saisselin & Catherine Walton Ward	7 March 2017	May 3, 2017	225A 244	1.51
Alvin and Jeanette wake up to discover that they are each inside the other's body, and conclude that it is because of a mishap involving Simon's newest invention from the previous day: a switch ray. While Simon plays hooky so he can work on rebuilding his ray that he had taken apart, believing it to have been a failure, Alvin and Jeanette must spend the day at school pretending to be each other; this causes a rift between Jeanette and Brittany when Alvin (as Jeanette) tells Brittany that she is the one in the wrong in their latest argument, while Jeanette (as Alvin) tries to call off an impending fight between Alvin and Derek after school that day.
51b	25b	"The Chipmunk and the Catfish"	Michael Bagdasarian	2 October 2017	May 4, 2017	225B	1.85
Theodore feels sorry for Cheesy for not having a girlfriend for Valentine's Day, so after clipping a picture of a girl from a newspaper and creating a fake online account, Theodore poses as a girl named Candy, to help Cheesy feel better. Unfortunately, Cheesy falls in love with Candy, and wants to meet her in person, which not only complicates things for Theodore, but makes things even worse when Cheesy happens to see the real Candy in a passing car. With the help of his brothers and Eleanor, Theodore attempts to get to the real Candy to explain everything before Cheesy can meet up with her.
52a	26a	"Time Flies"	Janice Karman	3 October 2017	June 3, 2017	226A 250	1.55
While spying on Simon in the basement working on what appears to be a time machine, Alvin and Brittany are convinced that Simon accidentally sent himself back in time, and keep trying to go back to retrieve him, only to discover that it is actually a photo machine that superimposes the subjects into different time periods; meanwhile, Simon is actually out in search of a replacement part for his machine, one that no camera shop in town seems to carry.
52b	26b	"Prank Calls"	Michael Bagdasarian	3 October 2017	June 3, 2017	226B 248	1.55
Kevin and Cheesy keep making prank phone calls, so the Chipmunks trace the number and attempt to prank them back, only to accidentally dial the wrong number, and get a scary-sounding man who vows to track them down and "make them pay". The Chipmunks soon discover a former secret agent has, indeed, tracked them down, and proceeds to chase them throughout the neighborhood. After many failed attempts to lose him, they are cornered in their own home and come to learn that the agent meant what he said: he makes the boys pay his phone bill for the amount of phone time they wasted with their prank call. Squaring everything away, the agent agrees to teach Kevin and Cheesy a lesson by calling them back and making the same threat of finding them and making them pay.

=== Season 3 (2017–19) ===
No. overall	No. in season	Title	Written by	France air date	U.S. air date	Prod. code	U.S. viewers (millions)
53a	1a	"The Karate Kidder"	Janice Karman	6 April 2018	June 10, 2017	301A	1.40
Alvin takes up karate, and is set to have a big match against a well-known opponent, which worries Dave, Simon, and Theodore, who think that Alvin would end up getting hurt. Simon decides to put Alvin through aggressive and strenuous training sessions, hoping that it will tire him out to the point that he will sleep through the match. This does not work, and Alvin goes up against his opponent - who turns out to be the son who shares the namesake of his well-known father - and wins the match.
53b	1b	"Playing Favorites"	Janice Karman	9 April 2018	June 10, 2017	301B	1.40
Dave has many scrapbook full of newspaper clippings about Simon's achievements, as well as photos of him throughout his music room. Alvin is convinced that Simon is Dave's favorite, and persuades Theodore into competing against Simon at whatever they can to prove to Dave that they can succeed at something to make Dave as proud of them as he would be of Simon.
54a	2a	"Back to Basics"	Janice Karman	10 April 2018	June 17, 2017	302A	1.39
After being embarrassed at school, Simon decided to seclude himself in order to help clear his mind, and moves into the tree in the backyard, requesting his brothers and the Chipettes not disturb him. The others, understandably, come to the conclusion that Simon has literally lost his mind, and try to lure him out of the tree before he ends up becoming a crazed, mountain-dwelling hermit.
54b	2b	"Report Cards"	Michael Bagdasarian	11 April 2018	June 17, 2017	302B	1.39
With the school report cards coming out, Alvin worries that if Dave sees his grades, he won't buy him the new video game he wanted, so he plots to get his report card from the mailman before Dave. Simon refuses to be part of it, but Theodore reluctantly agrees to help out. Alvin has Theodore camp out in a makeshift mailbox to get the mail by scaring the mailman away, but the report card is not in the mail, and when Dave comes out having heard Theodore screaming, Alvin and the Chipettes cover it up as a song they were writing. Eventually, Dave catches on to Alvin's trick, revealling he already saw his report card online, but reveals his grades are improving and is proud of him, but instead of getting him the video game, he instead gets another mailbox and forces Alvin to sit inside to get back at him.
55a	3a	"The Cat Sitter"	Janice Karman	12 April 2018	June 24, 2017	303A	1.61
Dave is upset with the Chipmunks due to their slacking performance in school brought on by their extracurricular activities, and instructs them to engage in no such activities for the time being to focus more on their school work. In spite of this, Theodore had been talked into house- and pet-sitting for Ms. Croner, and now must take on his responsibility behind Dave's back. Meanwhile, Dave has been nominated for a Good Samaritan Award for his contributions to the community and his willingness to help others, only for the boys to blow it for him when they point out his orders to them not to do anything to help anyone.
55b	3b	"Addicted"	Bart Coughlin	13 April 2018	June 24, 2017	303B	1.61
Jeanette wants to conduct a psychological experiment to see if the Chipmunks can last without engaging in their favorite activities for three hours. Each of the boys are locked in a room in the school basement with an object of their desire: Alvin with a new video game, Simon with a new model spacecraft, and Theodore with a box of cupcakes, and they proceed to grow anxious and mad as they try to control themselves as time passes. The Chipettes monitor their progress, though Brittany and Eleanor decide to turn things up a notch by sending in various distractions to pressure the Chipmunks into caving in to their desires. In the end, they wind up failing with only five minutes left, proving they truly can't go that long without their favorite things, though Brittany gets the last laugh by immediately failing a challenge set up for herself.
56a	4a	"Spoiler-Itis"	Bart Coughlin	10 May 2018	August 14, 2017	304A 307	1.43
His brothers and the Chipettes are annoyed with Alvin always spoiling the new episodes of their favorite show, Alien Cat Invasion, so Alvin agrees to refrain from talking for 24 hours: if he loses, he has to wear Brittany's new t-shirt that has her face emblazoned on it; if he wins, the rest have to carry him around in the hallways and chant "Alvin rules!" After the silent treatment gets him into other trouble throughout the day (including being unable to deliver an oral report), Theodore accidentally erases the DVR recording of the season finale, prompting the others to beg Alvin to tell them what happened in the episode, only to get no word for him and he wins the bet.
56b	4b	"Something Fishy"	Barbara Weber-Boustani	11 May 2018	August 15, 2017	304B 311	1.35
Theodore wins a goldfish at the fair, which he names Henry. The following morning, Alvin and Simon find Henry belly-up in his bowl, and try to bring him back to life before Theodore finds out. When Simon's electro-shock fails to regenerate the fish, Alvin goes back to the fair to try to win another goldfish, while the Chipettes distract him. Alvin fails to win a new goldfish, so Jeanette buys one at the pet store, which Alvin and Simon slips into Henry's bowl without Theodore knowing, but they feel guilty about switching the goldfish behind Theodore's back; eventually, they learn that Theodore knew the difference anyway, because the goldfish that he won at the fair was a plastic toy.
57a	5a	"Baby Mama Drama"	Janice Karman	14 May 2018	August 16, 2017	305A	1.45
Miss Smith assigns robotic babies to her students to care for to learn about parenting, warning them that some are happy babies, and some are fussy babies. Alvin and Brittany end up with a fussy baby that neither one of them are able to handle, which drives them so crazy that Alvin attempts to rework the baby's wires to make it stop crying. With help from a reluctant Simon, Alvin and Brittany's baby suddenly goes haywire after they attempt to give it a bath, as it attacks the entire classroom.
57b	5b	"Ballet Boys"	Bart Coughlin	15 May 2018	August 17, 2017	305B 310	1.35
Coach Dobkins is unhappy with the soccer team's gameplay, and is persuaded to enroll the team in ballet class, after learning that many professional athletes practice ballet to improve their flexibility on the playing field. At first, Alvin is humiliated at the prospect of other students seeing him on his tip-toes amongst a class that is mostly girls, but soon comes to appreciate that ballet is not as easy as it seems, and is even amazed at how much his flexibility and mobility has improved since taking the lessons.
58a	6a	"Oh Brother Where Art Thou"	Janice Karman	16 May 2018	October 30, 2017	306A	1.35
Alvin is frustrated with Simon catching him from sneaking out to a water park, and when he thinks he told on Dave, he angrily wishes he never existed. The next day, Alvin wakes up to find Simon missing, all of his belongings are gone, his contact deleted from his phone, and nobody seems to remember who he is, leaving Alvin to worry that he wished Simon out of existence and is losing his mind. It turns out in the end Simon was still around, having left the house with Dave to buy tickets to the water park and set up the scenario with Dave and the Chipettes to teach Alvin what his life would be without him, and Alvin apologizes to Simon admitting his life would be even worse without him in it.
58b	6b	"The Wall"	Michael Bagdasarian	17 May 2018	November 1, 2017	306B	1.37
The wall in the girls' bathroom has pictures of the Chipmunks, with votes as to who among them is the cutest. Alvin becomes obsessed with this, wanting desperately to be seen as the cutest of them all, wanting his brothers to make themselves seem less cute and appealing, though neither of them care about their rankings. His attempts to make his brothers look like fools causes them to actually rise in the rankings, and Alvin to drop, so he tries to act more nerdy like Simon and more babyish like Theodore, which still does not help him. After a special meeting with other girls in school - which Alvin attends, disguising himself as one "Chantral Beauregard" - the girls agree to vote Alvin the cutest and be nice to him about it (after Brittany bribed them into doing it).
59a	7a	"The Gift"	Peter Saisselin & Amy Serafin	30 August 2018	November 2, 2017	307A	1.38
For Dave's birthday, Theodore knits a sweater vest for him - a vest that is poorly-made, outlandish-looking, and ill-fitting. Dave does not want to hurt Theodore's feelings, but also does not want to be embarrassed by wearing it in public - especially since he is in negotiations to work with a popular singer who is looking for a new songwriter. Alvin, Simon, and the Chipettes conspire to have the vest ruined so that Dave will not have to wear it, but also make it appear to be an accident so that Theodore will not think that Dave did not like it.
59b	7b	"Theo Knows Best"	Janice Karman	30 August 2018	November 3, 2017	307B	1.09
The Chipmunks and The Chipettes have an argument about what Theodore should do as Theo found a winning lottery ticket. Soon, Alvin comes up with ideas that leads it too far.
60a	8a	"Simsky"	Catherine Guillot-Bonté & Peter Saisselin	31 August 2018	February 17, 2018	308A 316	1.27
Simon has been working on a new stain remover, but his excessive work on his current project drains him of his energy and he begins sleepwalking - and tagging graffiti throughout town in his sleep. When he discovers that he is the one responsible, and that other copycat taggers were inspired to do the same, Simon works even more feverishly to finish his stain remover.
60b	8b	"Lucky Day"	Jason Lethcoe	31 August 2018	February 17, 2018	308B 322	1.27
Alvin's luck goes from bad to worse after Theodore finds a four-leaf clover.
61a	9a	"Curiosity"	Bart Coughlin	3 September 2018	February 24, 2018	309A 317	1.22
After being pranked too many times by Alvin, Simon vows revenge against him. Alvin dismisses it at first, but the Chipettes convince him that, being the smart one, Simon is very effective at playing pranks. Alvin attempts to smooth things over with Simon, who does forgive his brother, but still vows revenge. When a mysterious box is delivered for Simon, and he instructs Alvin not to open it while he is away for a couple of days, Alvin fears the contents of the package are Simon's revenge against him, and goes to greath lengths to see what the contents are. Finally, Alvin smashes the package with a baseball bat, then learns that the contents of the package were actually his birthday present from Simon, and that the scare that Simon initiated by telling him not to open the package while he was gone was the revenge on Alvin that he had promised.
61b	9b	"House Pest"	Janice Karman	3 September 2018	February 24, 2018	309B	1.22
Ms. Croner's house becomes infested with termites, and she asks the Sevilles if she and her cats can stay with them until her house is fumigated. Dave reluctantly agrees, and the Chipmunks soon find their new house guest to be more of a pest, as she ends up making demands of them, such as Simon to do her laundry, Theodore to make her tea, and weaseling Alvin out of his TV time. The boys attempt to drive her out of the house but, growing up with a bunch of brothers herself, Ms. Croner is always one step ahead of them. After these attempts fail, the Chipmunks discover that Ms. Croner and Russel the Exterminator appear to have feelings for one another, so Alvin tries to play matchmaker, hoping that it will bump her to the top of his work list.
62a	10a	"The Fugitives"	Bart Coughlin	28 September 2018	March 9, 2018	310A	1.05
Dave buys a fancy new flatscreen 8K TV, but in no time, the Chipmunks accidentally destroy it by playing a game of Thumperball in the house. Fearing impending rage from Dave, they take off on their own and become fugitives on the lam, documenting their flee on camera along the way. With supply and morale running low, the boys become edgy and lash out at each other, but are soon caught by Dave, who is happy to see that they are okay, and lets them know that they mean more to him than any new TV.
62b	10b	"Sherlock Chipmunk"	Jason Lethcoe	28 September 2018	March 9, 2018	310B	1.05
Jeanette is inspired to become a detective after she had been reading a number of Sherlock Holmes books, and sees a potential mystery when Theodore's Talking Teddy turns up missing. Dragging a reluctant Eleanor along as her Dr. Watson, Jeanette follows the clues she discovers, which eventually leads them to Ms. Croner's house, where they learn that Alvin had made a deal with her: she will make a special superhero outfit for Teddy for Theodore's birthday, in exchange for Alvin helping her eat several jars of an awful jam that a friend had made for her.
63a	11a	"Independence Day"	Janice Karman	1 October 2018	March 16, 2018	311A	1.15
The Chipmunks become fed up with always having to do chores for Dave, and decide to move out on their own and live their own lives their own way. Wanting to build a tree house in the backyard, each of the boys design their own ideal dream tree house, much to Dave's concern, who feels that each of their ideas are far too dangerous, and has a nightmare in which he has to keep saving Alvin and will only encourage them to become reckless. Determined to prove to Dave that they are mature and independent enough to live on their own, the boys borrow a dog house from Cheesy and claim it as the new tree house they built. They intend to spend the night in the tree - without coming in for dinner or any other requests from Dave - to prove their point. When this backfires and the boys' fighting causes Dave to bring them back home, they spend two weeks believing Dave is mad at them and is going to punish them, only to learn that he had built a proper tree house for them all this time - combining each of their ideas and designs.
63b	11b	"Opposites Attract"	Janice Karman & Michael Bagdasarian	1 October 2018	March 30, 2018	311B	1.11
Dave is fed up with Alvin and Simon constantly fighting, and disciplines them for it, but another fight between them ruins Simon's latest scientific experiment: a ray that can magnetize anything it hits. After becoming accidentally magnetized to each other, and desperate to keep anyone from finding out what happened, Alvin and Simon pretend to be bonding with one another - even going so far as to put up a front that Alvin is protecting Simon from a pair of men who are after him. Meanwhile, Simon makes repeated attempts to meet with a pair of scientists to help them out of their situation, only to be scared away by Miss Smith, who presumes them to be the men who are looking to hurt Simon. Eventually, Alvin finds the missing part to Simon's invention in his bed, and Simon is able to fix it and separate them.
64a	12a	"Temporary Mom"	Janice Karman & Michael Bagdasarian	2 October 2018	April 6, 2018	312A	1.08
The Chipmunks grow tired of Miss Miller being called on to babysit them, so they each try to find their ideal new baby sitter, but each of them have vastly different ideas of who their new babysitter should be. Alvin hires a militant woman who pushes them beyond their limits in competitive sports, and enjoys playing mean-spirited pranks on them. This upsets Theodore, who insists on hiring a more grandmotherly type of babysitter, but his choice turns out to not only be overly protective, but also absent-minded, as she not only wraps them in padding and leashes them to a tree, but also forgets where she left them. Finally, Simon's choice is a lady scientist who carries her own mobile lab with her, but a misunderstand scares them into believing that she wants to steal their brains. After their experiences, the boys decide that Miss Miller is the ideal babysitter after all.
64b	12b	"Tee Fore Two"	Jason Lethcoe	2 October 2018	April 13, 2018	312B	1.11
Alvin takes up an interest in golfing, and learns all he can about the game so that he can volunteer as a caddy in a tournament being held by the school faculty. At first, he is unhappy to learn that he will be caddying for Miss Smith - who is not thrilled about him being her caddy, either - but they surprisingly manage to work well enough together out on the green, despite efforts by Coach Dobkins and Bocarter to sabotage them and win the trophy for themselves.
65a	13a	"Dave Rebooted"	Janice Karman	5 October 2018	February 10, 2019	315A 332	1.03
A car accident results in Dave's temporary amnesia. The doctor orders he take it easy until his memory is fully restored. Deciding to take advantage of this, Alvin talks Dave, Simon, and Theodore to take a vacation at a ski resort, where they enjoy hitting the slopes, relaxing in the saunas, and Dave begins a romance with a cute ski instructor. Dave is confused about a series of messages left on his phone by Miss Smith regarding the boys' absence of school, and to compound things, the Chipmunks discover that Miss Smith is at the same resort the same weekend. In their attempts to retrieve Dave and flee, another accident results in Dave's memory being restored, but now Alvin has temporary amnesia, which the others use to convince him that he loves to study and wants his own private tutor.
65b	13b	"Germs"	Janice Karman & Michael Bagdasarian	5 October 2018	February 10, 2019	315B 331	1.03
After learning about germs at school, and how harmful they can be, Theodore turns into a paranoid, obsessive-compulsive neat freak, who is determined to make sure his environment is as sparkling clean as possible. He goes to extremes by santizing everything he comes into contact with, and avoids everything that he possibly can where he may come into contact with germs, but as if that is not bad enough, he also orders a protective plastic bubble that he decides to move into and make his new home. That night, the bubble breaks lose from its foundation, and rolls Theodore into a landfill for the rest of the night. Upon returning home the next morning, and realizing that he survived a night at the garbage dump - while also being informed by Simon that not all germs are dangerous, and in fact some of them are good and even beneficial for people's health - Theodore changes his mind about germs and decides that they are not so bad after all.
66a	14a	"Theo's Big Night Out"	Janice Karman & Vanessa Bagdasarian	24 December 2018	February 17, 2019	324A	1.21
The Chipmunks are invited to Cheesy's house for a sleepover, but Simon and Alvin are unable to attend, as Simon will be en route to an out-of-town convention, and Alvin is grounded. Theodore is afraid to sleep over at Cheesy's house without his brothers with him, but Alvin tries to help his brother conquer his fears and convinces him of all of the fun activities that are sure to be had at the party. Unfortunately, among those invited to the sleepover is Derek, who wastes no time in playing mean-spirited pranks against Theodore, goading the others into playing along with him. Theodore ends up locked up in the attic, losing his cellphone in the process, and when Alvin is unable to reach him, he senses trouble and goes to retrieve Theodore himself - while also taking time to give Derek a big taste of his own medicine.
66b	14b	"The Bodyguard"	Peter Saisselin	25 December 2018	February 17, 2019	324B	1.21
Realizing that other celebrities have their own personal bodyguards to keep crazed fans at bay, Alvin feels the need to have bodyguards as well, hiring Theodore, Kevin, and Cheesy to do just that. Things begin to get out of hand as the three start taking their roles as Alvin's new bodyguards seriously, going so far as to scare away anybody who even remotely tries to get near Alvin - including Miss Smith. Seeing that things are being carried too far, Dave orders Theodore, Kevin, and Cheesy to stop what they are doing, while also trying to drive his point across to Alvin that he has no need for personal bodyguards, as there is nothing and no one that poses any serious threat to him.
67a	15a	"A Rose by Any Other Name"	Michael Bagdasarian & Craig Carlson	26 October 2018	February 23, 2019	320A 343	0.94
Simon experiments with playing positive and negative words to plants to see how it affects how they grow and thrive: the plant that hears positive words through the headphones grows happy and healthy; the plant that hears negative words through the headphones grows mean and aggressive. Once big enough, the monster plant goes berserk and begins devouring other plants in its path. Realizing that he has literally created a monster, Simon tries to capture the rogue plant, and switch out its headphones so it can listen to more positive words of encouragement in order to stop the madness. Cover Song: "Bad to the Bone"
67b	15b	"Queen Bee"	Janice Karman	28 February 2019	February 23, 2019	320B 336	0.94
Brittany is afraid of bees after a past experience resulted in her getting stung. Upon seeing a colony of honey bees has constructed a new hive in their tree, she calls an exterminator, who is unable to remove the hive until the following day. Then, After a mishap with Simon's shrink ray, one of the worker bees brings Brittany straight back to the hive, where Brittany has a dream where she learns honey is used to treat a wound that she received to her knee, as well as to calm her nerves. The queen bee then decides to have Brittany spend the whole day within the colony in order to see all that honey bees do and how beneficial they really are for everyone; after gaining a new appreciation for the bees, the queen bee anoints Brittany their new royal protector, and entrusts her to keep them safe. The next morning, as the hive is being smoked by the exterminator, Brittany must reverse Simon's shrink ray in order to enlarge her back to her normal size so that she can stop the exterminator from destroying the hive, and instead, relocate it to another tree.
68a	16a	"Talking Teddy's Revenge"	Janice Karman	22 October 2018	March 2, 2019	316A 330	0.99
Alvin hurts Theodore's feelings at school by speaking poorly of Talking Teddy. This gets the attention of the new girl, Anita, who plots revenge with Theodore against Alvin by having him believe that Teddy has the power to communicate with others and predict the future. Convinced that he has to do five kind things throughout the rest of the week, Alvin starts carrying Teddy around everywhere and being nice to him, which makes him a laughing stock to the rest of the school - especially around Derek, who is competing against Alvin for Anita's affection. Humiliated, Alvin ditches Teddy in the bushes, much to Theodore's horror, which prompts him and Anita to come clean about their revenge plot in order to teach him a lesson about not being so self-centered and being insensitive towards others' feelings.
68b	16b	"Snail-A-Palooza"	Janice Karman & Michael Bagdasarian	23 October 2018	March 2, 2019	316B 326	0.99
Alvin tricks Theodore into doing his chores by making up a fake holiday known as Snail-A-Palooza, a holiday in which the magical and benevolent Walter the Glorious Snail will bring presents to good little boys and girls who do all of their chores (and do nice things for their brothers). After learning about this, Dave reprimands Alvin for his lie and pressures him into making Snail-A-Palooza a real holiday, so as not to crush Theodore's spirit. After enlisting Jeanette's help, the two write up a handbook about the celebration of Snail-A-Palooza - including Walter abducting bad boys and girls and punishing them by stuffing them into his shell. After a nightmare in which Walter shows Alvin what becomes of Theodore because of his bad influence, such as wrecking things in the house and blaming Alvin for it, and stuffing him into his shell for lying to Theodore, Alvin takes the task seriously, and Theodore awakens to a fully-decorated house (combining already-existing holidays), and presents left by Walter.
69a	17a	"Girls Night Out"	Janice Karman	4 October 2018	March 9, 2019	314A 322	0.86
Dave feels guilty over forgetting about family movie night by taking the Chipmunks to a convention, and leaving the Chipettes behind, so he agrees to spend an entire day with them doing whatever they want - so they decide to go hiking. Dave vastly underestimates the girls' abilities and resources in the great outdoors, and quickly grows tired from their excursion. It also does not help Dave's case that because of his own inexperiences, he constantly gets himself into trouble on their hike, such as falling from the face of a cliff during rock climbing and throwing his back out; luckily, the girls are able to tend to his aid by constructing a makeshift shelter for him, nursing his wounds, and providing him with campfire food, impressing him with their knowledge of the outdoors.
69b	17b	"Tables Turned"	Bart Coughlin	4 October 2018	March 9, 2019	314B 329	0.86
Brittany has an emergency: the Internet is off. She pleads for help from Simon, though Alvin insists that he is just capable of fixing such a problem as Simon is, and even challenges Simon when he gets the Internet up and running by having them take an online I.Q. test. The results: Simon's I.Q. is 102, while Alvin's is 154; Simon is horrified to learn that Alvin is smarter than him, but Alvin confides in Theodore that the online test was a prank, and that you can doctor your results. When the Chipettes bribe the information out of Theodore with a candy bar, they bring Alvin and Simon together for a video game challenge, but secretly have a gaming expert playing for Simon out of sight, thus beating Alvin. However, upon seeing how miserable the brothers are at having their skills turned on them, Brittany tells them the truth.
70a	18a	"Pack Animal"	Barbara Weber-Boustani	29 October 2018	March 16, 2019	321A 347	0.91
Simon has a hoarding problem, so Dave tells him to start cleaning house and get rid of his old inventions that he does not use anymore. It takes him all day and night, but Simon manages to fill two boxes: one of inventions to keep, and another of inventions that can be discarded. Unfortunately, Theodore accidentally donates the wrong box to a thrift store, where Simon's more dangerous and unstable inventions quickly sell, causing all sorts of mayhem for the consumers that have bought them - the most dangerous of which is a black hole device purchased by Bocarter's father and his four year old brother, Neville. After Neville, the Chipmunks, the Chipettes, and other items are sucked into the black hole, Simon must quickly reverse its pull to send them all back down to Earth.
70b	18b	"The Haunted Getaway"	Janice Karman	28 February 2019	March 16, 2019	321B 348	0.91
Dave takes the boys to a cabin in the woods for the weekend, but has made it perfectly clear to Alvin that he cannot mention anything about the cabin being haunted, citing a previous incident where Alvin's teasing gave Theodore a complex. To make matters worse, Alvin begins witnessing and experiencing all sorts of spooky happenings in the cabin, such as ghosts peering through windows, closet doors opening and closing, lights flickering, and furniture moving independently. Convinced that he is up to his old pranks again, Dave completely shoots down each of Alvin's attempts to tell the others what is going on to prevent Theodore from being scared. It is not until Alvin enters a restricted shed on the property that he discovers that everything was staged by a pair of people producing a prank reality show, and that he was their latest victim.
71a	19a	"School Alone"	Janice Karman & Michael Bagdasarian	3 October 2018	March 30, 2019	313A	0.93
When Brittany accuses Alvin of drawing unflattering doodles of Miss Smith on the blackboard and a fight ensues between the two of them, they get left behind from a field trip. On top of that, it is the school's Founder's Day, and legend has it the ghost of the school's founder and first graduate, William Storm Grockenberger, returns on Founder's Day every year to haunt the hallways of the school. When the lights go out, the doors lock, and Alvin and Brittany hear strange noises throughout the hallways, they fear that they have angered the ghost of Grockenberger, and attempt to communicate with him to make peace. The "ghost" was actually Jimmy the school janitor covered in flour, and Brittsny thanks Alvin for saving her life before they finally leave the school arguing as always, just as the real ghost appears and spooks Jimmy.
71b	19b	"It Came from Outer Space"	Bart Coughlin	3 October 2018	March 30, 2019	313B	0.93
Realizing that he forgot about the impending science project, Alvin picks up a rock he finds on the sidewalk, and decides to pass it off as a meteorite piece he claims he has discovered. Within no time, a team of government agents swarm the school and chase Alvin down, because as it turns out, the rock that he picked turns out to actually be a meteorite piece, and they want it - by any means necessary.
72a	20a	"Pizza Dash"	Janice Karman & Michael Bagdasarian	22 October 2018	April 6, 2019	317A	0.77
The local pizza parlor is reduced to a one-man operation, as the owner is now overworked with having to do everything by himself: take orders, make pizzas, and make deliveries. Feeling sorry for him, Simon develops a team of artificially intelligent drones to help with the tasks. Unfortunately, with having artificial intelligence, the drones have the ability to learn and retain information, and pretty soon the whole town is under attack by an army of drones bombing everyone and everything with pizzas, prompting Simon and his brothers to battle the drones in order to defeat them and save everyone. However, the drones learn their movements and merge into a humungous drone thst corners them. The Chipmunks defeat it by shouting many orders until it shuts down, and they return home as Dangus takes care of it, but the drone turns back on implying it might attack again someday.
72b	20b	"Glory Days"	Jeffery St. Ours	23 October 2018	April 6, 2019	317B	0.77
While cleaning out the basement, Alvin and Simon come across an old box full of records made by "Seville and the Screaming Caterpillars", and find old photos that show Dave was once in his own rock band. Alvin worries that by he and his brothers entering Dave's life, they forced him to leave his previously life of being a cool rock star behind, and "turn lame". After learning that the Screaming Caterpillars are still a band, and reduced to performing in retirement homes, Alvin and Simon seek out to learn more about them; it is clear that one member of the band is still holding a grudge against Dave for bailing out on them, but the other band members explain to the boys that Dave simply grew tired of all the traveling and touring that came with being in a rock band, and wanted to pursue his own life.
73a	21a	"Switcheroo"	Bart Coughlin	24 October 2018	April 13, 2019	318A	0.90
While fleeing an elderly man's store with the money that he had robbed, a man accidentally bumps into the Chipmunks, and in the confusion, takes Theodore's backpack by mistake, leaving the boys with the stolen money. They return the money to the store owner, but Theodore is depressed about losing Talking Teddy, which was in his backpack at the time it was stolen. Soon, Theodore receives a phone call from the robber, leaving him with instructions to meet at their high school on Saturday to make an exchange. The Chipmunks enlist the aid of Officer Dangus, who sets up a sting operation, by having Alvin wear a wire, and get him to identify himself and confess his crime on audio, while Dangus and the others await in a fully-equipped police van to make their move. Unfortunately, a series of mishaps hinders the operation, causing the robber named Lyle to lose his patience and attempt to kidnap Alvin to hold for ransom, until Theodore decides to put a stop to everything by taking out Lyle, and allowing Dangus to make the necessary arrest.
73b	21b	"The Paperboy"	Craig Carlson, Michael Bagdasarian & Janice Karman	24 October 2018	April 13, 2019	318B	0.90
Alvin has been stealing Dave's morning newspapers, and selling various sections of interest to the school faculty. Unaware of this, Dave assumes that Jimmy the paperboy has not been delivering as he should, and refuses to pay him; this outrages Jimmy, who goes to extreme lengths to stalk and terrorize Dave into paying up. Fearing for his life, Dave calls Officer Dangus to investigate the matter, while Jimmy does a little investigating of his own, and once he sees what Alvin is up to, he exacts his revenge by sending Alvin on a wild goose chase to retrieve a remote-controlled newspaper. As it turns out, Alvin was only acting on Dave's advice: "If you want something, you have to work for it." Dave disapproves of Alvin using his newspapers as a means of doing so, and Jimmy is let off the hook.
74a	22a	"Across the Universe"	Peter Saisselin	25 October 2018	April 20, 2019	319A 339	0.68
Alvin and Bocarter get into yet another bet: this time, Alvin has to prove the existence of alien life out in space within one week, or else he will have to parade himself around in Basil's bunny suit. Desperate not to lose the bet, Alvin enlists Simon's help, as Simon also wants to prove the existence of alien life - for completely different reasons. Simon develops a communication machine that can pick up and transmit signals from outer space, but after days of hearing nothing, Alvin grows even more desperate, and has Theodore record a tape message, claiming to be an alien, which he then sends afloat into the air with balloons so that Simon's machine can pick up the signal. Unfortunately, this backfires, and Alvin loses the bet - much to the amusement of actual aliens that have been watching it all unfold the entire time.
74b	22b	"Britt's Picks"	Peter Saisselin & Amy Serafin	25 October 2018	April 20, 2019	319B 342	0.68
Brittany writes a blog about fashion, make-up, and beauty, but computer problems and a cold slow her down, so Jeanette decides to help her out. Feeling that her blog is shallow, Jeanette decides to blog about volunteer work and preserving the environment instead. After Brittany is back in full health and sees what happened to her blog, she assumes the perpetrator was Alvin trying to prank her, so she retaliates by setting up a series of pranks and jump scares throughout the house to make Alvin think that somebody is out to get him, but removes the evidence whenever he tries to show Dave and his brothers. When Brittany learns the truth, she feels insulted and betrayed by her sister, until she ends up receiving an award for a specific blog entry she had written about in regards to inner beauty, which also helps Jeanette realize that not all of Brittany's blog is as shallow as it seemed; the two sisters decide to team up and write the blog together while not letting Alvin in on the truth.
75a	23a	"The Devil Wears Rodentia"	Peter Saisselin, Amy Serafin & Michael Bagdasarian	26 October 2018	June 10, 2019	322A	0.53
When Brittany's passion for fashion and creativity catches Marina Rodentia's eye, the fashion mogul hires her to be her new apprentice in her store to help her come up with the next wave of trends; Brittany accepts the job with glee, but is soon disheartened when Marina relegates her to performing menial tasks throughout the store, such as cleaning and running personal errands, all the while Marina discards and trashes all of Brittany's concepts, telling her nobody will be willing to take a chance on anything new - especially from a "squirrel girl." Not wanting her sisters to know about her misery, Brittany quietly decides to quit, but discovers that Marina had secretly been stealing all of her designs and passing them off as her own, knowing her name and reputation will sell them to the fashion world. Outraged, Brittany calls Marina out for stealing her work, officially calls it quits, and decides to open up her own fashion line. All of this, meanwhile, Alvin is desperate to become a male model, to further put himself out in the spotlight.
75b	23b	"Career Day"	Barbara Weber-Boustani	29 October 2018	June 10, 2019	322B 338	0.53
It is Career Day at school, but Dave feels a tad inferior to the other parents, who seem to have more exciting careers, such as Cheesy's Day, Dirk, being an FBI agent. While watching news reports of a bank robber loose in town, and the police department having trouble catching him, Dave decides to take matters into his own hand to try to track and apprehend the robber himself. Unfortunately, The Chipmunks jump to conclusions and figure Dave to be the bank robber himself, and try to stop him. When they do so, they witness the real robber slipping away, while Dirk takes Dave in for questioning; it is revealed that Dirk is nothing more than the police department's IT guy, and that he was trying for a promotion to impress not only his son, but his colleagues as well. After Dave is cleared of the charges, he decides to let Dirk team up with him when he figures out the next bank the robber plans to hit.
76a	24a	"Lost in Space...Camp"	Michael Bagdasarian & Peter Saisselin	1 March 2019	June 11, 2019	323A 344	0.63
In an alternate storyline from "Suck Toad," we see Simon, Theodore, Jeanette, and Eleanor at space camp. Unfortunately, Theodore has a difficult time during his stay, between being separated from Simon - who was placed in a more advanced course than the others - and dealing with a bully who keeps harassing him after he ended up throwing up in an anti-gravity simulator. Unable to concentrate on his activities and exercises due to his misery, Theodore continually fails, and calls Alvin to have Dave come pick him up; upon hearing about his bullying problems, Alvin persuades Theodore to stand firm and show everyone what he's made of. Jeanette and Eleanor sneak Theodore into a spaceship simulator to help him get in a little extra practice, though the bully attempts to report them to the instructor. Realizing they accidentally slipped him into the advanced simulator, Jeanette and Eleanor enlist Simon to bring him back before they can be reported.
76b	24b	"Super Hot Chocolate"	Jeffery St. Ours	1 March 2019	June 12, 2019	323B 335	0.64
For a school bake sale, Alvin tries a new recipe for "Super Hot Chocolate," thinking that "super hot" means that it should be as scalding hot as possible. Unable to resist temptation, Theodore samples the hot chocolate, only to severely burn his tongue to the point that it disables his tastebuds, and Alvin learns that the "super" part of the recipe name meant astounding. Theodore falls into depression due to being unable to taste anything, and after he begins dressing in black, isolating himself, and describing his misery in poetic ways, he soon garners a cult following among the rest of the students, who suddenly seem him as a wise sage. Desperate to snap Theodore out of his depression, his brothers and The Chipettes inform him that he will be able to taste again when his tongue heals.
77a	25a	"The Great Chipmunk Detective"	Michael Bagdasarian	25 December 2018	June 13, 2019	325A	0.68
Miss Miller reports that the cases of cleaning solution she's bought from late-night shopping channels, among other items such as weightloss belts, and leprechaun glasses, have been stolen, but Officer Dangus doesn't take her plight seriously; because of this, Eleanor offers to figure out who the perpetrator is for Miss Miller, enlisting Theodore to assist her. Spying Dangus with boxes of the same cleaning solution, Eleanor and Theodore follow him on they presume to be another caper of his, only to discover that the boxes he has were purchased by his mother, and the real criminal strikes again during the wild goose chase. Dangus discourages them from continuing their investigation, but mystery notes threatening them only intensifies their desire to figure out who's responsible for the crime. They eventually discover Cheesy is the one swiping Miss Miller's items, but that he's working on orders for "Old White," refusing to divulge anymore information. On another stake-out, they saw Cheesy quitting, and discover "Old White" is Ms. Croner; when confronted, Ms. Croner reveals that she hated seeing Miss Miller waste her retirement money on such ridiculous frivolities, and was stealing to return them and get her money refunded. Eleanor, Theodore, and Ms. Croner come up with the solution to have Miss Miller lock up her phone in a small safe at night to resist the temptation to call and order anymore as-seen-on-TV items.
77b	25b	"Guitar Hero"	Janice Karman	26 December 2018	June 17, 2019	325B 349	0.58
Miss Smith must learn how to play the guitar in an incredibly short amount of time, and reluctantly asks Alvin to help teach her, but refuses to reveal why she must learn so quickly. Alvin has difficulty teaching Miss Smith, who has difficulty learning from him, prompting the two to go their separate ways, while Miss Smith seeks lessons elsewhere. Curious about the entire situation, Eleanor and Theodore do a little investigating, and learn that Miss Smith's mother's 90th birthday is coming up, and that she wants to learn to play the guitar as a present for her, because of a lifetime of being made to feel inferior to her more successful and accomplished older sister. When he learns the truth, Alvin becomes sympathetic and returns to Miss Smith, hoping to be a better teacher. When the party arrives, Miss Smith is incredibly nervous, but Alvin encourages her, so she performs her original new composition to her mother, expressing her love and gratitude for always being there for her, in spite of her sister's torment.
78a	26a	"The C Team"	Janice Karman	24 December 2018	June 18, 2019	326A	0.64
It is baseball season, but during try-outs, Coach Dobkins kicks Theodore, Jeanette, and several other students from the team for their lack of ability, and also kicks Eleanor off the team for defending them. Deciding to form their own team, they need the aid of someone to coach them; eventually, Miss Smith is enlisted as their coach, after Ms. Croner and Miss Smith are unable to coach them properly. They practice as much as they can in order to take on Coach Dobkins's team for the big game, and although their skills and abilities only improve marginally, their confidence is boosted - especially after Theodore is finally able to swing and hit a ball.
78b	26b	"Father Daughter Dance"	Janice Karman & Vanessa Bagdasarian	26 December 2018	June 19, 2019	326B 352	0.56
The Father-Daughter Dance is coming soon, and each of the Chipettes feel saddened for not having a father in their lives, but since Dave is the closest thing they have to a father figure, they each decide they want to ask him to the dance. The Chipmunks are under the impression that they will be unwillingly to share him with their sisters, so they plot to discourage them from asking him by convincing each of them he has nothing in common with them, or doesn't really know them that well, while also trying to persuade Dave to avoid each of them as much as possible. Seeing that this further saddens the Chipettes, the Chipmunks formulate a plan to secretly have Dave go out with each of them, while the other sisters are distracted, allowing him to spend time with each of them at the dance. Eventually, Dave tires, and slips away momentarily, all the while leaving each of the girls confused; after being invited by another classmate to share her father, they gladly accept, showing that they were willing to share a father figure all along.

=== Season 4 (2019–20) ===
No. overall	No. in season	Title	Written by	France air date	U.S. air date	Prod. code	U.S. viewers (millions)
79a	1a	"The Toy"	Janice Karman	26 August 2019	June 20, 2019	401A 402	0.72
It has been a year since Theodore lost his favorite toy on a rafting trip, but is surprised to discover a package has arrived with his lost toy inside: a doll of himself he had affectionately named "T2." In the following days to come, Theodore keeps discovering that T2 has moved from wherever he last left him, leading him to believe that T2 is actually alive, and moves on his own whenever nobody is looking. Theodore attempts stake-outs, along with his brothers, to try to catch T2 in the act, only to eventually discover that Jeanette had been the one moving T2 all along; she explains that she found T2, but he was severely damaged, and had the best doll repairman in the world to fix him up. A year later, the repair job had been fixed and T2 returned to Theodore, only for Jeanette to discover the shoe laces were the incorrect color; T2 being moved while nobody was looking was Jeanette attempt to replace the laces before Theodore noticed.
79b	1b	"Bloodline"	Janice Karman & Michael Bagdasarian	26 August 2019	January 5, 2020	401B 406	0.52
When the boys send Dave's DNA sample to a testing lab, the results show he's related to Jack the Ripper.: This segment has yet to air in numerous countries and territories - it is quite possible that the subject matter may be deemed too dark for the target audience.
80a	2a	"Theodore's Calling"	Janice Karman	27 August 2019	July 27, 2019	402A	0.78
Theodore feels left out because his brothers, Dave, and The Chipettes all have their own activities they participate in, leaving him all alone with nothing to do - something that doesn't go unnoticed by Ms. Croner, who informs him of a questionnaire to visit that will quiz him to figure out activities he's passionate about. Alvin eventually comes home early, and offers to help Theodore answer the questions, but answers them based on his own interests, leaving Ms. Croner confused to see the results indicate Theodore's passions lie in thrillseeking activities such as parasailing, sky-diving, acrobatics, and skiing - none of which Theodore clearly enjoys. An injury leaves Ms. Croner hospitalized, so Theodore decides to stay with and help her during her stay, revealing his real passion lies in caregiving.
80b	2b	"Clumsy Jeanette"	Peter Saisselin & Amy Serafin	27 August 2019	July 27, 2019	402B 407	0.78
Jeanette has been feeling rather blind, and going through an incredible clumsy spell, which results in her single-handedly shutting down a Chipmunks concert, followed by a series of mis-steps that include dropping glasses of water, walking into walls, and tripping over trashcans. Shortly afterwards, Simon begins experiencing similar episodes of clumsiness, which leads Alvin to believe that Jeanette's clumsiness is contagious, and cages the two of them until after their next concert, to prevent either of them potentially ruining it. While attempting to escape from their cage, they slip and mistakeningly put on each other's glasses, realizing their respective prescriptions were mistakeningly place in the wrong frames, which explains why they were having trouble seeing what they were doing.
81a	3a	"Adventures in Babysitting"	Janice Karman & Michael Bagdasarian	28 August 2019	August 10, 2019	403A 404	0.61
Alvin loses yet another bet to Bocarter, this time resulting in his having to babysit Neville. To get out of his loss, Alvin convinces Theodore to babysit him instead, which turns into a nightmare; with Bocarter gone for the afternoon, Neville soon begins getting into all sorts of mischief, from painting dinosaurs on his bedroom wall, to playing rough games with Theodore, to stealing his mother's jewelry from the parents' bedroom - and making sure its Theodore who is caught on camera doing it instead of him. When reviewing the security footage, and listening to Neville's lies, Bocarter is convinced that Theodore is a thief, and has him subdued until their parents return home for the evening to get a confession out of him, despite Theodore claiming innocence. Neville, meanwhile, doesn't want to lose his new playmate, so Theodore cuts a deal with him to tell his brother and parents the truth in exchange for freeing him, and he'll get him a new playmate: Alvin.
81b	3b	"Alvin's Assistant"	Michael Bagdasarian	29 August 2019	August 10, 2019	403B 403	0.61
Kevin dreams of becoming a D.J., so Alvin takes him under his wing to give him an inside look at the music industry... unfortunately, Alvin treats Kevin more like a servant than a protege, having him do all sorts of personal errands and chores for him. Dave decides to take over and really guide Kevin on the path to his dream, from showing him how to mix and record music, and setting up an appointment with a producer to listen to his demos. Meanwhile, Alvin feels betrayed by Dave, and that Kevin has taken his place in Dave's eyes, so he sabotages Kevin's music samples to blow his shot at getting an internship. Soon regretting his actions, Alvin races to help save Kevin's meeting, and after some repair work, Kevin's samples impress the producer enough to bring him on as an intern.
82a	4a	"Mysterions"	Bart Coughlin	29 August 2019	August 17, 2019	404A 409	0.77
Alvin and Simon have a secret club dedicated to their favorite science fiction/mystery TV series, Mysterions. Theodore ends up discovering the club, and also being a fan of the show, asks his brothers to join; initially they refuse, as Theodore cannot kept a secret, and they don't want him to spread the word of their Mysterions club, but Theodore vows to keep quiet and convinces his brothers to let him join. Unfortunately, Theodore does tell Cheesy, and word soon spreads among the rest of the students at school, who eventually crash the Seville house and enter what they believe to be a Mysterions-themed party being hosted by Alvin and Simon - both of whom are furious that Theodore ruined their secret club. Simon's attempts to get the rest of the kids to follow and adhere to club rules result in a rather dull and boring club, so Simon decides to let his guard down and let the kids return to their own festivities.
82b	4b	"The Crow Ate My Homework"	Janice Karman & Michael Bagdasarian	28 August 2019	August 17, 2019	404B 414	0.77
Wanting to go to a new water park with the rest of his family for the weekend, Alvin promises Dave to bring up his grades in school. Sure enough, after cramming in extra studying time and becoming totally immersed in his studies, Alvin miraculously receives an A− on his test, much to his joy and delight. He races home to show Dave his grade, but the shiny clip holding his test papers attracts a crow that snatches his test, and subsequently gets ripped to shreds during an ensuing fight with a falcon. Given Alvin's penchant for lying, exaggerating, and making up stories, Dave doesn't believe his claims of his high grade, or the crow stealing his test, and grounds him for the weekend (after being brought home by Officer Dangus when he catches him attempting to break into his classroom in order to get his grade to show it to Dave), while he takes his brothers to the water park. Depressed and heartbroken, Alvin harasses Miss Smith to vouch for him to Dave, and she does eventually agree to take him to the water park, if only to get him off her back.
83a	5a	"Simon Says"	Michael Bagdasarian, Peter Saisselin & Amy Serafin	30 August 2019	October 21, 2019	405A 412	0.48
Alvin gets fed up with Simon always putting a stop to his crazy schemes, accusing him of being an uptight killjoy; Simon argues that he has a responsibility to watch out for his brothers and make sure they don't hurt themselves. Wishing he could figure out a way to get Alvin to see that he's only looking out for their best interest, Simon is talked into conducting a social experiment, by going along with Alvin's various different schemes and stunts, figuring that he'll eventually see how much dangering he's putting himself and his brothers into. Unfortunately, Simon's experiment results in having just the opposite effect, as Alvin believes Simon has loosened up and is actually fun now. After being coerced into haphazardly designing and building a scale roller coaster, Simon finally confesses his true intentions to Alvin, but is too late to stop him from trying out their new roller coaster, which sends him flying into the air. Even after being severely injured, and in a body cast, Alvin still feels the need to continue engaging in dangerous, thrill-seeking stunts, much to Simon's defeat.
83b	5b	"Sing Like a Canary"	Janice Karman	2 September 2019	October 21, 2019	405B 411	0.48
Fed up with Alvin's endless, selfish, and entitled demands, The Chipmunks' publicist severs ties with them, prompting Alvin to pout and shun everyone until his demands are met - even if it means missing out on rehearsals and concerts. During one such rehearsal, Simon, Theodore, and Dave discover a bird named Lali, who can sing just as well as they can, and pretty soon, have her fill in for Alvin's absence to make him jealous so he would have to drop his demands. Lali ends up becoming an overnight sensation, and people all over the country become infatuated with her, much to Alvin's angered dismay, but he is too upset to admit his jealousy and keeps sticking to his list. As it turns out, Lali is actually somebody's missing pet bird, who just happens to be a Chipmunks fan, hence why she's able to sing their songs like they do, and her owners come to retrieve and take her home; Alvin sees this as his opportunity to reclaim his spotlight as the leader of the band, but only after Brittany finally convinces Alvin to drop his petty demands (without much success).
84a	6a	"Pirates Life"	Bart Coughlin	30 August 2019	October 22, 2019	406A 415	0.50
While dressed like pirates, and watching a pirate movie in their treehouse one stormy afternoon, The Chipmunks discover what appears to be an actual pirate's treasure chest having been delivered for Dave - and to make matters worse, a pair of pirates invade the Seville residence, claiming they want the treasure. In a panic, the boys try to fend off the pirates, and protect Dave's treasure, only to discover the treasure is actually a set of vintage pirate toys that Dave had once owned as a boy that he had purchased online on a bidding site; the two pirates were fellow enthusiasts Dave had met and befriended while engaging in a friendly bidding war with them, and they just wanted to see what the toys look like firsthand, in person.
84b	6b	"World Record"	Maryanne Contreras	2 September 2019	October 22, 2019	406B 410	0.50
The manager of a toy store offers up a new pair of virtual reality goggles as the big prize in a contest to promote the store, with the prize going to whoever can set a new world record. Everyone in town begins making all kinds of effort to set new records - something The Chipmunks and Chipettes use as a battle against each other to outdo the other's record attempts. After a series of failures, each side seems to have finally come up with what they believe will earn them the prize: Simon comes up with a long-range slingshot that will catapault Alvin from their house all the way into the pond in the park; Jeanette comes up with having giant pudding molds sculpted in her and her sisters' likenesses. When the big day comes, things get really sticky when Jeanette decides to set up their pudding molds right in the direct path of Alvin's flight path, ruining both of their efforts at setting a record and winning the prize.
85a	7a	"Tour Bus"	Janice Karman	27 September 2019	October 23, 2019	407A 420	0.45
Tired of Dave using his car to transport everything needed for their concerts, leaving very little room for any of them to travel comfortably, Alvin buys an old clunker of a bus, and after he, his brothers, and The Chipettes fix it up, they have a spectacular new tour bus for themselves. While Dave is impressed with their efforts, the sheer size of the bus intimidates him, and he resigns to sticking with using his car. Unfortunately, when leaving for another concert, Dave inadvertently leaves Alvin and Theodore behind at home, so the two decide to take their new bus down to the concert hall, using the auto-drive function that Simon and Jeanette had installed... however, because this function had not been properly tested, the bus loses control, and has to be chased down by the police.
85b	7b	"Game Show"	Janice Karman & Michael Bagdasarian	27 September 2019	October 23, 2019	407B	0.45
Feeling they could use some more television exposure, Alvin looks into booking him and his brothers on a popular game show, figuring any show would jump at the chance to having them. After a series of rejections, Alvin finally manags to get them booked on a little-known, low-viewership game show known as Boom!. The show features completely random, albeit useless trivia questions that have to be answered correctly by the participating audience, otherwise the boys have to take on incredibly dangerous - and even nearly fatal - stunts. As it would happen, nobody in the audience has the correct answers to any of the questions during the taping, and The Chipmunks decide to ditch the show before their last stunt involves them having to jump into fire pits that are shaped like the ridiculous rubber suits they're having to wear on the show.
86a	8a	"Alvin Management"	Bart Coughlin	30 September 2019	October 24, 2019	408A	0.43
A therapist is convinced that Dave has anger issues after listening to a series of stories where his various different wild antics cause him to lose his composure and yell at him unjustly. After spending some time at the Seville home, the therapist is further convinced that Alvin is just "a little boy being a little boy", and that Dave needs to learn to manage his anger. Wanting to prove her wrong, Dave starts spying on and recording Alvin intentionally disobeying his orders and instructions to show her Alvin's true colors. This, however, does nothing to convince her otherwise, that is until Alvin manages to blow up her office, causing her to finally snap and lash out at him, realizing Dave really isn't as crazy as she had dismissed him as being.
86b	8b	"Time Capsule"	Barbara Weber-Boustani, Peter Saisselin & Michael Bagdasarian	30 September 2019	October 24, 2019	408B	0.43
Mr. Dotson's drama class will be prematurely digging up the school's previous time capsule to bury a new one, and upon learning this, both Dave and Miss Smith panic, much to Alvin's suspicion. Figuring there's something they're trying to hide, Alvin ropes his brothers into an under-cover operation to get to the time capsule first to see what it is the two are trying to hide, figuring it might be something incredibly important. However, not only are they discovered by Dave and Miss Smith, it turns out what they were wanting to prevent from being discovered were a series of love letters and other tokens of admiration that were sent to a younger Miss Smith by a then-ten-year-old Dave; they were wanting to keep this personal between them, as well as save anyone else from being embarrassed from discovering these items.
87a	9a	"Munk vs. Machine"	Bart Coughlin	1 October 2019	October 25, 2019	409A	0.66
The Chipmunks and Chipettes enroll in a dodgeball tournament, but are upset to see that Bocarter's team is utilizing a number of devices to boost their own gameplay, including specialized intercepting goggles, and a mechanical, dodgeball-launching android. Angry about the opposing team's unfair advantages, Coach Dobkins otherwise finds nothing in the rule book that signifies that any of their tactics are illegal, and are permitted to play. In the meantime, Theodore discovers a pair of abandoned socks that he turns into puppets, but during a game, one of the puppets is knocked off of Theodore's hand, causing him to fly into a fit of rage as he pummels the opposing team with dodgeballs, and doesn't remember a thing after he calms down. Alvin and the others decide to use their to their advantage, and when Kevin weasels his way out of the team, they bring in Theodore as his replacement, goading the other team into knocking the puppet off of his hand, prompting him to fly into another fit of rage, once again pummeling the opposing team with balls, and winning the tournament for them.
87b	9b	"Shack Magic"	Michael Bagdasarian, Peter Saisselin & Amy Serafin	1 October 2019	October 25, 2019	409B	0.66
Theodore discovers a seemingly magical shack in the woods that bears all kinds of fancy gifts, such as gaming consoles, electronic devices, and other similar items that would be any kid's wish come true. Each and every day, whenever he, Alvin, Simon, Kevin, and Cheesy return to the shack, more and more of these good appear out of nowhere, though Simon is certain there's a more logical explanation for all of this, and enlists the help of Officer Dangus to get to the bottom of this. After witnessing the supposed magic for himself, Dangus is convinced that the shack isn't just magical, but also a portal being used by Santa Claus to store Christmas gifts as he travels. After gathering some of the items and bringing them down to the station for evidence, he and boys learn that the shack was being used as a hide-away by a pair of thieves who had been committing a string of robberies all throughout town, and were scared into turning themselves in, after discovering the very vague thank-you notes left behind by the boys they interpreted as threats from rival thugs who were out to get them.
88a	10a	"Big Bro Theodore"	Barbara Weber-Boustani & Peter Saisselin	2 October 2019	November 10, 2019	410A 421	0.83
When Theodore mistakenly thinks he's the oldest brother, he tries to be a better role model for Alvin and Simon.
88b	10b	"No Putts, No Glory"	Janice Karman & Michael Bagdasarian	3 October 2019	November 10, 2019	410B 424	0.83
Alvin tricks Theodore into believing he's great at mini golf, which backfires when Theo signs up for a tournament.
89a	11a	"Granny Awards"	Peter Saisselin, Amy Serafin & Michael Bagdasarian	2 October 2019	November 17, 2019	411A 417	0.67
Dave is thrilled when he thinks he's nominated for a Grammy, but it is actually an award for aging musicians.
89b	11b	"Sick Day"	Bart Coughlin	4 October 2019	November 17, 2019	411B 426	0.67
Alvin and Kevin pretend to be sick to miss school and sneak off to a convention.
90a	12a	"The Exchange Student"	Janice Karman & Michael Bagdasarian	3 October 2019	November 24, 2019	412A 423	0.65
When an exchange student comes to visit, he tells a scary story that make the Chipmunks think Dave is in danger.
90b	12b	"Crystal Ball Birthday"	Janice Karman & Michael Bagdasarian	4 October 2019	November 24, 2019	412B 428	0.65
Annie and Amber offer to plan Brittany's birthday party, pitting her against Jeanette and Eleanor in the process.
91a	13a	"Artsy Smartsy"	Bart Coughlin	2 March 2020	December 1, 2019	413A 416	0.70
Theodore helps Simon get past his perfectionism in order to complete an assignment for art class.
91b	13b	"The Crush"	Bart Coughlin	3 March 2020	December 1, 2019	413B 429	0.70
Simon has a crush on the babysitter and secretly prepares a romantic dinner while Theodore keeps Alvin distracted.
92a	14a	"Best in Shoe"	Janice Karman & Michael Bagdasarian	2 March 2020	December 8, 2019	414A 430	0.77
To land the lead role in a play, Alvin wagers Brittany that he can remain in character as a shoe cobbler.
92b	14b	"Royal Pain"	Vanessa Bagdasarian	3 March 2020	December 8, 2019	414B	0.77
When Brittany becomes convinced she's a long lost princess she carries her new royal status a little too far.
93a	15a	"Between a Rope and a Hard Place"	Janice Karman, Michael Bagdasarian & Peter Saisselin	4 March 2020	January 12, 2020	415A 432	0.60
Coach Dobkins kicks Cheesy and Theodore off the track team for being slow, but Theodore is determined to compete.
93b	15b	"World Day"	Janice Karman & Vanessa Bagdasarian	4 March 2020	January 19, 2020	415B	0.64
To celebrate “World Day” and win a trip, the Chipmunks each get a country to represent for a school presentation.
94a	16a	"Allergic Reaction"	Janice Karman, Amy Serafin & Peter Saisselin	5 March 2020	January 26, 2020	416A 433	0.39
Theodore develops an allergy to an unknown ingredient.
94b	16b	"Lice-enced to Teach"	Janice Karman & Bart Coughlin	6 March 2020	February 2, 2020	416B 436	0.60
After a lice outbreak closes the school, Dave sets up a classroom in the house and acts as the boy's teacher.
95a	17a	"Animal House Party"	Janice Karman	5 March 2020	February 16, 2020	417A 434	0.62
A wild party is planned by Derek when the brothers are set to be home alone for the weekend.
95b	17b	"Dr. Zap vs. Electroboy"	Bart Coughlin	23 March 2021	February 23, 2020	417B 438	0.67
Theodore is hit by lightning and believes he's like his comic book hero, until he's told he's actually a villain.
96a	18a	"Mega Bounce Battle"	Bart Coughlin	4 March 2020	March 1, 2020	418A 431	0.50
The boys disobey Dave's order to not play a dangerous game then have to hide their injuries when they get hurt.
96b	18b	"Gossip Guy"	Janice Karman, Michael Bagdasarian & Vanessa Bagdasarian	2 March 2020	March 1, 2020	418B 437	0.50
The school newspaper has a sudden increase in sales when a gossip column appears poking fun at other students.
97a	19a	"Chimpmania"	Janice Karman	6 March 2020	September 21, 2020	419A 405	N/A
Jeanette and the Chipmunks try to rescue a chimpanzee Bocarter keeps in a cage. NOTE: Features the song Friends from Little Alvin and the Mini-Munks.
97b	19b	"Dad Jokes"	Amy Serafin, Peter Saisselin & Michael Bagdasarian	15 March 2021	September 21, 2020	419B 444	N/A
Alvin is alarmed that Dave will be hosting an auction where he'll have to tell jokes because he's not that funny.
98a	20a	"The Chosen Chipmunk"	Janice Karman & Michael Bagdasarian	16 March 2021	September 22, 2020	420A 435	0.57
Alvin sneaks into Simon's new virtual reality game and is transported to a world in desperate need of a hero.
98b	20b	"Double Dangus"	Jeffery St. Ours	18 March 2021	September 22, 2020	420B 439	0.57
The Chipmunks discover Officer Dangus has a twin brother that's a bully and encourage Dangus to stand up to him.
99a	21a	"Last Day of Summer"	Michael Bagdasarian	10 March 2021	September 23, 2020	421A 440	0.46
Alvin wastes his entire summer playing a video game, then tries to do all the fun things he'd planned in one day.
99b	21b	"The Littlest Robot"	Janice Karman	11 March 2021	September 24, 2020	421B 451	0.61
Simon invents a robot with emotions and an ability to learn which backfires when he's exposed to the internet.
100a	22a	"You Troll"	Janice Karman	17 March 2021	November 7, 2020	422A 443	0.43
The Chipmunks try to keep Dave from getting on the internet after a performance he posts gets negative comments.
100b	22b	"Life of the Party"	Michael Bagdasarian	19 March 2021	November 7, 2020	422B 447	0.43
The Chipmunks along with Kevin and Cheesy decide to crash BoCarter's birthday yacht party after not being invited.
101a	23a	"Sick as a Chipmunk"	Jeffery St. Ours	18 March 2021	November 14, 2020	423A 446	0.46
After caring for a sick Brittany, Eleanor and Jeanette wonder if Brittany would care for them if they were sick.
101b	23b	"Instant Gram"	Janice Karman & Vanessa Bagdasarian	25 March 2021	November 14, 2020	423B 448	0.46
Dave gets an "Instant Gram" account and after several embarrassing posts, Alvin does all he can to stop him.
102a	24a	"Of Mice and Munks"	Janice Karman & Vanessa Bagdasarian	10 May 2021	November 21, 2020	424A 445	0.48
The Chipettes fall in love with a cute little mouse that's doomed to be fed to a snake as part of a science class.
102b	24b	"Simon Saves the World"	Bart Coughlin	10 May 2021	November 21, 2020	424B	0.48
Simon's new invention threatens to destroy the world, creating a time loop and changing gravity inside the house.
103a	25a	"Geizmo's Day Out"	Janice Karman	11 May 2021	February 22, 2021	425A	0.40
When Alvin kidnaps Simon's robot Geizmo, he gets a lesson parenting a child going through their terrible twos.
103b	25b	"Unbored"	Michael Bagdasarian	11 May 2021	February 22, 2021	425B	0.40
When Dave takes away Alvin's phone, the boredom Alvin experiences is enough to drive him crazy.
104	26	"A Very Merry Chipmunk"	Janice Karman	12 March 2021	December 12, 2020	426	0.49
Theodore is mistaken for an elf and whisked off to the north pole to help build toys in Santa's workshop. Cover Song: "Winter Wonderland"

=== Season 5 (2021–22) ===
No. overall	No. in season	Title	Written by	France air date	U.S. air date	Prod. code	U.S. viewers (millions)
105a	1a	"Deserted"	Janice Karman	23 August 2021	February 23, 2021	501	0.34
After Alvin gets detention again (for attempting to bribe Miss Smith into changing his grade after failing yet another test again, so that Dave wouldn't be upset about his bad grade), he's convinced that Dave will drive him to the desert and abandon him there.
105b	1b	"The Great Snack Off"	Michael Bagdasarian	24 August 2021	February 23, 2021	501	0.34
Alvin and Theodore play a seemingly innocent game, which leads to unexpected consequences.
106a	2a	"Unboxing Day"	Janice Karman & Vanessa Bagdasarian	25 August 2021	February 24, 2021	502	0.46
Alvin's attempts to earn money as an Internet influencer almost puts a local toy store out of business.
106b	2b	"Dave's Pavilion"	Janice Karman	26 August 2021	February 24, 2021	502	0.46
When the Chipmunks accidentally ruin Dave's new pavilion, they allow Miss Miller to take the fall.
107a	3a	"U-Fly"	Michael Bagdasarian	27 August 2021	February 25, 2021	503	0.38
Alvin's too short to ride an exhilarating new amusement park ride, so he devises a plan to sneak on afterhours.
107b	3b	"Yeti or Not"	Janice Karman & Michael Bagdasarian	31 August 2021	February 25, 2021	503	0.38
On a ski trip, Alvin convinces Theodore there's a yeti nearby, making life miserable for the rest of the family.
108a	4a	"Taken"	Bart Coughlin	26 August 2021	December 20, 2021	504	0.29
The boys' imaginations run wild as Dave disappears, when they find him they're convinced he's a zombie.
108b	4b	"The Flying Beast"	Janice Karman	31 August 2021	December 20, 2021	504	0.29
Alvin tries to convince Dave that he's being hunted by a flying beast, but it turns out to be a science project of Simon's.
109a	5a	"The Curse of MacBeth"	Michael Bagdasarian	27 August 2021	December 21, 2021	505	0.28
The Chipmunks don't want to perform in the school play, after learning of its curse.
109b	5b	"Zeela the Great"	Janice Karman	30 August 2021	December 21, 2021	505	0.28
Simon's robot Geizmo becomes jealous of Jeanette's robot Zeela, until a sudden tragedy reveals Geizmo's true heart.
110a	6a	"Dr. Sleep"	Michael Bagdasarian	16 September 2021	December 22, 2021	506	0.36
In an effort to be more productive, Simon invents a device that can override the need to sleep. But does it work?
110b	6b	"Davey Boy"	Janice Karman & Vanessa Bagdasarian	31 August 2021	December 22, 2021	506	0.36
Alvin gets a taste of his own medicine when he zaps Dave with a youth ray, turning him into an irresponsible teen.
111a	7a	"The Road Warrior"	Janice Karman & Michael Bagdasarian	17 September 2021	December 23, 2021	507	0.32
Alvin sounds the alarm when he believes Theodore has joined a motorcycle gang of vampires.
111b	7b	"My Fair Chipette"	Janice Karman	20 September 2021	December 23, 2021	507	0.32
When Brittany declines Alvin's help for a talent show, he convinces Jeanette to enter, putting them at odds.
112a	8a	"Gone Gal"	Janice Karman & Michael Bagdasarian	21 September 2021	March 11, 2022	508	0.28
When Miss Croner has a disagreement with Miss Miller, she fakes her disappearance to get even.
112b	8b	"Time Traveler's Party"	Michael Bagdasarian	23 September 2021	March 11, 2022	508	0.28
Simon tells Alvin time travel is impossible, until a man from the future shows up at their home.
113a	9a	"The House on Cedar Lane"	Janice Karman & Vanessa Bagdasarian	22 September 2021	March 18, 2022	509	0.33
When classmates claim a local haunted house isn't that scary, Alvin decides to prove them wrong.
113b	9b	"Bathroom Bully"	Peter Saisselin & Amy Serafin	24 September 2021	March 18, 2022	509	0.33
When Miss Smith praises Simon's grades in class, Derek bullies him by not allowing him to use the boys' bathroom.
114a	10a	"The Return of Thornbergaupht"	Vanessa Bagdasarian	27 September 2021	March 25, 2022	510	0.33
Simon's interactive videogame is about to take off, until Jeanette reprograms the game's villain.
114b	10b	"Squashed"	Janice Karman	28 September 2021	March 25, 2022	510	0.33
When Alvin dreams of joining a private club, he volunteers Dave to play squash, even though Dave doesn't play.
115a	11a	"Writer's Block"	Janice Karman	29 September 2021	April 1, 2022	511	0.24
When Dave suffers from writer's block, Alvin pretends to write a Broadway show, which only makes Dave feel worse.
115b	11b	"Jinxed"	Amy Serafin, Peter Saisselin & Michael Bagdasarian	30 September 2021	April 1, 2022	511	0.24
After Theodore sees Alvin accidentally ruin Dave's computer, Alvin jinxes Theodore so he won't be able to tattle.
116a	12a	"Fire Safety"	Michael Bagdasarian	27 October 2021	April 8, 2022	512	0.33
When the girls at school develop a crush on the Fire Marshal, a jealous Alvin decides to be a hero with disastrous results.
116b	12b	"Castle Catastrophe"	Janice Karman & Michael Bagdasarian	27 October 2021	April 8, 2022	512	0.33
After causing an accident at a historic castle, Cheesy and Alvin must work as reenactors to pay for the damage.
117a	13a	"The Party Animals"	Michael Bagdasarian	27 October 2021	April 15, 2022	513	0.28
Alvin books the band at a birthday party, only to discover they've been booked for the petting zoo - as the pets!
117b	13b	"Warren Seville"	Michael Bagdasarian, Peter Saisselin & Amy Serafin	28 October 2021	April 15, 2022	513	0.28
When Alvin tries to break Theodore's dependence on Talking Teddy, Theodore invents a new imaginary friend.
118a	14a	"Excavation Vacation"	Janice Karman	28 October 2021	June 6, 2022	514	0.26
When Simon falls ill, Alvin takes his place on a camping trip only to discover it's actually an archaeological dig.
118b	14b	"Trophy Dad"	Janice Karman	28 October 2021	June 6, 2022	514	0.26
The Chipmunks don't know what to do when they suspect Dave is lying about the various awards he's won.
119a	15a	"Skater Girl"	Michael Bagdasarian, Peter Saisselin & Amy Serafin	29 November 2021	June 7, 2022	515	0.23
Brittany hastily enters a skateboard contest against a skate park bully even though she has no clue how to ride.
119b	15b	"All Washed Up"	Janice Karman	29 November 2021	June 7, 2022	515	0.23
Complaints rise as Simon's robot Geizmo goes around town dismantling washing machines, but is he actually helping?
120a	16a	"Summer School"	Michael Bagdasarian	1 September 2022	June 8, 2022	516	0.21
To keep a planned vacation, the boys do all they can to stop Dave from learning that Alvin has summer school.
120b	16b	"Puzzled"	Michael Bagdasarian, Peter Saisselin & Amy Serafin	1 September 2022	June 8, 2022	516	0.21
When Theodore drops a puzzle piece down a floor vent, he gets trapped inside while trying to fish it out.
121a	17a	"Car Wars"	Vanessa Bagdasarian	2 September 2022	June 9, 2022	517	0.30
When the Chipmunks get stuck in traffic en route to a show, tempers flare between themselves and other drivers.
121b	17b	"Mr. Fix-It"	Janice Karman	2 September 2022	June 9, 2022	517	0.30
Simon gets annoyed with everyone asking him to fix things so he decides to play dumb until he gets a "thank you."
122a	18a	"Little Drummer Boy"	Amy Serafin, Peter Saisselin & Michael Bagdasarian	5 September 2022	June 13, 2022	518	0.24
When Alvin insists on playing the drums, Theodore fights back by mimicking Alvin and stealing his persona.
122b	18b	"Special Ingredient"	Amy Serafin, Peter Saisselin & Michael Bagdasarian	5 September 2022	June 14, 2022	518	0.32
As Theodore is perfecting a pancake recipe, Alvin plays a trick by pouring burping powder in his next batch.
123a	19a	"Alvin Gets Schooled"	Amy Serafin, Peter Saisselin & Michael Bagdasarian	6 September 2022	June 15, 2022	519	0.29
When Dave learns Alvin blamed him for his poor grades to Miss Smith, Dave sets down a very strict study schedule.
123b	19b	"My Life As a Dog"	Michael Bagdasarian, Peter Saisselin & Amy Serafin	6 September 2022	June 16, 2022	519	0.26
Theodore must pose as a dog after the Chipmunks accidentally shave the fur off a dog Miss Miller is dog sitting.
124a	20a	"Mr. Lou"	Janice Karman & Vanessa Bagdasarian	27 October 2022	June 20, 2022	520	0.26
Theo's funky art project becomes a star with its own social media fans, which is great until the page is hacked!
124b	20b	"Love Song"	Amy Serafin, Peter Saisselin & Michael Bagdasarian	28 October 2022	June 21, 2022	520	0.20
Dave writes a hit love song from a poem he found. Since Simon wrote the poem about his former crush Mandi, he panics his secret will come out.
125a	21a	"Bubble Wrap"	Janice Karman	27 October 2022	June 22, 2022	521	0.35
Alvin and Brittany wind up in a battle royale over popping acorn tops and bubble wrap.
125b	21b	"Chess Mate"	Michael Bagdasarian, Peter Saisselin & Amy Serafin	28 October 2022	June 23, 2022	521	0.31
When a cute girl joins the chess club, Alvin enlists Jeanette to teach him how to play so he can join as well.
126a	22a	"A Knight's Tail"	Michael Bagdasarian, Peter Saisselin & Amy Serafin	11 October 2022	June 27, 2022	522	0.27
When Eleanor discovers there are no female knights, she hides in a suit of armor and enters a knight competition.
126b	22b	"Dreambomber"	Peter Saisselin, Amy Serafin & Michael Bagdasarian	28 October 2022	June 28, 2022	522	0.18
Alvin is having the best dreams of his life, until Theodore subconsciously invades them.
127a	23a	"The Lifeguard"	Michael Bagdasarian, Peter Saisselin & Amy Serafin	1 November 2022	June 29, 2022	523	0.27
When Alvin and Eleanor train to be lifeguards, Theodore is passed over but later manages to save the day.
127b	23b	"Scare-Crowner"	Michael Bagdasarian, Peter Saisselin & Amy Serafin	1 November 2022	June 30, 2022	523	0.21
When Miss Croner's prized cherries go missing, she suspects crows - but could it be chipmunks?
128a	24a	"Run, Aimee, Run"	Janice Karman & Aimee Mullins	2 November 2022	March 4, 2023 (Nicktoons)	524	N/A
The Munks help a world-famous runner design a pair of prosthetic legs for a race she's set to run in.
128b	24b	"Theo vs. Simon"	Michael Bagdasarian, Peter Saisselin & Amy Serafin	2 November 2022	March 4, 2023 (Nicktoons)	524	N/A
Theodore embarks on a quest to find one thing he can do better than Simon, and realizes it won't be so easy.
129a	25a	"The Underground"	Michael Bagdasarian	3 November 2022	March 4, 2023 (Nicktoons)	525	N/A
Cheesy convinces Theodore and Alvin to help him steal the canteen's desserts through a secret network of underground tunnels.
129b	25b	"Game House"	Peter Saisselin, Amy Serafin & Michael Bagdasarian	1 December 2022	March 4, 2023 (Nicktoons)	526	N/A
Stuck at home during a storm, Simon invents a virtual reality game that quickly spirals out of control.
130a	26a	"The Dinner"	Peter Saisselin, Amy Serafin & Michael Bagdasarian	3 November 2022	March 4, 2023 (Nicktoons)	525	N/A
Alvin invites Dave's old high school rival over and embarks on an elaborate meal to prove to him that the latter is at the height of his glory.
130b	26b	"The Tour"	Michael Bagdasarian	1 December 2022	March 4, 2023 (Nicktoons)	526	N/A
Alvin can't wait to kick off the Chipmunks' world tour, until a heartbroken Theodore and later Alvin himself realize what (and who) they'll be leaving behind.
