= Lists of television episodes =

This is a list of lists of television episodes.

== General lists ==
- Lists of American children's animated television episodes
- Lists of American children's television episodes
- Lists of American comedy television episodes
- Lists of American crime television episodes
- Lists of American drama television episodes
- Lists of American non-fiction television episodes
- Lists of American sitcom episodes
- Lists of American television episodes
- Lists of anime episodes
- Lists of Australian television episodes
- Lists of British television episodes
- Lists of Canadian television episodes
- Lists of Philippine television episodes
- Lists of reality television episodes

== Lists by series or franchise ==
- Lists of Arrowverse episodes
- Lists of Astro Boy episodes
- Lists of Ben 10 episodes
- Lists of Big Brother episodes
- Lists of Case Closed episodes
- Lists of Casualty episodes
- Lists of Cosmos episodes
- Lists of CSI episodes
- Lists of Dallas episodes
- Lists of Doctor Doctor episodes
- Lists of Doctor Who episodes
- Lists of Doraemon episodes
- Lists of Inazuma Eleven episodes
- Lists of Knight Rider episodes
- Lists of MacGyver episodes
- Lists of One Piece episodes
- Lists of Pokémon episodes
- Lists of Powerpuff Girls episodes
- Lists of Saturday Night Live episodes
- Lists of Scooby-Doo episodes
- Lists of Shameless episodes
- Lists of Super Friends episodes
- Lists of Survivor episodes
- Lists of Teenage Mutant Ninja Turtles episodes
- Lists of The Office episodes
- Lists of The Outer Limits episodes
- Lists of The Twilight Zone episodes
- Lists of The Walking Dead episodes
- Lists of Transformers episodes
- Lists of Wait Wait... Don't Tell Me! episodes
