= Lists of Transformers episodes =

The following are lists of Transformers episodes:

- List of Transformers: Animated episodes
- List of Transformers: Armada episodes
- List of Transformers: Cybertron episodes
- List of Transformers: Cyberverse episodes
- List of Transformers: Energon episodes
- List of Transformers: Prime episodes
- List of Transformers: Rescue Bots episodes
- List of Transformers: Robots in Disguise (2000 TV series) episodes
- List of Transformers: Robots in Disguise (2015 TV series) episodes
- List of The Transformers episodes
- List of Beast Wars episodes
