= List of Powerpuff Girls Z episodes =

First DVD volume cover

Powerpuff Girls Z is a Japanese anime television series. It was directed by Iku Ishiguro and broadcast for 52 episodes from 2006 to 2007 on TV Tokyo.

Six theme songs were used for the series: two opening themes and four closing themes. The first opening theme is "Kibō no Kakera" (希望のカケラ; lit. 'Shards of Hope') by Nana Kitade, while the second theme is "Jig THE Upper" (ジグ THE アッパー, Jigu THE Appā) by Hoi Festa. The first ending theme is "Mayonaka no Door" (真夜中のドア, Mayonaka no Doa; lit. 'Midnight Door') by Liu Yifei, while the second ending is "LOOK" by Halcali. The third ending, "Tōriame" (通り雨, lit. 'Shower'), is sung by wiz-us. The fourth ending, "Himawari" (ひまわり, lit. 'Sunflower'), is sung by Hearts Grow.

== Episode list ==
No.	Title (Note: All English-translated Japanese titles are taken from the Collector's Edition DVDs.)	Directed by	Written by	Animation directed by	Art directed by	Original release date	English air date
1	"Powerpuff Girls to the Rescue" "Here Come the Girlz!" (Japanese: ガールズ、参上！)	Iku Ishiguro	Yoshio Urasawa	Mikine Kuwahara	Tadao Kubota	July 1, 2006	July 15, 2008
1	"The Secret of the Powerpuff Girls" "Here Are the Girlz!" (Japanese: ガールズ、誕生！)	Iku Ishiguro	Yoshio Urasawa	Mikine Kuwahara	Tadao Kubota	July 1, 2006	July 15, 2008
The Powerpuff Girls fight Mojo Jojo after he kidnaps kindergarten students in a cage and steal their candy. The origins of the Powerpuff Girls Z are revealed through the source of "Chemical Z".
2	"Bouncing Bubbles" "Bubbly Bubbles!" (Japanese: ほんわかバブルス！)	Iku Ishiguro	Saki Hasemi	Tomoya Hiratsuka	Midori Tanaka	July 8, 2006	July 16, 2008
Professor Utonium, his son Ken, Blossom, the Mayor, and Ms. Bellum and Poochi find Bubbles jumping cheerfully as she is attacked by Mojo Jojo and takes them in for research.
3	"And Then There Were Three" "Girlz Come Together!" (Japanese: ガールズ、結集！)	Directed by : Yuriko Kado; Storyboarded by : Shinobu Ookouchi	Yumi Kageyama	Shinobu Ookouchi	Tadao Kubota	July 15, 2006	July 17, 2008
Buttercup reluctantly joins the group but don't really wanna be 'bestie' with Blossom and Bubbles but the girls are put into the same class to make them get along to stop Mojo from hogging all the food in a restaurant if they want to being at time for lunch!
4	"All in the Family" "Girlz and Family Bonding!" (Japanese: ガールズ、家族の絆！)	Hidehito Ueda	Takashi Yamada	Tatsuya Oka	Yuri Takagi	July 22, 2006	July 18, 2008
The girls take turns being a mother figure to Ken, while Mojo plans to turn everyone into monkeys and his first victim is Ken!
5	"Mojo's Revenge" "Mojo's Revenge!" (Japanese: モジョの復讐だモジョ！)	Directed by : Keiichi Sugiyama; Storyboarded by : Iku Ishiguro	Yoshio Urasawa	Hiroaki Imaki	Tadao Kubota	July 29, 2006	July 21, 2008
5	"Climbing the Walls" "Observation Tower Crash!" (Japanese: 展望タワー・クラッシュ！)	Directed by : Keiichi Sugiyama; Storyboarded by : Iku Ishiguro	Isao Murayama	Tetsuya Saeki	Tadao Kubota	July 29, 2006	July 21, 2008
Angry with being teased at the zoo, Mojo attacks a fruit seller. Professor Utonium, Mr. Mayor, Ms. Bellum and the girls inspect the tall building which will become Mayor's Tower when Mojo tries to claim it to.
6	"Fuzzy Lumpkins" "Fuzzy Lumpkins!" (Japanese: ファジー・ラムキンス！)	Tetsuji Nakamura	Naoki Koga	Nobuyoshi Sasakado	Tomoko Yoshida	August 5, 2006	July 22, 2008
6	"Princess Morbucks" "Princess Himeko!" (Japanese: 姫子なプリンセス！)	Tetsuji Nakamura	Isao Murayama	Osamu Ishikawa	Tomoko Yoshida	August 5, 2006	July 22, 2008
Fuzzy Lumpkins keeps driving the girls and friends away while they try to enjoy a trip to the woods. Classmate Princess Morbucks (Himeko) is hit by the black Z-Rays and plots to outshine the Powerpuff Girls.
7	"Mayor for a Day" "Momoko's Love!" (Japanese: かなえ！ももこの恋)	Directed by : Takao Iwai; Storyboarded by : Takashi Sogabe	Isao Murayama	Masami Abe & Yōko Satō	Tadao Kubota	August 12, 2006	July 23, 2008
7	"The Infamous Amoeba Boys" "Evil Trio? Amoeba Boys!" (Japanese: 極悪トリオ？アメーバボーイズ！)	Directed by : Takao Iwai; Storyboarded by : Takashi Sogabe	Yōichi Takahashi	Yuuji Hakamada	Tadao Kubota	August 12, 2006	July 23, 2008
Blossom is given the task of being the bodyguard of her favorite TV hero, Johnny Cosmo when Mojo threatens him. The Amoeba Boys (now including a lady) attempt to become villains with little success.
8	"Sedusa" "Seductive Sedusa!" (Japanese: 魅惑の乙女！セデューサ)	Iku Ishiguro	Isao Murayama	Tomoya Hiratsuka	Yuri Takagi	August 19, 2006	July 24, 2008
A local shop owner and the Girl's friend, Annie is hit by black Z-rays turning her into the monster Sedusa! She attempts to glamour herself to win the heart of her friend Jason.
9	"Coach Buttercup" "Coach Kaoru's Spartan Soccer!" (Japanese: コーチかおるの特訓サッカー！)	Directed by : Yuriko Kado; Storyboarded by : Iku Ishiguro	Yōichi Takahashi	Shinobu Ōkōchi	Tadao Kubota	August 26, 2006	July 25, 2008
9	"Fuzzy in Love" "Fuzzy in Love!" (Japanese: 恋するファジー！)	Yuriko Kado	Yoshio Urasawa	Shinobu Ōkōchi	Tadao Kubota	August 26, 2006	July 25, 2008
Buttercup trains a young kid named Justin to become a better soccer player. After falling in love with Ms. Bellum, Fuzzy decides to take her back to the woods.
10	"Gigi the Great" "Charismatic Beautician Monster!" (Japanese: カリスマ美容師モンスター！)	Hidehito Ueda	Naoki Koga	TBA	TBA	September 2, 2006	July 28, 2008
The arrogant hairdresser Gilbert is hit by black Z-Rays and uses his power to hypnotize the customers to accept his eccentric hairstyle.
11	"Friends in High Places / Happy Birthday, New Townsville" "Princess Goes Outer Space! / Chase the Cakelifter!" (Japanese: 宇宙までプリンセス！ / ケーキ泥棒を追え！)	Tomoharu Katsumata	Yoshio Urasawa (part 1); Naoki Koga (part 2)	TBA	TBA	September 9, 2006	July 29, 2008
Friends in High Places: Believing Blossom, Bubbles and Buttercup are planning to show off, Princess follows them to unearth their plan. Happy Birthday, New Townsville: Mojo decides to steal all the cakes in the city.
12	"Bubbles' Troubles" "Bubbles in First Love" (Japanese: 初恋のシャボン玉)	Tetsuji Nakamura	Saki Hasemi	TBA	TBA	September 16, 2006	July 30, 2008
Bubbles reminisces about Cody a boy she met when she was six years old, who promised to meet her again someday, but he gets hit by a black Z-Ray and turns into werewolf.
13	"Mojo and the Amoeba Boys / Revenge of Negatron" "Amoeba Boys Learn from Mojo! / Revenge of the Camera Monster!" (Japanese: モジョに弟子入り！アメーバボーイズ / カメラモンスターの逆襲！)	Sumio Watanabe	Yoshio Urasawa	TBA	TBA	September 23, 2006	July 31, 2008
Mojo and the Amoeba Boys: Mojo decides to teach the Amoeba Boys how to become villains. Revenge of Negatron: A camera thrown away by the Mayor takes out his revenge by turning New Townsville black and white.
14	"Attack of the Gangreen Gang" "Gangreen Gang!" (Japanese: ギャングリーンギャング！)	Yoshito Hata	Yōichi Takahashi	TBA	TBA	September 30, 2006	August 1, 2008
The Gangreen Gang attempt to capture Buttercup during a big soccer match between the New Townsville Titans and the Cityville Colts.
15	"Fashion Action / The Way of the Noodle" "The Targeted Fashion Show! / Man of Honor! Ramen Monster!" (Japanese: 狙われたファッションショー！ / 男！ラーメンモンスター！)	Takao Iwai	Kento Shimoyama	TBA	TBA	October 7, 2006	August 4, 2008
Fashion Action: Mojo attacks a fashion show that Blossom and Bubbles are participating in. The Way of the Noodle: After a customer puts too much vinegar on the soup, black Z-Rays turns the soup into Noodlehead and forces people to eat noodles 'the right way', but the Powerpuff Girls Z are too full to stop him.
16	"Sleepless in New Townsville" "Woe! Secrets of the Princess" (Japanese: 哀れ！プリンセスの秘密)	Keiichi Sugiyama	Yumi Kageyama	TBA	TBA	October 14, 2006	August 5, 2008
The Powerpuff Girls find out why Princess Morbucks is showing off every night, costing them their sleep.
17	"Picture This / Revenge of Digitron" "Don't Miss the Photo-Op! / Brotherly Love! Electric Wave Monster" (Japanese: シャッターチャンスを逃すな！ / 兄弟愛！電波モンスター)	Yuriko Kado	Naoki Koga (part 1); Yoshio Urasawa (part 2)	TBA	TBA	October 21, 2006	August 6, 2008
Picture This: Ernie, the school newspaper's photographer, struggles to take a decent picture of the Powerpuff Girls. Revenge of Digitron: The Mayor's petty argument with his brother, the Principal, causes an electric wave monster to be created.
18	"The Mojo League of Evil" "Monster Tag Team Battle!" (Japanese: モンスター・タッグバトル！)	Hidehito Ueda	Isao Murayama	TBA	TBA	October 28, 2006	August 7, 2008
Mojo Jojo, Fuzzy Lumpkins, and the Gangreen Gang join forces to defeat the Powerpuff Girls.
19	"Practice Makes Pandemonium / Ms. Keane to the Rescue" "Lamenting Piano Lesson! / All Mighty! Ms. Keane" (Japanese: 哀しきピアノレッスン！ / 最強！キーン先生)	Sumio Watanabe	Yoshio Urasawa (part 1); Yōichi Takahashi (part 2)	TBA	TBA	November 4, 2006	August 8, 2008
Practice Makes Pandemonium: A piano hit by black Z-Rays terrorizes the town after being played poorly by Mojo. Ms. Keane to the Rescue: In order to not let their grades slip, Ms. Keane shoots down every excuse the girls have to fight Mojo.
20	"The Rowdyruff Boys" "Rowdyruff Boys!" (Japanese: ラウディラフボーイズ！)	Tetsuji Nakamura	Yoshio Urasawa	TBA	TBA	November 11, 2006	August 11, 2008
Using the Powerpuff Girls' DNA, his own DNA, along with Chemical Z, Mojo Jojo creates Brick, Boomer, and Butch, the Rowdyruff Boys, but the results are not what he expected!
21	"Quack-Quack Attack / Veggie Vengeance" "Rubber Duckie Monster! / Escape of the Hated Veggies!" (Japanese: プヨプヨアヒルのモンスター！ / 嫌われ野菜の大脱出！)	Yoshito Hata	Yumi Kageyama (part 1); Yoshio Urasawa (part 2)	TBA	TBA	November 18, 2006	August 12, 2008
Quack-Quack Attack: A boy's rubber duck is lost and hit by a black Z-Ray, and Poochi decides to take care of it. Veggie Vengeance: A group of vegetables take all the vegetables into space after no one eats them.
22	"Pastry Puff Panic" "Him the Ultimate Evil!" (Japanese: 最凶最悪のカレ！)	Yasunori Gotō	Takashi Yamada	TBA	TBA	November 25, 2006	August 13, 2008
A mysterious being (Him) sends a mummy to collect "white energy" from the Powerpuff Girls to escape from its prison While Mojo and the Powerpuff Girls are fighting for delicious snacks, the PastryPuffs.
23	"A Comedy of Terrors / Beetle Battle" "Love Tale of the Kabuki Monster! / Who Is the King of Insects!" (Japanese: 歌舞伎モンスター、恋の道！ / 昆虫王は誰だ！)	Takao Iwai	Yoshio Urasawa (part 1); Saki Hasemi (part 2)	TBA	TBA	December 2, 2006	August 14, 2008
A Comedy of Terrors: Him's particles transforms a comedian in a monster. Beetle Battle: With the help of Buttercup, Ken trains his pet beetle to defeat his rival in a beetle fighting tournament. But the opponent beetle gets hit by Him's particles.
24	"A Ken in Need, is a Friend Indeed" "Ken's Search for New Buddies!" (Japanese: ケンの友達探し！)	Hidehito Ueda	Yumi Kageyama	TBA	TBA	December 9, 2006	August 15, 2008
Professor Utonium sends Ken back to school and he's trying to make friends.
25	"The Write and the Wrong Way / Flower Power" "Prankster Stationary! / Roses, Noses & Hannah!" (Japanese: イタズラ文房具！ / 花・はな・ハナ！)	Iku Ishiguro	Kento Shimoyama (part 1); Saki Hasemi (part 2)	TBA	TBA	December 16, 2006	August 18, 2008
The Write and the Wrong Way: Bubbles' pencil and eraser are infected by Him's black spores. Flower Power: Him's spores infect a lonely flower, who begins to cover the town in flowers.
26	"All Ken Wants for Christmas" "Save Santa!" (Japanese: サンタさんを救え！)	Sumio Watanabe	Takashi Yamada	TBA	TBA	December 23, 2006	August 19, 2008
While the girls try to make Ken's wish true with the existence of Santa, Mojo decides to suck the Santas' into his machine. Including Mr. Mayor.
27	"Attack of the Sushi Monsters / Cat On a Hot Tin Poochi" "Make'em & Eat'em! Sushi Monster! / Peach and Sapphire!" (Japanese: 握って食べて！寿司モンスター！ / ピーチとサファイア！)	Yoshito Hata	Yoshio Urasawa	TBA	TBA	January 6, 2007	March 23, 2009
Attack of the Sushi Monsters: Him's spores infect a sushi-making machine, which creates a menacing group of sushi monsters. Cat On a Hot Tin Poochi: After Princess Morbucks is returned to her normal form, Sapphire stays behind and spends the night with Poochi.
28	"The League of Lovely Ladies" "Ladies Tag Battle!" (Japanese: レディース・タッグバトル！)	Tetsuji Nakamura	Naoki Koga	TBA	TBA	January 13, 2007	March 24, 2009
Princess, Sedusa, and Violet from the Amoeba Boys join forces to create havoc in New Townsville and plan to steal the Powerpuff Z's gold statue.
29	"Harmed to the Teeth / Beware the Hair" "Let's Go to the Dentist! / Saturday Powerpuff Fever!" (Japanese: 歯医者さんへ行こう！ / サタデー・パワパフ・フィーバー！)	Keiichi Sugiyama	Yōichi Takahashi (part 1); Kento Shimoyama (part 2)	TBA	TBA	January 20, 2007	March 25, 2009
Harmed to the Teeth: Blossom and Mojo go to the dentist after eating too many sweets. Beware the Hair: The girls encounter a Dancing Man when they go on a trip to a disco.
30	"What's With Him?" "Girlz and Him!" (Japanese: ガールズとカレ！)	Hidehito Ueda	Takashi Yamada	TBA	TBA	January 27, 2007	March 26, 2009
The origins of Him are revealed.
31	"Dunga Din / The Beanie Meanie" "Funta's Rolling Spirit! / Sedusa's Love Game!" (Japanese: フン太のコロガシ魂！ / セデューサの恋の駆け引き！)	Masatoshi Chioka	Yumi Kageyama (part 1); Mio Inoue (part 2)	TBA	TBA	February 3, 2007	March 27, 2009
Dunga Din: An ostracized dung beetle named Beetle Bob hit by black Z-Rays tries to impress a female bug named Beetle Betty. The Beanie Meanie: Annie becomes distracted when Jason temporarily leaves and uses her alter-ego to get him back.
32	"Two Burger-Bots and a Side of Fries" "Hooked on Momoko!" (Japanese: ももこに首ったけ！)	Sumio Watanabe	Yoshio Urasawa	TBA	TBA	February 10, 2007	March 30, 2009
A classmate of Blossom reveals his love for her.
33	"There's no "I" in Powerpuff / Keane Kong" "Momoko's Leaving Home! / Keane's Pity, Mojo's Piety!" (Japanese: ももこの家出とナポリタン！ / キーンの同情、モジョの愛情！)	Tetsuaki Matsuda	Kento Shimoyama (part 1); Yōichi Takahashi (part 2)	TBA	TBA	February 17, 2007	March 31, 2009
There's No "I" in Powerpuff: Tired of not being recognized as the leader, Blossom runs away with Spaghettihead who doesn't know his purpose. Keane Kong: Mojo convinces Ms. Keane to go on a date with him.
34	"Cleanliness is Next to Ghostliness" "The House Where Ghosts Live!" (Japanese: お化けが住む家！？)	Iku Ishiguro	Kento Shimoyama	TBA	TBA	February 24, 2007	April 1, 2009
Blossom and Buttercup spend the night at Bubbles' house.
35	"Weeding out The Monsters / The Dog Days of New Townsville" "We're Not Just Weeds! / Compassion Law for Monsters!" (Japanese: オレたちゃ雑草じゃない！ / モンスター、憐れみの令！)	Tomoharu Katsumata	Yoshio Urasawa	TBA	TBA	March 3, 2007	April 2, 2009
Weeding out The Monsters: A group of weeds terrorizes models when they aren't called by their names. The Dog Days of New Townsville: The spirit of a shogun possesses the Mayor then passes a law that allows all monsters to create havoc.
36	"It's All Because of Him" "Girlz Break Up!?" (Japanese: ガールズ、解散！？)	Keiichi Sugiyama	Takashi Yamada	TBA	TBA	March 10, 2007	April 3, 2009
Him uses Bubbles' doll Octi to break up the team.
37	"Super Tough Girls / Powerpuff Boys Z" "Manga Monsters Jump to Life! / Girlz Leave of Absence!" (Japanese: 飛び出すマンガのモンスター！ / ガールズ、休業！)	Sumio Watanabe	Isao Murayama (part 1); Naoki Koga (part 2)	TBA	TBA	March 17, 2007	April 6, 2009
Super Tough Girls: Him uses a comic drawer's talent to create not just monsters but the "Super Tough Girls" which became a hit. Powerpuff Boys Z: Professor Utonium, Ken, and Poochi save the day when the girls are forced to stay for the final exam.
38	"Enter the Entourage" "We Are the Torimakees!" (Japanese: ふたりはトリマキーズ！)	Iku Ishiguro	Isao Murayama	TBA	TBA	March 24, 2007	April 7, 2009
Him uses Princess' best friends to empower anyone they support.
39	"Little Ken's Big Wish / Wild Moon Chase" "Little Ken's Big Wish! / Girlz in Quarantine!" (Japanese: 小さなケンの大きな願い！ / ガールズ、飛行禁止令！)	Hidehito Ueda	Yoshio Urasawa (part 1); Mio Inoue (part 2)	TBA	TBA	March 31, 2007	April 8, 2009
Little Ken's Big Wish: Him grants Ken's wish to be bigger. Wild Moon Chase: After splitting the Moon in half, the girls are banned from flying.
40	"Babes in TV Land / The Legend of Princess Morbucks" "Girlz, TV, and a Big Present!?" (Japanese: ガールズとテレビとプレゼント！？)	Tetsuaki Matsuda	Yumi Kageyama	TBA	TBA	April 7, 2007	April 9, 2009
The Powerpuff Girls are chosen to star in a television series, meanwhile Mojo Jojo gets in a game show to try and take over the world, later backfiring and accidentally wears a costume for a show for children, in which he got taken by a producer and gets beaten by a child from the show. The girls are not amused with the television show they had a role in, since it actually has Princess Morbucks in a leading role.
41	"The Mighty Morbucks / Trading Faces" "Demashita! Shirogane Z / Girlz Interchange!" (Japanese: 出ましたっ！ シロガネーZ / ガールズ、転身！)	Tetsuji Nakamura	Saki Hasemi (part 1); Yumi Kageyama (part 2)	TBA	TBA	April 14, 2007	April 10, 2009
The Mighty Morbucks: Princess' older sister Duchess comes for a visit, with plans to outshine the Powerpuff Girls. Trading Faces: After getting hit by Fuzzy, the girls end up in each other's bodies.
42	"The Rowdyruff Girls" "Powerpuff Rowdy Boys!" (Japanese: パワパフ・ラウディ・ボーイズ！)	Sumio Watanabe	Kento Shimoyama	TBA	TBA	April 21, 2007	April 13, 2009
The Rowdyruff Boys use the Powerpuff Girls' clothes to taint their image.
43	"The Professor Gets His Cut / Who is Lucas Clark?" "Rescue the Kidnapped Scientists! / Liar Momoko's Disaster!" (Japanese: さらわれた博士たちを救え！ / ウソつきももこの災難！)	Hideki Takayama	Naoki Koga (part 1); Isao Murayama (part 2)	TBA	TBA	April 28, 2007	April 14, 2009
The Professor Gets His Cut: Him challenges the girls to retrieve three items for him if they want to see the Utonium family again. Who is Lucas Clark?: After telling Princess she has a "boyfriend", Blossom tries to bluff her way out.
44	"Buttercup's New Moves" "Kaoru Loves Biceps!" (Japanese: かおるは上腕二頭筋がお好き！)	Keiichi Sugiyama	Takashi Yamada	TBA	TBA	May 5, 2007	April 15, 2009
Buttercup falls for a wrestler when trying to see her fathers face at a wrestling match.
45	"Hoppily Ever After / Vamp on Campus" "Momoko and the Frog Prince! / The Day Sedusa Disappears!?" (Japanese: ももことカエルの王子様！ / セデューサが消える日！？)	Hidehito Ueda	Yoshio Urasawa (part 1); Yumi Kageyama (part 2)	TBA	TBA	May 12, 2007	April 16, 2009
Hoppily Ever After: Blossom lets her emotions get the better of her when she meets a frog prince. Vamp on Campus: After mistakenly believing Jason is going out with his professor, Annie turns into Sedusa again and goes on a rampage.
46	"Return of Him" "Danger!? Girlz vs Him!" (Japanese: 絶体絶命！？ガールズVSカレ！)	Tetsuaki Matsuda	Takashi Yamada	TBA	TBA	May 19, 2007	April 17, 2009
After failing to injure them when in their normal states, Him confronts the girls for battle.
47	"Keane For a Break / Like Giving Candy to a Baby" "Mojo and Keane's Romantic Journey! / Here Come the Powerpuff Kids!" (Japanese: 旅は道連れ、モジョとキーン！ / いきなり登場！パワパフキッズ！)	Yasunori Gotō	Yoshio Urasawa	TBA	TBA	May 26, 2007	April 20, 2009
Keane For a Break: Ms. Keane accompanies Mojo on a trip to a hot spring. Like Giving Candy to a Baby: Him turns the Powerpuff Girls into toddlers through lollipops.
48	"Bubbles and the Beast" "The Miracle of Bubble Freedom" (Japanese: シャボン・フリーダムの奇跡)	Sumio Watanabe	Saki Hasemi	TBA	TBA	June 2, 2007	April 21, 2009
The girls find Bubbles' childhood friend Cody and help him overcome his problem of being a beast.
49	"The Happy Thought Blaster / Nurse Curse" "All or Nothing!? Love-Love Beam! / Mojo's Day at the Hospital!" (Japanese: 一撃必殺！？ラブラブビーム！ / モジョのナースな一日！)	Hideki Takayama	Yōichi Takahashi (part 1); Takashi Yamada (part 2)	TBA	TBA	June 9, 2007	April 22, 2009
The Happy Thought Blaster: Professor Utonium teaches the girls a new move to combat Him's pure evil through love. Nurse Curse: After hurting himself, Mojo prolongs his hospital stay when he falls in love with nurse.
50	"Him's Big Plan" "PPGZ Knock-Out Union!" (Japanese: 打倒ガールズ協同組合！)	Hidehito Ueda	Yoshio Urasawa	TBA	TBA	June 16, 2007	April 23, 2009
Under the direction of Him, the monsters get together to defeat the Powerpuff Girls.
51	"Only a Matter of Time" "Girlz, Beyond Time and Space!" (Japanese: ガールズ、時空を超えて！)	Masatoshi Chioka	Takashi Yamada	TBA	TBA	June 23, 2007	April 24, 2009
The girls use Professor Utonium's latest invention to time travel and discover Him's weakness.
52	"The Final Battle" "The Girlz' Final Battle!" (Japanese: ガールズ、最後の戦い！)	Iku Ishiguro	Yoshio Urasawa	TBA	TBA	June 30, 2007	April 27, 2009
In a final confrontation, the girls must stop Him from destroying New Townsville in a volcanic eruption, but to do that, all of them, including Poochi, have to give up their Z-Rays.

== See also ==
- Lists of Powerpuff Girls episodes
