= List of Ben 10 episodes =

The following are lists of Ben 10 episodes:

- List of Ben 10 (2005 TV series) episodes
- List of Ben 10: Alien Force episodes
- List of Ben 10: Ultimate Alien episodes
- List of Ben 10: Omniverse episodes
- List of Ben 10 (2016 TV series) episodes
