= List of The Walking Dead (franchise) episodes =

The following are lists of episodes in The Walking Dead franchise.

- List of The Walking Dead episodes
- List of Fear the Walking Dead episodes
- List of The Walking Dead: World Beyond episodes
- List of Tales of the Walking Dead episodes
- List of The Walking Dead: Dead City episodes
- List of The Walking Dead: Daryl Dixon episodes
- List of The Walking Dead: The Ones Who Live episodes

== See also ==
- List of Talking Dead episodes
