= Lists of Shameless episodes =

The following are lists of episodes from the Shameless series:

- List of Shameless (British TV series) episodes, a British comedy-drama series
- List of Shameless (American TV series) episodes, an American remake
