= List of Cosmos episodes =

The following are lists of episodes from the Cosmos series:

- List of Cosmos: A Personal Voyage episodes, which first aired in 1980.
- List of Cosmos: A Spacetime Odyssey episodes, which first aired in 2014.
- List of Cosmos: Possible Worlds episodes, which first aired in 2020.
