= List of Doctor Doctor episodes =

The following are lists of Doctor Doctor episodes:

- List of Doctor Doctor (American TV series) episodes
- List of Doctor Doctor (Australian TV series) episodes

== See also ==
- Doctor Doctor (South Korean TV series)
