= Lists of Powerpuff Girls episodes =

This is a list of lists of Powerpuff Girls episodes:

- List of The Powerpuff Girls episodes
- List of Powerpuff Girls Z episodes
- List of The Powerpuff Girls (2016 TV series) episodes

== See also ==
- List of Powerpuff Girls characters
