= List of Scooby-Doo episodes =

These are lists of Scooby-Doo episodes:

- List of Scooby-Doo, Where Are You! episodes
- List of The New Scooby-Doo Movies episodes
- List of The Scooby-Doo Show episodes
- List of A Pup Named Scooby-Doo episodes
- List of What's New, Scooby-Doo? episodes
- List of Shaggy & Scooby-Doo Get a Clue! episodes
- List of Scooby-Doo! Mystery Incorporated episodes
- List of Be Cool, Scooby-Doo! episodes
- List of Scooby-Doo and Guess Who? episodes
