= List of Transformers: Energon episodes =

The following is a list of episodes of the Transformer series Transformers: Energon, the second series of the Unicron Trilogy.

== Episodes ==
The series consists of a single season of 51 episodes.

No.	Title	Original release date	English air date
1	"Ascend! Ocean City (Cybertron City)"; Transliteration: "Fujō! Ōshan Shiti" (Japanese: 浮上!オーシャンシティ)	January 9, 2004	January 31, 2004
Ten years have passed since Transformers: Armada. The Autobots and Decepticons work side by side with humans to harvest Energon. But trouble is brewing with recent attacks by a group of transformers known as Terrorcons. Can the Autobots meet the threat?
2	"Shine! Energon Star (Energon Stars)"; Transliteration: "Kagayake! Enerugon Sutā" (Japanese: 輝け!エネルゴンスター)	January 16, 2004	February 7, 2004
After analyzing the Terrorcon threat, the Autobots decide to send away all the civilians living in the energon mining bases. Ironhide is given the job of "babysitting" Kicker, neither one is happy about it. The alarm goes off for an attack on Lunar City, Kicker and Jetfire go ahead and the others soon follow after being given energon stars by the Omnicons. When they get there, Ironhide heads off to check the mine and touches some energon by mistake which knocks him out. The others rescue him and they head back to Ocean City. The episode ends with Alpha-Q saying Optimus Prime will meet his match when Scorponok awakens.
3	"Megazarak's Trap (Scorponok)"; Transliteration: "Megazarakku no Wana" (Japanese: メガザラックの罠)	January 24, 2004	February 14, 2004
Scorponok captures Tidal Wave and made him to follow his orders so that they can revive Megatron with energon. While Kicker and Ironhide stay behind (supposedly) while the rest of the team help Desert City...
4	"Megatron's Proof (Megatron's Sword)"; Transliteration: "Megatoron no Akashi" (Japanese: メガトロンの証)	January 30, 2004	February 21, 2004
Tidal Wave sees Megatron's Sword.
5	"New Cybertron City (The New Cybertron City)"; Transliteration: "Aratana Saibatoron Shiti" (Japanese: 新たなサイバトロンシティ)	February 6, 2004	February 28, 2004
Kicker has a dream of Energon being spotted in the mountains and wakes up the next morning. He finds the exact match of the mountains on-line. On Cybertron, Dr. Jones and Rad send the parts of Super Optimus to Optimus Prime after they were repaired. Inferno tells Optimus Prime that an Energon reconnaissance team is in the mountains Minutes later, while Kicker and Grindor are out searching, Hot Shot, Ironhide, and Demolisher help Strongarm with the equipment to help them find the Energon. Ironhide goes into a fight with Demolisher about if Demolisher switched sides. The Terrorcons deposit their latest Energon onto the wrecked Unicron. Tidal Wave and Cyclonus see Megatron deactivated on the wall. Alpha Q gives orders to Scorponok, Cyclonus, and Tidal Wave to gather more Energon to revive Megatron and restore Unicron. Back at Ocean City, Optimus Prime tells Jetfire not to bring up why they sent Demolisher with Hot Shot, Ironhide, and Strongarm. Back at the mountain, Kicker notices the fog coming in and Hot Shot contacts Kicker to return to camp right before Kicker and Grindor fall into a ravine. Hot Shot notices that Kicker hasn't return and sends Demolisher with Ironhide to find him while Strongarm watches over the camp. In the ravine, Kicker has a dream about his past when he and his family had to stop on a planet to find Energon before returning to Earth. When in their excavating machine, Kicker senses the Energon and they dig for the Energon with the help of the Omnicons. When a sandstorm hit, he stood near his father. Kicker wakes up and finds out he's trapped. He and Grindor try many escapes from the ravine until Hot Shot contacts him and Kicker tells Hot Shot where he is. Hot Shot tells Strongarm to help Kicker. Kicker senses Energon in the ravine. Cyclonus and Tidal Wave arrive with the Terrorcons and they start attacking. Cyclonus' shot causes an avalanche burying Hot Shot and sending some snow into the ravine. Strongarm finds the ravine and uses a machine with attachable poles on them. Kicker uses the snow to escape right after Cyclonus and Tidal Wave noticed Strongarm. In the nick of time, Optimus Prime arrives with Inferno and tells everyone to fall back. The Battle Ravages start digging for the Energon. Dr. Jones and Rad send a new Cybertron development to the location with the help of Jetfire. The arrival of the development crushes some of the Divebombs and Battle Ravages. The Autobots, Strongarm, Demolisher, and Kicker see the new Cybertron City called Blizzard City. Just then, Scorponok arrives with reinforcements and tells Cyclonus and Tidal Wave to get the Energon. The city's cannons attack the Divebombs and we see Skyblast and Signal Flare on the base. This attack caused the Decepticons and surviving Terrorcons to retreat. Demolisher wonders that if Megatron is alive, why hasn't he come for him. Kicker is glad that his father is helping out, even though he's not with them.
6	"Resurrection! Galvatron (Megatron Resurrected)"; Transliteration: "Fukkatsu! Garubatoron" (Japanese: 復活! ガルバトロン)	February 13, 2004	March 6, 2004
Megatron is back alive again. Megatron forces Scorponok to serve him, but Scorponok is loyal to only one master Alpha Q.
7	"Destron Invasion (Megatron's Raid)"; Transliteration: "Desutoron Shūrai" (Japanese: デストロン襲来)	February 20, 2004	March 13, 2004
Megatron launches his first Energon raid since his resurrection. Demolishor, who has recently had doubts about working with the Autobots, is faced with a choice when Megatron confronts him. Ultimately Demolishor betrays the Autobots and rejoins the Decepticon cause. Meanwhile Alpha Q has revived Starscream, who has no memory of who he used to be. Starscream is revealed to have the ability to turn invisible when he battles Optimus Prime in combat.
8	"Mysterious Assassin Nightscream (Starscream the Mysterious Mercenary)"; Transliteration: "Nazo no Asashin Naitosukurīmu" (Japanese: 謎の暗殺者 ナイトスクリーム)	February 27, 2004	April 9, 2004
Alpha Q has revived Starscream, whose mission is to destroy Optimus Prime, so as to regain a new body. He has the power to make himself invisible.
9	"Asteroid Belt's Death Fight (Battle of the Asteroid Belt)"; Transliteration: "Asuteroido Beruto no Shitō" (Japanese: アステロイドベルトの死闘)	March 5, 2004	April 9, 2004
The Autobots go into the asteroid belt to see what is going on after seeing something on radar, and find parts of Unicron. The Decepticons attack Lunar city. Kicker is troubled with old fears of being alone in space. The idea of Energon towers is proposed by Kicker's father.
10	"Appearance! Energon Tower (Energon Tower)"; Transliteration: "Shutsugen! Enerugon Tawā" (Japanese: 出現! エネルゴンタワー)	March 12, 2004	April 9, 2004
Megatron gets a better sword that does much more damage than the one the Autobots have. The remains of Unicron are finally shown and then the Decepticons attack Ocean City only to discover that the Autobots have an energon tower which activates during the battle. The energon tower destroys all the Terrorcons and causes pain for the Decepticons. Megatron pulls out.
11	"Small Universe (The Legend of Rodimus)"; Transliteration: "Chippai Uchū" (Japanese: ちっぽけな宇宙)	March 19, 2004	April 9, 2004
Alpha Q prepares to bring Unicron to life, while yet another Energon Tower is secured into place. Below the city, Kicker searches for more energon with Ironhide, but has trouble because of a similar experience during his childhood which was caused on an energon expedition with his father. Kicker felt his father was more concerned with finding energon than his safety, and he'll never forgive him for it. Ironhide tells Kicker that he should respect his father and to punctuate his point, he tells Kicker about a legendary transformer named Rodimus, who was an inspirational leader that rallied a group of Autobots to escape the war and create a new world. He then leaves Kicker to fend for himself and confront his fears. While making his way through the dark, Kicker finds the energon, and shortly afterward Ironhide returns, saying it was merely through luck. Meanwhile at Megatron's base, Megatron prepares to recharge and attack Earth, while Scorponok abandons his leader and seeks energon on Mars which is unprotected by an energon grid, but finds himself unaware that Rodimus and his team is watching him. Megatron is attacked by Starscream, but adequately defends himself by imprisoning him in a black pit. He then breaks Starscream into a loyal Decepticon, while on Mars, Rodimus prepares to make his move.
12	"Jungle City's Crisis (Crisis in Jungle City)"; Transliteration: "Janguru Shiti no Kiki" (Japanese: ジャングルシティの危機)	March 26, 2004	June 18, 2004 (Canada); June 29, 2004 (USA)
Kicker and Misha arrive in Jungle City, where helicopters come to complete the energon tower. But Alpha Q is not ready to let Earth go without a fight, and sends a group of stealth Terrorcons, named Command Ravage and Blackout. Unfortunately for him, both Kicker and Tidal Wave notice the Terrorcons, who are tunneling to avoid the base's defenses. In response, the Decepticons arrive via space bridge, and the energon mine and human allies are evacuated, but not before Misha requests that the pyramids near the city be protected. A battle royale ensues between the Terrorcons, the Decepticons, and the Autobots. Between both evil factions, the Autobots are overwhelmed, and the Energon Tower and base is overrun and destroyed. The Autobots escape, but overflow the Energon Tower and blast it, which explodes and decimates the base and the pyramids, and kills the Terrorcons. The Decepticons retreat, and Kicker and Misha mourn for Jungle City, but Kicker senses the next location for an energon tower: Lunar City!
13	"Targeted Kicker (Kicker Beware!)"; Transliteration: "Nerawareta Kikkā" (Japanese: 狙われたキッカー)	April 2, 2004	June 25, 2004 (Canada); June 30, 2004 (USA)
Megatron forces Demolishor to divulge the Autobots' secret of finding energon: Kicker. Scorponok interrupts with news that a Battle Ravage drone was captured by the Autobots and transferred to Lunar City, and no doubt are searching for energon. Alpha Q manifests a fourth personality which takes charge and orders Scorponk to capture Kicker. On the Moon, Kicker pretends to search for energon, but really knows there is none, but there is something alive on the barren world. On their journey, Kicker runs into Demolishor, under orders to kidnap Kicker with a group of Terrorcons. Optimus attempts a rescue, but is ambushed by the other Decepticons, while Rodimus and his team debate over interfering. Kicker refuses help from Ironhide and decides to go under capture, hoping to spy and find information on Alpha Q, who does contact him through a Terrorcon while simultaneously using Scorponok to destroy both factions, although Scorponok's attempts are unsuccessful. However, the tide soon changes as Lunar City, along with a large group of Omnicons, is revealed to be intact, enabling an energon grid which defeats the Decepticons and Terrorcons. In the retreat, Demolishor attempts a last-ditch effort to kidnap Kicker, but a mysterious shot forces him to escape. Cyclonus is injured, and is repaired into Snow Cat, a more agile transformer with a polar vehicle alternate mode.
14	"Energon Grid Activated (Energon Grid)"; Transliteration: "Enerugon Guriddo Hatsudō" (Japanese: エネルゴングリッド発動)	April 9, 2004	July 1, 2004
Megatron has taken yet another plan, to create three meteors from Unicron and propel them at Earth before the energon grid has been completed, which he feels will "strike fear in Optimus Prime." On Mars City, Carlos notifies Optimus, but Dr. Jones notices Desert City's Energon tower has a fault, rendering the Energon Grid useless. Kicker and the Autobots attempt to find the fault, which is a group of Blackout drones. Meanwhile, the comets enter Earth's atmosphere, but one is destroyed by Rodimus, aided by more mysterious Blackout drones. Kicker solves the problem, and allows the towers to engage the Energon Grid, which destroys the other two comets. After a scene of "fireworks" created by the comets, the Blackout drones Kicker found are rescued by a strange ship, from Cybertron. Ironhide and Kicker argue over going after the ship, but Ironhide ends the argument after revealing he put a tracking device on one of the Terrorcons. Meanwhile, Alpha Q questions his actions of saving Earth.
15	"Is It an Enemy? Are You on Your Side? Rodimus Convoy (Rodimus: Friend or Foe?)"; Transliteration: "Teki ka? Mikata ka? Rodimasu Konboi" (Japanese: 敵か? 味方か? ロディマスコンボイ)	April 16, 2004	July 2, 2004
While Snow Cat tests his power against the Energon Grid by sending frozen asteroids, Megatron decides to go after Alpha Q instead of Earth after finding a Terrorcon spy. On Earth, the Autobots celebrate the Energon Grid, but Optimus calls a conference, telling him the Autobots will have to move their battle into space to defeat Unicron and the Decepticons. Outside, Hot Shot races out on a space bridge after receiving a secret message from Rodimus. He arrives on Mars, but runs into Scorponok and his Terrorcons attempting to collect Energon. Rodimus appears, and tells Hot Shot to not fire on the Alpha Q-allied bot, who escapes. Hot Shot questions Rodimus's actions, and is shocked that Rodimus says Unicron must be revived. During their discussion, Ironhide, Kicker, and Skyblast arrive to back up Hot Shot, who refuses to revive Unicron or assist Rodimus. Rodimus decides to open fire, then escapes. Ironhide follows him, but Rodimus leads him into a trap, powerlinking with Prowl and defeating him, while trying to alliance with Kicker. Ironhide is rescued by Hot Shot, but doubts his actions at opening fire at his superior. Hot Shot says even Optimus would probably open fire in his situation, and thanks him. Meanwhile, Megatron uses Scorponok as bait to bring out Alpha Q......
16	"Aim! Unicron (Go for Unicron!)"; Transliteration: "Mezase! Yunikuron" (Japanese: めざせ! ユニクロン)	April 23, 2004	July 3, 2004
Carlos reports the locators on the two Terrorcons have concluded that the enemy has two bases (Megatron and Alpha Q), while Megatron's plan doesn't succeed as Team Rodimus comes to rescue Scorponok, making quick work of the Decepticons. After the report, Dr. Jones is unveiling a new starship to increase energon production, named the Miranda II. Optimus reveals their mission is twofold: they are also going to destroy Unicron, and they prepare to set up a space bridge. Unfortunately, the Decepticons attack, and part of the space bridge is damaged. Skyblast attempts to repair the damage, but is hit. Kicker volunteers to help, and after getting used to zero-gravity, repairs the space bridge. To end the Decepticon attack, the Autobots deploy an energon shield around the ship and escape back into the ship, but Demolisher is destroyed. The Miranda II flies off into uncharted regions of space, while Ironhide is shocked by Demolisher's demise. However, his spark remains, and Megatron decides to use it.
17	"Dinobot is Falling (The Return of Demolishor)"; Transliteration: "Dainobotto ga Futte Kuru!" (Japanese: ダイノボットが降ってくる!)	April 30, 2004	July 3, 2004
The Autobots dock their ship near a mysterious blizzard planet, which Kicker senses Energon on. But the Autobots face a new threat: for Demolisher is revived in a new Power, who is tougher than ever However, Tidal Wave interrupts, with Elliot Moose reporting the Autobots' location. On the blizzard planet, the Miranda II is stuck between glaciers, unable to escape, so two groups are deployed: one to get the energon, the other to free the ship. Unfortunately, Megatron is in pursuit, assisted by the upgraded Demolisher. along with Kicker escape, and even though they couldn't collect the energon, Optimus tells Kicker his teammates are more important than energon and the blizzard planet is destroy by the decepticons.
18	"Showdown! Two Convoy (A Tale of Two Heroes)"; Transliteration: "Taiketsu! Futari no Konboi" (Japanese: 対決! ふたりのコンボイ)	May 7, 2004	July 3, 2004
The Autobots continue on their journey and intercept a Decepticon warp signal which turns out to be Rodimus's ship. Rodimus asks permission to aboard and Optimus obliges, Rodimus explains to Optimus his theory of letting Unicron be resurrected, but Optimus doesn't agree so Rodimus leaves the ship so both teams can get back to their missions. Kicker finds Ironhide out of the ship and asks him what's up, Ironhide tells him that he wants to see what he is truly capable of doing and that he is tired of being bossed around, Kicker agrees and lets Ironhide board Rodimus's ship who by the way knows Ironhide is aboard but rather encourages Ironhide to be adventurous and tells his team to calm it down while Rodimus's ship goes into Unicron to talk to Alpha Q......
19	"Fear! Unicron Start (Battle Stations)"; Transliteration: "Kyōfu! Yunikuron Shidō" (Japanese: 恐怖! ユニクロン始動)	May 14, 2004	July 3, 2004
The Autobots continue their planning on taking out Unicron. They try to go into Unicron and blow him up internally but don't succeed because Unicron is coming back to life so his defenses are back too. The Autobot ship barely makes it out of their tight situation with a few damages to the ship. Optimus plans to lure Unicron through a returning space bridge but Tidal Wave, Snow Cat, the new Demolisher, and Star scream are hot on their heels, all the Decepticons (including Unicron) and Autobots make it through the space bridge and the camera shifts to Alpha Q, and Rodimus and his team in Unicron's separated head. Ironhide mentally calls Kicker and Kicker orders Strongarm to drop him off to help Ironhide. Misha follows Kicker, along with Grindor and the Autobots find a way with Rad's help to do some good damage on Unicron who with Megatron and the other Decepticons manages to get away with a warp field. Kicker, Grindor and Misha board Rodimus's ship after Rodimus tells the kids and the Minicon that Ironhide told him to pick them up.
20	"Alpha Q its True Identity (Alpha Q: Identity)"; Transliteration: "Arufa Q Sono Shōtai" (Japanese: アルファQその正体)	May 21, 2004	July 3, 2004
Unicron's arrival causes the Decepticons on Cybertron to rebel, while Kicker learns the truth about Alpha Q.
21	"Rampage! Laserwave (Shockblast: Rampage)"; Transliteration: "Dai Abare! Rēzāuēbu" (Japanese: 大暴れ! レーザーウェーブ)	May 28, 2004	July 3, 2004
Shockwave disables Cybertron's energon grid, while Kicker tries to convince the Autobots to listen to Alpha Q.
22	"Out of Control! The Starving Unicron (Survival Instincts)"; Transliteration: "Bōsō! Ueta Yunikuron" (Japanese: 暴走! 飢えたユニクロン)	June 4, 2004	August 27, 2004 (Canada); September 4, 2004 (USA)
Starved for energon, both Unicron's head and body begin lashing out at their respective captors.
23	"Respective Battles (Each One Fights...)"; Transliteration: "Sorezore no Tatakai" (Japanese: それぞれの戦い)	June 11, 2004	September 3, 2004 (Canada); September 4, 2004 (USA)
Shockblast leads a Decepticon invasion of Cybertron, intent on destroying the planet's energon towers.
24	"Ah! Now It Is Possible (Unicron Unleashed)"; Transliteration: "Yare! Ima Dekiru Koto" (Japanese: やれ！いまできること)	June 18, 2004	September 4, 2004
Unicron's body reactivates at last, and Megatron prepares to have him devour Cybertron.
25	"Gale! Wing Saber (Open Fire!)"; Transliteration: "Hayate! Uinguseibā" (Japanese: 疾風！ウイングセイバー)	June 25, 2004	September 4, 2004
As the Autobots push their way into Unicron's body, Shockblast betrays Megatron, and Dr. Jones sends all of Earth's energon to Alpha Q.
26	"Ripped Up Space (Ripped Up Space)"; Transliteration: "Kirisaka reta Uchū" (Japanese: 切り裂かれた宇宙)	July 1, 2004	September 4, 2004
There's a hole in the universe, dear Optimus, dear Optimus, a hole.
27	"Team Convoy's Whereabouts (Team Optimus Prime)"; Transliteration: "Chīmu Konboi no Yukue" (Japanese: チームコンボイの行方)	July 8, 2004	September 4, 2004
As the Autobots head into the black hole, Dr. Jones and his family sit around in Ocean City telling each other things they already know.
28	"The Planets that Must Be Protected (Protection)"; Transliteration: "Mamorubeki Shinshin" (Japanese: 守るべき星々)	July 15, 2004	October 8, 2004 (Canada); November 1, 2004 (USA)
On the first of Alpha Q's new planets, Wing Saber takes on Shockblast, and a Megatron-controlled Scorponok leads an attack to capture energon.
29	"Imprisoned Inferno (Imprisoned Inferno)"; Transliteration: "Toraware no Inferuno" (Japanese: 囚われのインフェルノ)	July 22, 2004	October 15, 2004 (Canada); November 2, 2004 (USA)
Ambushed and alone, Inferno is taken to his limits and beyond by Megatron.
30	"Hellfire! Jungle Planet (Jungle Planet)"; Transliteration: "Gōka! Janguru Puranetto" (Japanese: 業火! ジャングルプラネット)	July 29, 2004	October 22, 2004 (Canada); November 3, 2004 (USA)
The Decepticons attack Jungle Planet, while Inferno struggles against Megatron's reprogramming, and Autobot reinforcements arrive.
31	"Crucial Moment! Sprung Steps Forward (Bulkhead)"; Transliteration: "Iza! Supurangu Kenzan" (Japanese: いざ! スプラング見参)	August 6, 2004	October 29, 2004 (Canada); November 4, 2004 (USA)
The energon-deprived Iron Planet is destroyed, and the Autobots must fend off the Decepticons to make sure Jungle Planet doesn't share the same fate.
32	"Farewell Inferno (Farewell Inferno)"; Transliteration: "Saraba Inferuno" (Japanese: さらば インフェルノ)	August 13, 2004	November 5, 2004
As the Autobots lower energon towers to defend three of the planets, Inferno must finally decide whether he is an Autobot or a Decepticon.
33	"Special Training! Roadbuster (Crash Course)"; Transliteration: "Tokkunda~a! Rōdobasutā" (Japanese: 特訓だぁ! ロードバスター)	August 27, 2004	November 8, 2004
The Autobots hold a race to unwind for a bit, while Megatron beats up Shockblast.
34	"Ancient Sage—Omega Supreme (Omega Supreme)"; Transliteration: "Inishie no Kenja・Omeha Supurīmu" (Japanese: 古の賢者・オメガスプリーム)	September 3, 2004	November 9, 2004
Megatron begins to activate Unicron, and Omega Supreme joins the Autobots to try and stop him.
35	"Fierce! Alpha Q's Battle (A Heroic Battle)"; Transliteration: "Sōzetsu! Arufa Q no Tatakai" (Japanese: 壮絶! アルファQの戦い)	September 10, 2004	November 10, 2004
Unicron gets his head back.
36	"Laserwave's End (The Power of Unicron)"; Transliteration: "Rēzāuēbu no Saigo" (Japanese: レーザーウェーブの最期)	September 17, 2004	November 11, 2004
The Autobots find a weak spot in Unicron's armor. Meanwhile, some very interesting transformations are taking place on the Decepticon team...
37	"Deathfight! Omega Convoy (Optimus Supreme)"; Transliteration: "Shitō Omega Konboi" (Japanese: 死闘! オメガコンボイ)	September 24, 2004	November 16, 2004 (UK); November 25, 2004 (USA)
The Ice planet was destroyed by Unicron. All autobots can't save it and almost all of them got wounded from Unicron's attack.
38	"Unicron Disappears (Unicron Perishes)"; Transliteration: "Yunikuron Shōmetsu" (Japanese: ユニクロン消滅)	October 1, 2004	November 17, 2004 (UK); November 25, 2004 (USA)
Unicron dies but Megatron survives with Unicron's mind living inside him.
39	"Galvatron's Resurrected Ambitions (Ambition)"; Transliteration: "Garubatoron no Yomigaeru Yabō" (Japanese: ガルバトロンの蘇る野望)	October 8, 2004	December 31, 2004 (Canada); January 19, 2005 (USA)
The Decepticons, Megatron, Starscream, and Scorponok attack Cybertron. Optimus Prime and the other Autobots, aboard the Miranda II, travelled to Cybertron to save the planet.
40	"Superion's Hope (Wishes)"; Transliteration: "Superion no Kibō" (Japanese: スペリオンの希望)	October 15, 2004	January 7, 2005 (Canada); January 20, 2005 (USA)
Using Unicron, Megatron has discovered a powerful source of energy: Super Energon. By immersing himself in the liquid, he is transformed into Galvatron, with a new purple armor which makes him impervious to all forms of firepower. However, he awakens the guardians of the energon, who chose to join him- Constructicon and Bruticus Maximus. However, the third guardian- Superion Maximus, escapes, so he sends his new minions after him. Meanwhile, on the planet surface, the Decepticons, who had broken free of jail and discovered Megatron's (they aren't aware of Megatron's transformation) survival, attack and overrun the main Autobot base, taking control of Cybertron in the process. However, Starscream is contacted and told to report to his leader. He goes down to the temple of Super Energon, and Galvatron tells him to prove his loyalty: he must immerse himself in the legendary energy, whether he can survive it or not. He does, and he is also transformed, restoring his physical form and giving him Galvatron's powers as well. Above the planet, Optimus prepares to land, unaware of the Decepticons' presence, who search for the plans for the grid, while Dr. Jones and his family hide in a nearby tunnel. They watch as the Decepticons take over, and find that the Autobots have landed, en route to the now-Decepticon base. The Autobots find trouble, however, running into the two Decepticon combiners, backed up by Galvatron and Starscream. Unfortunately, Energon Gas is released, controlled by Six Shot, repelling the Autobots. Kicker tries to find his family in the mess, and Optimus follows, fortunately both are saved by Superion Maximus, requesting to join the Autobots.
41	"Sink! Miranda II (Galvatron)"; Transliteration: "Gekichin! Miranda II Yo-gō" (Japanese: 撃沈! ミランダII世号)	October 22, 2004	January 14, 2005 (Canada); January 21, 2005 (USA)
Galvatron has Sixshot start moving Cybertron towards the planet where Alpha Q's "soul" is. The Miranda II gets hit and crashes into Cybertron.
42	"Go for It! Omnicon (Break Through)"; Transliteration: "Soreyuke! Omunikoron" (Japanese: それゆけ! オムニコン)	October 29, 2004	January 21, 2005 (Canada); May 18, 2005 (USA)
Optimus Prime and the other Autobots try to break through the energon grid and then later have to go under ground.
43	"Must See! The Strongest Match of Dreams (Distribution)"; Transliteration: "Hikken! Yume no Saikyō Macchi: Hōei Jikan no Kotonaru Bangai-hen" (Japanese: 必見! 夢の最強マッチ: 放映時間の異なる番外編)	November 3, 2004	January 28, 2005 (Canada); May 19, 2005 (USA)
The Autobots battle, but this time in cyberspace, a virtual training program. While Alpha Q watches from the sidelines, Six Shot hacks into the program and enables the Decepticons to play in the game. The first round begins with Mirage and Tidal Wave versus Hot Shot and Rodimus, Optimus and Wing Saber versus Cliffjumper and Landmine, Ironhide and Jetfire versus Scorponok and Alpha Q, though Alpha Q isn't programmed to fight, and Sixshot and Shockblast against Roadblock and Inferno. However, the comedy relief duo- Snow Cat and Demolishor- have entered the competition, and fight against Prowl and Downshift. The Autobot group loses against the two comedic Decepticons after a failed powerlink, while Bruticus and Constructicon Maximus take down their fellow combiner, Superion Maximus. After the second round, the third round begins with the victors from the first round, Hot Shot and Rodimus defeat Optimus and Wing Saber, while Six Shot uses his hacking skills to cheat and win the battle against Jetfire and Ironhide. Meanwhile, Galvatron and Starscream enter the game looking for their minions, and make quick work of Snow Cat and Demolishor, then leave. But two other Decepticons, Bruticus and Constructicon Maximus, are also defeated by Optimus and Omega Supreme, who later take on Hot Shot and Rodimus, who just defeated Six Shot and Shockblast. Optimus and Omega Supreme lose for stepping out of the ring. Rodimus and Hot Shot win, and the victors finally win the game, but have to defeat the "special guest warrior", none other than Unicron, albeit a very "puny" one. Outside of the virtual game, Kicker thinks the Autobots aren't really all that different from himself, while Alpha Q persists, "Why can't we all just get along?"
44	"Bombing Train! Omega Supreme (The Omega Train)"; Transliteration: "Bakusō Torein! Omega Supurīmu" (Japanese: 爆走トレイン! オメガスプリーム)	November 5, 2004	February 4, 2005 (Canada); May 20, 2005 (USA)
The Autobots split up and with the help of other autobot rebels they attempt to find and free Kickers family and Cybertron. Galvatron gets Cybertron through the space bridge. Alpha Q seems to think that Galvatron has "lost his marbles" and Ironhide has an "inflated ego".
45	"Dismembered, Destron Corps (Deception Army)"; Transliteration: "Barabara, Desutoron Gundan" (Japanese: バラバラ、デストロン軍団)	November 12, 2004	February 11, 2005 (Canada); May 23, 2005 (USA)
Kicker searches for his family below Cybertron, while Galvatron and a damaged Optimus square off on the planet's surface. Kicker is reunited with his mother and sister. Demolishor and Snowcat tried to jump into the Super Energon pool, but something came out of it...
46	"It's Amazing! Team Roadbuster (Ironhide Team)"; Transliteration: "Sugoi zo! Chīmu Rōdobasutā" (Japanese: 凄いぞ! チームロードバスター)	November 19, 2004	February 18, 2005 (Canada); May 24, 2005 (USA)
Kicker's dad sabotages the energon gas grid from within enabling Optimus to get into the Command Center and Rodimus and Prowl waiting around Cybertron to get to the planet. The terrorcons got into the super energon and grow in size. Ironhide's team takes a beating by Scorponok and Ironhide's three rhyming buddies are taken out. Ironhide gets the energon to Primus, who wakes up and energizes Optimus so he can merge with Omega Supreme, becoming Optimus Supreme and defeating Galvatron and the Decepticons.
47	"Omega Convoy Again (Formidable)"; Transliteration: "Omega Konboi Futatabi" (Japanese: オメガコンボイ再び)	November 26, 2004	February 25, 2005 (Canada); May 25, 2005 (USA)
Primus is still snoozing, Sixshot overloads the grid and causes a huge explosion that takes down most of the autobots, Cybertron heads for Plains planet and destroys all the planets in its path, Optimus sees/feels Unicron and goes to Cyberton to fight (into the gas). Primus saves Optimus by absorbing the gas and super sizing Optimus Supreme (again) with it.
48	"Scary! Giant Galvatron (Galvatron Terror)"; Transliteration: "Osoroshi ya! Kyodai Garubatoron" (Japanese: 恐ろしや! 巨大ガルバトロン)	December 3, 2004	March 4, 2005 (Canada); May 26, 2005 (USA)
Sixshot convinces Mirage, Snow Cat, and Demolisher that Starscream will stay Galvatron's favorite if they do not do something about it, but when they head out Sixshot traps them and heads for the Superenergon. Sally goes into the control room after Sixshot leaves and starts helping the Autobots. Sixshot attacks Galvatron but Scorponok saves him. Galvatron gets to the superenergon and gets to be really big, guess he was jealous. He squashes Sixshot like a bug under his foot.
49	"Unprecedented! Super Destruction Emperor (Destructive Power)"; Transliteration: "Kūzenzetsugo! Chō Hakai Taitei" (Japanese: 空前絶後! 超破壊大帝)	December 10, 2004	March 11, 2005 (Canada); May 27, 2005 (USA)
Galvatron is growing and tethered to Cybertron by strands of Superenergon. Kicker and some of the Omnicons cut the strands. Ironhide and Scorponok battle, and Galvatron heads into space, but not towards Alpha Q's planet.
50	"Combination Spark's Power (Spark)"; Transliteration: "Konbinēshon Supāku no Chikara" (Japanese: コンビネーションスパークの力)	December 17, 2004	March 19, 2005 (Canada); May 31, 2005 (USA)
Big Galvatron vs Big Optimus Prime. Many little battles with all the others, too. Kicker gets sappy with Misha before going to destroy Unicron's "puny" remains, but something's not quite right...
51	"Energon, it's the Sun (The Sun)"; Transliteration: "Enerugon, Sore wa Taiyō" (Japanese: エネルゴン、それは太陽)	December 24, 2004	March 19, 2005 (Canada); June 1, 2005 (USA)
Final Energon Episode. Unicron is the "force that drives the universe" and Primus uses the super energon, the autobots band together and give their combination sparks to Optimus, Galvatron wakes/becomes Unicron again. Optimus Prime becomes "Ultimate Optimus Supreme" so we have another Big Galvatron/Unicron vs Big Optimus Prime battle. Galvatron sacrifices himself by becoming one with the super energon and turns into the sun for Alpha Q's planets. Optimus said to Rodimus, "We're looking at a brand new universe, Rodimus. This is just the beginning. It's just the beginning." Galvatron dies along with Starscream and Mirage. Note: This episode is the last to feature Scott McNeil as Jetfire, Brent Miller as Hot Shot and Ward Perry as Landmine prior to them being Replaced by Brian Drummond, Kirby Morrow and Paul Dobson in the sequel series, Transformers: Cybertron
