= Lists of The Office episodes =

Lists of The Office episodes may refer to:

- List of The Office (British TV series) episodes
- List of The Office (American TV series) episodes
