= List of Arrowverse episodes =

The following are lists of Arrowverse episodes:

- List of Arrow episodes
- List of Batwoman episodes
- List of Black Lightning episodes
- List of The Flash episodes
- List of Freedom Fighters: The Ray episodes
- List of Legends of Tomorrow episodes
- List of Supergirl episodes
- List of Vixen episodes

== See also ==
- List of Constantine episodes
- List of Superman & Lois episodes
