= List of Teenage Mutant Ninja Turtles episodes =

The Teenage Mutant Ninja Turtles are a group of anthropomorphic mutated turtles that originated in comic books. Lists of Teenage Mutant Ninja Turtles episodes include:

- List of Teenage Mutant Ninja Turtles (1987 TV series) episodes
- List of Ninja Turtles: The Next Mutation episodes
- List of Teenage Mutant Ninja Turtles (2003 TV series) episodes
- List of Teenage Mutant Ninja Turtles (2012 TV series) episodes
- List of Rise of the Teenage Mutant Ninja Turtles episodes

== See also ==
- Teenage Mutant Ninja Turtles (disambiguation)
