= List of Avatar: The Last Airbender episodes =

Episode list for an animated series

Avatar: The Last Airbender is an American animated television series created by Michael Dante DiMartino and Bryan Konietzko for Nickelodeon. It premiered on February 21, 2005, with two episodes, and ended its three-season run on July 19, 2008, with the finale that also serves as a two-hour television film. During the course of the series, 61 episodes of Avatar: The Last Airbender aired over three seasons. The Avatar: The Last Airbender franchise refers to each season as a "Book", in which each episode is referred to as a "chapter". Each "Book" takes its name from one of the elements that Aang, the protagonist, must master: Water, Earth, and Fire. In addition to the three seasons, there were two recap episodes and three "shorts". The first recap summarized the first seventeen episodes while the second summarized season two. The first self-parody was released via an online Flash game. The second and third were released with the Complete Second Season Box Set DVD. The entire series has been released on DVD in Region One, Region Two, and Region Four.

In the Avatar: The Last Airbender universe there are people who are able to manipulate or "bend" the four elements: Air, Water, Earth, and Fire. There are also sub-elements, such as metal, ice, and lightning. Along with the four elements, there are four nations that correspond with each element. Not everyone can bend an element, and those that can only bend one. However, the Avatar is a being able to manipulate all four elements, as well as communicate with the spirits. The Avatar is also born into one nation, and, after dying, is reincarnated into another nation following the pattern of Fire, Air, Water, and Earth.

The series takes place 100 years after the Fire Nation declared war against all other nations and has killed off all airbenders in search of the Avatar, who has been reincarnated as a young airbender named Aang. The Avatar, trapped in ice for 100 years, knows nothing of the war. The series starts with Aang being accidentally freed by Katara, a waterbender, and her brother Sokka. The series then primarily follows the adventures of Aang and his companions Katara, Sokka, Appa, Momo, and later Toph, as he tries to master all four elements and defeat the Fire Nation. There is also a strong focus on Zuko, the banished and disinherited crown prince of the Fire Nation, who is accompanied by his uncle Iroh. Zuko was scarred in a duel with his own father, the current Fire Lord, and is obsessed with capturing Aang for the Fire Nation in order to regain his honor and his father's favor.

== Series overview ==
Book	Name	Episodes	Originally released	
Book	Name	Episodes	First released	Last released
1	Water	20	February 21, 2005	December 2, 2005
2	Earth	20	March 17, 2006	December 1, 2006
3	Fire	21	September 21, 2007	July 19, 2008

== Episodes ==
=== Season 1: Water (2005) ===
No. overall	No. in season	Title	Directed by	Written by	Storyboarded by	Original release date	Prod. code (Note: Production code format is taken from episode commentary for "Sozin's Comet: The Phoenix King")	Viewers (millions)
1	1	"The Boy in the Iceberg"	Dave Filoni	Michael Dante DiMartino & Bryan Konietzko; Additional writing by: Aaron Ehasz, Peter Goldfinger & Josh Stolberg	Dave Filoni, Justin Ridge & Giancarlo Volpe	February 21, 2005	101	N/A
2	2	"The Avatar Returns"	Dave Filoni	Michael Dante DiMartino & Bryan Konietzko; Additional writing by: Aaron Ehasz, Peter Goldfinger & Josh Stolberg	Dave Filoni, Chris Graham, Miyuki Hoshikawa, Justin Ridge & Giancarlo Volpe	February 21, 2005	102	N/A
3	3	"The Southern Air Temple"	Lauren MacMullan	Michael Dante DiMartino	Li Hong, Lauren MacMullan & Ethan Spaulding	February 25, 2005	103	3.2
4	4	"The Warriors of Kyoshi"	Giancarlo Volpe	Nick Malis	Chris Graham, Kenji Ono & Giancarlo Volpe	March 4, 2005	104	3.7
5	5	"The King of Omashu"	Anthony Lioi	John O'Bryan	Ian Graham, Anthony Lioi & Bobby Rubio	March 18, 2005	105	3.6
6	6	"Imprisoned"	Dave Filoni	Matthew Hubbard	Dave Filoni, Miyuki Hoshikawa & Justin Ridge	March 25, 2005	106	N/A
7	7	"The Spirit World (Winter Solstice, Part 1)"	Lauren MacMullan	Aaron Ehasz	Jerry Langford, Lauren MacMullan & Ethan Spaulding	April 8, 2005	107	N/A
8	8	"Avatar Roku (Winter Solstice, Part 2)"	Giancarlo Volpe	Michael Dante DiMartino	Chris Graham, Kenji Ono & Giancarlo Volpe	April 15, 2005	108	N/A
9	9	"The Waterbending Scroll"	Anthony Lioi	John O'Bryan	Ian Graham, Bryan Konietzko, Anthony Lioi & Bobby Rubio	April 29, 2005	109	N/A
10	10	"Jet"	Dave Filoni	James Eagan	Dave Filoni, Miyuki Hoshikawa & Justin Ridge	May 6, 2005	110	3.4
11	11	"The Great Divide"	Giancarlo Volpe	John O'Bryan	Michael Dante DiMartino, Chris Graham, Kenji Ono & Giancarlo Volpe	May 20, 2005	111	N/A
12	12	"The Storm"	Lauren MacMullan	Aaron Ehasz	Jerry Langford, Lauren MacMullan & Ethan Spaulding	June 3, 2005	112	N/A
13	13	"The Blue Spirit"	Dave Filoni	Michael Dante DiMartino & Bryan Konietzko	Michael Dante DiMartino, Ian Graham, Bryan Konietzko, Anthony Lioi & Bobby Rubio	June 17, 2005	113	N/A
14	14	"The Fortuneteller"	Dave Filoni	Aaron Ehasz & John O'Bryan	Dave Filoni, Ian Graham, Miyuki Hoshikawa & Justin Ridge	September 23, 2005	114	N/A
15	15	"Bato of the Water Tribe"	Giancarlo Volpe	Ian Wilcox	Chris Graham, Kenji Ono, Bobby Rubio & Giancarlo Volpe	October 7, 2005	115	N/A
16	16	"The Deserter"	Lauren MacMullan	Tim Hedrick	Dean Kelly, Jerry Langford, Lauren MacMullan & Ethan Spaulding	October 21, 2005	116	3.0
17	17	"The Northern Air Temple"	Dave Filoni	Elizabeth Welch	Dave Filoni, Ian Graham, Miyuki Hoshikawa & Justin Ridge	November 4, 2005	117	N/A
18	18	"The Waterbending Master"	Giancarlo Volpe	Michael Dante DiMartino	Chris Graham, Kenji Ono, Bobby Rubio & Giancarlo Volpe	November 18, 2005	118	N/A
19	19	"The Siege of the North"	Lauren MacMullan	John O'Bryan	Oreste Canestrelli, Dean Kelly, Lauren MacMullan & Ethan Spaulding	December 2, 2005	119	3.6
20	20	"The Siege of the North"	Dave Filoni	Aaron Ehasz	Dave Filoni, Ian Graham, Miyuki Hoshikawa & Justin Ridge	December 2, 2005	120	3.6

=== Season 2: Earth (2006) ===
No. overall	No. in season	Title	Directed by	Written by	Storyboarded by	Original release date	Prod. code	U.S. viewers (millions)
21	1	"The Avatar State"	Giancarlo Volpe	Aaron Ehasz, Elizabeth Welch, Tim Hedrick & John O'Bryan	Oreste Canestrelli, Ian Graham, Bobby Rubio & Giancarlo Volpe	March 17, 2006	201	3.7
22	2	"The Cave of Two Lovers"	Lauren MacMullan	Joshua Hamilton	Chris Graham, Dean Kelly, Lauren MacMullan, Kenji Ono & Tomihiro Yamaguchi	March 24, 2006	202	N/A
23	3	"Return to Omashu"	Ethan Spaulding	Elizabeth Welch	Miyuki Hoshikawa, Ethan Spaulding, Justin Ridge & Tomihiro Yamaguchi	April 7, 2006	203	N/A
24	4	"The Swamp"	Giancarlo Volpe	Tim Hedrick	Oreste Canestrelli, Ian Graham, Bobby Rubio & Giancarlo Volpe	April 14, 2006	204	2.7
25	5	"Avatar Day"	Lauren MacMullan	John O'Bryan	Chris Graham, Seung-Hyun Oh, Dean Kelly, Lauren MacMullan & Kenji Ono	April 28, 2006	205	N/A
26	6	"The Blind Bandit"	Ethan Spaulding	Michael Dante DiMartino	Miyuki Hoshikawa, Bryan Konietzko, Justin Ridge, Ethan Spaulding & Tomihiro Yamaguchi	May 5, 2006	206	N/A
27	7	"Zuko Alone"	Lauren MacMullan	Elizabeth Welch	Chris Graham, Dean Kelly, Lauren MacMullan & Kenji Ono	May 12, 2006	207	N/A
28	8	"The Chase"	Giancarlo Volpe	Joshua Hamilton	Oreste Canestrelli, Michael Dante DiMartino, Ian Graham, Bobby Rubio & Giancarlo Volpe	May 26, 2006	208	2.9
29	9	"Bitter Work"	Ethan Spaulding	Aaron Ehasz	Michael Chang, Miyuki Hoshikawa, Justin Ridge, Ethan Spaulding & Tomihiro Yamaguchi	June 2, 2006	209	N/A
30	10	"The Library"	Giancarlo Volpe	John O'Bryan	Oreste Canestrelli, Ian Graham, Bobby Rubio & Giancarlo Volpe	July 14, 2006	210	N/A
31	11	"The Desert"	Lauren MacMullan	Tim Hedrick	Chris Graham, Dean Kelly, Lauren MacMullan & Kenji Ono	July 14, 2006	211	N/A
32	12	"The Serpent's Pass"	Ethan Spaulding	Michael Dante DiMartino & Joshua Hamilton	Miyuki Hoshikawa, Justin Ridge, Ethan Spaulding & Tomihiro Yamaguchi	September 15, 2006	212	4.1
33	13	"The Drill"	Giancarlo Volpe	Michael Dante DiMartino & Bryan Konietzko	Oreste Canestrelli, Chris Graham, Ian Graham, Dean Kelly, Kenji Ono, Bobby Rubio & Giancarlo Volpe	September 15, 2006	213	4.1
34	14	"City of Walls and Secrets"	Lauren MacMullan	Tim Hedrick	Chris Graham, Dean Kelly, Lauren MacMullan & Kenji Ono	September 22, 2006	214	N/A
35	15	"The Tales of Ba Sing Se"	Ethan Spaulding	See note for screenwriters (Note: "The Tales of Ba Sing Se" is a collection of short stories that each have their own writer(s); they are as follows: The Tale of Toph and Katara: Joann Estoesta & Lisa Wahlander; The Tale of Iroh: Andrew Huebner; The Tale of Aang: Gary Scheppke; The Tale of Sokka: Lauren MacMullan; The Tale of Zuko: Katie Mattila; The Tale of Momo: Justin Ridge & Giancarlo Volpe)	Michael Chang, Joaquim Dos Santos, Ian Graham, Miyuki Hoshikawa & Ethan Spaulding	September 29, 2006	215	N/A
36	16	"Appa's Lost Days"	Giancarlo Volpe	Elizabeth Welch	Oreste Canestrelli, Ian Graham, Bobby Rubio & Giancarlo Volpe	October 13, 2006	216	N/A
37	17	"Lake Laogai"	Lauren MacMullan	Tim Hedrick	Joaquim Dos Santos, Chris Graham, Dean Kelly, Lauren MacMullan & Kenji Ono	November 3, 2006	217	2.8
38	18	"The Earth King"	Ethan Spaulding	John O'Bryan	Michael Chang, Joaquim Dos Santos, Miyuki Hoshikawa & Ethan Spaulding	November 17, 2006	218	N/A
39	19	"The Guru"	Giancarlo Volpe	Michael Dante DiMartino & Bryan Konietzko	Oreste Canestrelli, Ian Graham, Bobby Rubio & Giancarlo Volpe	December 1, 2006	219	4.4
40	20	"The Crossroads of Destiny"	Michael Dante DiMartino	Aaron Ehasz	Michael Dante DiMartino, Chris Graham, Dean Kelly, Kenji Ono & Michael Chang	December 1, 2006	220	4.4

=== Season 3: Fire (2007–2008) ===
No. overall	No. in season	Title	Directed by	Written by	Storyboarded by	Original release date	Prod. code	U.S. viewers (millions)
41	1	"The Awakening"	Giancarlo Volpe	Aaron Ehasz	Michael Chang, Dean Kelly, Juan Meza-Leon, Bobby Rubio & Giancarlo Volpe	September 21, 2007	301	N/A
42	2	"The Headband"	Joaquim Dos Santos	John O'Bryan	Joaquim Dos Santos, Ian Graham, Seung-Hyun Oh, Kenji Ono & Tomihiro Yamahuchi	September 28, 2007	302	N/A
43	3	"The Painted Lady"	Ethan Spaulding	Joshua Hamilton	Oreste Canestrelli, Miyuki Hoshikawa, Dean Kelly & Ethan Spaulding	October 5, 2007	303	N/A
44	4	"Sokka's Master"	Giancarlo Volpe	Tim Hedrick	Michael Chang, Juan Meza-Leon, Bobby Rubio & Giancarlo Volpe	October 12, 2007	304	N/A
45	5	"The Beach"	Joaquim Dos Santos	Katie Mattila	Michael Dante DiMartino, Joaquim Dos Santos, Ian Graham, Bryan Konietzko, Seung-Hyun Oh & Kenji Ono	October 19, 2007	305	N/A
46	6	"The Avatar and the Fire Lord"	Ethan Spaulding	Elizabeth Welch	Oreste Canestrelli, Miyuki Hoshikawa, Dean Kelly & Ethan Spaulding	October 26, 2007 (Note: This episode was first released in the United Kingdom on October 24, 2007.)	306	N/A
47	7	"The Runaway"	Giancarlo Volpe	Joshua Hamilton	Michael Chang, Juan Meza-Leon, Bobby Rubio & Giancarlo Volpe	November 2, 2007 (Note: This episode was first released in the United Kingdom on October 25, 2007.)	307	N/A
48	8	"The Puppetmaster"	Joaquim Dos Santos	Tim Hedrick	Joaquim Dos Santos, Ian Graham, Kim Sang-Jin, Lauren Montgomery & Kenji Ono	November 9, 2007 (Note: This episode was first released in the United Kingdom on October 25, 2007.)	308	N/A
49	9	"Nightmares and Daydreams"	Ethan Spaulding	John O'Bryan	Oreste Canestrelli, Miyuki Hoshikawa, Dean Kelly, Kim Sang-Jin & Ethan Spaulding	November 16, 2007 (Note: This episode was first released in the United Kingdom on October 26, 2007.)	309	N/A
50	10	"The Day of Black Sun, Part 1: The Invasion"	Giancarlo Volpe	Michael Dante DiMartino	Michael Chang, Michael Dante DiMartino, Juan Meza-Leon, Yu Jae Myoung, Bobby Rubio & Giancarlo Volpe	November 30, 2007	310	3.77
51	11	"The Day of Black Sun, Part 2: The Eclipse"	Joaquim Dos Santos	Aaron Ehasz	Joaquim Dos Santos, Ian Graham, Lauren Montgomery, Kenji Ono & Kim Sang-Jin	November 30, 2007	311	3.77
52	12	"The Western Air Temple"	Ethan Spaulding	Elizabeth Welch & Tim Hedrick	Oreste Canestrelli, Miyuki Hoshikawa, Dean Kelly, Lauren Montgomery & Ethan Spaulding	July 14, 2008 (Note: This episode was first released on Book 3: Volume 3 DVD on May 6, 2008.)	312	N/A
53	13	"The Firebending Masters"	Giancarlo Volpe	John O'Bryan	Michael Chang, Johane Matte, Juan Meza-Leon, Kim Sang-Jin & Giancarlo Volpe	July 15, 2008	313	N/A
54	14	"The Boiling Rock"	Joaquim Dos Santos	May Chan	Joaquim Dos Santos, Ian Graham, Lauren Montgomery, Kenji Ono & Yu Jae Myoung	July 16, 2008	314	3.97
55	15	"The Boiling Rock"	Ethan Spaulding	Joshua Hamilton	Oreste Canestrelli, Michael Dante DiMartino, Miyuki Hoshikawa, Dean Kelly, Ethan Spaulding, Kim Sang-Jin & Bryan Konietzko	July 16, 2008	315	3.97
56	16	"The Southern Raiders"	Joaquim Dos Santos	Elizabeth Welch	Dae Kang Sung, Joaquim Dos Santos, Ian Graham, Lauren Montgomery, Kenji Ono & Yu Jae Myoung	July 17, 2008	316	4.23
57	17	"The Ember Island Players"	Giancarlo Volpe	Tim Hedrick, Joshua Hamilton & John O'Bryan	Michael Chang, Johane Matte, Juan Meza-Leon, Giancarlo Volpe, Young Jung Hye & Yu Jae Myoung	July 18, 2008	317	4.53
58	18	"Sozin's Comet, Part 1: The Phoenix King"	Ethan Spaulding	Michael Dante DiMartino	Oreste Canestrelli, Michael Dante DiMartino, Elsa Garagarza, Miyuki Hoshikawa, Dean Kelly, Lauren Montgomery, Seung-Hyun Oh, Ethan Spaulding & Yu Jae Myoung	July 19, 2008	318	5.59
59	19	"Sozin's Comet, Part 2: The Old Masters"	Giancarlo Volpe	Aaron Ehasz	Michael Chang, Johane Matte, Juan Meza-Leon, Yu Jae Myoung, Seung-Hyun Oh & Giancarlo Volpe	July 19, 2008	319	5.59
60	20	"Sozin's Comet, Part 3: Into the Inferno"	Joaquim Dos Santos	Michael Dante DiMartino & Bryan Konietzko	Joaquim Dos Santos, Dean Kelly, Bryan Konietzko, Lauren Montgomery, Seung-Hyun Oh & Ethan Spaulding	July 19, 2008	320	5.59
61	21	"Sozin's Comet, Part 4: Avatar Aang"	Joaquim Dos Santos	Michael Dante DiMartino & Bryan Konietzko	Michael Dante DiMartino, Joaquim Dos Santos, Dean Kelly, Bryan Konietzko, Lauren Montgomery, Seung-Hyun Oh & Ethan Spaulding	July 19, 2008	321	5.59

== Home media release ==
=== Region 1 ===
The first Avatar: The Last Airbender DVD set became available on January 31, 2006. The first season had five DVD sets, each containing four episodes. For season two and three, four DVD sets were released, with five episodes on each. The only exception to the release pattern was the last DVD set of season three, which contained a sixth episode. At the end of each season, a box set was released, containing all of the episodes from the season. Each box set contains an additional disc of bonus features not available as an individual disc release like every episode of the series. Avatar: The Last Airbender: The Complete Series DVD box set featuring all three books was released in North America on October 6, 2015. A Blu-ray version of The Complete Series box set was released in North America on June 5, 2018, in honor of the tenth anniversary of the series finale.

Volume	Book One: Water			Book Two: Earth			Book Three: Fire		
Volume	Released	Discs	Episodes	Released	Discs	Episodes	Released	Discs	Episodes
1	January 31, 2006	1	4	January 23, 2007	1	5	October 30, 2007	1	5
2	March 28, 2006	1	4	April 10, 2007	1	5	January 22, 2008	1	5
3	May 30, 2006	1	4	May 22, 2007	1	5	May 06, 2008	1	5
4	July 18, 2006	1	4	August 14, 2007	1	5	July 29, 2008	1	6
5	September 19, 2006	1	4	20			21		
Box set	September 19, 2006	6	20	September 11, 2007	5	20	September 16, 2008	5	21
Collector's Edition	June 22, 2010	7	20	There is no collector's edition for this season.			There is no collector's edition for this season.		
Complete Series DVD box set	October 6, 2015	16 (Paramount Pictures)	61 (Paramount Pictures)						
Complete Series Blu-ray box set	May 1, 2018 (Best Buy); June 5, 2018 (Elsewhere); February 18, 2020 (Steelbook)	9	54 (Paramount Pictures)						

=== Region 2 ===
In the United States, all Season One DVDs were encoded using NTSC. Since this is not compatible in most countries outside North America, Nickelodeon released separate DVDs in regions where the video would be encoded using PAL instead. These releases began on February 19, 2007; each DVD was released months after the original release. As with the original DVDs, each set contained five episodes on one disc, with the exception of The Complete Book One Collection Box Set, which contained all of the twenty episodes in the season on five discs. In the Netherlands, all episodes came out in a box.

Avatar: The Last Airbender: The Complete Series DVD box set featuring all three books was released in the United Kingdom on August 6, 2012. A Blu-ray version of The Complete Series box set was released in the United Kingdom on June 11, 2018.

Volume	Book One: Water			Book Two: Earth			Book Three: Fire		
Volume	Released	Discs	Episodes	Released	Discs	Episodes	Released	Discs	Episodes
1	February 19, 2007	1	4	Not released	1	5	Not released	1	5
2	June 4, 2007	1	4	Not released	1	5	Not released	1	5
3	September 3, 2007	1	4	Not released	1	5	Not released	1	5
4	February 18, 2008	1	4	Not released	1	5	Not released	1	6
5	May 26, 2008	1	4	There is no volume five DVD for this season.			There is no volume five DVD for this season.		
Box set	January 26, 2009	5	20	July 20, 2009	4	20	February 1, 2010	4	21
Complete Series DVD box set	August 6, 2012	13	61						
Complete Series Blu-ray box set	June 11, 2018	9	54						

=== Region 4 ===
The following release dates are the Australian release dates, and may or may not represent the release dates for all of region 4.

Volume	Book One: Water			Book Two: Earth			Book Three: Fire		
Volume	Released	Discs	Episodes	Released	Discs	Episodes	Released	Discs	Episodes
1	March 15, 2007	1	4	June 4, 2009	1	5	June 3, 2010	1	5
2	July 5, 2007	1	4	August 4, 2009	1	5	September 23, 2010	1	5
3	March 13, 2008	1	4	October 29, 2009	1	5	October 7, 2010	1	5
4	June 19, 2008	1	4	March 31, 2010	1	5	November 4, 2010	1	6
5	March 5, 2009	1	4	There is no volume five DVD for this season.			There is no volume five DVD for this season.		
Box set	June 4, 2009	5	20	September 9, 2010	4	20	December 2, 2010	4	21
Complete Series Blu-ray box set	November 14, 2018	9	54						

== See also ==
- List of The Legend of Korra episodes
