= The Ember Island Players =

- Avatar: The Last Airbender episode
- Toph Beifong, Suki, Katara, Sokka, Zuko and Aang watching the play.
- Episode no.: Season 3 Episode 17
- Directed by: Giancarlo Volpe
- Written by: Tim Hedrick; Joshua Hamilton; John O'Bryan
- Production code: 317
- Original air date: July 18, 2008

Guest appearances
- Rachel Dratch as Aang's actress; Derek Basco as Zuko's actor; Tara Strong as Azula's actress; Scott Menville as Sokka's actor; John DiMaggio as Iroh and Toph's actors

Episode chronology
← Previous "The Southern Raiders"	Next → "Sozin's Comet, Part 1: The Phoenix King"
- Avatar: The Last Airbender season 3

The Ember Island Players is the seventeenth and penultimate episode of the third season of the American animated television series Avatar: The Last Airbender, and the 57th episode overall. The episode, written by Tim Hedrick, Joshua Hamilton and John O'Bryan, and directed by Giancarlo Volpe, follows Aang and his friends attending a play about them, only to find it is propaganda. The episode serves as a recap episode of the story so far in the form of a propaganda play, while also leading into the series finale "Sozin's Comet", which would air the following day. The episode released on Nickelodeon on July 18, 2008, and was watched by 4.53 million viewers. The episode received positive reviews.

== Plot ==
As Aang and Zuko practice their firebending at Ozai's beach house on Ember Island, Sokka and Suki arrive from the market with a poster advertising a play about the group's adventures. When the group arrives at the theater that night, they realize it is not true to their story. The actress playing Katara is an emotional filibusterer while Sokka's actor constantly makes awful jokes about his hunger, much to their real counterparts' disappointment. Suki states that Sokka makes bad jokes about other things, and Sokka agrees. Aang is heavily angered when he sees his counterpart is played by a woman, while Zuko begins to realize how badly he treated his uncle Iroh, when he is shown being rude to him in the search to capture Aang. However, Toph enjoys every aspect of the show, especially her portrayal as a big, buff man.

As the show continues, the play depicts their various adventures in a cheesy, unflattering, and inaccurate light. In the scene where Zuko and Katara are trapped in the Crystal Catacombs of Ba Sing Se, the actress Katara states she has a crush on Zuko and that she thinks of Aang as a little brother (much to the discomfort of the real Zuko and Katara). This angers Aang, who walks out of the play with Sokka, not realizing that he's upset, asking him for fire gummies. Katara finds him during an intermission, and he tells her that he had hoped they would be together after he confessed his feelings to her on the day of the invasion. (Note: As depicted in "The Day of Black Sun") Katara confesses that she is confused and that she doesn't want to enter into a relationship with a war going on, but Aang kisses her regardless. Katara gets angry with this and returns to the play; Aang gets upset at himself for being too forwards. Inside, Zuko talks with Toph about how he feels he has betrayed his uncle, and that the play is just shoving all his bad decisions in his face. Toph reassures Zuko that Iroh would be proud of him, and she would know as she met him once and all he talked about was Zuko. (Note: As depicted in "The Chase") Sokka and Suki go backstage where Sokka gives his play counterpart's actor some tips on Sokka's comedy, which the actor uses during the play to Sokka's delight.

Eventually, the play catches up with the present, at which point it veers into a speculative depiction of the arrival of Sozin's comet. The play's versions of Aang and Zuko are killed by Ozai and Azula, respectively, resulting in rapturous applause from the Fire Nation audience and disturbing the real Aang and Zuko. With the play revealed as a propaganda piece, the group exits, feeling deflated and quite disappointed, though Sokka admits the special effects were decent.

== Credits ==
The episode contains the main characters as well as the Ember Island actors who play them in the play: Zach Tyler Eisen and Rachel Dratch play Avatar Aang and his actor counterpart respectively; Mae Whitman and Grey DeLisle, who played Azula in 'real life', play Katara and her counterpart respectively; Jack DeSena and Scott Menville play Sokka and his counterpart respectively; Jessie Flower and John DiMaggio play Toph Beifong and her counterpart respectively; Dante Basco and Derek Basco (his brother) play Zuko and his counterpart respectively.

Additionally, Dee Bradley Baker voices Appa, Momo, the actor playing Bumi (originally played by André Sogliuzzo), the actor playing Jet (originally played by Crawford Wilson), and the actor playing Fire Lord Ozai (originally played by Mark Hamill). DiMaggio also voices the actor playing Iroh, who was originally played by both Mako Iwamatsu and Greg Baldwin. Actress Azula is played by Tara Strong. Also appearing as a guest star is Jennie Kwan as Suki and the actress playing Princess Yue (originally played by Johanna Braddy).

The episode was directed by Giancarlo Volpe and written by Tim Hedrick, Joshua Hamilton, and John O'Bryan.

== Production ==
The animation was done by JM Animation.

The episode aired on Nickelodeon on July 18, 2008, and aired as part of the promotional event "Countdown to the Comet" where episodes of the show aired all week in the leadup to the four-part series finale on July 19, 2008. The original idea of the episode came from writer Tim Hedrick who pitched that Team Avatar would encounter a group of performers who retell their story. The writers then used the idea as a way to recap the story right before the series finale. The episode also bears similarities with the 2004 book Days of Magic, Nights of War by Clive Barker which also features characters watching an inaccurate play about their adventures.

Unlike most recap episodes, which are usually created as a result of a show's lessened budget, "The Ember Island Players" features a plethora of original designs for new characters and locations, as well as accompanying animation, all of which required significant effort from the production crew. The action sequences in the episode were inspired by Shaolin stage shows and Chinese acrobatic performances.

Writer Tim Hedrick has stated that Katara's rejection of Aang's romantic advances and the allusions to a potential relationship between Zuko and Katara served as a plot device for the writers to keep their options open. He explained that there was no established plan for Aang and Katara to end up together in the series finale, and that Aang could have remained single: "I mean, I don't think it was really settled that Aang and Katara were going to get together at the end of the season. That's where it seemed like it was going, but it was not, you know... a foregone conclusion. Aang could have just... He could have, you know, embraced his monk lifestyle and just wandered off to get into more adventures." Writer Joshua Hamilton also denies that the Zuko and Katara moments were written in for purely "fan service" reasons. This aligns with comments from M. Night Shyamalan, director of The Last Airbender film, who noted that during the production of Book Three: Fire, Michael Dante DiMartino and Bryan Konietzko had not yet decided how the series would conclude: "At that time they hadn't even decided where things were going to end, even like who Katara was going to end up with."

== Reception ==
The episode received positive reviews from critics and fans.

Hayden Childs of The A.V. Club stated the episode "raises fan service to an art form" and refers to it as "an endlessly quotable installment for fans", while writing "The play itself is an embarrassment of riches, from the callback to the surprisingly knowledgeable merchant of cabbage to actor-Zuko's princely long locks. The caricatures of the characters are generally spot-on, especially with how each embarrasses the character themselves (with the exception of Toph, natch) while making his or her friends laugh." Tony Ireland Mell of IGN gave the episode a rating of 8.9 out of 10, writing that "Watching the play was also a nice choice by the writers to give the characters a glimpse at how some people may view them, and it all seemed pretty accurate. Much like the 200th episode of Stargate SG-1 where they poked fun at the show, "The Ember Island Players" did the same type of thing, and in my opinion, that's what good television and great story telling is all about."

In 2020, Millie Mae Mealy of The Harvard Crimson ranked the episode as the 20th best of the show, writing that "When a standard show does a recap episode, they recycle old footage, maybe throw in some animated bloopers or a new voiceover. Avatar, on the other hand, chose to gloriously satirize itself and raise the new question that will lead us into the finale: Should Aang kill the Fire Lord?"

Some fans claim that the episode predicted the reception of M. Night Shyamalan's The Last Airbender.
