= Avatar: The Last Airbender season 3 =

Third season of Avatar: The Last Airbender episode list

Avatar: The Last Airbender
- Season 3 Book Three: Fire
- DVD cover for the third season
- Showrunners: Michael Dante DiMartino; Bryan Konietzko
- Starring: Zach Tyler Eisen; Mae Whitman; Jack DeSena; Dante Basco; Jessie Flower; Dee Bradley Baker; Greg Baldwin; Grey DeLisle; Mark Hamill
- No. of episodes: 21

Release
- Original network: Nickelodeon
- Original release: September 21, 2007 – July 19, 2008

Season chronology
- ← Previous; Book Two: Earth

Book Three: Fire is the third and final season of Avatar: The Last Airbender, an American animated television series created by Michael Dante DiMartino and Bryan Konietzko. The series stars Zach Tyler Eisen, Mae Whitman, Jack DeSena, Michaela Jill Murphy, Dante Basco, Dee Bradley Baker, Greg Baldwin (replacing Mako Iwamatsu as Iroh, who died in July 2006), Grey DeLisle, and Mark Hamill as the main character voices.

The final season focuses once again on Avatar Aang, now seeking to learn Firebending, and his friends Katara, Sokka, and Toph, who must defeat the tyrannical Fire Lord Ozai before the arrival of Sozin's Comet. Concurrently, it also follows Prince Zuko, who is finally welcomed back into the Fire Nation after betraying his uncle Iroh and helping his sister Azula conquer Ba Sing Se in Book Two.

The third season aired on Nickelodeon from September 21, 2007 to July 19, 2008, consisting of 21 episodes and concluding with the four-part series finale "Sozin's Comet". Like the previous seasons, it received critical acclaim, with many praising it as a satisfying conclusion to the series. Between October 30, 2007 and September 16, 2008, Paramount Home Entertainment released four DVD volumes and a complete boxset.

The season was followed by the comic trilogy series The Promise which is set one year after the series finale.

A spin-off sequel series, The Legend of Korra, aired on Nickelodeon from April 14, 2012 to July 25, 2014, then on Nick.com from August 1 to December 19, 2014. Set seventy years after the finale, the series follows Avatar Korra of the Southern Water Tribe, the successor of Avatar Aang.

== Episodes ==
No. overall	No. in season	Title	Directed by	Written by	Storyboarded by	Original release date	Prod. code (Note: Production code format is taken from episode commentary for "Sozin's Comet: The Phoenix King")	U.S. viewers (millions)
41	1	"The Awakening"	Giancarlo Volpe	Aaron Ehasz	Michael Chang, Dean Kelly, Juan Meza-Leon, Bobby Rubio & Giancarlo Volpe	September 21, 2007	301	N/A
Aang awakens to find himself weakened and all of his friends dressed in Fire Nation clothing as they travel on a stolen Fire Navy ship. After Aang was mortally wounded by Azula, the group reunited with Hakoda and the Southern Water Tribe soldiers. The Earth King set off alone to explore the world, leaving the team without the Earth Kingdom military for the invasion, though a smaller one is still being planned. Aang, however, is dismayed to discover that the world once again believes him to be dead, just like when he was frozen in the iceberg. Sokka believes that this is a positive development, since the Fire Nation will not pursue them anymore, and insists they should maintain the ruse as long as possible. Azula and Zuko are welcomed home as heroes, and Ozai congratulates his son for killing Aang and apprehending Iroh for his betrayal to the Fire Nation. Zuko believes that Azula credited him with killing the Avatar for her own ulterior purposes. Aang tries to charge into the Fire Nation alone, determined to redeem himself. Avatar Roku and Yue's spirits intervene and both counsel Aang. Aang accepts that secrecy is his greatest advantage until the invasion, tossing his trademark glider into the lava flows of Roku's island.
42	2	"The Headband"	Joaquim Dos Santos	John O'Bryan	Joaquim Dos Santos, Ian Graham, Seung-Hyun Oh, Kenji Ono & Tomihiro Yamahuchi	September 28, 2007	302	N/A
Team Avatar steal some clothes to hide in plain sight while traveling through the Fire Nation, but Aang unwittingly snags a Fire Nation school uniform and is found by a local truant officer and taken to class. He hides his tattoos with a headband and long sleeves, adopts the alias Kuzon after one of his old friends, and begins to learn about history through the Fire Nation point of view, discovering that it is full of propaganda and falsehoods meant to indoctrinate children. He decides to organize a school-wide dance party for the up-tight Fire Nation kids, which starts off awkwardly but gradually allows the kids to express themselves. When the principal arrives to shut it down, the kids help Aang escape. A form of movement similar to Capoeira is shown as a Fire Nation traditional dance. Meanwhile, Zuko becomes increasingly paranoid that Aang is still alive (and that Azula can blackmail him), and hires an assassin to kill him.
43	3	"The Painted Lady"	Ethan Spaulding	Joshua Hamilton	Oreste Canestrelli, Miyuki Hoshikawa, Dean Kelly & Ethan Spaulding	October 5, 2007	303	N/A
The gang arrives at a Fire Nation village populated by sick and starving people. They are sick because of a nearby Fire Nation munitions factory polluting their river. Katara convinces the group to stay by making Appa appear sick and assumes the role of "The Painted Lady," a local legend, in order to heal the sick and steal food from the factory. Eventually she is forced to give up the ruse to Aang, who helps her in destroying the factory to permanently help the village. In response to the destruction of the factory, Fire Nation soldiers attack the village, but are repelled collectively by Team Avatar impersonating The Painted Lady. Katara reveals herself to the villagers, who thank her for her selfless aid. Later that night, Katara is also thanked by the spirit of the real Painted Lady.
44	4	"Sokka's Master"	Giancarlo Volpe	Tim Hedrick	Michael Chang, Juan Meza-Leon, Bobby Rubio & Giancarlo Volpe	October 12, 2007	304	N/A
Sokka has long felt isolated as the only person of the group unable to bend. Maintaining his assumed Fire Nation identity, he convinces Fire Nation sword master Piandao to teach him. Piandao teaches Sokka the philosophy of swordsmanship by giving him various boring tasks like painting and rock-gardening. The sword master also helps Sokka forge his own sword, with Sokka choosing to use a meteorite that landed near the group's campsite as the steel. When Sokka gains Piandao's respect, he becomes ashamed of misrepresenting himself and confesses he is not of the Fire Nation. Piandao challenges Sokka to a duel, then reveals that Sokka's identity had been readily apparent from their first meeting and that the ways of the sword belong to all nations. He gives Sokka a white lotus Pai Sho tile as a farewell gift. Meanwhile, Iroh devises a plan to escape his Fire Nation prison and, while feigning the part of a senile wretch for his captors, secretly begins an intense training regimen to further build his strength.
45	5	"The Beach"	Joaquim Dos Santos	Katie Mattila	Michael Dante DiMartino, Joaquim Dos Santos, Ian Graham, Bryan Konietzko, Seung-Hyun Oh & Kenji Ono	October 19, 2007	305	N/A
Azula, Zuko, Mai and Ty Lee go on a forced vacation to Ember Island while Ozai meets with his advisors alone. Zuko and the girls attend a party where Azula tries to flirt but scares boys away with her poor social skills. Zuko, who has resumed a romantic relationship with Mai, observes a boy flirting with her and destroys a vase in anger, prompting Mai to tell him off. The group shares stories of how their pasts shaped them around a campfire. They end the night by trashing the house. Meanwhile, Team Avatar are attacked by Zuko's assassin, who uses an unusual form of firebending that creates powerful localized explosions from a third eye in the center of his forehead. The group narrowly escapes on Appa, with Katara mentioning her belief that the assassin knows who they are.
46	6	"The Avatar and the Fire Lord"	Ethan Spaulding	Elizabeth Welch	Oreste Canestrelli, Miyuki Hoshikawa, Dean Kelly & Ethan Spaulding	October 26, 2007 (Note: This episode was first released in the United Kingdom on October 24, 2007.)	306	N/A
With guidance from Avatar Roku's spirit and Fire Lord Sozin's final testament, Aang and Zuko respectively learn about Roku and Sozin's childhood friendship. Sozin suggested to Roku upon his return from mastering the elements that the Fire Nation should expand their empire to ensure global prosperity. As the Avatar, Roku knew the importance of balance between all nations and vehemently disagreed. Some time later, upon seeing a Fire Nation colony in Earth Kingdom territory, Roku swiftly defeats Sozin but spares him in honor of their past friendship and warns that further dissent will result in his demise. Twenty-five years later, Roku's volcanic island home erupted, prompting Sozin to race to help his old friend. At the last moment, with Roku suffocating from volcanic gases, Sozin realized that he could set his plans in motion if he let Roku die and abandoned him. Roku perished and was reincarnated as Aang. Sozin knew that the next Avatar would be an Air Nomad, leading to the destruction of the Air Temples, but found that Aang had eluded him. Confronting Iroh in his prison cell, Zuko learns that Avatar Roku was his mother's grandfather, symbolizing the battle of evil and good within Zuko to cleanse the sins of their family. Aang meanwhile discusses with his friends that Roku and Sozin's story shows that anyone is capable of great good and great evil, and that Ozai and the Fire Nation must be treated humanely.
47	7	"The Runaway"	Giancarlo Volpe	Joshua Hamilton	Michael Chang, Juan Meza-Leon, Bobby Rubio & Giancarlo Volpe	November 2, 2007 (Note: This episode was first released in the United Kingdom on October 25, 2007.)	307	N/A
Katara expresses her disapproval when Toph and the boys begin scamming Fire Nation street gamblers for quick cash. Toph thinks Katara is acting too motherly, and a rift forms within the group when Sokka finds a wanted poster of Toph naming her 'The Runaway'. After overhearing Sokka discuss Katara's motherly instincts after the death of their own mother with Toph, Katara decides to pull a scam with Toph to patch things up. Katara plans to turn Toph in and collect the reward money, with Toph metalbending her way out of jail. The plan fails when Toph is placed in a wooden cell, soon followed by Katara at the hands of Zuko's assassin. He uses them as bait in an attempt to kill Aang, but Katara brilliantly uses her own sweat to waterbend herself and Toph out of the cell. The group subdue the assassin long enough to escape the town, with Sokka nicknaming their pursuer "Combustion Man".
48	8	"The Puppetmaster"	Joaquim Dos Santos	Tim Hedrick	Joaquim Dos Santos, Ian Graham, Kim Sang-Jin, Lauren Montgomery & Kenji Ono	November 9, 2007 (Note: This episode was first released in the United Kingdom on October 25, 2007.)	308	N/A
The gang discovers that there have been strange disappearances in a nearby Fire Nation town during the full moon. They befriend an elderly innkeeper named Hama, who reveals that she is a waterbender from the Southern Water Tribe who had been taken away sixty years ago alongside her fellow waterbenders. She becomes Katara's mentor and shares with her the tragic story of her life as a longtime prisoner of the Fire Nation, as well as new waterbending techniques, such as pulling water out of thin air or plants. Katara later discovers that Hama is enacting her revenge by kidnapping Fire Nation civilians with bloodbending, a sinister waterbending technique which manipulates the water in a person's body to cause them great pain and take over their actions. Katara battles Hama while the rest of the group find the group of villagers locked in a cave. Aang and Sokka go back to stop Hama while Toph frees the villagers. Katara is eventually forced to use bloodbending on Hama to save Aang and Sokka. Toph arrives with the villagers, who arrest Hama. As she is led away, Hama gleefully congratulates Katara on learning bloodbending. Katara weeps while Aang and Sokka comfort her beneath the full moon.
49	9	"Nightmares and Daydreams"	Ethan Spaulding	John O'Bryan	Oreste Canestrelli, Miyuki Hoshikawa, Dean Kelly, Kim Sang-Jin & Ethan Spaulding	November 16, 2007 (Note: This episode was first released in the United Kingdom on October 26, 2007.)	309	N/A
The group arrives at the rendezvous point for the invasion, with four days to spare. This realization causes Aang to become increasingly stressed about confronting Ozai. After having a nightmare about a failed invasion, Aang comes to believe he is not fully prepared and sacrifices his sleep and sanity in order to train. After three days of no sleep and continuing nightmares and hallucinations, it takes the collaboration of Sokka, Toph and Katara to convince Aang to trust his preparation. Meanwhile, Zuko enjoys time spent with Mai and a pampered lifestyle in the palace, but becomes anxious upon learning that Azula has been invited to an upcoming war meeting while he has not. Not wanting to show up uninvited, Zuko decides not to go, but is ultimately requested to attend with a seat at his father's right hand. After the meeting, Zuko leaves visibly shaken, and confides with Mai that it was what he always wanted, but he did not feel like himself.
50	10	"The Day of Black Sun, Part 1: The Invasion"	Giancarlo Volpe	Michael Dante DiMartino	Michael Chang, Michael Dante DiMartino, Juan Meza-Leon, Yu Jae Myoung, Bobby Rubio & Giancarlo Volpe	November 30, 2007	310	3.77
51	11	"The Day of Black Sun, Part 2: The Eclipse"	Joaquim Dos Santos	Aaron Ehasz	Joaquim Dos Santos, Ian Graham, Lauren Montgomery, Kenji Ono & Kim Sang-Jin	November 30, 2007	311	3.77
Part 1: The Invasion: On the day of the eclipse, many allies featured in previous episodes, including the swampbenders, Haru and his father, the Mechanist and his son Teo, and Pipsqueak and The Duke reunite with Team Avatar to launch the invasion of the Fire Nation. Aang kisses Katara as a sign of his strong feelings for her, worried that he may not return. Meanwhile, Zuko leaves a letter to Mai, and tells a portrait of his mother that he is finally going to set things right. The invasion force successfully circumvent several layers of Fire Nation defenses and reach the capital shores, where they begin a grueling assault towards the palace under constant onslaught from Fire Nation forces. Katara and Sokka's father Hakoda is injured in battle, forcing Sokka to assume command of their forces. Aang reaches the Fire Lord's palace, only to find both it and the entire capital city abandoned. Part 2: The Eclipse: Aang, Sokka and Toph search for the Fire Lord inside his secret bunker under the volcano but find only Azula, who simply flees with help from Dai Li agents, trying to stall them until the eclipse concludes. Elsewhere, Zuko confronts his father, denouncing Ozai's treatment of him as cruel, praising Iroh's teachings and fatherly guidance, and revealing his plan to join the Avatar and help him defeat Ozai. As Zuko tries to leave, Ozai reveals what happened to Zuko's mother Ursa to keep him in place: she learned that Zuko's grandfather, Fire Lord Azulon, had commanded Ozai to kill Zuko as punishment for Ozai trying to circumvent Iroh's birthright to the throne. Ursa proposed to remove Azulon so that Zuko would be spared and Ozai would inherit the throne, which Ozai accepted on the condition that she be banished for treason. As Ozai finishes the tale, the eclipse ends and he attacks Zuko with lightning; Zuko redirects it back at him as taught by Iroh and flees, intent on freeing his uncle. However, Iroh has already escaped prison by the time he arrives. The Fire Nation counterattacks with an advanced fleet of airships and war balloons. The exhausted invasion force has no choice but to surrender. Aang flees with his friends at the urging of Hakoda, alongside the youngest members of the invasion force, to the Western Air Temple with Zuko following in a stolen balloon. Note: Part 1 first premiered on November 23, 2007, in Belgium and the Netherlands, while Part 2 later premiered on November 26.
52	12	"The Western Air Temple"	Ethan Spaulding	Elizabeth Welch & Tim Hedrick	Oreste Canestrelli, Miyuki Hoshikawa, Dean Kelly, Lauren Montgomery & Ethan Spaulding	July 14, 2008 (Note: This episode was first released on Book 3: Volume 3 DVD on May 6, 2008.)	312	N/A
Zuko approaches Aang and his friends at the Western Air Temple, with the intention to join their group and teach Aang firebending. He desperately tries to prove to them that he has changed for the better, however they furiously reject Zuko due to his past actions. After he leaves, Toph challenges the others for dismissing him so quickly when Aang is in desperate need of a Firebending teacher. She eventually decides to speak to Zuko herself, but she accidentally startles him in his sleep, causing Zuko to reflexively firebend at her and burn her feet. Toph crawls back to the temple for help, where Sokka decides they must go after Zuko in retaliation. Team Avatar is nearly killed upon the sudden arrival of Combustion Man, but Zuko intervenes and affects his aim just enough to save them. Sokka defeats Combustion Man by hitting him in the third eye with his boomerang, causing the assassin to blow himself apart. While the group does allow Zuko to join them, they are still reluctant and skeptical. An embittered Katara warns Zuko that she will kill him if he betrays them or hurts Aang again. Note: This episode first premiered on December 14, 2007, in Canada.
53	13	"The Firebending Masters"	Giancarlo Volpe	John O'Bryan	Michael Chang, Johane Matte, Juan Meza-Leon, Kim Sang-Jin & Giancarlo Volpe	July 15, 2008	313	N/A
Zuko tries to teach Aang how to firebend, but he has lost his own ability to bend as he is no longer reliant on rage, the previous source of his firebending. Toph suggests they learn from the original source of firebending, revealed to be the dragons, who first imparted their knowledge to a seemingly-extinct civilization called the Sun Warriors. Aang and Zuko travel to Sun Warriors' ruins, where Zuko reveals that Sozin began the tradition of hunting dragons for glory to the point of extinction, with the last dragon being conquered by Iroh. After being caught in a trap, Aang and Zuko discover the Sun Warriors still exist. The chief agrees to teach them the ways of the Sun, having the pair each carry a sacred flame up the mountain to meet the masters Ran and Shaw, a pair of surviving dragons. The dragons deem Aang and Zuko worthy after they successfully perform an ancient routine called 'The Dancing Dragon' they learned along the way, and engulf them in a column of rainbow fire; Aang and Zuko realize that fire can bring energy and life, not just destruction. The tribe tells the pair that Iroh was the last outsider deemed worthy by the dragons, and claimed to have killed the final dragon to protect Ran and Shaw. Both Aang and Zuko begin to firebend again, stronger than ever before. Note: This episode first premiered on January 4, 2008, in Canada.
54	14	"The Boiling Rock"	Joaquim Dos Santos	May Chan	Joaquim Dos Santos, Ian Graham, Lauren Montgomery, Kenji Ono & Yu Jae Myoung	July 16, 2008	314	3.97
55	15	"The Boiling Rock"	Ethan Spaulding	Joshua Hamilton	Oreste Canestrelli, Michael Dante DiMartino, Miyuki Hoshikawa, Dean Kelly, Ethan Spaulding, Kim Sang-Jin & Bryan Konietzko	July 16, 2008	315	3.97
Part 1: To find Sokka's father Hakoda, Sokka and Zuko infiltrate the Fire Nation's top prison, the Boiling Rock, located on an island surrounded by a boiling lake. Unfortunately, they crash their balloon on arrival and cannot easily leave. They disguise themselves as guards and begin asking around about Water Tribe prisoners; while there are none, the pair discovers Suki is in the prison. Zuko's cover is blown while Sokka and Suki reunite, and the warden, who turns out to be Mai's uncle, recognizes him. He informs Zuko that in due time he will be handed back over to Ozai. A fellow prisoner, Chit Sang, overhears Sokka, Suki and Zuko discussing their escape plan, and forces his way in. Sokka plans to use one of the insulated coolers, used to punish prisoners who firebend, as a boat to cross the lake. As they prepare to leave, Sokka and Zuko overhear that a new batch of prisoners will arrive at dawn, potentially including Hakoda. Sokka, Suki and Zuko decide to stay behind and wait, while Chit Sang sets sail in the cooler but is soon caught. Hakoda is revealed to be among the new prisoners. Part 2: Sokka reunites with his father and begins brainstorming a new escape plan: They decide to take the warden hostage during a prison riot and escape on the gondola to the other side of the lake. Chit Sang is interrogated and reveales that a disguised guard helped his attempted escape, but claims it is a guard who had previously placed him in the cooler to save Sokka, and rejoins the group after starting the riot. Mai arrives and confronts Zuko about breaking up with her through a letter, calling him a traitor to the Fire Nation. When the commotion of the riot breaks out, Zuko traps Mai in a cell and leaves to help his friends. Suki kidnaps and ties up the warden, and the group successfully board the gondola, but are pursued by Azula and Ty Lee. The warden breaks free and orders his guards to cut the gondola's cable line. Azula and Ty Lee escape to watch the group's demise, but Mai intervenes at the last second to subdue the guards and allow their escape. Mai calmly tells Azula that she loves Zuko more than she fears her. In retaliation, Azula moves to strike Mai, but is chi-blocked by Ty Lee. Azula furiously orders both of them to be thrown in prison. Sokka and Zuko return to the Western Air Temple with Hakoda, Suki, and Chit Sang by stealing Azula's airship, reuniting Katara, Sokka, and Hakoda once again.
56	16	"The Southern Raiders"	Joaquim Dos Santos	Elizabeth Welch	Dae Kang Sung, Joaquim Dos Santos, Ian Graham, Lauren Montgomery, Kenji Ono & Yu Jae Myoung	July 17, 2008	316	4.23
Azula ambushes the group at the Western Air Temple, forcing them to split up once more: Hakoda and Chit Sang flee in the stolen Fire Nation airship with Teo, Haru and The Duke, while Suki, Zuko and Team Avatar blast their way past Azula and escape to safety. Though most of the group have seen enough to welcome Zuko into their team, Katara distrusts him and furiously reminds him that she was the first one to trust him back in Ba Sing Se, only to be betrayed. Zuko decides to help Katara find the group of soldiers responsible for her mother's death, The Southern Raiders, whom he identified after Sokka described their ships. Aang warns Katara not to give into revenge, but allows her to take Appa, believing she needs to confront her mother's killer for closure. On the journey to find them, Katara's behavior becomes increasingly aggressive, even resorting to bloodbending the current commander of The Southern Raiders. He tells them that the previous commander, Yon Rha, retired four years previous. When Katara and Zuko track down Yon Rha, he reveals that Katara's mother Kya named herself as the last remaining Southern waterbender to protect Katara. Despite Katara's desire for revenge, she is unable to bring herself to kill Yon Rha. Katara finally forgives Zuko and accepts his friendship. Zuko acknowledges to Aang that violence was not the answer to Katara's problem, but asks what he will do when he finally faces Ozai, leaving Aang visibly shaken.
57	17	"The Ember Island Players"	Giancarlo Volpe	Tim Hedrick, Joshua Hamilton & John O'Bryan	Michael Chang, Johane Matte, Juan Meza-Leon, Giancarlo Volpe, Young Jung Hye & Yu Jae Myoung	July 18, 2008	317	4.53
Sokka and Suki learn that the Ember Island Players, a Fire Nation theater group, is debuting a play based upon the group's adventures. The play turns out to be Fire Nation propaganda, and although the audience enjoys the play, Aang and his friends are embarrassed by the inaccurate and exaggerated portrayals of themselves (with the sole exception of Toph, who is amused by her depiction as a muscular man who employs a primitive form of sonar by yelling at everything). In context, the play also serves as a concise summary of Aang's entire journey throughout the show. Sokka is invested enough in the play to instruct the actor portraying him how Sokka would really act. The play ends with the Fire Nation winning the war, Azula killing Zuko and the Fire Lord killing the Avatar, who is portrayed by a girl, which triggers a standing ovation from the audience and frightens Aang. Zuko sees the play as a reminder of his past mistreatment towards Iroh, to which Toph tells him about her meeting with Iroh, how he wanted Zuko to find his own path, and that his presence with the group meant that he fulfilled his uncle's wishes. Aang also confronts Katara about where they stand with each other, having kissed at the invasion. Katara expresses that she is unsure, and is shocked when Aang kisses her again.
58	18	"Sozin's Comet, Part 1: The Phoenix King"	Ethan Spaulding	Michael Dante DiMartino	Oreste Canestrelli, Michael Dante DiMartino, Elsa Garagarza, Miyuki Hoshikawa, Dean Kelly, Lauren Montgomery, Seung-Hyun Oh, Ethan Spaulding & Yu Jae Myoung	July 19, 2008	318	5.59
59	19	"Sozin's Comet, Part 2: The Old Masters"	Giancarlo Volpe	Aaron Ehasz	Michael Chang, Johane Matte, Juan Meza-Leon, Yu Jae Myoung, Seung-Hyun Oh & Giancarlo Volpe	July 19, 2008	319	5.59
60	20	"Sozin's Comet, Part 3: Into the Inferno"	Joaquim Dos Santos	Michael Dante DiMartino & Bryan Konietzko	Joaquim Dos Santos, Dean Kelly, Bryan Konietzko, Lauren Montgomery, Seung-Hyun Oh & Ethan Spaulding	July 19, 2008	320	5.59
61	21	"Sozin's Comet, Part 4: Avatar Aang"	Joaquim Dos Santos	Michael Dante DiMartino & Bryan Konietzko	Michael Dante DiMartino, Joaquim Dos Santos, Dean Kelly, Bryan Konietzko, Lauren Montgomery, Seung-Hyun Oh & Ethan Spaulding	July 19, 2008	321	5.59
Part 1: The Phoenix King: Aang has decided to fight Ozai after Sozin's Comet passes, needing more time to master firebending. Zuko derails this plan by revealing that his father intends to burn the entire Earth Kingdom continent to ashes with the comet's power, having learned of this plan from the war meeting on the day before the eclipse. The gang begins a frantic training regimen while Aang struggles with his responsibilities: his friends instruct him to simply kill Ozai, but Aang clings to the pacifist beliefs of his Air Nomad heritage. In his sleep, Aang is drawn towards a mysterious island and is followed by Momo. The next day, Aang's friends search all of Ember Island for Aang with no success. Desperate, Zuko takes them to find June the bounty hunter to attempt to locate Aang. June's pet shirshu is unable to track Aang's scent at all, leading June to say that Aang no longer exists but is not dead. Ozai bequeaths the Fire Nation throne to Azula and declares himself "The Phoenix King", supreme ruler of the world, while Aang awakens on the unknown island. Part 2: The Old Masters: On the island, Aang seeks guidance from his past incarnations, but they too suggest he may have to take violent action against Ozai to protect the world. Zuko asks June to find Iroh using an old sandal; she leads them to the outer wall of Ba Sing Se. There they meet King Bumi (who escaped and liberated Omashu during the eclipse), Jeong Jeong, Master Pakku, and Master Piandao, all of whom are revealed to be members of the Order of the White Lotus, a secret society led by Iroh that "transcends the division of the four nations". Zuko and Iroh tearfully reunite, with Iroh revealing his pride in Zuko for discovering his own path to redemption. The team decides to split up to stall the Fire Nation's plans, realizing that Aang will have to face Ozai directly: Katara and Zuko will face Azula at the Royal Palace; Sokka, Suki and Toph will attempt to stop the airship fleet bound for the Earth Kingdom, and Iroh is to lead the White Lotus in the liberation of Ba Sing Se. The island Aang is on is revealed to be a giant lion turtle, who passes on his wisdom to Aang before leaving him on the shores of the Earth Kingdom to wait for Ozai. As Sozin's Comet arrives, Ozai's airship fleet appears over the horizon with Aang standing ready. Part 3: Into the Inferno: Abandoned by her friends and father, Azula's mental stability begins to deteriorate as her coronation as Fire Lord approaches. She banishes much of her court, fearing everyone will betray her. Sokka, Suki and Toph arrive just as Ozai's airship fleet is lifting off, successfully boarding a ship with the help of Toph. They overpower the ship's crew and begin to take down the fleet. Iroh and the White Lotus arrive at Ba Sing Se to wipe out the Fire Nation presence once and for all. Zuko and Katara confront Azula at her coronation, where Azula challenges him to an Agni Kai. Their fighting engulfs the palace, and when Zuko gains the upper hand, Azula decides to target Katara with a lightning strike. Zuko jumps in to protect her and is badly wounded. Meanwhile, Aang finally confronts Ozai, but is quickly put on the defensive without the Avatar State. Aang is presented with an opportunity to redirect Ozai's lightning back at him, but chooses not to strike. Continuously forced to retreat by Ozai, Aang is seemingly trapped while taking refuge inside a ball of rock as Ozai tries to force him out. Part 4: Avatar Aang: The Order of the White Lotus liberates Ba Sing Se, while Sokka, Suki and Toph disable the Fire Nation attack armada. Katara takes over fighting Azula, eventually immobilizing her in ice to chain her to a grate in the ground, then rushes to heal Zuko. They watch with pity as Azula suffers a full mental breakdown. Ozai accidentally causes Aang to enter the Avatar State by knocking him into a rock that pierces his lightning wound, unlocking his chakras. Aang easily overwhelms Ozai, yet still refuses to kill him, instead harnessing "energybending", learned from the lion turtle, to permanently strip Ozai of his firebending abilities and render him powerless. In an epilogue sequence, newly crowned Fire Lord Zuko declares the war over. He and Mai reconcile, and he confronts his father in prison, angrily asking where his mother, Ursa is. Ty Lee is shown to have joined the Kyoshi Warriors while teaching them chi-blocking from prison. Some time later, "Team Avatar" celebrate together at Iroh's tea shop in Ba Sing Se. Slipping out to share a quiet moment together, Aang and Katara embrace and kiss under the sunset. Note 1: In animation, it is followed by the spin-off sequel series The Legend of Korra, taking place around 70 years later and focusing on the next Avatar. Note 2: The episode was dedicated to Dante DiMartino father of series co-creator Michael Dante DiMartino.

== Production ==
The season was produced by Nickelodeon Animation Studio and aired on Nickelodeon, both of which are owned by Viacom (now Paramount Global). The season's executive producers and co-creators were Michael Dante DiMartino and Bryan Konietzko, who worked alongside head writer and co-producer Aaron Ehasz. Most of the individual episodes were directed by Ethan Spaulding, Lauren MacMullan and Giancarlo Volpe. Episodes were written by a team of writers, which consisted of Aaron Ehasz, Elizabeth Welch, Tim Hedrick, and John O'Bryan, along with creators DiMartino and Konietzko.

The season's music was composed by "The Track Team", which consists of Jeremy Zuckerman and Benjamin Wynn, who were known to the show's creators because Zuckerman was Konietzko's roommate.

== Cast ==
All of the central characters generally remained the same: Zach Tyler Eisen voices Avatar Aang, Mae Whitman voices Katara, Jack DeSena voices Sokka, Michaela Jill Murphy voices Toph Beifong, Dante Basco voices Zuko, Dee Bradley Baker voices Appa and Momo, and Grey DeLisle voices Azula.

Additionally, Mark Hamill reprises his role as Fire Lord Ozai in a greater capacity after having minor appearances throughout the first and second seasons of the series, while Greg Baldwin now voices Iroh due to Mako Iwamatsu's death.

== Reception ==
The season received critical acclaim, winning a 2008 Peabody Award. Jamie S. Rich from DVD Talk remarked, "In addition to the solid writing, Avatar the Last Airbender [sic] also has amazing animation. The character designs, with its roots in classic Asian folklore, are colorful and inventive, and the overall animation is smooth and consistently executed". Jamie S. Rich wrote in another review:

This final season in the trilogy is turning out to be the best... At this point in the story, major things are happening, with the characters going through changes and the various plot elements coming together. Thankfully, the show creators never rest, and the quality control is top-notch. The writing is smart, and the animation always impressive. (2008)

Henrik Batallones, a BuddyTV Staff Columnist, also noted the wide variety of positive reviews from the press for the series finale, noting that sources such as The New York Times and Toon Zone gave Avatar: The Last Airbender "glowing reviews".

The season also received praise for its video, redemption of Zuko, and sound quality. Nick Lyons from DVD Talk felt that the video quality appeared better than previous seasons, which had also garnered additional awards. He also remarks that the sound is "spot on...as per usual." At the 2008 Annie Awards, the season won "Best Animated Television Production for Children". At the same Annie Awards, Joaquim Dos Santos won the "Best Directing in an Animated Television Production" caption for his directing in "Into the Inferno". Joaquim Dos Santos also gave Avatar: The Last Airbender a nomination at Annecy 2008 for his work with "The Day of Black Sun Part 2: The Eclipse". Additionally, music editor and composer Jeremy Zuckerman and the sound editing team were nominated a Golden Reel award for "Best Sound Editing in a Television Animation" for their work in "Avatar Aang".

== Home media release ==
The first three DVD volumes contain five episodes each, and the fourth volume contains six. A later boxed set contained all four volumes. The first DVD was released on October 30, 2007, and the complete boxed set was released on September 16, 2008. They are released by Paramount Home Entertainment. Each of the individual Season Three DVDs also comes complete with an exclusive comic book. The Complete Book 3 Collection DVD includes the following DVD extras: Inside Sozin's Comet: Exclusive Four-Part Commentary by Creators, The Women of Avatar: The Last Airbender, Book 3 Finale Pencil Test Animation and Into the Fire Nation at San Diego Comic-Con. The boxed set was released on February 1, 2010, in the United Kingdom.

Volume	Discs	Episodes	Region 1 release	Region 2 release	Region 4 release
1	1	5	October 30, 2007	Not released	June 1, 2010
2	1	5	January 22, 2008	Not released	September 23, 2010
3	1	5	May 6, 2008	Not released	October 7, 2010
4	1	6	July 29, 2008	Not released	November 4, 2010
Box set	5	21	September 16, 2008	February 1, 2010	December 2, 2010

== Other Media ==
=== Soundtrack ===
In 2026, the soundtrack to the third and final season was released.
