= The Firebending Masters =

- Avatar: The Last Airbender episode
- Zuko and Aang observe the dragons' rainbow fire and learn the true meaning of firebending.
- Episode no.: Season 3 Episode 13
- Directed by: Giancarlo Volpe
- Written by: John O'Bryan
- Production code: 313
- Original air date: July 15, 2008 (Note: This episode was first released in Book 3: Volume 3 DVD on May 6, 2008.)

Guest appearances
- Robert Ito as Sun Warrior chief; Brian Tochi as Ham Ghao

Episode chronology
← Previous "The Western Air Temple"	Next → "The Boiling Rock, Part 1"
- Avatar: The Last Airbender season 3

"The Firebending Masters" is the thirteenth episode of the third season of the American animated television series Avatar: The Last Airbender, and the 53rd episode overall. The episode, written by John O'Bryan and directed by Giancarlo Volpe, follows Aang and Zuko travelling to the abandoned city of the Sun Warriors to find knowledge about the origin of firebending so Zuko can begin teaching Aang. The episode originally released in Canada on January 4, 2008, and later released on DVD on May 6 of that year, before its official premiere in the United States on Nickelodeon on July 15, 2008. The episode received critical acclaim from many critics and fans.

== Plot ==
While preparing to teach Aang how to firebend, (Note: As depicted in "The Western Air Temple") Zuko discovers that his powers have suddenly weakened. Aang hypothesizes that Zuko must not have enough rage to create fire like he used to, but Zuko states that he no longer wants to rely on such emotions. Toph Beifong recounts how she learned earthbending from the original practitioners, the badgermoles, resulting in her becoming a prodigy. She encourages Zuko to seek out the original firebenders, only for him to reveal that they, the dragons, are long extinct. Instead, he and Aang seek out the ruins of the Sun Warriors, the first humans to learn firebending.

At the ruins, Zuko reveals that the dragons were hunted to extinction at the encouragement of his great-grandfather, Fire Lord Sozin, and that the last dragon was slain by his uncle, Iroh. After opening a chamber in the ruins, Aang and Zuko imitate a dance depicted by a series of statues to uncover a pedestal with a large, egg-shaped gem. Zuko picks it up, triggering a trap that encases him and Aang in slime. They are apprehended by the Sun Warriors, who had been living in secret. The tribe instruct Aang and Zuko to carry pieces of an eternal flame to the masters Ran and Shaw; Aang, who burned Katara's hands during a prior attempt at firebending, (Note: As depicted in "The Deserter") hesitates. However, the Sun Warriors' chief successfully encourages him, explaining how fire can represent life as well as destruction.

Although Aang and Zuko successfully reach Ran and Shaw's lair, they accidentally extinguish their flames after Aang gets distracted. However, the masters emerge anyway, revealing themselves as two dragons. After Aang and Zuko repeat their dance from earlier, the dragons create a whirlwind of rainbow fire, teaching their pupils that firebending is an embrace of light and energy. The chief reveals that Iroh lied about killing the dragons and instead learnt the knowledge from Ran and Shaw and let them live. Zuko realizes he was relying on anger, rage and the will to capture Aang to be his "inner fire", but instead decides to draw from the true source, his desire to bring balance to the world. Aang, realizing that fire is much more than destruction and death, is able to firebend as well. The two return to the Western Air Temple and showcase "the Dancing Dragon," which Aang's friends mock thanks to it looking like a dance.

== Credits ==
Main cast members Zach Tyler Eisen, Mae Whitman, Jack DeSena, Jessie Flower, Dante Basco and Dee Bradley Baker appear as the voices of Aang, Katara, Sokka, Toph Beifong, Zuko, and Appa respectively. Appearing as guests are Robert Ito as the Sun Warrior chief, and Brian Tochi as Ham Ghao, a member of the Sun Warriors.

The episode was directed by Giancarlo Volpe and written by John O'Bryan.

== Production ==
The animation was done by MOI Animation.

The episode aired as part of the promotional event "Countdown to the Comet" where episodes of the show aired all week in the leadup to the four-part series finale on July 19, 2008. Because of this, this episode is the only episode of the show to air on a Tuesday. However, it was originally released in Canada six months earlier on January 4, and was released on DVD on May 6 before its Nickelodeon premiere. The episode includes many references and allusions to other pieces of media and historical and religious stories. When the glowing artefact appears in front of Aang and Zuko, Aang tells Zuko he is "very suspicious of giant glowing gems sitting on pedestals" referencing the opening sequence of the 1981 film Raiders of the Lost Ark.

The episode also introduces the Sun Warrior tribe, whose architecture resembles the Aztec society as well as incorporating some aspects of Indian Buddha Stupas and Tibetan monasteries. The idea the Sun Warriors have of an eternal fire that should never go out is a common idea in many religions, such as in the Hebrew Bible. The Sun Warriors also seem to use a Shofar, an ancient musical horn typically made of a ram's horn, used for Jewish religious purposes.

In the series, firebending is based on the martial art Northern Shaolin kung fu. In this episode however, "the Dancing Dragon", a type of firebending form, bears resemblance to the Southern Dragon kung fu style 'Long Ying Mo Kui', which was based on a mythical Chinese dragon. The final movement of the form also bears resemblance to the "Fusion" move from Dragon Ball Z (1989-1996).

== Reception ==
The episode received critical acclaim from fans and critics, with many considering it one of the best of the show.

Hayden Childs of The A.V. Club praised the episode, stating "While the idea of splitting the Aang Gang up to have individual adventures with Zuko may seem more like a series of one-offs than an arc, there is the sense that the Aang Gang needs to reach closure on some issues before they will truly be ready to shut down the Fire Nation War for good." Tony Ireland Mell of IGN gave the episode a rating of 8.3 out of 10, writing that "I thought that the pay off with the last two dragons, and Aang and Zuko's path to enlightenment was a little weak, and didn't provide me enough visual information. I would have liked to have seen some sort of rapid history of true Firebending in the "good fire" or in their eyes as they are watching it, but they did sort of make up for it with their revelations on what Firebending is."

Sam Cheeda of Screen Rant placed the episode as it the eighth-best of the show, stating that "The episode is notable for presenting a big piece of Avatar’s lore, as fans got to see the firebending masters. It also went a long way in establishing Aang and Zuko’s alliance, which would have been impossible to consider when the series first began with Zuko as an antagonist." Christian Holub and Rachel Yang from Entertainment Weekly ranked the episode as the twelfth-best of the show, praising the reevaluation of firebending with Holub writing "One of the great joys of Book 3's final stretch is showing how things don't have to be that way. By journeying to meet the Sun Warriors tribe and the last dragons they're protecting, Aang and Zuko learn that fire can also be beautiful, colorful, and life-sustaining. Far from being inevitable, Firelord Ozai's reign of terror is a perversion of the world (a good reminder in our own age of seemingly endless war)."

Max Nicholson of IGN ranked the episode as the seventh-best of the show, writing that "It was cool to see Aang and Zuko work together again (this time on purpose), especially given their violent history together. This was really the first time we got to see Zuko proving his loyalty to Aang -- and what better way to do that than explore some ancient ruins together?" Rotem Rusak also placed the episode on their list of favorite episodes (not ranked), praising the animation calling it "second to none" and stating "It all comes together emotionally but remains infused with that trademark ATLA humor."

In 2020, Millie Mae Mealy of The Harvard Crimson ranked the episode as the 11th best of the show, writing that "Now that Zuko has joined the Gaang, Aang and Zuko are finally in harmony with themselves and each other. So as they stand to learn the truth of firebending from the last surviving dragons, we hear the end credits swell in the middle of the episode — because we are so close to the end, and Aang and Zuko are so nearly ready."
