= The Day of Black Sun =

- Avatar: The Last Airbender episodes
- Promotional image by Lauren Montgomery.
- Episode nos.: Season 3 Episodes 10/11
- Directed by: Giancarlo Volpe (Part One); Joaquim Dos Santos (Part Two)
- Written by: Michael Dante DiMartino (Part One); Aaron Ehasz (Part Two)
- Production code: 310/311
- Original air date: November 30, 2007

Guest appearances
- André Sogliuzzo as Hakoda; Richard McGonagle as Bato; René Auberjonois as the mechanist; Daniel Samonas as Teo; Serena Williams as Ming; Wayne Duvall as Warden Poon; Michael Dow as Haru; Kevin Michael Richardson as Tyro; Carlos Alazraqui as Due, Tho; William H. Bassett as Huu; Mick Foley as the Boulder; Sterling Young as Pipsqueak; Nick Swoboda as The Duke; Kristoffer Tabori as war minister

Episode chronology
← Previous "Nightmares and Daydreams"	Next → "The Western Air Temple"
- Avatar: The Last Airbender season 3

"The Day of Black Sun, Part 1: The Invasion" and "The Day of Black Sun, Part 2: The Eclipse" are the tenth and eleventh episodes of the third season of the American animated television series Avatar: The Last Airbender, and the 50th and the 51st episode overall. The show follows Aang (Zach Tyler Eisen), the last airbender and the Avatar, on his journey to bring balance to a war-torn world by mastering all four elements: air, water, earth, and fire. On his quest, he is joined by companions Katara (Mae Whitman), Sokka (Jack DeSena), and Toph Beifong (Jessie Flower). The season also follows Zuko (Dante Basco) as he returns to the Fire Nation only to face his conflicting feelings about his part in the war.

The first part of the episode was directed by Giancarlo Volpe and written by co-creator Michael Dante DiMartino, and follows Aang, Sokka and Hakoda leading an invasion on the Fire Nation, on "The Day of Black Sun" where the firebenders will lose their bending due to a solar eclipse. The second part was directed by Joaquim Dos Santos and written by head writer Aaron Ehasz, following the beginning of the eclipse, and Zuko standing up to his father Fire Lord Ozai (Mark Hamill). The episodes premiered on November 23 and 26, 2007 respectively in the Netherlands and Belgium, before releasing on Nickelodeon in the United States on November 30 of that year. They were watched by 3.77 million viewers, and received critical acclaim.

== Plot ==
=== Part 1 ===
The day of the invasion arrives, but Aang reveals he cannot enter the Avatar State, as his final chakra was blocked when Azula shot him with lightning. (Note: As depicted in "The Crossroads of Destiny") Meanwhile in the Fire Nation, Zuko flees from home, promising to a painting of his mother, Ursa, that he will amend for his mistakes. Shedding their Fire Nation disguises, the fleet sneak into the capital with submarines, but are attacked by enemy troops; Aang kisses Katara and confesses his feelings in case he doesn't survive before flying away. The fleet reach land and battle Fire Nation troops. Hakoda is injured in battle, forcing Sokka to lead the invasion instead. Aang enters Fire Lord Ozai's palace, only to find it empty; Sokka concludes that Ozai expected the attack and is hiding in an underground bunker. Bato takes the reins of the fleet while Aang, Sokka, and Toph Beifong search for Ozai.

=== Part 2 ===
Toph finds the bunker inside a nearby volcano, and the three enter as the eclipse starts. The fleet captures much of the capital, while Aang and his friends find Azula in Ozai's place. She reveals she knew about the invasion for months and is unsurprised that Aang survived. Although the heroes corner Azula in a fight, they realize that she was simply stalling until the eclipse ends. Azula taunts Sokka by revealing Suki's imprisonment, and Sokka unsuccessfully attempts to make Azula reveal where she is. Meanwhile, Zuko enters Ozai's chamber, explaining that Azula was the one who "killed" Aang, who is actually still alive. Zuko defies and denounces his father, condemning his abusive treatment of him and vowing to help Aang. Ozai reveals that he nearly killed Zuko on Azulon's orders, (Note: As depicted in "Zuko Alone") only for Ursa to kill Azulon instead to protect her son, for which she was banished. The eclipse ends and a fight breaks out between the pair.

Realizing what is happening, Azula escapes with firebending. Aang evacuates, realizing he isn't ready to face Ozai. The fleet attempt to retreat, but are cornered by airships. Zuko rushes to free his uncle, Iroh, only to find that he already escaped after furtive and intense training. (Note: As depicted in "Sokka's Master") On Hakoda's orders, Aang flees to the Western Air Temple on Appa with Katara, Sokka, Toph, Haru, Teo, and the Duke while the rest surrender. Zuko follows closely behind.

== Credits ==
Main cast members Zach Tyler Eisen, Mae Whitman, Jack DeSena, Jessie Flower, Dante Basco and Dee Bradley Baker appear as the voices of Aang, Katara, Sokka, Toph Beifong, Zuko, and Appa respectively. Appearing as guests in both parts are André Sogliuzzo as Hakoda, Richard McGonagle as Bato, René Auberjonois as the mechanist, Daniel Samonas as Teo, Wayne Duvall as Warden Poon, Michael Dow as Haru, Kevin Michael Richardson as both Tyro and the Hippo, Carlos Alazraqui as Due and Tho, William H. Bassett as Huu, Sterling Young as Pipsqueak, and Nick Swoboda as The Duke. Appearing as guests in only the first part are Greg Baldwin as Iroh, Serena Williams as Ming, and Mick Foley as the Boulder. Appearing as guests in only the second part are Mark Hamill as Fire Lord Ozai, Grey DeLisle as Azula, and Kristoffer Tabori as a war minister.

The first part of the episode was directed by Giancarlo Volpe and written by co-creator Michael Dante DiMartino, while the second part was directed by Joaquim Dos Santos and written by head writer Aaron Ehasz.

== Production ==
The animation was done by JM Animation for the first part, and MOI Animation for the second part.

When promoting the episode, just as they had done for "The Secret of the Fire Nation", Nickelodeon promoted the episode greatly by creating a website with links to a tournament and wallpaper downloads. The website even included an online game called Black Sun Siege which released on November 29, 2007. The episode also introduces submarines into the world of Avatar, inspired by pre-Cold War and World War II submarines in that they have limited air supply, or the Higgins boat used in World War II. The idea of Ozai hiding in a secret bunker bears similarities to how Adolf Hitler used his bunker during World War II. When the invasion force soldiers march up the volcano towards the Fire Nation, parallels can be drawn in regards to how they hold their shields above their heads in a formation reminiscent of the Roman Testudo formation.

== Reception ==
The episode received critical acclaim from fans and critics, with many considering it one of the best of the show.

Hayden Childs of The A.V. Club praised Zuko's speech in the episode, calling it "the emotional heart of these episodes" and commenting: "He lays out carefully how Ozai wronged him with the banishment and Agni Kai, which shows just how far he has come since the beginning. He points out that Sozin's idea that the Fire Nation's war is for the good of the world is still being taught to the people, but that it is a lie. This is not just a talking point to help out the young people watching, but another sign of how Zuko has outgrown his brainwashing. Ozai is too monstrous to understand any of this, of course, but it is only right that Zuko, who has the most compelling arc of any character on the show, should have a chance to say his piece to his father." Max Nicholson of IGN gave the episodes ratings of 8.5 and 8.8 out of 10 respectively, writing that Part 1 "delivered a great half-hour of invasion antics, as Team Avatar launched their attack on the Fire Nation. Not only did this episode feature tons of returning allies, but it also included great moments for them" and that Part 2 "offered a solid conclusion to the "Day of Black Sun" two-parter and set the final events of the series in motion."

Chris Harkin of Game Rant placed the second part of the episode as the eighth best episode of the show with a score of 9.4 / 10, writing "The heartbreak for fans as the team suffered major losses and defeats paved the way for their underdog victory when Sozin's Comet arrived later in the season. In the meantime, Team Avatar found Azula and fought her agents, while Zuko found his father and learned the truth about his mother's fate." Sam Cheeda of Screen Rant placed the episode as it the fifth-best of the show, stating that "The episode is notable for showcasing the heroes on the backfoot when the invasion starts to slip through their grasp and the advantage goes to the Fire Nation. With Ozai making an appearance, the two-parter was by no means playing around and the conflict came across as a big-time event."

In 2020, Millie Mae Mealy of The Harvard Crimson ranked the first and second parts of the episode as the 15th and 3rd best episodes of the show respectively, praising Sokka's competence and ability to design a submarine, the heroes losing and the repercussions of it, and the climax of Zuko's character arc, writing that "Zuko's confrontation with his father is epic. Lightning represents the abuse of his father and his family — with his Uncle's love and support, Zuko learns to let that lightning pass through him without hurting him and chooses not to take vengeance on his father. Zuko stands up to his father and tells him that he was abusive and wrong. He knows his worth, and now he is going to do the right thing no matter the consequences. Zuko's redemption arc is exceptional and this is a brilliant moment that shows just how far he has come."

For his work directing the second part of the episode, Joaquim Dos Santos was nominated at Annecy in 2008.

The episode has caused topics like the show or 'Fire Nation' to trend whenever there is a solar eclipse, such as during the "Great American Eclipse" on August 21, 2017.
