= Sozin's Comet =

Series finale of Avatar: The Last Airbender

- Avatar: The Last Airbender episodes
- Cover of the book adaptation, Sozin's Comet: The Final Battle
- Episode nos.: Season 3 Episodes 18–21
- Directed by: Ethan Spaulding (1); Giancarlo Volpe (2); Joaquim Dos Santos (3 & 4)
- Written by: Michael Dante DiMartino (1, 3 & 4); Bryan Konietzko (3 & 4); Aaron Ehasz (2)
- Production code: 318–321
- Original air date: July 19, 2008
- Running time: 92 minutes

Guest appearances
- Jennie Kwan as Suki; Nick Jameson as Colonel Shinu; James Garrett as Avatar Roku; André Sogliuzzo as Bumi, Dai Li Captain; Victor Brandt as Pakku; Robert Patrick as Piandao; Keone Young as Jeong Jeong, High Sage; Jennifer Hale as Avatar Kyoshi, June; Kevin Michael Richardson as Lion Turtle; Tress MacNeille as Avatar Yangchen; Jim Meskimen as Avatar Kuruk; Jen Cohn as Ursa; Takayo Fischer as Lo and Li; Cricket Leigh as Mai; Olivia Hack as Ty Lee

Episode chronology
← Previous "The Ember Island Players"	Next → "The Promise, Part One"
- Avatar: The Last Airbender (season 3)

"Sozin's Comet" is the four-part series finale of the American animated fantasy action Nickelodeon television series Avatar: The Last Airbender, created by Michael Dante DiMartino and Bryan Konietzko. It was written by the creators alongside Aaron Ehasz, and directed by Ethan Spaulding, Giancarlo Volpe, and Joaquim Dos Santos. Although the finale is split into four episodes, it aired as a two-hour four-part film on July 19, 2008. The Saturday airing of "Sozin's Comet" acted as a climax to a week of ten new episodes that concluded Avatar's third season. Before the week of July 14–19, no episodes had been shown in the US since November 30, 2007, though some episodes had been released on DVD prior to their airdate. This is also considered a 92-minute television movie.

The finale focuses on series protagonist Avatar Aang's non-violent personality and his reluctance to kill Fire Lord Ozai, as shown throughout the series. The finale also follows the exploits of many of Aang's friends and allies, including Sokka, Toph and Suki's struggle to destroy a Fire Nation airship armada, Zuko and Katara's battle against Azula, and Iroh and the Order of the White Lotus' attempt to liberate the city of Ba Sing Se from Ozai's grasp.

"Sozin's Comet” received acclaim from critics and fans alike. The initial showing averaged 5.6 million viewers, a 195% increase compared to the previous year in its time period. The premieres of episodes beginning with "The Western Air Temple" throughout the week received over 19 million viewers, of which 5.6 million were from Sozin's Comet. At the 2008 Annie Awards, the director of the third part of "Sozin's Comet" won an award for "Best Directing in an Animated Television Production".

Although "Sozin's Comet" is the series finale, Avatar: The Last Airbender has continued as an ongoing graphic novel series published by Dark Horse Comics since January 2012, which takes place after the events of the finale and before the sequel series The Legend of Korra.

== Plot ==
=== Part 1: "The Phoenix King" ===
On Ember Island at the Royal Beach House, Avatar Aang proposes a beach party in lieu of training, explaining that he has decided to challenge Fire Lord Ozai only after Sozin's Comet and its enhancement of firebending have come and gone, due to his self-perceived inability to fight him on equal footing and the fact that the Fire Nation had all but won the war with the conquest of the Earth Kingdom capital of Ba Sing Se. Zuko, however, warns the group that his father is planning to use the comet's power to burn down the entire Earth Kingdom, revealing that he learned of his plans during the war meeting on the day before the eclipse on the Day of Black Sun. Alarmed at this news, Aang resolves to face him when the comet arrives. Sokka decides to have a simulation fight against a scarecrow, but Aang refuses to kill it due to his pacifistic nature and non-violent upbringing and berates his friends after they pointedly tell him that he has no choice but to kill Ozai.

That night, Aang sleepwalks to an offshore island that disappears in the morning. After the group fails to locate him, Zuko takes them to June, his former tracker who might be able to locate Aang. Meanwhile, Ozai proclaims himself to be ruler of the world, under the title "Phoenix King", and prepares an airship fleet to burn and rebuild the world under his new order. Azula intends to come with her father, but he instead passes on the mantle of Fire Lord to her, leaving his daughter behind in the Fire Nation. Aang awakens, finding himself and Momo on the island in the middle of the ocean.

=== Part 2: "The Old Masters" ===
Zuko's tracker, June, is unable to locate Aang, so the group instead decides to seek out Iroh. Zuko and Iroh reconcile after Zuko's earlier betrayal. It is revealed that he, along with previous mentor figures (earthbender Bumi, firebender Jeong Jeong, waterbender Pakku, and swordsmaster Piandao), are part of an otherwise non-aligned secret society known as the Order of the White Lotus, which plans to liberate the Earth Kingdom capital city from Fire Nation rule. Though Zuko asks Iroh to face Ozai, Iroh believes that, regardless if he could defeat his younger brother or not, only Aang can defeat Ozai to bring about a new era of peace. The group makes its plans: Zuko and Katara will confront Azula in the Fire Nation capital, while Sokka, Toph, and Suki will destroy Ozai's airship fleet. Elsewhere, Aang awakens on a floating island. Frustrated with his inability to find a way to defeat Ozai without killing him, he asks four of his past lives (Avatar Roku, Avatar Yangchen, Avatar Kuruk, and Avatar Kyoshi) for advice, but is unsatisfied with their answers. He discovers the island is actually a giant "lion turtle" and asks it for help; the lion turtle gives Aang the power of energybending and leaves him on the Earth Kingdom's shores. Ozai arrives with his airship fleet to destroy both the Earth Kingdom and Aang.

=== Part 3: "Into the Inferno" ===
Sozin's Comet appears in the sky as Azula prepares for her coronation. Abandoned by her father and still haunted by the betrayals of her former friends, Mai and Ty Lee, at the Boiling Rock, Azula's mental stability rapidly declines. She banishes her subjects and hallucinates an image of her mother, Ursa. Before she is crowned, Zuko and Katara arrive on Appa and Azula challenges her brother to an Agni Kai, to which he accepts. When Zuko gains the upper hand, Azula shoots lightning at the onlooking Katara; Zuko intercepts and deflects it, but is wounded and incapacitated in the process. Azula then attacks Katara, forcing her into the fight.

Meanwhile, Sokka, Toph, and Suki hijack a Fire Nation airship, and dispose of the crew while the rest of the fleet continue toward their target. In Ba Sing Se, the Order of the White Lotus, led by Iroh, Jeong Jeong, Bumi, & Piandao, lay siege to the Fire Nation forces within the city, with the intention of re-conquering it in the name of the Earth Kingdom. Dismissing Momo, Aang confronts Ozai and implores him to stop, but Ozai refuses and they begin to duel. Aang, still unable to bring himself to kill Ozai, is eventually forced to hide in an earth ball as Ozai taunts him and denounces the Air Nomads.

=== Part 4: "Avatar Aang" ===
After a fierce battle, Katara manages to defeat Azula and heals the wounded Zuko; the two then watch in pity as Azula suffers a complete mental breakdown. Meanwhile, the Order of the White Lotus successfully liberates Ba Sing Se. Sokka and Toph are cornered by the Fire Nation, causing Sokka to break his leg, but are saved by Suki who manages to destroy the remaining airships.

Ozai eventually manages to breach Aang's defenses and slams him against a rock, hitting the scar on his back from when Azula struck him down and inadvertently releasing his locked seventh chakra. This allows Aang to enter the Avatar State, and with the combined power of his past lives, he quickly overwhelms and subdues Ozai. Aang then uses energybending to render Ozai powerless as punishment for his crimes and those of previous Fire Lords Azulon and Sozin, while simultaneously staying true to the Air Nomads' pacifism. Victorious, Aang reunites with Sokka, Toph, and Suki, who mock Ozai as Sozin's Comet vanishes.

In the aftermath, Zuko is appointed as the new Fire Lord. During his coronation, Zuko promises to aid the world in the postwar reconstruction and reunites with Mai, while Ty Lee joins the Kyoshi Warriors. Zuko later visits the now-imprisoned Ozai, who refuses to disclose Ursa's whereabouts. The final scene depicts Aang, Katara, Sokka, Toph, Mai, Suki and Zuko gathering in Iroh's new tea shop: the Jasmine Dragon in Ba Sing Se. Aang and Katara share a kiss in the sunset, beginning a romantic relationship.

== Production ==
An elemental bending technique new to humans, energybending, is introduced. The blue and orange-colored illuminations represent the intense struggle between purification and corruption, a recurring theme within the series. From a development standpoint, Konietzko said that this scene was particularly difficult to realize.

Co-creators Michael Dante DiMartino and Bryan Konietzko wrote the majority of the finale; DiMartino wrote parts one, three, and four, and Konietzko assisted with parts three and four. Aaron Ehasz, co-executive producer and head writer of the show, wrote part two. Ethan Spaulding directed part one, Giancarlo Volpe directed part two, and Joaquim Dos Santos directed parts three and four. Dos Santos was nominated for an Annie Award for his directing of part three, "Into the Inferno". Although "Sozin's Comet" was originally written as a three-part story, the creators noticed that the length had grown beyond what they had predicted from the initial script. To avoid pacing issues, they split the final part in two, adding several scenes to fill the remaining time.

The cast of "Sozin's Comet" includes all of the key characters from season three. Protagonists Aang, Katara, Sokka, and Toph are voiced by Zach Tyler Eisen (in his final role before his retirement), Mae Whitman, Jack DeSena, and Jessie Flower respectively. Iroh is voiced by Greg Baldwin and Zuko is voiced by Dante Basco. Grey DeLisle and Mark Hamill voice the two antagonists, Azula and Ozai, respectively. The co-creators also lend their voices to two minor characters in the third part, "Into the Inferno".

The animated effects in the finale were directed by Jae-Myung Yoo. A particularly tricky part to animate was the climactic scene where protagonist Aang tries to overpower antagonist Ozai. Konietzko originally pitched the scene to DiMartino and Ehasz, but the three of them encountered difficulties communicating how the scene would look. They ended up drawing a fully colored storyboard to send to the animation studios. Additionally, the finale featured a significant amount of fire compared to previous episodes, and were all hand-drawn by Yoo's team. Dos Santos observed that the fire effects alone cost more than most shows spend on an entire season. Although Avatar is not considered anime because of its American origin, Tasha Robinson of the SciFi Channel observed that "Avatar blurs the line between anime and [US] domestic cartoons until it becomes irrelevant." An IGN reviewer commented that "Sozin's Comet" "had that classic anime-look that I've always loved to see when watching old anime movies. The story through the animation was perfectly done."

The finale's music was written and composed by "The Track Team", led by Jeremy Zuckerman. Unlike past episodes, a music track produced by a live orchestra was used, rather than one in MIDI format. According to Konietzko, one of the most challenging scenes to pair musically was the Agni Kai duel between Zuko and Azula. The scene's pairing of moody and melancholic music with intense action was inspired by Ghost in the Shell, and a decision was made to quiet the sound effects to let the music set the tone, inspired by Blade Runner.

Avatar: The Last Airbender borrows extensively from East Asian art to create its fictional universe. Four "bending" arts exist in the universe; they are based on different styles and variations of Chinese martial arts: Baguazhang for airbending, Hung Gar and Southern Praying Mantis for earthbending, Northern Shaolin for firebending, and tai chi for waterbending. The fight scenes were choreographed by Sifu Kisu, who performed and filmed every fight sequence with Konietzko to serve as reference for the animators. Additionally, the finale borrowed heavily from the Taoist concept of balance and order. The Avatar, an incarnation of a divine being, is supposed to maintain the world's order.

Nickelodeon originally broadcast "Sozin's Comet" from 8:00 pm to 10:00 pm EST on July 19, 2008. Just ten days later, on July 29, the "Book 3: Fire – Volume 4" DVD was released, which contained the four episodes as well as episodes 56 and 57, audio commentary from the series' co-creators, cast, and crew, and a comic book.

== Reception ==
The Lion Turtle's artistic design was praised, but the difficulty in understanding his voice is among the few criticisms directed at "Sozin's Comet".

"Sozin's Comet" received critical acclaim; Ed Liu of Toon Zone stated that it made Avatar "one of the finest animated television series ever made", Andrew Whalen of Newsweek called it a "rare accomplishment", Ed Liu of Toon Zone praised the skill of the animation directors in designing the sweeping movements of the battle sequences, as well as the slower scenes, "including one moving reconciliation and the quiet coda that ties off many of the remaining loose ends of the series". Tory Ireland Mell of IGN praised the artistic design, stating that the "whole dark tone was gorgeous to look at". Mell also praised the writing, saying that the "story moved and kept us moving right along with it from beginning to end". She gave the episode a ten out of ten "Masterful" rating. Susan Stewart, reviewing for The New York Times, praised the show's effort at philosophizing, noting that "this is complicated stuff, the reconciliation of religion and violence, and it's beautifully rendered: simple enough for Nickelodeon fans and subtle enough for their parents, with humor to puncture the pomposity inherent in the heroic genre."

Reviewers remarked on the difficulty in understanding the voice of a new character: the Lion Turtle. The Lion Turtle was designed by Bryan Konietzko and character designer Jae Woo Kim. Konietzko disliked how the Lion Turtle turned out; he felt that the art was not up to standards of the original design he had received.

The premiere of "Sozin's Comet" averaged 5.6 million viewers, 195% more viewers in its time period than Nickelodeon had received in the previous year. During the week of July 14, 2008, it ranked as the most-viewed program for the under-14 demographic. The premiere of episodes 52–61 throughout the week of "Sozin's Comet"'s release received a total of 19 million views, and Avatar earned four spots in Nielsen's list of Top 20 Cable Results for the week ending July 20, 2008. It also appeared on iTunes' top ten list of best-selling television episodes during that same week. "Sozin's Comet"'s popularity affected online media as well; "Rise of the Phoenix King", a Nick.com online game based on "Sozin's Comet", generated almost 815,000 game plays within three days. A video game loosely based on the third season, Avatar: The Last Airbender – Into the Inferno, was released on October 13, 2008.

The finale episodes were also recognized by the awards circuit. Joaquim Dos Santos won the "Best Directing in an Animated Television Production" caption in the 2008 Annie Awards for his direction in "Into the Inferno". Additionally, music editor and composer Jeremy Zuckerman and the sound editing team were nominated a Golden Reel award for "Best Sound Editing in a Television Animation" for their work in "Avatar Aang".
