= The Avatar and the Fire Lord =

- Avatar: The Last Airbender episode
- Fire Lord Sozin (left) discusses with Avatar Roku (right) his ambitions for the Fire Nation.
- Episode no.: Season 3 Episode 6
- Directed by: Ethan Spaulding
- Written by: Elizabeth Welch
- Production code: 306
- Original air dates: October 24, 2007 (United Kingdom); October 26, 2007 (United States)

Guest appearances
- Ron Perlman as Fire Lord Sozin; Andrew Caldwell as teen Roku; Sean Marquette as teen Sozin

Episode chronology
← Previous "The Beach"	Next → "The Runaway"
- Avatar: The Last Airbender season 3

"The Avatar and the Fire Lord" is the sixth episode of the third season of the American animated television series Avatar: The Last Airbender, and the 46th episode overall. The show follows Aang (Zach Tyler Eisen), the last airbender and the "Avatar", on his journey to bring balance to a war-torn world by mastering all four elements: air, water, earth, and fire. On his quest, he is joined by companions Katara (Mae Whitman), Sokka (Jack DeSena), and Toph Beifong (Jessie Flower). The season also follows Zuko (Dante Basco) as he returns to the Fire Nation only to face his conflicting feelings about his part in the war. The episode was written by Elizabeth Welch and directed by Ethan Spaulding.

The episode, written by Elizabeth Welch and directed by Ethan Spaulding, follows both Aang and Zuko as they learn about the shared past between the past Avatar Roku and a prior Fire Lord Sozin, and how Sozin's ambition and Roku's mistakes led to the beginning of the Hundred Year War. The episode was released in the United Kingdom on October 24, 2007, before airing on Nickelodeon in the United States two days later. The episode received critical acclaim and is considered one of the greatest episodes of the series.

== Plot ==
Aang is visited in a dream by Avatar Roku, who tells him to meet him on his island on the summer solstice. In the Fire Nation, Zuko wakes to find someone has left him a scroll telling him he must learn about his great-grandfather's death in order to understand his own destiny. Eventually, he discovers Fire Lord Sozin's last testament in the catacombs.

In the Spirit World, Roku shows Aang his past, where it is revealed he and Sozin were best friends. On the pair's simultaneous 16th birthdays, Roku was announced the new Avatar and was sent away to begin mastering the four elements. After completing his training, Roku returns to the Fire Nation, where Sozin welcomes him with open arms. At Roku's wedding, Sozin tells him that the Fire Nation should share its prosperity and peace with the rest of the world. A disturbed Roku rebukes him, explaining that the separation of the four nations maintains balance in the world.

Many years later, Roku learns that Sozin has invaded part of the Earth Kingdom and formed colonies. Sozin declares that Roku's first loyalty should be to the Fire Nation and attacks Roku, but the Avatar quickly defeats the Fire Lord, sparing him in the name of their past friendship. Twenty-five years later, Roku evacuates his island's residents after a massive volcanic eruption, which he unsuccessfully tries to stop. Sozin arrives and helps Roku, but when Roku is incapacitated by poisonous gas, Sozin realizes that his plans for the world are possible without his friend. Sozin leaves Roku to die by the volcano's pyroclastic flow; Aang is born at the Eastern Air Temple.

Sozin's testament ends with him stating that he used the power of Sozin's Comet to annihilate the Air Nomads, as he knew the Avatar would be born into them. Zuko visits the Fire Nation prison and questions Iroh, who he has figured out sent the scroll to him. Iroh reveals that Zuko is not only Sozin's great-grandson but Roku's as well, and that understanding their battle can better help him understand his own internal struggle. Iroh gives him a hair ornament that Sozin once gifted Roku, telling him he can redeem the sins of the Fire Nation and bring balance to the world. Exiting the Spirit World, Aang infers the message that everyone, including the Fire Nation, is capable of great good, great evil, and redemption.

== Credits ==
Main cast members Zach Tyler Eisen, Mae Whitman, Jack DeSena, Jessie Flower, Dante Basco and Dee Bradley Baker appear as the voices of Aang, Katara, Sokka, Toph Beifong, Zuko, and Appa respectively. Appearing as guests are Andrew Caldwell and James Garrett as teen and adult Avatar Roku respectively, Sean Marquette and Ron Perlman as teen and adult Fire Lord Sozin, Grey DeLisle as both Princess Azula and Ta Min, and Greg Baldwin as Zuko's uncle Iroh. This episode is the first in which Iroh has dialogue that is only provided by Baldwin after the death of Iroh's original voice actor, Mako, in July 2006.

The episode was directed by Ethan Spaulding and written by Elizabeth Welch.

== Production ==
The animation for the episode was done by JM Animation.

Creators of the show Michael Dante DiMartino and Bryan Konietzko claimed this episode was one of the most complex of the series, with by far the most background designs of any episode. The background of an iceberg in the South Pole seen during Sozin's flashback was based on a photo sound designer Benjamin Wynn took while in Antarctica. Needing to depict the submerged portion of an iceberg in the actual episode, Konietzko flipped the original image of the visible icy mass upside-down. The background behind Sozin's motivation, being that he wants to share the Fire Nation's peace and wealth with the other nations, comes from a concept from Japanese Imperialism called the Greater East Asia Co-Prosperity Sphere which the Japanese used during World War II to great criticism.

== Reception ==
The episode received critical acclaim from fans and critics and is considered one of the best episodes of the show.

Hayden Childs of The A.V. Club praised the episode, commenting: "After the personal backstory of "The Beach," the Avatar team was wise to schedule an episode that delves into the background of the series' greater arc. On rewatch, it's hard to tell how much of this was mapped out before the earlier seasons were made, but it seems an essential part of the mythology that Sozin and Roku were lifelong friends before becoming bitter enemies, an important current of subtext running throughout Aang and Zuko's every encounter." Max Nicholson of IGN gave the episode a rating of 9.5 out of 10, writing that the episode "remains one of the series' strongest episodes, as it explained how the 100 Year War began. In addition to top-notch worldbuilding, this episode also featured a smaller, emotional story about how two friends, Roku and Sozin, began a generations-long conflict spanning the entire world."
