= Aaron Ehasz =

American television writer and producer

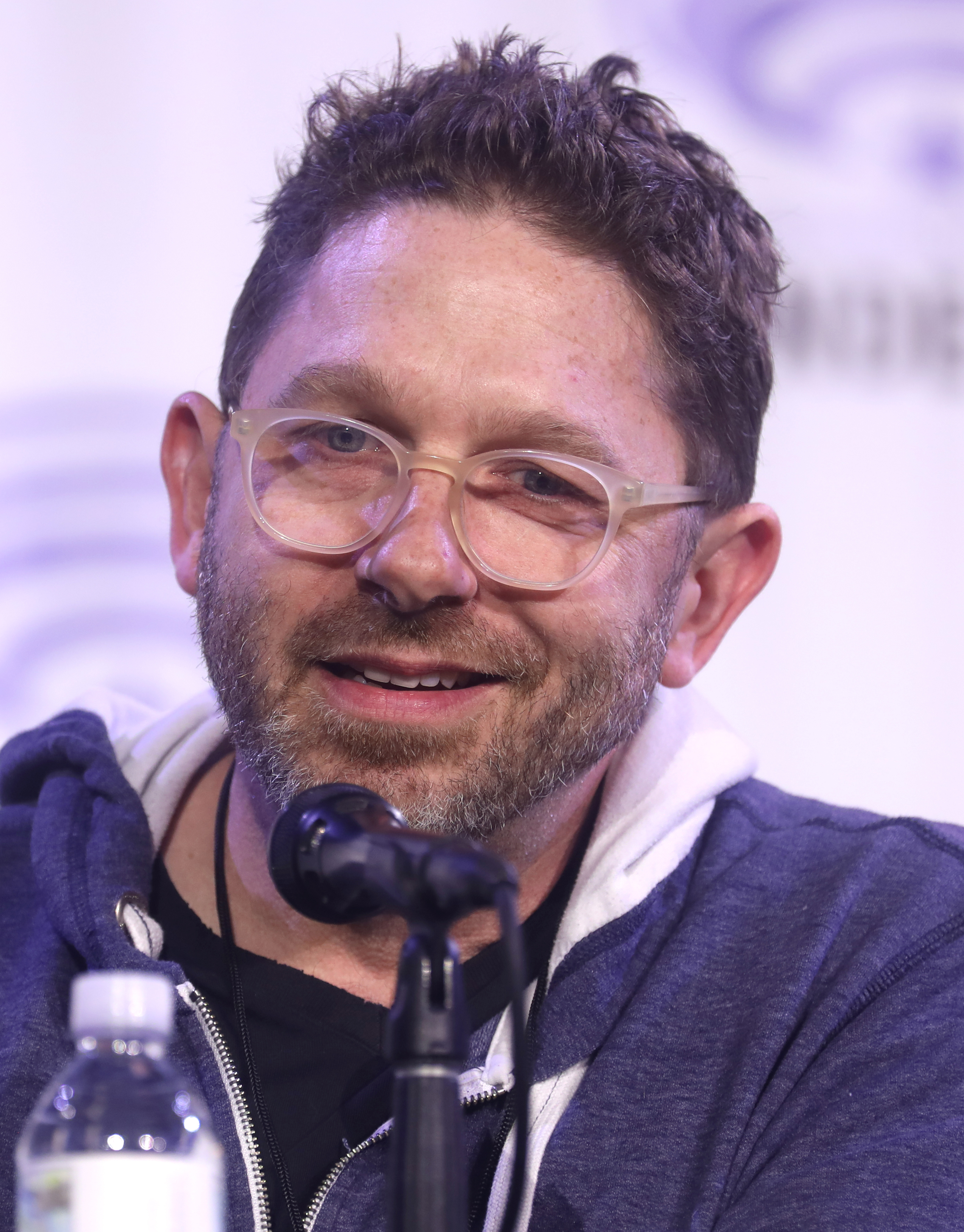
- Ehasz at the 2024 WonderCon
- Born: Aaron Gabriel Ehasz; June 16, 1973 (age 53); Maryland, United States
- Education: Harvard College; Stanford Graduate School of Business
- Occupations: Screenwriter; television producer; creative director
- Years active: 2000–present
- Known for: Avatar: The Last Airbender; The Dragon Prince
- Spouses: Melanie McGanney; Elizabeth Welch (divorced)
- Relatives: Alex Ehasz

Aaron Gabriel Ehasz (born June 16, 1973) is an American screenwriter and television producer. His body of work primarily consists of animated series, including as head writer and co-executive producer of Avatar: The Last Airbender, although he did serve as a producer on the live-action series The Mullets and Ed. He is also co-founder and CEO of Wonderstorm, and co-creator of the Netflix series The Dragon Prince. He has been involved in the video game industry, having served as creative director at Riot Games.

== Career ==
Ehasz began his writing career in the year 2000, working as a staff writer on Ed and on Mission Hill. In 2001 he took a position as story editor on Matt Groening's animated Fox series Futurama, where he worked until its cancellation in 2003. From 2005 until 2008 he served as a co-executive producer and head writer for the acclaimed Nickelodeon series Avatar: The Last Airbender. When Futurama was revived by Comedy Central in 2009, he returned to the writing staff. In the same year he also wrote an episode of the American version of Sit Down, Shut Up.

=== Wonderstorm ===
In 2017, Ehasz co-founded the multimedia studio "Wonderstorm" with video game director Justin Richmond (Uncharted). The studio's first work, the animated fantasy adventure series The Dragon Prince, was released on Netflix on September 14, 2018. The Dragon Prince garnered a reputation as "the best new Netflix show of 2018", according to Hypable writer Donya Abramo. The Mary Sue writer Caroline Cao hailed the "strong heroines" of the Dragon Prince, writing "[a]mong the show’s best assets are three multi-dimensional heroines who kick ass, have organic moments of weakness, and honestly, deserve a tribute." Notably, General Amaya, who is "a major step forward in portraying a deaf person as a badass military leader".

The Dragon Prince repeatedly appears in roundups of the best animated series on television. The PopBreak called the The Dragon Prince, "the Best Animated Series You’re Not Watching." In 2023, Forbes listed the show as one of the top 10 fantasy shows to stream. Collider ranked The Dragon Prince #4 of "The 10 Best Fantasy Shows of the 21st Century, Ranked." The article said "the entire show feels like a movie painting — every episode is nothing short of art, and reflects the passion of its cast and crew perfectly."

On July 24, 2025, at San Diego Comic-Con, The Dragon King sequel series was announced to be in early development following the conclusion of the final season of The Dragon Prince on Netflix. To independently fund development and find a distributor for the series, a crowdfunding campaign was launched on the Kickstarter platform by Wonderstorm on September 16, 2025; by September 18, it had "already earned double its original $250,000 goal, with backers pledging more than $570,000". Ehasz is set to return alongside co-creator Justin Richmond and series director Villads Spansberg.

== Awards and nominations ==
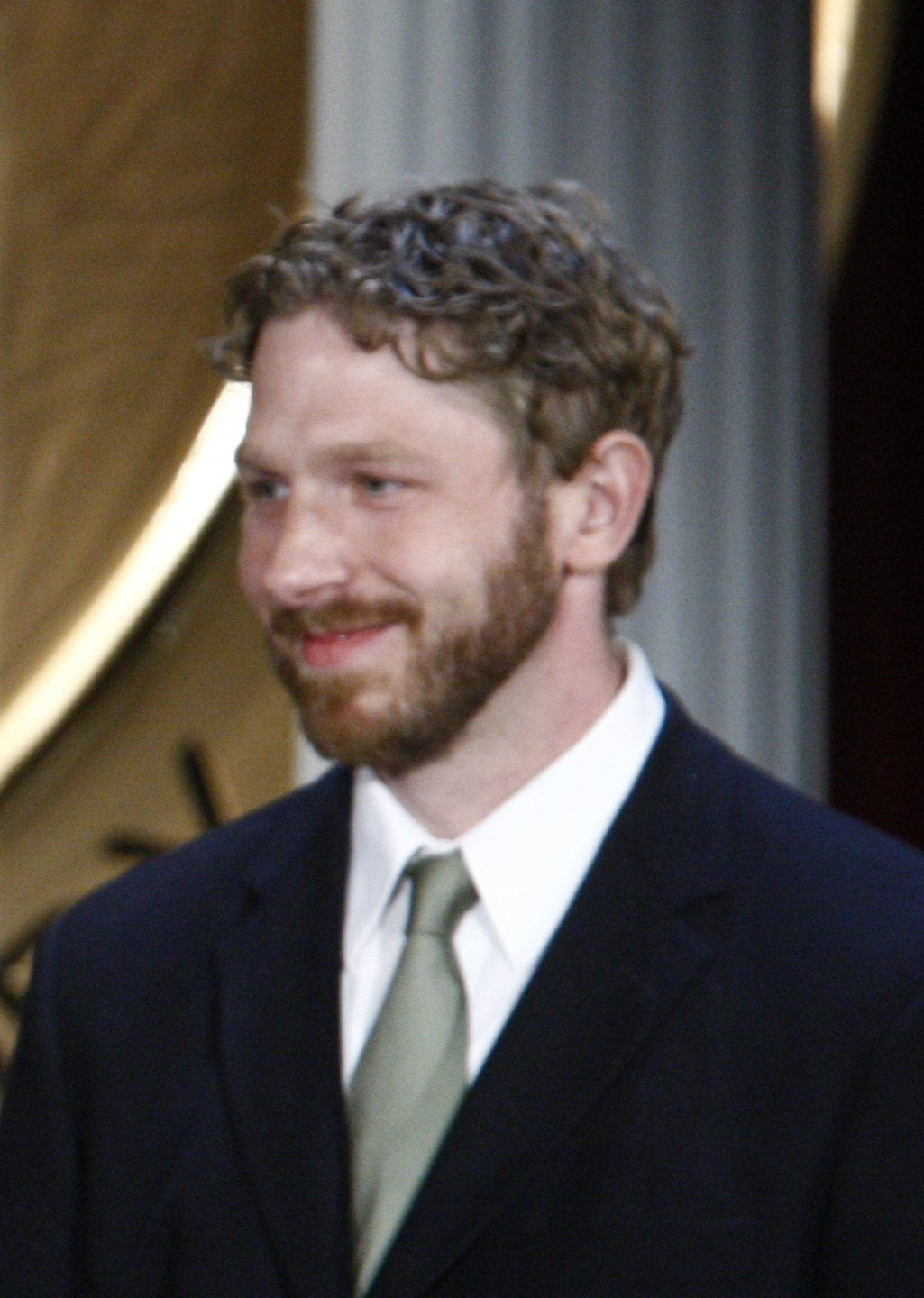
Ehasz at the 68th Annual Peabody Awards

In 2007 he was nominated for the Outstanding Animated Program (For Programming Less Than One Hour) Emmy award for his work on the second season of Avatar: The Last Airbender.

In 2008 he won a Peabody Award for his work as head writer and co-executive producer of Avatar: the Last Airbender.

In 2020 The Dragon Prince won the Daytime Emmy Award in Outstanding Children's Animated Series.

== Workplace allegations ==
According to CBR writer Meagan Damore, in November 2019, a female former employee of Ehasz alleged that "he would bring his children to work and leave them with female production staff members without asking", treating her "like his own personal assistant [...] transitioning her editorial duties to a group and shut down her ideas." Freelance writer Samantha Nelson in November 2019 reported that several women claimed "Ehasz had created an abusive environment for women [...] ignored, belittled, and gaslit his female employees".

== Filmography ==
=== Mission Hill episodes ===
- "Unemployment: Part 2" (1.09)
- "Pretty in Pink" (1.16) [Un-Produced]

=== Ed episodes ===
- "Business as Usual" (3.18)

=== Futurama episodes ===
- "Future Stock" (3.21)
- "Crimes of the Hot" (4.08)
- "Benderama" (6.15)
- "Reincarnation" (6.26)

=== Avatar: The Last Airbender episodes ===
While he is the head writer and plays a significant role in every episode of the series, his solo credits include:

- "Winter Solstice, Part 1: The Spirit World" (1.07)
- "The Storm" (1.12)
- "The Fortuneteller" (with John O'Bryan) (1.14)
- "The Siege of the North, Part 2” (1.20)
- "The Avatar State" (with Elizabeth Welch Ehasz, Tim Hedrick and John O'Bryan) (2.01)
- "Bitter Work" (2.09)
- "The Crossroads of Destiny" (2.20)
- "The Awakening" (3.01)
- "The Day of Black Sun, Part 2: The Eclipse" (3.11)
- "Sozin's Comet, Part 2: The Old Masters" (3.19)

=== The Dragon Prince episodes ===
- "Echoes of Thunder" (with Justin Richmond) (1.01)
- "What Is Done" (with Justin Richmond) (1.02)
- "Moonrise" (with Justin Richmond) (1.03)
- "An Empty Throne" (with Justin Richmond) (1.05)
- "Through the Ice" (with Justin Richmond) (1.06)
- "Cursed Caldera" (with Justin Richmond) (1.08)
- "Wonderstorm" (with Justin Richmond) (1.09)
- "A Secret and a Spark" (with Justin Richmond) (2.01)
- "Half Moon Lies" (with Justin Richmond) (2.02)
- "Breaking the Seal" (with Justin Richmond) (2.05)
- "Heart of a Titan" (with Justin Richmond) (2.06)
- "The Book of Destiny" (with Justin Richmond) (2.08)
- "Breathe" (with Justin Richmond) (2.09)
- "Sol Regem" (with Justin Richmond) (3.01)
- "The Midnight Desert" (with Justin Richmond) (3.04)
- "Heroes and Masterminds" (with Justin Richmond) (3.05)
- "Thunderfall" (with Justin Richmond) (3.06)
- "The Final Battle" (with Justin Richmond) (3.09)
- "Rebirthday" (with Justin Richmond) (4.01)
- "Fallen Stars" (with Justin Richmond) (4.02)
- "Breathtaking" (with Justin Richmond) (4.03)
- "Through the Looking Glass" (with Justin Richmond) (4.04)
- "Beneath the Surface" (with Justin Richmond) (4.07)
- "Escape from Umber Tor" (with Justin Richmond) (4.09)
- "Domina Profundis" (with Justin Richmond) (5.01)
- "The Great Bookery" (with Justin Richmond) (5.04)
- "Archmage Akiyu" (with Justin Richmond) (5.05)
- "Infantis Sanguine" (with Justin Richmond) (5.09)
- "Startouched" (with Justin Richmond) (6.01)
- "The Frozen Ship" (with Justin Richmond) (6.03)
- "Moment of Truth" (with Justin Richmond) (6.06)
- "The Red Wedding" (with Justin Richmond and Michal Schick) (6.07)
- "We All Fall Down" (with Justin Richmond) (6.08)
- "Stardust" (with Justin Richmond, Devon Giehl and Iain Hendry) (6.09)
- "Death Alive" (with Justin Richmond) (7.01)
- "Inversion" (with Justin Richmond) (7.06)
- "Nova" (with Justin Richmond) (7.09)
