= Azula =

Character in Avatar: The Last Airbender

- Avatar Legends character
- Azula in Avatar: The Last Airbender.
- First appearance: Original series: "The Storm" (2005); Live-action series: "Omashu" (2024)
- Last appearance: Original series: Azula in the Spirit Temple (2023)
- Created by: Michael Dante DiMartino; Bryan Konietzko
- Voiced by: Grey DeLisle (2006–2009); Megan Shipman (Smite); Suzie Yeung (2023–present)
- Portrayed by: Summer Bishil (2010 film); Elizabeth Yu (2024 television series)

In-universe information
- Gender: Female
- Family: Ozai (father); Ursa (mother); Zuko (older brother); Kiyi (younger maternal half-sister)
- Relatives: Iroh (paternal uncle); Izumi (fraternal niece); Azulon (paternal grandfather)
- Nationality: Fire Nation
- Bending element: Firebending
- Age: 14 (in Avatar: The Last Airbender)

Princess Azula is a fictional character and the secondary antagonist in Nickelodeon's animated television series Avatar: The Last Airbender, and is part of the Avatar: The Last Airbender world. She was created by Michael Dante DiMartino and Bryan Konietzko, and voiced by Grey DeLisle.

In the show, Azula is the crown princess of the Fire Nation and an extremely powerful firebending prodigy. Upon Fire Lord Ozai's orders, she begins a quest with her childhood friends Mai and Ty Lee to retrieve her banished brother Prince Zuko and his mentor, their uncle Iroh, while also attempting to capture Avatar Aang, considered the Fire Nation's greatest threat to victory in the war. Azula is known for being a skilled strategist and a cold, calculating manipulator. She views weakness as failure, emotion as poison. As her brother Zuko states, she "always lies." Throughout the original series and the sequel comics, she is shown to be capable of highly advanced firebending, producing hotter blue flames as well as lightning.

== Appearances ==
=== Avatar: The Last Airbender television series ===
==== Book One: Water ====
Since she is the shadowed firebender in the series' opening sequence (though she is depicted bending red fire instead of her signature blue), Azula appears at the beginning of every episode of Avatar: The Last Airbender. In the first season, she makes her first appearance in a flashback during 13-year-old Zuko's Agni Kai (firebending duel) against their father, Fire Lord Ozai. Azula smirks as Zuko's face is burned after he refuses to fight Ozai, who takes this as a sign of weakness and disrespect. The Fire Lord then banishes the permanently scarred Zuko and tasks him with finding the long-lost avatar. Azula makes a second brief appearance at the end of the first season when Ozai tasks her with repatriating Zuko and Iroh, who accompanied his nephew into exile and briefly cooperated with the series' protagonists.

==== Book Two: Earth ====
After her first attempt to capture Zuko and Iroh is accidentally thwarted by her ship's captain, Azula enlists the help of her childhood friends, Mai and Ty Lee. She eventually encounters the Avatar in Omashu and continues to pursue him, Zuko, and Iroh for the rest of the season. Following her initial failure to enter the Earth Kingdom capital Ba Sing Se using a giant drill to breach the city's strong outer wall, Azula comes in contact with the Kyoshi Warriors, esteemed fighters who, despite their lack of ability to bend any element, dress as and utilize the fighting style of Kyoshi, a past Avatar. Azula, Mai and Ty Lee then proceed to defeat and impersonate them.

Posing as Kyoshi Warriors, Azula and her friends infiltrate Ba Sing Se and befriend Earth King Kuei, who tells them about the planned invasion of the Fire Nation during an upcoming solar eclipse. Azula also comes to understand that the secret police and intelligence agency known as the Dai Li is the key to power in the capital. She is discovered as an infiltrator by Dai Li agents and brought before their imprisoned leader, Long Feng. Having in fact intentionally exposed herself, Azula lulls him into a false sense of control and accepts his offer to help stage a coup d'état against the Earth King and the loyalist Council of Five. Immediately after her seizure of power, Azula betrays Long Feng and assumes permanent leadership of the Dai Li. She also encounters Zuko in the city and convinces him to join her in order to redeem himself. During their showdown, Azula strikes Aang with a bolt of lightning while he is in the Avatar State, though he is later revived by Katara. Azula then orders the Dai Li to tear down the walls of Ba Sing Se, exposing the city to an invasion and occupation by the Fire Nation.

==== Book Three: Fire ====
In the early episodes of this season, Azula bonds with her brother and friends after their victorious return to the Fire Nation with Iroh as a prisoner. However, Azula lies to Ozai by claiming that Zuko killed Aang, as she has a hunch that Aang survived and knows that all the blame would now fall on Zuko if this were true. During the two-part episode "The Day of Black Sun," Aang assembles an elite invasion force and attacks the capital, taking advantage of a solar eclipse that renders the firebenders powerless. Having been warned by Azula, Ozai is evacuated to an underground bunker prior to the invasion. Azula and her Dai Li agents stall Aang and his friends Sokka and Toph from finding Ozai before the eclipse, which lasts only eight minutes, allowing the firebenders to retaliate with full force once they regain their bending, causing the invasion to fail. However, Zuko defects to Team Avatar after confronting Ozai during the eclipse.

Later, Azula, accompanied by Mai and Ty Lee, visits The Boiling Rock, the top security Fire Nation prison where Zuko has been captured in an attempt to infiltrate the prison and rescue the captured forces of the failed invasion. However, Zuko, Sokka, Suki (leader of the Kyoshi Warriors, who had been captured in the aftermath of their battle with Azula) and Sokka's father Hakoda manage to escape. Mai betrays Azula by aiding the group's escape, proclaiming that she is doing so out of her love for Zuko. Enraged, Azula attempts to attack Mai but is stopped by Ty Lee, who renders her incapable of bending by blocking her chi (the energy within one which one would use for bending). After having Mai and Ty Lee imprisoned for betraying her, Azula follows Zuko and Sokka's group to the Western Air Temple, where she attempts to kill them. The fight ends in a draw, with Azula narrowly escaping death after falling from one of the airships while the protagonists manage to flee.

In the series finale, Azula intends to join Ozai as he sets out to conquer the world. Instead, he leaves Azula behind in the Fire Nation and names her as his successor to the Fire Lord position, though he does so only because he declares himself king of the world, effectively rendering the title of Fire Lord meaningless. Distraught by her father's abandonment and Mai and Ty Lee's betrayal, Azula sinks into psychosis, hallucinates about her long-lost mother, and deposes nearly all of her servants and advisers in fear of similar betrayal. Before she is crowned as Fire Lord, Zuko and Katara interrupt the ceremony, whereupon Azula challenges Zuko to single combat in an Agni Kai. However, Azula's attacks, while powerful, are wild and emotional while Zuko's are calm and disciplined; and when his attacks begin to overpower her, she sends a bolt of lightning toward Katara, but ends up striking down Zuko, who attempts to redirect it. She is ultimately defeated by Katara who freezes her in a block of ice, then handcuffing her to the ground before unfreezing her, causing her to have a mental breakdown.

=== Avatar: The Last Airbender comic series ===
==== The Promise ====
Following the end of the war, Azula is admitted to a psychiatric institution, where she is closely monitored. One year after the war's end, Zuko visits Azula to request her assistance in gaining information from Ozai on the whereabouts of their long-lost mother Ursa, and Azula accepts without asking for anything in return.

==== The Search ====
When Azula visits Ozai in his prison, they are watched by Fire Lord Zuko before she asks him to leave when their father remains silent in her presence. Azula, having learned of the letters Ursa sent which falsely claims that Fire Lord Zuko is not Ozai's biological son, dodges her brother's questions while distracting him with her bending long enough to access the letters and burn them. She uses this as leverage as she convinces Zuko to allow her to join his quest to find Ursa in return for the letters' information, though she intends to use the letters' content to dethrone her brother while also murdering their mother. Her request is granted, and she becomes a protagonist by joining Team Avatar. The team eventually finds that Ursa lost her memory and assumed the identity of Noriko, starting a new family in her home village. Although Azula nearly kills Ursa, she becomes emotionally confused after her mother apologizes for not showing her enough motherly love and even more after Fire Lord Zuko reveals that he still loves his sister, despite their strained relationship. This results in a confused Azula running off into the wilderness. For several weeks, Zuko searches for Azula but fails to find her.

==== Smoke and Shadow ====
After several weeks, Azula helps her followers from the mental institution she was held in escape. They resurface under the guise of kemurikage (dark spirits). The "kemurikage" kidnap many children. After Zuko frees the children, Azula tells him that her motivation is to make him more like their father by relying on fear to maintain control. Azula then escapes and is last seen observing Zuko apologizing to his people for his recent actions before leaving. As Azula directly tells Zuko about her supposed intentions and seems to take his speech seriously, she is possibly acting as a stealth mentor by using reverse psychology on Zuko.

==== Suki, Alone ====
Shortly after Azula and her friends defeated the Kyoshi Warriors and before they infiltrated Ba Sing Se, Azula decides to separate a captured Suki from her Kyoshi Warrior sisters by sending her to the Boiling Rock prison to break her spirit by her forced isolation, and after trying to taunt her about capturing her friends as well, she sends her off with a group of prisoners.

==== Azula in the Spirit Temple ====
After an attempt from Azula and her Fire Warriors to attack a granary resulted in one of them being captured by Ty Lee and the royal guards, and in Azula being abandoned by her warriors after her lack of concern over their captured teammate. Azula finds a mysterious temple in middle of the forest where she's greeted by a supposed monk, who tries to make her comfortable by showing her illusory visions of her family and friends loving her, which led Azula to confront her feelings about being misunderstood and abandoned by her mother and friends, however despite the temple's monk, who was revealed to be a spirit in disguise wanting to help her to change and redeem herself, Azula rejects the spirit's attempts to convince her to seek redemption and attacks the temple with lightning, returning Azula to the forest, who soon finds her former Fire Warriors happy without her and having rescued their captured teammate, but despite her previous desire for revenge, Azula decides to leave them alone and walks off, seeking someone else to lead.

=== In other media ===
Azula appears in the video games Avatar: The Last Airbender – The Burning Earth and Avatar: The Last Airbender – Into the Inferno. Summer Bishil makes a cameo appearance as Azula at the end of the live-action adaptation The Last Airbender, when Fire Lord Ozai orders her to defeat the Avatar. Writer and director M. Night Shyamalan envisioned Azula as the primary antagonist of the unmade sequel to the film. Azula also appears as a playable character in the crossover fighting game Nickelodeon All-Star Brawl 2.

== Conception and creation ==
Konietzko notes that Azula's design when compared to other main characters "came together relatively quickly." Azula was originally going to wear a heavily phoenix-themed armor, though the idea was eventually abandoned. Azula's blue firebending was meant to symbolize that she was more powerful than Zuko as well as a firebending prodigy, and also to easily distinguish her attacks from his in their fights. She was initially intended to have an arranged marriage during the third season. Both creators hold the character in high regard; Konietzko believes she is "by far the most complex, interesting, and dangerous villain in the series" while DiMartino wrote that she was his favorite villain in the series.

=== Voice ===
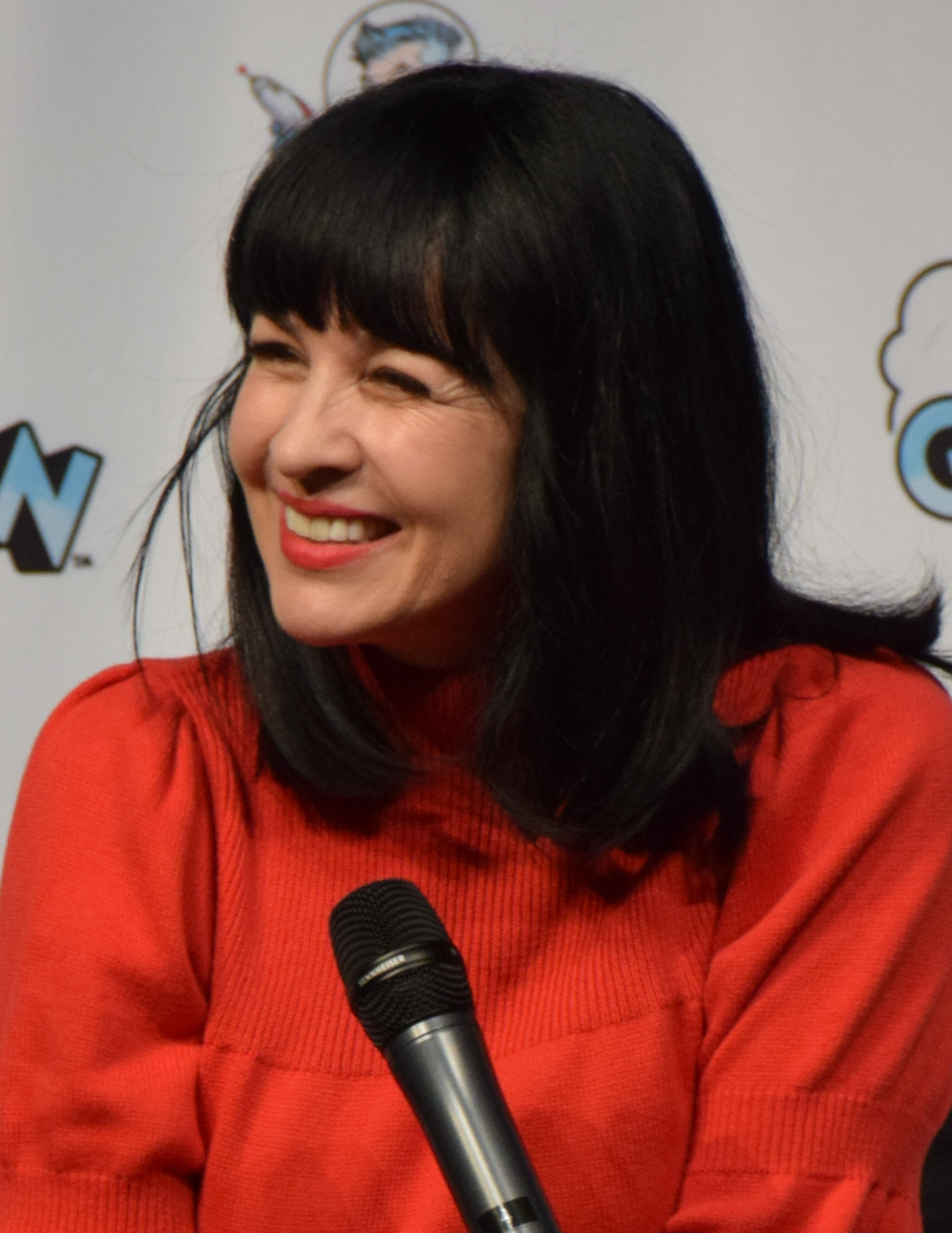
Grey DeLisle, Azula's voice actress, pictured in 2020

Grey DeLisle was the original voice actress for Azula. DeLisle recounts that she had studied her "whole life" for well-written characters like Azula who were hard to come by. Overall, DeLisle felt her life had changed positively from the role, and association with the series, relaying this to Janet Varney who would voice Korra in the sequel series.

Due to Nickelodeon's behest of authentic castings relating to the Avatar Universe in the wake of the George Floyd protests, DeLisle later stepped down from voicing Azula in 2023 as Suzie Yeung later assumed the role starting with the Generations mobile game, and both Quest for Balance and Nickelodeon All Star Brawl 2 that same year. DeLisle later clarified her decision to step down in 2025 and expressed support in having an Asian-American actress like Yeung to take over.

== Characterization ==
Although Azula's age is never stated in the series itself, the Avatar website, as well as the book The Earth Kingdom Chronicles, gives her age as fourteen. She is Fire Lord Sozin's great-granddaughter through Ozai, and Avatar Roku's through her mother, Ursa. In another flashback, it is revealed that she is named after her paternal grandfather Azulon, Ozai's father. Even as a child, Azula demonstrated her natural talents early in life, along with her tendency for malice and perfectionism. Her sharp wit and the skill she displayed towards Firebending gained her much attention and acclaim, often at Zuko's expense. Even when young, Azula suggests that her father would make a better Fire Lord than the heir apparent, her uncle Iroh, whom she dubbed "a quitter and a loser" for abandoning his siege of the Earth Kingdom's capital Ba Sing Se, which would have secured the Fire Nation's victory in the war, after the death of his son Lu Ten.

Azula was heavily influenced by her father, who favored her over Zuko due to her superior firebending abilities. However, Azula's father was a ruthless man incapable of true love. Azula was also constantly scolded by her mother due to her cruel nature. This shaped Azula's fears that she could not count on love from anyone, no matter how close they seemed. Unable to trust others, she instead began to control them using fear.

Although a skilled strategist and capable of predicting her enemies' moves, she is awkward in social situations, and later admits to jealousy of Ty Lee's ability to attract potential sweethearts during "The Beach" episode. She ends up seducing Chan with Ty Lee's advice to act dumb; however, she scares him away when she shows her true personality.

From childhood, Azula believed her mother favored Zuko and thought her monstrous, which she admitted to be true but hurt her deeply. After she was betrayed by Mai and Ty Lee, her mental state gradually collapsed, as her attacks became far more vicious and she was seemingly obsessed with killing Zuko. After her defeat, it is revealed in the graphic novel The Promise that she was admitted into a mental institution in the Fire Nation due to her deteriorated mental state. In both the series and the comics, she is shown to be disturbed by frequent hallucinations of her mother although as the comic progresses she is seen to regain her previous mental fortitude and capabilities.

Azula often acts cold-hearted towards her uncle and her brother, but she appears to show some genuine concern for Zuko in the season 2 finale and early episodes of season 3. Although she seems to care about her friends, she frequently manipulates them; her attitude is due to her negative childhood and manipulations and teaching from her father Ozai, as seen when she threatens Ty Lee into leaving the circus in Book 2. There has been only one known occurrence of Azula showing remorse by apologizing after unintentionally insulting Ty Lee.

=== Firebending ===
Azula is a skilled firebender. Firebending draws on Chinese martial arts, including changquan, Shaolin kung fu, Southern Dragon kung fu and xingyiquan. The series' creators worked with a professional martial artist to develop the show's fighting style. In combat, Azula uses firebending alongside hand-to-hand techniques, relying on her speed, agility and tactical skills.

==== Blue flames ====
Azula and her characteristic blue flames.

Azula is the only firebender who can produce blue flames, which are hotter and contain more energy (according to Planck's law) than those of other firebenders who bend normal orange flames. Her name is derived from azul, the Spanish, Galician and Portuguese word for blue. However, Azula could not produce blue fire as a young child, as shown in flashbacks. Similarly, her grandfather Azulon was never shown to wield blue flames despite his name implying otherwise. Azula can also use her firebending in previously unseen ways, such as jets of flames and whirling disks. She often firebends using only two fingers, rather than a closed fist or open hand common to other firebenders. Azula can fight for long periods of time without tiring. She is also able to generate powerful shields of swirling flames, which she uses to withstand the simultaneous combined attacks of Aang, Katara, Zuko and Toph. She is even able to charge up her fire before releasing it, as was seen during one fight with Aang.

Azula is able to propel herself, using her flames, in a manner similar to a rocket. This ability has also been extended as a means to fly for short periods of time as seen in "The Boiling Rock". She can also breathe fire, as shown when she is defeated by Katara and Zuko.

==== Lightning generation ====
"Lightning is a pure expression of firebending without aggression. It is not fueled by rage or emotion the way other firebending is. Some call lightning the cold-blooded fire. It is precise and deadly like Azula. To perform the technique requires peace of mind."

— General Iroh (Avatar: The Last Airbender)

Azula is capable of lightning generation, one of the rarest types of firebending; Iroh notes that it isn't really possible to teach lightning generation, it's just something particularly powerful firebenders are capable of.

=== Other skills ===
Azula is a skilled unarmed fighter and acrobat. In "The Avatar State," she beats Zuko in combat without resorting to firebending, and in "The Day of Black Sun," she avoids the combined forces of Aang, Toph, and Sokka for several minutes without her bending to aid her. In "Appa's Lost Days," when Suki makes a stab attack at Azula with her fan, Azula jumps horizontally and knocks Suki's sword out of her hand and onto a tree. In "The Boiling Rock," Azula is able to fall and land on her hands, holding her body up horizontally, with ease.

Azula is an expert in persuasion. She is capable of using psychological warfare, intimidation, and mistruths to con other people into obeying her. She also has the ability to lie easily without causing any change in her breathing and heart rate, making it nearly impossible to detect if she's lying, which she demonstrates in "The Day of Black Sun." She is also an accomplished strategist, as she is able to conquer Ba Sing Se, a city thought to be impenetrable while usurping the Earth King and hierarchy of the Earth Kingdom capital all in one swift move.

== Reception ==
Paste Magazine ranked Azula as the ninth best character from the Avatar universe. Hollywood.com included Azula among the "9 Villains You Should Root For", commenting that Azula "proved to be as cunning and vicious a villain as ever appeared on children's television." She was also the only female animated character to be featured in the list. ComicsAlliance ranked Azula second in the website's "Top 10 Cartoon Bad Guys" list. Ranking the character third for "The Seven Best Animated Female Villains", The Mary Sue wrote, "Gleefully evil and efficient right up until the end. You're a thorny, flaming rose, Azula, and you were fascinating to watch." Moviepilot ranked Azula first in the "Grey Griffin's 6 Greatest Villain Roles" with writer Mara Mullikin describing her "a perfectionist", while also complimenting her "tactful mind, agility, ruthlessness, manipulative nature and fire bending prowess cemented her as probably being the series' best antagonist." The same website ranked her the fifth greatest female villain, writing that Azula is "a fantastic strategist, an excellent manipulator, and perhaps the greatest firebender the world had ever seen." Website Comicbookmovie ranked her the second best animated villains.

== Family tree ==
Fire Nation Royal Family tree

Fire Lord Yosor
Generations
Keohso Clan	Fire Lord Gonryu	Saowon Clan
Generations	Huazo's; Parents	High Sage (Huazo's Uncle)
Sulan (Note: In The Shadow of Kyoshi (2020), Fire Lord Chaeryu is explained to have married Sulan, while having Huazo as a mistress. Chaeryu has a legitimate son, Zoryu, with Sulan, and an illegitimate son, Chaejin, with Huazo.)	Fire Lord Chaeryu	Huazo	Huazo's Sibling
Fire Lord Zoryu	Chaejin	Koulin
Generations
Fire Lord Taiso r. ?–58 BG	Hazei	Roku's Parents
Fire Lord Sozin r. 58 BG – 20 AG	Princess Zeisan	Yasu	Roku	Ta Min
Fire Lord Azulon r. 20–95 AG	Ilah	Jinzuk	Rina
General Iroh	Fire Lord Ozai r. 95–100 AG	Ursa (Note: In The Search (2013), Zuko's and Azula's mother Ursa is revealed to have eloped with her old boyfriend Ikem, both hiding their identities from Ozai as "Noriko" and "Noren", and together having a daughter: Kiyi.)	Noren
Prince Lu Ten	Fire Lord Zuko r. 100–167 AG	Princess Azula	Kiyi
Fire Lord Izumi r. 167 AG – present
General Iroh II	Izumi's; Daughter (Note: Izumi's daughter is an unseen character, mentioned as existing in the DVD commentary to the Legend of Korra episode "The Coronation".)

Key:
Item	Description
	Fire Lord
BG	Before Genocide (Note: The terms "BG" and "AG" stand for "Before Genocide" and "After Genocide", referring to the genocide of the Air Nomads that occurs 100 years before the start of Avatar: The Last Airbender; this event is marked as year 0.)
AG	After Genocide
