= Iroh =

Fictional character in Avatar: The Last Airbender

- Avatar Legends character
- Iroh in Avatar: The Last Airbender.
- First appearance: Original series: "The Boy in the Iceberg" (2005); The Legend of Korra: "A New Spiritual Age" (2013); Live-action series: "Aang" (2024)
- Last appearance: Original series: "Sozin's Comet, Part 4: Avatar Aang" (2008); The Legend of Korra: "The Ultimatum" (2014)
- Created by: Michael Dante DiMartino; Bryan Konietzko
- Voiced by: Mako (2005–2006); Greg Baldwin (2006–2014); Cory Yee (Smite); Artt Butler (2023–present)
- Portrayed by: Shaun Toub (2010 film); Paul Sun-Hyung Lee (2024 television series)

In-universe information
- Family: Azulon (father); Ozai (younger brother)
- Relatives: Zuko (nephew); Azula (niece)
- Nationality: Fire Nation
- Bending element: Firebending

Iroh (Chinese: 艾洛; pinyin: Àiluò) is a fictional character in Nickelodeon's animated television series Avatar: The Last Airbender, and The Legend of Korra, and is part of the Avatar: The Last Airbender world. Created by Michael Dante DiMartino and Bryan Konietzko, the character was voiced by Mako in the first two seasons and, due to Mako's death, by Greg Baldwin in the third season and the sequel series The Legend of Korra.

Iroh is a very powerful firebender—i.e., he has the power to telekinetically create and manipulate fire—and a retired general of the Fire Nation. He is the elder brother of Fire Lord Ozai, the ruler of the Fire Nation and leader of its campaign to conquer the other three nations. During the narrative of the series, he accompanies his exiled nephew Zuko on his quest to capture the series's protagonist Aang to restore the young prince's honor and birthright; Iroh acts as a mentor who seeks to help his nephew become a better person than his father.

In the episode "The Tales of Ba Sing Se", Iroh's name was written as 艾洛 (aì lùo). The episode was dedicated "In Honor of Mako", who had died some months before the episode aired.

== Character history ==
Prior to the events in The Last Airbender, Iroh was the firstborn son of Fire Lord Azulon, but Azulon was succeeded by his younger son, Ozai, following Iroh's retreat from military affairs after his son Lu Ten died in the siege of the Earth Kingdom's capital Ba Sing Se, which had held against numerous successive Fire Nation efforts at capture during the duration of the Hundred Year War. Iroh had a vision early in life that he would be the one to capture the city, but the death of his only son broke his desire to continue in the effort; having always been driven more by a sense of duty than personal ambition, Iroh abandoned the siege.

Ozai, the far more opportunistic and ambitious of the brothers, attempted to convince their father that, owing to Iroh's shameful defeat, decreased standing in the nation, and lack of heirs, Ozai ought to be made heir to the leadership of the Fire Nation. However, Azulon was incensed at this lack of respect for Iroh's position and his loss and ordered Ozai to kill his own son, Prince Zuko, as an act of atonement. Instead, Ozai's wife Princess Ursa conspired with Ozai to assassinate Azulon and seize the leadership while Iroh was in mourning and disinterested in state affairs; with the life of her son on the line, she assisted Ozai in a successful poisoning of Azulon, accepting banishment for her role. Ozai ascended to the position of Fire Lord: although the events immediately following Azulon's secret murder are never depicted in flashbacks, it seems that his death was explained as the result of natural causes and that the still-mourning Iroh had no interest in challenging his brother for control of the nation, instead acquiescing to Ozai's investiture as Fire Lord and entering a permanent semi-retirement from state affairs.

Iroh was believed to have killed off the last of the world's dragons, which along with his ability to breathe fire earned him the title "The Dragon of the West"; but in actuality he was secretly the pupil of the last two dragons, Ran and Shao, and thus learned from them to derive his firebending powers from vitality rather than from rage as most of his contemporary firebenders did; Iroh lied about killing the last of the dragons to bring an end to the Fire Nation tradition of dragon hunts. He was a high-ranking member (Grand Lotus) of the international secret society known as the Order of the White Lotus.

== Plot overview ==
When the story begins in Book One, Iroh is accompanying his nephew the banished Prince Zuko in his quest to capture the Avatar, a superhuman whose task to maintain world order makes him a threat to the Fire Nation's campaign of conquest. Having learnt of the plan of Zhao, a Fire National admiral, to kill the moon spirit to take away the Water Tribes' power of waterbending, disrupting the natural order, Iroh attacks Zhao and is named a traitor.

During Book Two, he and his nephew are now fugitives from the Fire Nation. After being gravely wounded by his niece Azula and cared for by his nephew, Iroh teaches Zuko a waterbending-inspired technique of redirecting lightning, which can be generated by an advanced form of firebending which Zuko, with his unfocused mind, has been unable to master, but which his sister and competitor to the throne, easily commands, being a firebending prodigy. Iroh eventually takes refuge in Ba Sing Se, where he and Zuko operate a tea-house. Iroh is dismayed when Azula convinces her brother to betray them and is arrested while covering Aang and his friends' escape from the conquered city.

In Book Three, held in a Fire Nation prison, Iroh fakes madness while preparing himself for the solar eclipse, during which Firebending does not work. Once the eclipse begins, Iroh escapes his cell, being a formidable opponent even without the use of firebending. In the series finale, Iroh has called the White Lotus to free Ba Sing Se from the Fire Nation—fulfilling his childhood vision, but as a liberator, not a conqueror. After the war ends, Iroh is offered the Fire Lord's throne, but he asks Zuko to be crowned instead. Soon after Zuko's coronation as Fire Lord, Iroh returns to Ba Sing Se to operate his tea shop; the final scenes of the series take place in that shop.

In the comic book sequel The Promise, Iroh offers Aang and Zuko advice on dealing with the Harmony Restoration Movement, a movement that aims to expel members of the Fire Nation ethnic group from Earth Kingdom territory; he also invents bubble tea. In the comic book The Search, Iroh becomes acting Firelord while Zuko travels to locate his mother Ursa. Bored with his new title, he uses his authority to declare a National Tea Appreciation Day.

In the sequel series The Legend of Korra, Iroh is revealed to have used a form of astral projection to become a resident of the Spirit World. In the episode "A New Spiritual Age", Iroh comes to the aid of Aang's successor as Avatar, Korra, who is trapped unprepared deep in the Spirit World. In the episode "Darkness Falls", having known them in life, Iroh encounters Aang's children Tenzin, Kya, and Bumi when they enter the Spirit World and provides them with hints as to the location of the spirit of Tenzin's daughter Jinora. Korra again encounters Iroh in "The Ultimatum", when she enters the Spirit World in search of the anarchist terrorist Zaheer. Korra explains to Iroh that she is confused and doesn't know how to deal with the threat Zaheer poses to both the newly reformed Air Nation and the world. Iroh suggests that Korra seek Zuko's counsel, as Aang once did.

Zuko's grandson is named Iroh in honor of his great-granduncle, and is a general of the United Forces, the armed services of the United Republic of Nations, a multi-ethnic nation founded by Aang and Zuko out of territories that were disputed between the Fire Nation and Earth Kingdom after the end of the Hundred Years' War.

== Personality ==
Easygoing, friendly and dryly good-humored, Iroh treats his self-imposed exile like an extended vacation. In his old age, he shows more interest in relaxation and amusement than in his nephew's pursuit of the Avatar. Despite his age, Iroh is seen flirting with various women throughout the series and has been addressed as "handsome" on multiple occasions. Nevertheless, he is a seasoned and wily strategist, a powerful Firebending master and a loving and sagely mentor to his nephew. In general, Iroh's inherent nature and the course of his life have brought him to a philosophy that embraces peacefulness, harmony, and mutual understanding rather than conflict. However, when he is personally threatened or observes injustice and violence against the innocent, he is capable of becoming a fierce and intimidating adversary.

Contrary to the direction in which his nation has moved in the years since his grandfather Sozin set it on a mission of conquest, Iroh would rather see the four nations live in mutual peace; though he has been unwilling to plunge his nation into civil war by asserting his claim to the position of Firelord (a station he does not want), it becomes increasingly clear that he views his nephew as possessing the potential to lead the nation down a better path, and when the time comes, he encourages Zuko to intercede to prevent the investiture of his sister, the callous and unstable Azula, as the next Firelord. In "Tales of Ba Sing Se", it is suggested that some of his perpetual optimism and generosity are a form of post-traumatic growth resulting from the death of his son Lu Ten. This can be seen in his song "Leaves from the Vine", which he sings on the anniversary of Lu Ten's birthday.

Iroh is particularly fond of food, good tea, the strategy game Pai Sho, and pleasant music. He later displays skill at playing the pipa and other musical instruments. Most likely because of his love of tea, he is an amateur botanist, though his misinterpretation of some plant characteristics leads him to accidentally poison himself. His character is best shown in his relationship with his nephew, Zuko, upon whom he imposes introspection.

== Firebending and special skills ==
Iroh is a retired general with a lifetime of combat experience and a reputation of honor, loyalty and integrity. Iroh is highly skilled in firebending; the Avatar show creators based the forms of this fictional form of combat upon the real-life Chinese martial arts techniques of changquan, Shaolin kung fu, Southern Dragon kung fu and xingyiquan. Iroh also taught Zuko how to redirect lightning, a technique he discovered by studying waterbending. He also had the ability to generate lightning, a skill he shared with Ozai and Azula, and his signature firebending move was breathing fire like a dragon.

== Reception ==
Iroh was a well-received character in the series. He was seen as Zuko's foil with him being the elderly, mellow and wise individual and Zuko being the young abrasive naïve prince. Iroh and Zuko's relationship was praised for its authenticity and humor. Iroh is described as a "mystical buddha" who served as Zuko's moral compass. In some circles, Iroh was viewed as an inspirational character, with his quotes on the series described as encouraging. While many of the series' other major characters were maturing throughout the course of the series, Iroh was already a "changed man" who already suffered tremendous loss and "matured" through that loss. Iroh's vignette in the episode "The Tales of Ba Sing Se", was described as an "emotional gut-punch" by reviewer Rebecca Pahle. Reviewer Hayden Childs characterized Iroh's vignette as "a lovely piece of storytelling" and praised Mako's "amazing performance" in the character's short story. Reviewer Matt London admitted to being "reduced to tears" while watching Iroh's vignette. He praised Mako's performance in voicing the character, while characterizing Ozai stealing Iroh's birthright as the next Fire Lord as "almost Shakespearean". Reviewer Keval Shah termed the scene where Iroh sacrifices himself to allow Aang and Katara to escape Azula in the season two finale, "The Crossroads of Destiny", as "emotional". Shah praised the "superb development" of the character.

Iroh's appearances in the Legend of Korra series were also well received. Iroh's introduction into the series was observed as a plot device to help Korra, who at that point was a somewhat unpopular character among fans and critics alike, become a more likeable protagonist.

== Appearance in other media ==
Shaun Toub plays Iroh in the feature film The Last Airbender. This version of the character is not as comedic as his cartoon counterpart, but retains his role as mentor to Zuko. Unlike other Firebenders in the movie, who require a source of fire to bend, Iroh can generate fire merely by using his chi.

Iroh is portrayed by Paul Sun-Hyung Lee in the live-action remake of Avatar: The Last Airbender produced by Netflix.

Iroh also appears in the video game Avatar: The Last Airbender – The Burning Earth, as a character in both the main story, and in multiplayer mode. In the video game The Legend of Korra, he acts as the shopkeeper at the in-game Spirit Shop. Iroh appears as a playable character in Nickelodeon All-Star Brawl 2 via downloadable content.

== Family tree ==
Fire Nation Royal Family tree

Fire Lord Yosor
Generations
Keohso Clan	Fire Lord Gonryu	Saowon Clan
Generations	Huazo's; Parents	High Sage (Huazo's Uncle)
Sulan (Note: In The Shadow of Kyoshi (2020), Fire Lord Chaeryu is explained to have married Sulan, while having Huazo as a mistress. Chaeryu has a legitimate son, Zoryu, with Sulan, and an illegitimate son, Chaejin, with Huazo.)	Fire Lord Chaeryu	Huazo	Huazo's Sibling
Fire Lord Zoryu	Chaejin	Koulin
Generations
Fire Lord Taiso r. ?–58 BG	Hazei	Roku's Parents
Fire Lord Sozin r. 58 BG – 20 AG	Princess Zeisan	Yasu	Roku	Ta Min
Fire Lord Azulon r. 20–95 AG	Ilah	Jinzuk	Rina
General Iroh	Fire Lord Ozai r. 95–100 AG	Ursa (Note: In The Search (2013), Zuko's and Azula's mother Ursa is revealed to have eloped with her old boyfriend Ikem, both hiding their identities from Ozai as "Noriko" and "Noren", and together having a daughter: Kiyi.)	Noren
Prince Lu Ten	Fire Lord Zuko r. 100–167 AG	Princess Azula	Kiyi
Fire Lord Izumi r. 167 AG – present
General Iroh II	Izumi's; Daughter (Note: Izumi's daughter is an unseen character, mentioned as existing in the DVD commentary to the Legend of Korra episode "The Coronation".)

Key:
Item	Description
	Fire Lord
BG	Before Genocide (Note: The terms "BG" and "AG" stand for "Before Genocide" and "After Genocide", referring to the genocide of the Air Nomads that occurs 100 years before the start of Avatar: The Last Airbender; this event is marked as year 0.)
AG	After Genocide
