= Giancarlo Volpe =

American animator

- Born: Italy
- Occupations: Animator, writer, storyboard artist, director, comic creator, producer
- Years active: 1997–present
- Notable work: Avatar: The Last Airbender; King of the Hill; Star vs. the Forces of Evil; Star Wars: The Clone Wars; Green Lantern: The Animated Series; Mike Tyson Mysteries; The Dragon Prince
- Height: 148.21 cm (4 ft 10.35 in)

Giancarlo Volpe is an Italian-born American animator, director, producer and comic creator.

== Personal life ==
Graduating from the School of Visual Arts in 1997, Volpe began his career at Humongous Entertainment, animating on the children's computer games Pajama Sam 2: Thunder and Lightning Aren't so Frightening and Putt-Putt Enters the Race. In 1998, he began working at Film Roman to work on the Fox series King of the Hill, where he was a character layout artist and assistant director.

== Animator ==
In 2005, Volpe went on to direct 19 episodes of the Nickelodeon series Avatar: The Last Airbender. He won an Annie award for the second season episode "The Drill".

In 2008, Volpe moved to Lucasfilm Animation as an episodic director on Star Wars: The Clone Wars where he worked directly with famed filmmaker George Lucas.

Volpe also produced the CG television show Green Lantern: The Animated Series, working with animation producer Bruce Timm. The series ran for 26 episodes and had a devout following, where its loyal fan base was dubbed “Fanterns”.

In January 2014, Warner Bros. Animation released JLA Adventures: Trapped in Time, which was produced and directed by Volpe. JLAATIT is a 52-minute direct-to-video movie featuring the Justice League and received critical praise for its fun factor and kid friendly tone.

In 2014, Volpe worked for Riot Games, where he helped create animated content based on wildly popular MOBA game League of Legends. The content was designed to expand upon the very fast world and character base of the game.

On February 14, 2015, Volpe launched his webcomic God of Love via his Tumblr. The comic is 100% creator owned and features two elven lovers on the run when the goddess of love is replaced by an evil demon.

Volpe directed, wrote, and storyboarded for the Disney Channel animated series Star vs. the Forces of Evil from 2015 to 2017.

Volpe also helped to develop and direct the pilot for Mike Tyson Mysteries.

== Filmography ==
Title	Year	Director	Writer	Producer	Storyboard artist	Other credits
King of the Hill	1999–2005	No	No	No	Yes	character layout artist / assistant director
Avatar: The Last Airbender	2005–2008	Yes	Yes	No	Yes	character designer / assistant director
Star Wars: The Clone Wars	2009–2011	Yes	No	No	Yes	
Green Lantern: The Animated Series	2011–2013	No	No	Yes	No	
JLA Adventures: Trapped in Time	2014	Yes	No	Yes	No	
Mike Tyson Mysteries	2014–2020	No	Developer	No	No	
Star vs. the Forces of Evil	2016–2017	Yes	Yes	No	Yes	temp dialogue recordist
The Dragon Prince	2018–2019	Yes	No	Executive	No	
The Boys Presents: Diabolical	2022	Supervising	No	No	No	loop group
Young Justice	2022	No	Yes	No	No	
Rise of the Teenage Mutant Ninja Turtles	2022	No	No	No	Additional	
