= The Secret of the Fire Nation =

- Avatar: The Last Airbender episodes
- The Fire Nation's drill approaching the walls of Ba Sing Se
- Episode nos.: Season 2 Episodes 12/13
- Directed by: Ethan Spaulding (Part One); Ethan Spaulding (Part One)
- Written by: Michael Dante DiMartino; Joshua Hamilton (Part One); Bryan Konietzko (Part Two)
- Production code: 212/213
- Original air date: September 15, 2006

Guest appearances
- Brian Tochi as Than; Kim Mai Guest as Ying; Karen Maruyama as bureaucrat; Barry Dennen as General Sung; Kristoffer Tabori as War Minister Qin

Episode chronology
← Previous "The Desert"	Next → "City of Walls and Secrets"
- Avatar: The Last Airbender (season 2)

"The Secret of the Fire Nation" is the twelfth and thirteenth episodes of the second season of the American animated television series Avatar: The Last Airbender, also titled "The Serpent's Pass" and "The Drill" respectively, and the 32nd and the 33rd episode overall. The show follows Aang (Zach Tyler Eisen), the last airbender and the “Avatar”, on his journey to bring balance to a war-torn world by mastering all four elements: air, water, earth, and fire. On his quest, he is joined by companions Katara (Mae Whitman), Sokka (Jack DeSena), and Toph Beifong (Jessie Flower), and hunted down by Fire Nation prince Zuko (Dante Basco) and princess Azula (Grey DeLisle). In other regions and on the Book Two DVDs, the two parter was collectively named "Journey to Ba Sing Se". "The Serpent's Pass" was written by Joshua Hamilton and Michael Dante DiMartino, and directed by Ethan Spaulding, while "The Drill" was written by DiMartino and Bryan Konietzko, and directed by Giancarlo Volpe.

The first part, written by series co-creator Michael Dante DiMartino and Joshua Hamilton, and directed by Ethan Spaulding, follows Aang and his friends leading a family, including a pregnant woman, through the dangerous "Serpent's Pass" while on their way to the Earth Kingdom capital city Ba Sing Se, while Zuko joins a group of freedom fighters aboard a ship also heading to the city. The second part, written by Bryan Konietzko and directed by Giancarlo Volpe, follows Aang and his friends as they try to stop a giant drill, led by Azula, from breaking through Ba Sing Se's inner wall. The two-part episode originally premiered in select movie theatres on September 9, 2006, before airing on Nickelodeon six days later. The episodes received positive reviews, and was watched by 4.4 million viewers live.

== Plot ==
=== Part 1: "The Serpent's Pass" ===
Aang and his friends are relaxing at the base of a waterfall. As the group is relaxing, Sokka promises the quickest way to get to Ba Sing Se is to go through the Serpent's Pass. The group then encounter a group of three Earth Kingdom refugees - Than, his pregnant wife Ying, and his sister - who warn them not to travel down the Serpent's Pass as it is considered deadly. Instead, Aang's group goes to Full Moon Bay to take a ferry designed for refugees to the city instead. The ticketmaster doesn't allow them to board at first without passports, but Toph bribes her with her Beifong family document. Just as Sokka starts celebrating, he reunites with Suki who he initially doesn't recognize due to her being without her makeup. When Suki asks why they can't just fly to Ba Sing Se on Appa, Aang tells her of Appa's kidnapping. (Note: As depicted in "The Library") Than and Ying later find Aang and reveal a thief stole their tickets, leading Aang to make the decision to lead them through the Serpent's Pass.

Meanwhile, Zuko and Iroh meet a band of freedom fighters on the ferry to Ba Sing Se, consisting of Jet, Smellerbee and Longshot. (Note: Last seen in "Jet") Jet convinces Zuko to raid the crew's quarters and 'liberate' the food the captain is keeping from the passengers. Zuko agrees and helps. Later that night, Jet offers Zuko a permanent spot on the Freedom Fighters, but Zuko refuses as he wants to start a new life with Iroh. Aang and his friends alongside Than, his sister, Ying, and Suki, begin to cross the Serpent's Pass. When a rock begins to fall on Suki, Sokka pushes her out of the way and is only saved by Toph's earthbending. Later that night, Suki confronts Sokka reminding him she does not need any protection. Sokka tells her that he failed to save someone at the Northern Water Tribe and that it still haunts him, (Note: He is referring to losing Princess Yue, a romantic interest of his, in "The Siege of the North") and he later refuses a kiss from Suki because of this. Katara also approaches Aang and lets him know it is all right to miss Appa. She asks why he is keeping his emotions in check and Aang replies that he did not like how his anger changed him in the desert. (Note: As depicted when Aang became violent in the previous episode "The Desert") Katara encourages Aang to not give up on hope and attempts to give him a hug, but he simply bows and thanks her for her concern.

The next day, the group find a gap in the Serpent's Pass forcing Katara to split the water and create a path for them to travel on. When a dangerous serpent attack them, Aang and Katara go to defeat it while the rest of the group cross the river on an ice bridge Katara has created. Toph however refuses to cross as she would not be able to see where she is going but is forced to as the battle between Aang and Katara and the serpent grows intense. Just as she reaches the halfway point, the serpent destroys the ice bridge leading to Toph falling in water and calling for Sokka to help her. Suki dives in, swims and rescues her from drowning before Toph, under the assumption Sokka has saved her, kisses her on the cheek. Embarrassed when she realizes it's not Sokka, she jokingly asks Suki to let her drown. Aang and Katara create a large maelstrom, spinning the serpent, who eventually gets knocked out as he hits one of the walls. As the group has finally crossed the pass, Ying goes into labor. Katara helps deliver the baby, who Than and Ying name Hope inspired by one of Aang's speeches. Aang thanks Katara for her support and realizes he has to remember the love he feels for Appa and for her to carry on his mission. Suki tries to apologise for last night, but Sokka kisses her confessing his love for her. Aang flies ahead and glides to the top of the Ba Sing Se wall where he sees a Fire Nation drill approaching.

=== Part 2: "The Drill" ===
Aang returns to his friends and takes them to the wall where he shows them the drill, revealed to be controlled by Fire Nation Princess Azula and her two friends Mai and Ty Lee. Aang meets with General Sung who insists the Avatar's help is unneeded as he has already sent a group of earthbenders - known as the "Terra Team" - to stop the drill. The nickname gets Sokka thinking about what nickname their group should have. The Terra Team are quickly defeated by Ty Lee's chi-blocking leading to Aang and his friends deciding to take action themselves. Meanwhile, Zuko and Iroh gain tickets from the ticketmaster to enter Ba Sing Se. While waiting for the train to pick them up, Iroh orders tea only to find it is cold. Once again, Jet tries to get Zuko to join the Freedom Fighters but Zuko declines. Jet notices that Iroh's tea is now hot and concludes Iroh and Zuko are firebenders.

Aang, Katara, and Sokka sneak into the drill where they steal the schematics and Sokka comes up with a plan to slice the braces that connect the inner mechanism and the outer shell, causing the drill to collapse. However, halfway through the first brace, Aang and Katara begin to grow fatigued of slicing the brace through waterbending. Aang remembers something Toph taught him about how they only need to slice the braces halfway and then deliver a final blow enough to shear the braces. While Katara and Sokka try to escape the drill, Aang heads to the surface with Katara's water pouch and tries to create a place where the final blow can be delivered. However, Azula follows him outside and the two engage in a battle. Meanwhile, Katara and Sokka are chased by Ty Lee into a drainage pipe consisting of water and rock. They are flushed out of the drill and Katara and Toph, who was waiting outside, use their bending to trap the drainage in the drill, increasing the pressure.

As Azula is about to kill Aang, Sung sends a barrage of boulders flying towards the surface of the drill which just breaks through the outer wall. Aang uses one of these boulders to craft a spike that can be used to create the final blow. Aang uses his air scooter to climb up the wall, before running extremely fast down the wall and hitting the spike, causing the drill's collapse. The Fire Nation retreats while Sokka congratulates the group on their work brainstorming potential group names such as "Boomer-Aang", "the Aang Gang", or the "Fearsome Foursome". On the train entering Ba Sing Se, Iroh tickles an infant, revealed to be Hope.

== Credits ==
Main cast members Zach Tyler Eisen, Mae Whitman, Jack DeSena, Jessie Flower, Dante Basco and Dee Bradley Baker appear in both episodes as the voices of Aang, Katara, Sokka, Toph Beifong, Zuko, and Momo respectively. Appearing as guest stars in "The Serpent's Pass" are Mako as Zuko's uncle Iroh, Crawford Wilson as Freedom Fighter Jet, Nika Futterman as Smellerbee, Jennie Kwan as Suki, Brian Tochi as Tran, Kim Mai Guest as Ying, Karen Maruyama as bureaucrat, and James Sie as the cabbage merchant in his penultimate appearance in the show. (Note: His last will be in "The Tales of Ba Sing Se") Appearing as guest stars in "The Drill" are Mako, Grey DeLisle as Fire Nation princess Azula, Cricket Leigh as Mai, Olivia Hack as Ty Lee, Wilson, Futterman, Barry Dennen as General Sung, Kristoffer Tabori as a Fire Nation war minister, and Guest.

"The Serpent's Pass" was directed by Ethan Spaulding and written by Joshua Hamilton and Michael Dante DiMartino. "The Drill" was directed by Giancarlo Volpe and written by DiMartino and Bryan Konietzko.

== Production ==
The animation for the episodes were done by JM Animation for the first part and DR Movie for the second part.

Than and Ying make their second appearance in the show after having non-speaking roles in "Zuko Alone", while Suki also makes her second appearance after she first appeared in "The Warriors of Kyoshi" and was mentioned in "Avatar Day". According to the staff, Suki was originally intended to be a one-time character but was reintroduced in this episode as she was popular with both fans and the crew. The episode contains many references to other pieces of text, with the words carved onto the gate of the Serpent's Pass being a reference to Dante's Divine Comedy, and Katara parting the waters similar to Moses doing so in the Book of Exodus.

== Reception ==
The episode was watched by 4.4 million viewers when it premiered on Nickelodeon on September 15, 2006, the most-viewed episode of the show until the four-part finale episode.

Max Nicholson of IGN gave "The Serpent's Pass" a rating of 8 out of 10, writing "Of course, the thing that made this episode so great, at least for the Gaang, was that each member of the group got their moment(s) to shine," and gave "The Drill" a 9 out of 10 praising the "near-perfect balance between action, humor and character development." Hayden Childs of The A.V. Club described the episodes as "second-tier for Avatar" stating that "while neither was a bad episode, they lack the grand vision of the great episodes. They were quite a decent way to kick off the second half of this season, with plenty of action and plot mechanics that will not come into fruition for many episodes yet to come."

In 2020, The Harvard Crimson ranked "The Serpent's Pass" and "The Drill" as the 24th and the 17th best episodes of the series respectively praising both Azula's scare factor as a villain and the character moments regarding Aang, and Sokka and Suki.

For his work on "The Drill", Giancarlo Volpe was nominated and won the "Best Directing in an Animated Television Production" award at the 34th Annie Awards.
