= The Crossroads of Destiny =

Finale of the second season of Avatar: The Last Airbender

- Avatar: The Last Airbender episode
- The climax of the episode sees the apparent death of main character Aang by a lightning strike fired by Princess Azula. The moment is considered one of the most shocking moments in the series.
- Episode no.: Season 2 Episode 20
- Directed by: Michael Dante DiMartino
- Written by: Aaron Ehasz
- Production code: 220
- Original air date: December 1, 2006

Guest appearances
- Phil LaMarr as the Earth King; Clancy Brown as Long Feng; Brian George as Guru Pathik

Episode chronology
← Previous "The Guru"	Next → "The Awakening"
- Avatar: The Last Airbender season 2

"The Crossroads of Destiny" is the twentieth and final episode of the second season of the American animated television series Avatar: The Last Airbender, and the 40th episode overall. The show follows Aang (Zach Tyler Eisen), the last airbender and the “Avatar”, on his journey to bring balance to a war-torn world by mastering all four elements: air, water, earth, and fire. On his quest, he is joined by companions Katara (Mae Whitman), Sokka (Jack DeSena), and Toph Beifong (Jessie Flower), and hunted down by Fire Nation prince Zuko (Dante Basco) and princess Azula (Grey DeLisle). The episode was written by head writer Aaron Ehasz and directed by co-creator Michael Dante DiMartino.

The episode, written by Aaron Ehasz and directed by series co-creator Michael Dante DiMartino, follows Aang returning to the city of Ba Sing Se, which Azula has now taken over, to rescue Katara. It also follows Zuko having to make the choice between joining Azula or turning away from the Fire Nation. The episode premiered on Nickelodeon on December 1, 2006, immediately after the previous episode, "The Guru". It received universal acclaim for its visuals, fight choreography, emotional moments, pacing, storytelling, and dark tone compared to the rest of the series. It is named by many as one of the best episodes of the show, and is considered "The Empire Strikes Back of the series" in regards to its cliffhanger ending.

== Plot ==
Sokka and Aang hurry back to Ba Sing Se on Appa to rescue Katara who has been captured by Azula, Mai, and Ty Lee. (Note: As depicted in the previous episode "The Guru".) They pick up Toph along the way who is also travelling to the city. While riding on Appa, Aang lies to Sokka and Toph claiming he has mastered the Avatar State, when in actuality he was told by Guru Pathik that until he opens his final chakra he will not be able to enter the Avatar State at all. In the city, Zuko and Iroh, under the belief they have been invited to serve the Earth King tea, are approached by Azula who aims to capture them. Iroh manages to hold them off for them to escape, but Zuko turns back looking to fight Azula himself. Instead, he is captured and thrown underground into an underground cave called the Crystal Catacombs where he meets Katara.

Aang, Sokka, and Toph return to their apartment to find it is empty and Katara is nowhere to be found. Iroh arrives asking for help with finding Zuko, and Aang agrees. After Toph interrogates a Dai Li agent, he gives up the location of Zuko and Katara and the group begin to plan a rescue effort. Sokka and Toph go to rescue the Earth King Kuei, but Azula holds him hostage after the two find out Mai and Ty Lee are not Kyoshi Warriors. After Sokka and Toph are arrested, Long Feng, who has been freed from prison, arrives and orders to arrest Azula. However, Azula explains that the Dai Li serve her now as they recognize the "divine right to rule", something a person is born with and cannot achieve through conniving and trickery as Long Feng did. Long Feng surrenders and bows to Azula as she takes the Earth King's throne.

Aang and Iroh walk through the underground tunnels to find Katara and Zuko. Aang lets him know about how he turned down cosmic energy over his love for Katara, to which Iroh gives him the advice that "sometimes life is like this dark tunnel... but if you just come moving forward, you will come to a better place" just as the two enter the Crystal Catacombs. Katara expresses her hatred towards Zuko, claiming that when she thinks of the Fire Nation his face appears and that he doesn't know what the war cost her, telling him she lost her mother. Zuko shares that his mother was lost to the Fire Nation too (Note: As depicted in the episode "Zuko Alone".) and the two bond. Katara tells Zuko she could heal his scar using the water she got from the Spirit Oasis, which has special healing properties. (Note: As depicted in the episode "The Avatar State".) However, Aang and Iroh arrive before she can do so. While Aang and Katara escape, Iroh tries convincing Zuko to look inwards and choose good, claiming this is his "Crossroads of Destiny." Azula arrives and tempts Zuko into helping her, claiming if he does so he can reclaim his honor and their father, Ozai will accept him back in the Fire Nation, before going after Aang and Katara leaving him to choose.

Azula engages Aang and Katara in a fight in the Crystal Catacombs, while Sokka and Toph escape from their cell with the Earth King and they later liberate Bosco, the Earth King's pet bear, from Mai and Ty Lee. Zuko joins Azula in the fight in the Catacombs, betraying Katara. As the fight becomes too intense due to the Dai Li agents joining to fight against Aang and Katara, Aang creates a hut out of the crystals and attempts to unlock his final chakra. He rises into the air, but before he can let go of Katara and gain control of the Avatar State, Azula shoots Aang down with a lightning bolt to the back, killing him and wiping the Avatar Spirit from the plane of existence. Consequently, Aang fails to clear the last chakra and master the Avatar State, leaving his attachment to Katara intact. Katara manages to catch Aang before he hits the ground and Iroh fends off the Dai Li agents while Katara escapes with Aang's corpse. Iroh is taken into custody while Katara uses the water from the Spirit Oasis to bring back Aang to life. As Azula reassures a distraught Zuko that he has gained his own honor by helping her and betraying his uncle, Katara, Sokka, Toph, and Kuei look on Ba Sing Se as the latter sadly states that "the Earth Kingdom has fallen."

== Credits ==
Main cast members Zach Tyler Eisen, Mae Whitman, Jack DeSena, Jessie Flower, Dante Basco and Dee Bradley Baker appear as the voices of Aang, Katara, Sokka, Toph Beifong, Zuko, and Appa respectively. Appearing as guests are Mako as Zuko's uncle Iroh, Phil LaMarr as the Earth King, Clancy Brown as the villainous Long Feng, Grey DeLisle as Fire Nation princess and Zuko's sister Azula, Cricket Leigh as Azula's knife-throwing friend Mai, Olivia Hack as Azula's acrobatic friend Ty Lee, and Brian George as Guru Pathik, who only appears through archive recordings from the previous episode. The episode marks the final episode where Iroh is voiced by Mako due to his death in July 2006. He is replaced in the third season by Greg Baldwin, who also voiced the character for brief pieces of dialogue throughout episodes of the second season, including this episode.

The episode was directed by co-creator Michael Dante DiMartino and written by head writer Aaron Ehasz.

== Production ==
The animation for the episode was done by JM Animation.

According to head writer Aaron Ehasz, Zuko was originally supposed to join Team Avatar in this episode. However, as they neared the end of writing it, Ehasz decided against it, claiming that "he still wasn't ready."

The episode, as the season finale, looked to tie up many plot points established earlier in the season. The biggest one was Zuko's choice between joining Azula or doing good with Iroh, with the title of the episode being taken from Iroh's quote about how Zuko has reached his "Crossroads of Destiny".

The way Katara holds Aang's lifeless body after he is struck down by Azula's lightning closely resembles Michelangelo's Pietà, a famous sculpture of the Virgin Mary holding her dead son, Jesus Christ, after he is brought down from the cross. Aang's fatal injury and subsequent revival as the savior of the world mirror the death and resurrection of Jesus Christ in Christianity, while Katara's role as a mother figure to Aang is emphasized through her parallel to the Virgin Mary.

== Reception ==
The episode received universal acclaim from fans and critics and is considered one of the best episodes of the show. It was watched by 4.4 million viewers alongside the previous episode "The Guru".

Hayden Childs of The A.V. Club praised the episode, commenting:

"As we head into the final moments of season two, it becomes apparent that this season was about defeat. In season one, almost every episode involved the Aang Gang overcoming adversity through their own skill or, at the very least, blind luck. In season two, Aang has failed to tell Katara his feelings, failed to free Bumi, failed to defeat Azula, lost Appa for seven out of 20 episodes, failed to defeat the Dai Li, failed to protect the Earth King, failed to secure the Earth Kingdom’s armies for their planned invasion of the Fire Nation, failed to master his chakras, and, most importantly, failed to draw breath for a good long number of minutes."

Max Nicholson of IGN gave the episode a rating of 9.5 out of 10, writing that the episode was "equal parts action-packed and emotional, from the Crystal Catacombs showdown to Zuko's inner conflict" and that it "delivered on almost every single level, ending on a suitably dark note."

=== Comparisons to The Empire Strikes Back ===
The episode and the previous, The Guru, have been often compared to the 1980 film The Empire Strikes Back in how it presents an ending to the second part of a trilogy where the heroes lose. Aang (Luke) leaves Pathik (Yoda) after seeing a vision of Katara (Leia) in trouble despite Pathik telling him that his Avatar (Jedi) training must be finished before he leaves. Aang (Luke) makes the wrong choice to abandon his training with Pathik (Yoda) to go save Katara (Leia), and is defeated. Similar to how Luke has his hand severed, Aang is left with lightning scars. Both Aang and Luke suffer from the psychological impacts of their failures in the third installments of their respective series. (Note: Book Two: Earth is the second part of the overall show which is presented in a trilogy of seasons, and The Empire Strikes Back is the second part of the original Star Wars trilogy.)

Jeremy from The Avocado writes:

"At the end of The Empire Strikes back we learn that Darth Vader is Luke Skywalker’s father. Arguably the defining narrative twist of the last forty years. A moment that undercuts all expectations for a flash of total shock and defeat for our heroes. What’s amazing about “The Crossroads of Destiny” is that Avatar is able to replicate the feeling of, “I am your father,” without relying on a particular crutch. There are no grand revelations or secret identities. Just one simple question: will Zuko help Iroh or Azula?"

Ian Cardona of Screen Rant made multiple comparisons between the two, stating that:

"In the sequel to A New Hope, Luke, Han and Leia found themselves on the run from a more menacing Empire in a film that was much darker and more spiritual than its predecessor. The Rebels were on the run from the Empire at every turn, and Luke learned more about the Force -- just as Aang learned about the Avatar. In fact, Luke learned about the Force and trained with Yoda on Dagobah, while Aang learned to harness the powers of the Avatar from Guru Pathik at the Eastern Air Temple. And just as Luke interrupted his training following a vision of his friends in trouble, Aang also left his spiritual quest unfinished after experiencing a vision of Katara in danger. But most importantly, while Season 1 of Avatar and A New Hope both conclude with the heroes victorious, Season 2 and The Empire Strikes Back end with a crushing defeat."
