= The Chase (Avatar: The Last Airbender) =

- Avatar: The Last Airbender episode
- Zuko, Toph, Katara, Aang, and Sokka facing off against Azula.
- Episode no.: Season 2 Episode 8
- Directed by: Giancarlo Volpe
- Written by: Joshua Hamilton
- Production code: 208
- Original air date: May 26, 2006

Episode chronology
← Previous "Zuko Alone"	Next → "Bitter Work"
- Avatar: The Last Airbender (season 2)

"The Chase" is the eighth episode of the second season of the American animated television series Avatar: The Last Airbender, and the 28th episode overall. The show follows Aang (Zach Tyler Eisen), the last airbender and the “Avatar”, on his journey to bring balance to a war-torn world by mastering all four elements: air, water, earth, and fire. On his quest, he is joined by companions Katara (Mae Whitman), Sokka (Jack DeSena), and Toph Beifong (Jessie Flower), and hunted down by Fire Nation prince Zuko (Dante Basco) and princess Azula (Grey DeLisle). The episode was written by Joshua Hamilton and directed by Giancarlo Volpe.

The episode, written by Joshua Hamilton and directed by Giancarlo Volpe, follows Aang and his friends trying to avoid a dangerous mysterious machine being led by Princess Azula, while Prince Zuko tracks his sister in the hopes of capturing Aang for himself. The episode marks the first time all six prominent characters of the show are featured in the same episode. The episode premiered on Nickelodeon on May 26, 2006, and received critical acclaim.

== Plot ==
Aang, Katara, Sokka and Toph land in a camping area for the night where quarrels emerge between Katara and Toph after the latter refuses to help the group set up camp. Later that night, Toph senses a mysterious machine heading their way. Instead of fighting it, the group gets on a shedding Appa and flies away. They land once again, and Katara continues to get agitated with Toph refusing to help set up camp. Toph fights back, saying that she can pull her own weight. They eventually begin to fall asleep after their fight, before Toph senses the same machine from earlier barreling towards them, leading to them packing up and flying out on Appa again.

When they are out of the machine's reach, the group tries to sleep once again with Katara speculating Zuko is the one behind the machine. When the machine arrives again, the group decides to take them on. Emerging from the machine are Azula and her two friends Mai and Ty Lee riding on moongoose lizards. After Azula bests them with her lightning generation abilities, the group flees again as sunrise arrives, Sokka complaining that they stayed up all night. The group lands once again, and after Katara and Toph get into another argument, Toph points out that it is Appa's fault they have gotten no sleep, as the machine is tracking Appa's shedding fur. A sleep-deprived Aang angrily snaps at Toph that Appa never had any problem when it was just the three of them, leading to Toph angrily storming off, declaring she quits as Aang's earthbending teacher. Afterwards, Aang and Katara sadly express their regrets about arguing with Toph.

Aang comes up with a plan to clean Appa and collects his fur to create a fake trail for Azula to follow while Katara and Sokka fly on Appa somewhere else. Azula however doesn't fall for the trap and sends Mai and Ty Lee after Appa while she follows the fake trail. Toph encounters Iroh who has been tracking Zuko ever since the two split up. (Note: As depicted in "Avatar Day") The two sit for tea, and Iroh finds similarities between Toph and his nephew, and advises Toph not to resist help from those who care about her. Toph takes Iroh's advice and tells Iroh that he should tell his nephew how much he cares about him. The two bid farewell and Toph goes to rejoin her friends.

Sokka and Katara engage in a battle with Mai and Ty Lee, where Sokka is paralyzed by Ty Lee's chi-blocking and Mai pins Katara to a tree with her knives. Appa manages to airbend Mai and Ty Lee into the river leading to the group's escape. In an old abandoned town, Azula reaches the end of the trail where she finds Aang waiting for her. She reveals to him that she is Zuko's younger sister and warns Aang there is nowhere to run. Zuko arrives, having tracked Azula's machine to the town. A mêlée à trois begins between Aang, Zuko and Azula in the town where eventually Aang, cornered by Azula, is saved by the arrival of Katara and Sokka. Toph and Iroh arrive to assist her friends and Zuko respectively. The six eventually work together to corner Azula. As Iroh notices Toph is part of the Avatar's group, Azula strikes him with a lightning strike leading to her being attacked by Sokka, Aang, Katara, Toph, and Zuko. In the aftermath, Azula is nowhere to be found and Zuko furiously forces everyone away, refusing help for Iroh from Katara. Appa flies the group away finally allowing them to get some sleep.

== Credits ==
Main cast members Zach Tyler Eisen, Mae Whitman, Jack DeSena, Jessie Flower, Dante Basco and Dee Bradley Baker appear as the voices of Aang, Katara, Sokka, Toph Beifong, Zuko, and Appa and Momo respectively. Appearing as guest stars are Mako as Zuko's uncle Iroh, Grey DeLisle as Zuko's sister Azula, Cricket Leigh as Azula's knife-throwing friend Mai, and Olivia Hack as Azula's acrobatic friend Ty Lee. This marks Flower's third appearance on the show voicing Toph.

The episode was directed by Giancarlo Volpe and written by Joshua Hamilton.

== Production ==
The animation for the episode was done by South Korean animation studio DR Movie.

According to series creators Michael Dante DiMartino and Bryan Konietzko on the DVD commentary of the episode, the episode was inspired by many Western films and TV series. The fight sequence between Aang, Zuko, and Azula was meant to resemble a Mexican standoff, a popular trope in many Western films. Like the final fight in the previous episode "Zuko Alone", the fight takes place at high noon when many typical Western battles take place. The chase sequence, in particularly when Azula and her friends emerge from the machine, was inspired by the chase in the 1969 film Butch Cassidy and the Sundance Kid.

The episode also features the first time all four elements are used against a single target, and the four elements are presented in the order in which Aang learns them: air, water, earth, and fire. The smile Azula makes when she finds Aang at the abandoned village was designed to be reminiscent to the smile Ozai made in the previous episode when watching Azula firebend. When Sokka makes a wig out of Appa's fur, the wig resembles Marge Simpson's haircut from The Simpsons.

== Critical reception ==
Tory Ireland Mell of IGN gave the episode a rating of 9.4 out of 10, writing "This episode was truly a page out of a Western, one of my favorite genres. From the art of the town to the direction, it all played out perfectly, even Zuko showing up, and the close-ups of Everyones eyes, fantastic. The final show down between Azula, and EVERYONE was brilliant, and completely shocking as Iroh got nailed with the blue lightning." Hayden Childs of The A.V. Club praised the episode writing " especially love Toph and Iroh’s exchange, a little warm moment between my two favorite characters where they each give the other some excellent advice. That the Avatar staff can stop the action to include a scene like this one is a testament to this show’s excellence."

In 2020, The Harvard Crimson ranked the episode as the 6th best episode of the series, writing "With the help of the rest of the Gaang, we see water, earth, fire, and air (and boomerang!) united for the first time against a common foe. Badass."
