= City of Walls and Secrets =

- Avatar: The Last Airbender episode
- Ba Sing Se
- Episode no.: Season 2 Episode 14
- Directed by: Lauren MacMullan
- Written by: Tim Hedrick
- Production code: 214
- Original air date: September 22, 2006

Guest appearance
- George Cheung as Pao

Episode chronology
← Previous "The Secret of the Fire Nation"	Next → "The Tales of Ba Sing Se"
- Avatar: The Last Airbender season 2

"City of Walls and Secrets" is the fourteenth episode of the second season of the American animated television series Avatar: The Last Airbender, and the 34th episode overall. The show follows Aang (Zach Tyler Eisen), the last airbender and the “Avatar”, on his journey to bring balance to a war-torn world by mastering all four elements: air, water, earth, and fire. On his quest, he is joined by companions Katara (Mae Whitman), Sokka (Jack DeSena), and Toph Beifong (Jessie Flower), and hunted down by Fire Nation prince Zuko (Dante Basco) and princess Azula (Grey DeLisle). The episode was written by Tim Hedrick and directed by Lauren MacMullan.

The episode, written by Tim Hedrick and directed by Lauren MacMullan, follows Aang and his friends finally arriving in Ba Sing Se where they begin their search to look for Aang's missing bison Appa (Dee Bradley Baker), but they soon realize the city is not what it seems. Meanwhile, Freedom Fighter Jet tries to prove that Zuko and Iroh (Mako Imawatsu) are firebenders, taking drastic action to do so. The episode premiered on Nickelodeon on September 22, 2006, and received positive reviews with praise on how they handled its themes of utilitarianism and indoctrination.

== Plot ==
Aang and his friends arrive in Ba Sing Se where they meet Joo Dee, their guide throughout the city. As the group tries to book an important with the Earth King to discuss the plan for invading the Fire Nation on the day of the solar eclipse, (Note: The plan was created after the group discovered an eclipse was coming in "The Library") Joo Dee tells them they will have to wait a month. When they start asking around, they find people are reluctant to talk about the war against the Fire Nation at all. However, one neighbor Pong warns them to steer clear of the Dai Li, the secret police force of Ba Sing Se. Meanwhile, Zuko and Iroh settle into their new Ba Sing Se home and get a job at a tea shop, while they are spied on by Jet, who is convinced they are firebenders.

After hearing the Earth Kingdom palace is hosting a party for a bear, Katara decides it is a good way to reach the Earth King. Katara and Toph dress up in fancy clothing and try to use Toph's Beifong family ticket to sneak into the party. However, it fails and they are bought into the party by a mysterious man named Long Feng. There they find Sokka and Aang have snuck into the party as helpers, but just as the Earth King joins the party, Dai Li agents capture the group as well as Momo. Meanwhile, Jet bursts into the teashop challenging Zuko and Iroh to a fight hoping they will firebend at him. However, Zuko steals someone's swords and the two duel throughout the city. The Dai Li eventually show up and, after hearing from eyewitnesses of the fight, arrest Jet.

The Dai Li agents bring Aang, Katara, Sokka, Toph, and Momo to meet their leader, Long Feng, who reveals that there is no mention of the war in Ba Sing Se to preserve the culture of the city and to ensure it remains a peaceful utopia, the last one on Earth. As Long Feng reveals this, Jet is taken underground and is brainwashed by Dai Li agents who repeat to him "there is no war in Ba Sing Se". It is also revealed that Long Feng is in charge of day-to-day matters in the city, including military matters, meaning the Earth King is just a figurehead. When Aang threatens to tell people about the war, Long Feng claims he will banish them from the city and stop Aang's quest to find Appa. As they are dismissed, Long Feng calls in Joo Dee to accompany them. The group stares in disbelief as they all realize that a different woman has taken the place of Joo Dee.

== Credits ==
Main cast members Zach Tyler Eisen, Mae Whitman, Jack DeSena, Jessie Flower, Dante Basco and Dee Bradley Baker appear as the voices of Aang, Katara, Sokka, Toph Beifong, Zuko, and Momo respectively. Appearing as guests are Mako as Zuko's uncle Iroh, Lauren Tom as the group's guide Joo Dee, Clancy Brown as the villainous Long Feng, Crawford Wilson as Freedom Fighter Jet, Nika Futterman as Jet's partner Smellerbee, and George Cheung as the group's neighbour Pao.

The episode was directed by Lauren MacMullan and written by Tim Hedrick.

== Production ==
The animation for the episode was done by JM Animation.

The episode marks the introduction of the city of Ba Sing Se, which had been previously mentioned in prior episodes. According to the show's official artwork and the podcast Avatar: Braving the Elements, Ba Sing Se's design was modelled off the architecture of China that the series creators Michael Dante DiMartino and Bryan Konietzko observed when they took a trip to China in between the production of book one and book two. This included designing the city based on designs seen in the Forbidden City and other locations around Beijing. The city is revealed to operate under social segregation, something Aang dislikes due to his nomadic way. It is also revealed Long Feng has been controlling the city and making it into a utopia, establishing the themes of utilitarianism and indoctrination that would continue to play out in future episodes. The episode has been noted to bear many similarities with the 2005 film Robots and the 1949 George Orwell novel Nineteen Eighty-Four. In creating Ba Sing Se's complex themes, the crew never had a concern that they would alienate the six-to-eleven year old target audience, with director Giancarlo Volpe stating that:

Younger kids don't often fully understand how oppressive governments work, but they do relate to having parents or teachers or other authority figures always telling them what to do. In a weird way, authoritarian dictatorships have the same master/subservient dynamic with their people as an adult does to children. Both are expected to do what they're told and never challenge authority.

The episode contains the Chinese folk song "Mo Li Hua" which is played during the Earth Kingdom palace party, and a reference is made to a quote from The Lord of the Rings: The Fellowship of the Ring when Joo Dee says "One doesn't just pop in on the Earth King." (Note: This can be seen as a reference to a famous quote from the film "One does not simply walk into Mordor" said by Boromir (Sean Bean).)

== Reception ==
Max Nicholson of IGN gave the episode a rating of 8.6 out of 10, praising the comic relief and the "wicked sword fight between Jet and Zuko". Hayden Childs of The A.V. Club praised MacMullan's direction claiming that "the visual flair she brings to each she contributes to its excellence", and also praised the episode's script for managing to "ground viewers in the richly imagined world of the city and to introduce the major themes of the next arc with a deft touch".

In 2020, The Harvard Crimson ranked the episode as the 34th best episode of the series writing "The origin of 'There is no war in Ba Sing Se.' When Jet accuses Zuko of being a firebender hiding in Iroh's tea shop, he jumps at the opportunity to duel a customer. As someone who has worked in a coffee shop: Honestly, same."

In 2007, the episode was nominated for "Outstanding Animated Program" at the 59th Primetime Creative Arts Emmy Awards, but it lost to South Park's "Make Love, Not Warcraft".
