= Avatar: The Last Airbender season 2 =

Second season of Avatar: The Last Airbender animation series

Avatar: The Last Airbender
- Season 2 Book Two: Earth
- DVD cover for the second season
- Showrunners: Michael Dante DiMartino; Bryan Konietzko
- Starring: Zach Tyler Eisen; Mae Whitman; Jack DeSena; Dante Basco; Jessie Flower; Dee Bradley Baker; Mako; Grey DeLisle
- No. of episodes: 20

Release
- Original network: Nickelodeon
- Original release: March 17 – December 1, 2006

Season chronology
- ← Previous; Book One: Water Next → Book Three: Fire

Book Two: Earth is the second season of Avatar: The Last Airbender, an American animated television series created and produced by Michael Dante DiMartino and Bryan Konietzko for Nickelodeon. The series starred Zach Tyler Eisen, Mae Whitman, Jack DeSena, Jessie Flower, Dante Basco, Dee Bradley Baker, Mako Iwamatsu (in his final voice performance as Iroh before his death), and Grey DeLisle as the main character voices.

In the second season, Aang and his friends Katara and Sokka are on a quest to find an Earthbending teacher which finishes when they recruit Toph Beifong. After finding important information concerning the war with the Fire Nation, Appa ends up kidnapped. Their journey leads to Ba Sing Se, the capital of the Earth Kingdom, where they uncover a great internal government conspiracy. Meanwhile, due to their actions at the North Pole in Book One, Zuko and Iroh are declared traitors by the Fire Nation and desert their country, becoming fugitives in the Earth Kingdom. Pursuing both Zuko and Aang is Princess Azula, Zuko's younger prodigy sister.

The second season aired on Nickelodeon from March 17 to December 1, 2006, and consisted of 20 episodes. The season received considerable acclaim, with the series being called "consistently excellent." The series won multiple awards, including Best Character Animation in a Television Production from the 34th Annie Awards and Outstanding Individual Achievement in Animation at the 2007 Emmy Awards.

Between January 23 and September 11, 2007, Paramount Home Entertainment released four DVD sets containing five episodes each before releasing the entire season as a boxset.

== Episodes ==
No. overall	No. in season	Title	Directed by	Written by	Storyboarded by	Original release date	Prod. code (Note: Production code format is taken from episode commentary for "Sozin's Comet: The Phoenix King")	U.S. viewers (millions)
21	1	"The Avatar State"	Giancarlo Volpe	Aaron Ehasz, Elizabeth Welch, Tim Hedrick & John O'Bryan	Oreste Canestrelli, Ian Graham, Bobby Rubio & Giancarlo Volpe	March 17, 2006	201	3.7
Aang and his friends travel to an Earth Kingdom base from which they are to be escorted to Omashu, where Aang intends for King Bumi to teach him earthbending. At the base, General Fong suggests that Aang can defeat the Fire Lord and end the war immediately by using the Avatar State. After many failed attempts, General Fong finally succeeds in triggering the Avatar State by faking Katara's death, which leads to Aang nearly destroying the base in rage. The spirit of Avatar Roku warns Aang that the Avatar State is a defense mechanism that empowers Aang with the skills and knowledge of all his past lives, though there is a catch: if he is killed in the Avatar State, the reincarnation cycle will be broken, causing the Avatar to cease to exist. The group decides to travel to Omashu alone. Meanwhile, Zuko and Iroh are visited by Zuko's younger sister Azula, who comes bearing a message from Ozai requesting their return home. The captain accidentally reveals the summons is a ruse in order to imprison them as traitors. Iroh and Zuko manage to escape, but are forced to become fugitives and cut off their topknots.
22	2	"The Cave of Two Lovers"	Lauren MacMullan	Joshua Hamilton	Chris Graham, Dean Kelly, Lauren MacMullan, Kenji Ono & Tomihiro Yamaguchi	March 24, 2006	202	N/A
While on the way to Omashu, Aang and the group meet a group of carefree traveling bards, who take them through a vast labyrinth of tunnels known as the Cave of Two Lovers. Zuko and Iroh are sheltered by kind villagers after Iroh accidentally drinks tea made of a poisonous plant. Song, a young and compassionate healer, shows Zuko the effects of war from a normal citizen's perspective. The group is separated in the tunnels by a cave-in, with Aang and Katara growing closer as they discover the origins of the cave, which includes the tombs of the first two earthbenders, who are the namesake of Omashu. Their torch burns out, plunging them into darkness and seemingly resulting in a kiss. Glowing lights are revealed in the ceiling, allowing the group to escape and make it to Omashu, which they discover has been conquered by the Fire Nation.
23	3	"Return to Omashu"	Ethan Spaulding	Elizabeth Welch	Miyuki Hoshikawa, Ethan Spaulding, Justin Ridge & Tomihiro Yamaguchi	April 7, 2006	203	N/A
Aang and his friends sneak into Omashu to find Bumi, with Sokka faking a deadly illness to scare off the guards. They meet a resistance movement who tells them that King Bumi surrendered on the day of the invasion. Meanwhile, Princess Azula decides that in order to catch Zuko and Iroh, she needs to stop traveling with the royal procession in favor of "a small, elite team." Aang Katara and Sokka help the city's entire population escape by faking an epidemic of Sokka's invented sickness Pentapox. The Fire Nation governor's toddler son Tom-Tom accidentally leaves with the citizens, mistaken for a kidnapping. The governor attempts to trade Tom-Tom for King Bumi, but Azula calls off the trade; she is now backed up by her childhood friends Mai, Tom-Tom's older sister, and Ty Lee, both skilled fighters. Aang manages to rescue Bumi after a fight with Azula, but Bumi refuses to leave, saying that the proper time for his escape has not arrived. He instructs Aang to find an earthbending teacher who "waits and listens before striking". Azula, Mai and Ty Lee set out on their mission, having now added Aang as their third target, while Aang returns Tom-Tom to his parents.
24	4	"The Swamp"	Giancarlo Volpe	Tim Hedrick	Oreste Canestrelli, Ian Graham, Bobby Rubio & Giancarlo Volpe	April 14, 2006	204	2.7
While flying, Aang and his friends are attracted to a mysterious swamp and are separated from one another. They begin to see unique illusions in the swamp: Sokka sees Princess Yue, Katara sees her late mother, and Aang sees a mysterious giggling girl and a flying boar. They are reunited and attacked by a swamp monster who turns out to be a wise man from a tribe of swamp waterbenders who use the moisture inside the swamp's plants to manipulate the plants and hide their identities. He explains that all beings in the world are connected much like the swamp, as the swamp is a single large tree, and the visions are of people they have met or will meet, believing that time and death are illusions. Meanwhile Zuko, disgusted with having to live as a beggar, dons the mask of the Blue Spirit once again.
25	5	"Avatar Day"	Lauren MacMullan	John O'Bryan	Chris Graham, Seung-Hyun Oh, Dean Kelly, Lauren MacMullan & Kenji Ono	April 28, 2006	205	N/A
Aang and friends stumble upon a town celebrating an Anti-Avatar Day. The villagers blame Avatar Kyoshi, one of Aang's previous incarnations, for killing their leader, Chin the Great. Aang reveals his identity and is arrested for Kyoshi's supposed crimes. Zuko disguises himself as the Blue Spirit to steal food for himself and his uncle. Iroh is not happy with what Zuko is doing, and Zuko decides it is best that they part ways. Katara and Sokka investigate and find evidence that seems to support Kyoshi's innocence. However, at Aang's trial, Kyoshi's spirit appears and recounts the events that led to Chin the Great's death: a "horrible tyrant", he was confronted by Kyoshi defending her home, who ultimately split Kyoshi Island from the mainland herself, causing Chin to die from a fall when he refused to back away from the cliff Kyoshi created. Aang is convicted but subsequently pardoned after he defeats a group of Fire Nation soldiers attacking the village, and the town changes the anti-Avatar celebration to a pro-Avatar celebration.
26	6	"The Blind Bandit"	Ethan Spaulding	Michael Dante DiMartino	Miyuki Hoshikawa, Bryan Konietzko, Justin Ridge, Ethan Spaulding & Tomihiro Yamaguchi	May 5, 2006	206	N/A
Aang is still searching for an earthbending teacher, but with little success. At an underground earthbending tournament, the group witnesses a fighter named The Boulder defeat most of the other fighters but then is bested by a young girl named "The Blind Bandit", whom Aang recognizes as the girl from his vision in the swamp. She uses earthbending to sense her environment, perceiving the lay of the land around her; fitting Bumi's advice that Aang's earthbending instructor should be someone who "waits and listens before striking." Aang tells two earthbending students about his vision in the swamp of a girl with a flying boar, who tell him that a flying boar is the symbol of the wealthy Beifong family. Aang, Katara, and Sokka find the girl, Toph, at her estate, but she cannot become Aang's teacher due to her overprotective parents, who only allow local earthbending teacher Master Yu to teach her moves well below her skill level. The tournament's host Xin Fu and several earthbending fighters kidnap Aang and Toph, thinking they collaborated to cheat the other fighters out of the prize money. Toph reveals her power by defeating Xin Fu's gang singlehandedly, but her parents become even more restrictive. She runs away from home and joins the group. Toph's father, believing Aang has kidnapped her, promise Xin Fu and Master Yu a chest of gold if they bring her back.
27	7	"Zuko Alone"	Lauren MacMullan	Elizabeth Welch	Chris Graham, Dean Kelly, Lauren MacMullan & Kenji Ono	May 12, 2006	207	N/A
After leaving Iroh, Zuko continues his journey through an Earth Kingdom town where a young boy named Lee befriends him. Zuko remembers his childhood, including Azula's chilling and callous behavior towards the death of Iroh's only child Lu Ten and his own perseverance through lack of support from his father. Finally he recalls his mother's last words of encouragement to him, followed by the announcement that his grandfather Azulon has died and his mother has suddenly disappeared. Ozai became the new Fire Lord in accordance with Azulon’s supposed dying wish. Lee is kidnapped by abusive Earth Kingdom soldiers after pulling a knife that Zuko gave him. While saving Lee, Zuko inadvertently reveals his identity as the prince of the Fire Nation. Lee, his family, and the townspeople furiously turn against him because of it. Note: This was Walker Edmiston's final voice role before his death in 2007.
28	8	"The Chase"	Giancarlo Volpe	Joshua Hamilton	Oreste Canestrelli, Michael Dante DiMartino, Ian Graham, Bobby Rubio & Giancarlo Volpe	May 26, 2006	208	2.9
Aang and his friends are relentlessly chased by Azula, Mai, and Ty Lee, which makes it impossible for the group to stop and sleep. The lack of sleep makes everyone irritable, and fuels a quarrel between Katara and Toph. Toph realizes they are being tracked by means of Appa's shed fur. Aang lashes out at Toph for criticizing Appa, causing Toph to leave the group. Aang takes some of Appa's fur to act as a decoy to lure their pursuers away from Katara and Sokka, but he is found by Azula in an abandoned village. Toph meanwhile runs into Iroh, who reminds her that it is not a sign of weakness to accept help from others the way she believes. He also reveals that he is tracking his nephew, trying to let him discover his own path. Aang battles Azula and later Zuko, but is joined by his friends just in time, as well as by Iroh. Azula feigns surrender when she is cornered six-on-one, but wounds Iroh and utilizes the ensuing chaos to escape. Katara and the group offer to help Zuko, but he furiously rebuffs them and lashes out at them to leave. The group finally get some much-needed sleep as Zuko tends to his severely-wounded uncle.
29	9	"Bitter Work"	Ethan Spaulding	Aaron Ehasz	Michael Chang, Miyuki Hoshikawa, Justin Ridge, Ethan Spaulding & Tomihiro Yamaguchi	June 2, 2006	209	N/A
Aang begins his earthbending training with Toph, but grows frustrated when he encounters difficulty with earth, the natural opposite of air. Aang's inclination towards agility and evasion puts him at a disadvantage with earthbending, which requires a more direct, resolute form of combat. Elsewhere, Zuko struggles with a similar dilemma as Iroh tries to teach him lightning-bending, an advanced form of firebending; Zuko's anger keeps him from having the cold precision lightning-bending requires. When Sokka is endangered by a saber-toothed Moose-Lion, Aang is able to save him by firmly standing his ground as an earthbender would, leading to his first successful try at earthbending. After being taught by Iroh the significance of drawing wisdom from all four nations, much like the Avatar, Zuko claims he's ready to try and re-direct real lightning, a technique Iroh invented by studying the waterbenders. Iroh staunchly refuses, with Zuko resorting to standing on a mountaintop during a storm while tearfully screaming at the heavens to strike him like they have in the past.
30	10	"The Library"	Giancarlo Volpe	John O'Bryan	Oreste Canestrelli, Ian Graham, Bobby Rubio & Giancarlo Volpe	July 14, 2006	210	N/A
Sokka decides the group needs some intelligence to defeat the Fire Nation. At an oasis, the group encounters Professor Zei from Ba Sing Se University, who tells them of Wan Shi Tong's library in the Si Wong desert, said to contain a vast collection of knowledge. The professor and the group eventually locate the library nearly buried, but intact inside. Toph refuses to descend with the others and stays outside with Appa. Wan Shi Tong, a large spirit owl, tells the group that humans are no longer permitted in the library, as they only seek knowledge to gain an advantage over other humans. The group convinces him otherwise, and begin searching for information. Sokka discovers a crucial weakness of the Fire Nation that could end the war: an upcoming solar eclipse will prevent firebending for its duration. Wan Shi Tong catches them in their lie and refuses to allow them to leave with the knowledge. He begins sinking the library before chasing the group. Outside, while Toph is busy keeping the library afloat, Appa is kidnapped by a gang of sandbenders. As Professor Zei stays behind, too fascinated by the knowledge in the sinking library, the others escape but Aang is devastated by the loss of Appa. Note: This is part one of the 44-minute special "The Fury of Aang".
31	11	"The Desert"	Lauren MacMullan	Tim Hedrick	Chris Graham, Dean Kelly, Lauren MacMullan & Kenji Ono	July 14, 2006	211	N/A
Team Avatar is stranded in the desert, without sufficient provisions to make the trek out again now that they no longer have Appa. Elsewhere, Iroh reveals a mysterious association with the Order of the White Lotus when he uses a White Lotus tile as an opening move in a match of Pai Sho, his favorite game. The move functions as a message to his opponent, who then helps protect Iroh and Zuko from Xin Fu and Master Yu, who decide to take a break from hunting Toph to try and collect the bounty on the two fugitives. After a long trek and much hardship in the desert, Aang confronts the sandbenders who stole Appa, and learns that Appa was traded to a merchant and is likely en route to Ba Sing Se to be sold. Upon hearing that Appa was muzzled, Aang becomes so angry that he enters the Avatar State, destroying nearly everything around him, but is eventually calmed by Katara. Note: This is part two of the 44-minute special "The Fury of Aang".
32	12	"The Serpent's Pass"	Ethan Spaulding	Michael Dante DiMartino & Joshua Hamilton	Miyuki Hoshikawa, Justin Ridge, Ethan Spaulding & Tomihiro Yamaguchi	September 15, 2006	212	4.1
After leaving the desert, the group fortuitously meets Suki and attempts to lead a pregnant woman named Ying and her family through the Serpent's Pass, a dangerous route to the outskirts of Ba Sing Se. They are attacked by a Fire Nation ship and narrowly escape. Suki and Sokka attempt to rekindle their relationship, but Sokka is hesitant and overprotective due to being unable to save Yue. Meanwhile, Iroh and Zuko, assuming new identities as Earth Kingdom refugees, are also on their way to start a new life in the Earth Kingdom capital. They encounter Jet and his fellow Freedom Fighters Smellerbee and Longshot, with whom Zuko starts to bond. Aang and the group are attacked again, this time by the route's namesake. He and Katara defeat the serpent and the group finally lays eyes on the great wall of Ba Sing Se. Ying goes into labor and delivers her daughter, named Hope after inspiration from Aang. Sokka and Suki share their first kiss, while Aang confesses to Katara how the happiness of Ying's family reminds him how he feels about Appa and her. Aang departs with Momo to find Appa in Ba Sing Se, but is shocked to see that a massive Fire Nation drill is approaching the wall of Ba Sing Se. Note: This is part one of the 44-minute special "The Secret of the Fire Nation" and listed in the DVD as the two-part episode "Journey to Ba Sing Se".
33	13	"The Drill"	Giancarlo Volpe	Michael Dante DiMartino & Bryan Konietzko	Oreste Canestrelli, Chris Graham, Ian Graham, Dean Kelly, Kenji Ono, Bobby Rubio & Giancarlo Volpe	September 15, 2006	213	4.1
Aang returns to his friends intent on stopping the drill. Though their offer to help is initially refused by the Earth Kingdom general at the Outer Wall, Team Avatar begins finding a way to take down the drill. They determine the best way is to sabotage the drill from the inside, then deliver a final blow to the top of the structure to take it down. Battling Azula, Mai and Ty Lee, Aang successfully stops the drill with it still plugging the hole in the outer wall. Meanwhile, Jet wishes to recruit Zuko for the Freedom Fighters, but Zuko bluntly refuses. Jet becomes suspicious of the two when he sees that Iroh heated his own cup of tea using firebending. He becomes intent on exposing Iroh and Zuko, while Team Avatar finally makes their way into Ba Sing Se. Note: This is part two of the 44-minute special "The Secret of the Fire Nation" and listed in the DVD as the two-part episode "Journey to Ba Sing Se".
34	14	"City of Walls and Secrets"	Lauren MacMullan	Tim Hedrick	Chris Graham, Dean Kelly, Lauren MacMullan & Kenji Ono	September 22, 2006	214	N/A
Aang and the rest of the group arrive in Ba Sing Se, determined to find Appa and inform the Earth King about the eclipse. They soon discover that the bureaucracy surrounding the king, enforced by the Dai Li, the "cultural authority" of Ba Sing Se, blocks them from making contact with him. Katara devises a plan to see the Earth King by sneaking into a party at the Royal Palace. The quartet is eventually found out and greeted by Long Feng, Grand Secretariat of Ba Sing Se and the head of the Dai Li. Long Feng reveals that the Earth King has no true political power, only serving as a figurehead and is completely oblivious of the war, while he and the Dai Li control the city, ensuring Ba Sing Se remains a utopia. Long Feng makes an indirect threat regarding their goal of finding Appa if they speak out, noting that they will now be watched 24/7 by Dai Li agents. Elsewhere, Jet becomes obsessed with gathering evidence that Iroh and Zuko are firebenders. His final attempt, confronting the pair at the tea shop they work in, ends in his arrest and subsequent brainwashing by the Dai Li. Note: This was nominated for a Primetime Emmy for Outstanding Animated Program (For Programming Less Than One Hour).
35	15	"The Tales of Ba Sing Se"	Ethan Spaulding	See note for screenwriters (Note: "The Tales of Ba Sing Se" is a collection of short stories that each have their own writer(s); they are as follows: The Tale of Toph and Katara: Joann Estoesta & Lisa Wahlander; The Tale of Iroh: Andrew Huebner; The Tale of Aang: Gary Scheppke; The Tale of Sokka: Lauren MacMullan; The Tale of Zuko: Katie Mattila; The Tale of Momo: Justin Ridge & Giancarlo Volpe)	Michael Chang, Joaquim Dos Santos, Ian Graham, Miyuki Hoshikawa & Ethan Spaulding	September 29, 2006	215	N/A
The episode is a set of vignettes about each of the main characters' adventures in Ba Sing Se, providing a glimpse of their personalities and private lives: Katara and Toph have a girls' day out in the inner city.; Iroh provides small gestures of kindness to various people in the outer city, before venturing into the country to find a place to celebrate the birthday of his son, Lu Ten, who was killed in the siege of Ba Sing Se many years previous. Kneeling before a portrait of his son, Iroh tearfully sings "Leaves from the Vine", a folk song about a young soldier returning home.; Aang helps a zookeeper build a new zoo outside the wall.; Sokka accidentally ends up in a girls-only poetry club.; Zuko goes out on a date, resisting at first but winds up enjoying himself.; Momo looks through Ba Sing Se for Appa, finding only one of his footprints.; Note: Iroh's tale was dedicated to his voice actor Mako Iwamatsu, who had died just one week after episodes 30 and 31 initially aired.
36	16	"Appa's Lost Days"	Giancarlo Volpe	Elizabeth Welch	Oreste Canestrelli, Ian Graham, Bobby Rubio & Giancarlo Volpe	October 13, 2006	216	N/A
After being abducted in the desert, Appa is traded to a Fire Nation circus, where the trainer whips, humiliates, and generally mistreats him. He eventually escapes with the help of a small boy. He later unwillingly fights a Boarcupine, emerging victorious but badly wounded. By fortune, Suki and the Kyoshi Warriors come across Appa and help him recover from his injuries, but the warriors are attacked by Azula, Mai and Ty Lee. Appa is forced to flee at Suki's urging, while Suki's fate against Azula is left unknown. Dispirited, confused, and longing for Aang, Appa returns to his childhood home at the Eastern Air Temple, where he discovers a mysterious guru, Pathik, has taken residence in the ruins. The guru gains his trust and imparts to him Aang's location at Ba Sing Se, with a message for Aang attached to his horn. Appa arrives at Ba Sing Se, but just short of reuniting with Aang he is ambushed and captured by Long Feng, leaving the footprint that Momo found. Note: This episode won a Humane Society award for its portrayal of the mistreatment of animals.
37	17	"Lake Laogai"	Lauren MacMullan	Tim Hedrick	Joaquim Dos Santos, Chris Graham, Dean Kelly, Lauren MacMullan & Kenji Ono	November 3, 2006	217	2.8
As the group searches for Appa, they run into Jet, who falsely claims that he has information on Appa's whereabouts. A chance encounter with Smellerbee and Longshot reveals to Team Avatar that Jet had been arrested by the Dai Li a few weeks ago. They eventually break Jet's brainwashing and travel to a facility located underneath Lake Laogai, in hopes of finding Appa. Instead, they find Long Feng and the Dai Li waiting for them, declaring them enemies of the state. Elsewhere, Zuko discovers that Aang is in the city looking for Appa, and sets out as the Blue Spirit to find the bison. He locates Appa before Aang under Lake Laogai and plans to capture him, but Iroh arrives to confront him. Iroh furiously scolds Zuko and asks if Zuko is chasing his own destiny, or a destiny someone else is trying to force on him, resulting in Zuko releasing Appa. Aang, Jet and the group battle Long Feng and the Dai Li; Jet is fatally wounded as a result while Long Feng escapes. Team Avatar pursues, which ends in their reuniting with Appa and temporarily defeating Long Feng and his men. Iroh and Zuko exit the compound, with Zuko tossing his Blue Spirit mask into the lake at Iroh's suggestion.
38	18	"The Earth King"	Ethan Spaulding	John O'Bryan	Michael Chang, Joaquim Dos Santos, Miyuki Hoshikawa & Ethan Spaulding	November 17, 2006	218	N/A
The group breaks into the Earth King's palace to tell him about the war. They eventually convince the king by showing him the destroyed Fire Nation drill, resulting in Long Feng seemingly being arrested for treason. Meanwhile, Zuko fights an illness which Iroh believes is a manifestation of the deep internal conflict within himself after setting Appa free. Team Avatar is presented with information that was intercepted by Long Feng: Toph receives a letter from her mother saying she is in Ba Sing Se and wants to see her. Sokka and Katara are given an intelligence report that confirms the location of their father Hakoda, while Aang receives the letter from Guru Pathik, offering to help him master the Avatar State. The team decides to temporarily part ways to accomplish all their goals. Unbeknownst to them as they leave, Azula, Mai and Ty Lee slip into Ba Sing Se impersonating the Kyoshi Warriors. The letter from Toph's mother is revealed to be a setup for her capture by Xin Fu and Master Yu, while Long Feng is shown to still be in command of the Dai Li while in prison.
39	19	"The Guru"	Giancarlo Volpe	Michael Dante DiMartino & Bryan Konietzko	Oreste Canestrelli, Ian Graham, Bobby Rubio & Giancarlo Volpe	December 1, 2006	219	4.4
Aang travels to the Eastern Air Temple and meets Guru Pathik, who trains him to master the Avatar State through the unlocking of his seven chakras, a process which must be completed without interruption. Sokka finally reunites with his father Hakoda. The Earth King tells the disguised Kyoshi Warriors of the plan to invade the Fire Nation during the solar eclipse. Azula plots with Mai and Ty Lee to organize a coup and take down Ba Sing Se from the inside. Toph manages to escape Xin Fu and Master Yu by teaching herself metalbending. Azula Mai and Ty Lee deceive Long Feng's agents into believing they have blown their cover, setting Azula's plan in motion. Katara discovers Iroh and Zuko are in the city and rushes to warn Suki, only to discover she is actually Azula. Katara is captured, and Azula decides it is time to go after her brother and uncle. Just as Aang is about to reach enlightenment, which requires letting go of his attachment to Katara, he has a vision of Katara in danger and chooses to help her, against Pathik's warning that he will be cut off from the Avatar State entirely. Iroh and Zuko receive a message inviting them to serve tea to the Earth King at the Royal Palace. Aang picks up Sokka from Chameleon Bay and flies back to Ba Sing Se. Azula is brought to Long Feng's cell, who proposes that he can bring Azula the Avatar in exchange for restoring the Earth King's trust in him.
40	20	"The Crossroads of Destiny"	Michael Dante DiMartino	Aaron Ehasz	Michael Dante DiMartino, Chris Graham, Dean Kelly, Kenji Ono & Michael Chang	December 1, 2006	220	4.4
Aang and Sokka reunite with Toph and set out to find Katara. Azula has been placed in charge of the Dai Li by Long Feng during the coup. Iroh and Zuko are greeted at the palace by Azula and the Dai Li. Iroh evades capture, but Zuko is quickly overwhelmed and thrown in prison with Katara. Iroh finds Aang Sokka and Toph, joining forces to save their loved ones with help from a captured Dai Li agent. Sokka and Toph rush to the palace to warn the King of the coup, but they arrive as it begins. They reach the throne room, only to be defeated by Azula, Mai, and Ty Lee. As they and the King are led away, Long Feng arrives intent on double-crossing Azula, only to find that the Dai Li no longer obey him. In prison, Katara lashes out at Zuko for the trauma the war has put her through, with the two later bonding over the loss of their mothers. Aang and Iroh arrive at Katara and Zuko's cell to rescue them, just as Katara was pondering using water from the North Pole spirit oasis to heal Zuko's scar. Azula then appears and traps Iroh, offering Zuko his honor if he joins her. Aang and Katara try to escape, but are attacked by Azula, the Dai Li and Zuko, who has made up his mind. Aang attempts to let go of his attachment to Katara and begins to enter the Avatar State, but is killed by Azula's lightning strike before he can complete the task. This interruption prevents Aang from clearing his last chakra, and leaves his attachment to Katara intact. Iroh intervenes to help Katara escape with Aang and is captured. Katara uses the oasis water to resurrect Aang, as Team Avatar and the Earth King fly over the wall in defeat.

== Production ==
The season was produced by Nickelodeon Animation Studio and aired on Nickelodeon, both of which are owned by Viacom. The season's executive producers and co-creators are Michael Dante DiMartino and Bryan Konietzko, who worked alongside head writer and co-producer Aaron Ehasz. Most of the individual episodes were directed by Ethan Spaulding, Lauren MacMullan and Giancarlo Volpe. Episodes were written by a team of writers, which consisted of Aaron Ehasz, Elizabeth Welch, Tim Hedrick, John O'Bryan; along with creators DiMartino and Konietzko.

The season's music was composed by "The Track Team", which consists of Jeremy Zuckerman and Benjamin Wynn, who were known to the show's creators because Zuckerman was Konietzko's roommate.

== Cast ==
Most of the main characters from the first season remained the same: Zach Tyler Eisen voices Aang, Mae Whitman voices Katara, Jack DeSena voices Sokka, Dee Bradley Baker voices both Appa and Momo, and Dante Basco voices Zuko.

In addition, several new characters appear: Jessie Flower voices Toph Beifong, Grey DeLisle voices Azula, Cricket Leigh voices Mai, Olivia Hack voices Ty Lee, and Clancy Brown voices Long Feng.

Mako Iwamatsu, who voiced Iroh in the first two seasons, died from throat cancer after production was completed; he was replaced by Greg Baldwin for the following season and The Legend of Korra. Credited under additional voices, Baldwin also voiced Iroh for brief portions in "The Tales of Ba Sing Se", "The Earth King", and "The Crossroads of Destiny", all of which were mixed in with Iwamatsu's recordings. This practice was similarly used with Master Splinter in TMNT, a character also voiced by Iwamatsu before his death.

In the episode "The Tales of Ba Sing Se", the segment titled "The Tale of Iroh" features a dedication to Mako at the end when Iroh is tearfully singing to mourn the loss of his only child, Lu Ten.

== Reception ==
In a review of the Volume 2 DVD Release for Book 2, Gabriel Powers from DVDActive.com described the series as one of the best children's series in recent times, making comparisons with Samurai Jack and Justice League, and complimented it for its depth and humour. Powers also comments:

Without dumbing down its characters, plots, or humour, and without overtly taming-up the action or peril, Avatar manages to enthral children and adults, ages 4 to 56...There is a genuine classic feel to the series, which uses actual Asian culture and lore as its base. Like Star Wars, the creative forces behind the show have tapped into that basic, generation spanning storytelling that will live long after the series' youngest fans are old and bitter.

For the video and audio quality, Powers says "Season two generally looks better than the bulk of season one, but still has some issues" concerning image sharpness. Rotten Tomatoes gave it an 87% fresh rating in 2008. Jamie S. Rich from DVD Talk says that "As a flat concept, Avatar the Last Airbender is nothing special, but in execution, it is head and shoulders above other children's entertainment", and that "as a whole, the look of Avatar is consistently excellent".

The show also received acclaim for its visual appeal. In the 34th Annie Awards, the show was nominated for and won the "Best Character Animation in a Television Production" award, for Jae-Myung Yu's animation in "The Blind Bandit", and the "Best Directing in an Animated Television Production" award, for the episode "The Drill". In 2007, the show was nominated for "Outstanding Animated Program" in the 2007 Emmy Awards for the "City of Walls and Secrets" episode, though it did not win. However, the show did win the "Outstanding Individual Achievement in Animation" award for Sang-Jin Kim's animation in the "Lake Laogai" episode.

== Home media release ==
Nickelodeon began releasing DVDs for Book 2 on January 23, 2007. The first four DVD releases contain one disc that consisted of five episodes each. The final DVD was the "Complete Book 2 Box Set", which contains all of the episodes in the season on four discs, and packaged with a special features disc. All of the DVD sets for Book 2 were released with Region 1 encoding, meaning that they can only play on North American DVD players. Book 2 was released on Region 2 on July 20, 2009.

Volume	Discs	Episodes	Region 1 release	Region 2 release	Region 3 release
1	1	5	January 23, 2007	Not released	June 4, 2009
2	1	5	April 10, 2007	Not released	August 6, 2009
3	1	5	May 22, 2007	Not released	October 29, 2009
4	1	5	August 14, 2007	Not released	March 31, 2010
Box set	4	20	September 11, 2007	July 20, 2009	September 9, 2010

== Other Media ==
=== Soundtrack ===
In 2025, the soundtrack to the second season was released.
