= Soccer (disambiguation) =

Soccer (/sɒˈkər/) or association football is a team sport in which players primarily use their feet to propel a ball around the field.

Soccer may also refer to:

- Soccer (1982 video game), a video game for the Atari 8-bit computers
- Soccer (1985 video game), a video game for the Family Computer and Nintendo Entertainment System
- Soccer (1991 video game), a video game for the Game Boy
- Soccer (dog), a Jack Russell terrier dog actor

== See also ==
- Soca (disambiguation)
- Sokka
