= The Tales of Ba Sing Se =

- Avatar: The Last Airbender episode
- The episode's title card
- Episode no.: Season 2 Episode 15
- Directed by: Ethan Spaulding
- Written by: Joann Estoesta and Lisa Wahlander (Toph and Katara); Andrew Huebner (Iroh); Gary Scheppke (Aang); Lauren MacMullan (Sokka); Katie Mattila (Zuko); Justin Ridge and Giancarlo Volpe (Momo)
- Production code: 215
- Original air date: September 29, 2006

Episode chronology
← Previous "City of Walls and Secrets"	Next → "Appa's Lost Days"
- Avatar: The Last Airbender (season 2)

"The Tales of Ba Sing Se" is the 15th episode of the second season of the animated television series Avatar: The Last Airbender, and the 35th episode overall. The episode, directed by Ethan Spaulding, originally aired on Nickelodeon on September 29, 2006. It features six short vignettes of several of the series's main characters as they go about a day in the city of Ba Sing Se. The episode constitutes a break from the previous more serious, plot-heavy episodes, and instead focuses on character development; the main plot of the season is advanced only in one of the six vignettes, the tale of the winged lemur Momo.

The first tale, written by Joann Estoesta and Lisa Wahlander, is of Katara and Toph, who spend a day at the spa. The sage yet comedic Iroh's tale is next, written by Andrew Huebner; he helps various residents of Ba Sing Se, before making a tearful tribute to his son, who died in combat trying to conquer the city. Aang helps a zookeeper, though not without causing some trouble (written by Gary Scheppke). Sokka inadvertently enters a haiku contest (written by Lauren MacMullan). The generally brooding Zuko goes on a date (written by Katie Mattila). The last tale, written by Justin Ridge and Giancarlo Volpe, centers on Momo, who searches for Aang's lost pet skybison, Appa.

"The Tales of Ba Sing Se" received widespread acclaim from critics, with reviewers considering it to be one of the series' best episodes. "The Tale of Iroh" has been especially well-reviewed and is a fan favorite. The episode was dedicated to Iroh's voice actor, Mako Iwamatsu, who died before the episode's airing.

== Plot synopsis ==
- Katara and Toph have a "Girl's Day Out" at the Fancy Lady Day Spa. After they get a makeover, Toph gets teased by some girls on a bridge. Toph and Katara use their bending to send the girls down a river.
- While strolling through a market, Iroh stops and buys a few things at a street stand. Continuing his walk, he uses his wisdom to help the people he encounters. Iroh comes to rest upon a hill with a large tree, where he sets up a memorial for the birthday of his deceased son, Lu Ten. (This segment of the episode ends with a dedication to Mako Iwamatsu, Iroh's voice actor, who died on July 21, 2006 of esophageal cancer.)
- Flying high over Ba Sing Se, Aang lands at a small zoo looking for Appa. The Zookeeper tells Aang that he would like nothing more than to let his animals run wild in open spaces. Aang suggests moving the animals outside to an open area just outside the city. The animals prove too difficult to control and Aang uses his Bending powers to create a new zoo.
- Sokka finds a haiku class full of pretty girls. While peeking through the window, enjoying the 'show', he is shoved from behind by an ostrich horse and winds up inside, where he gets into a haiku contest with the teacher. Sokka eventually adds an extra syllable to the final line, causing him to be ejected from the room by a large guard.
- Working at the teahouse, Zuko reluctantly goes on a date with a girl named Jin. She asks Zuko about his life, which causes Zuko to make up a story that he and Iroh were part of a traveling circus before they came to Ba Sing Se. They exchange a couple kisses, but Zuko quickly breaks away and returns to his apartment.
- Momo decides to continue searching the city for Appa while being pursued by a trio of Pygmy Pumas. After befriending and then losing them, a tired Momo lies down in a giant footprint. (Note: Later revealed to be Appa's in "Appa's Lost Days".)

== Reception ==
"The Tales of Ba Sing Se" received widespread acclaim from critics, with "The Tale of Iroh" being particularly highlighted, and is considered by critics and fans alike to be one of the best episodes of Avatar.

The Daily Dot reviewed it as the "best episode of Avatar", noting that it is a much-needed break in an otherwise dark period of the series. The episode falls in the middle of the protagonist's search for the skybison Appa, and provided character building in a lighter atmosphere. The Daily Dot picked Zuko, Momo, and Iroh's tales as the best, noting that Iroh's was "especially memorable". Iroh is often a comedic relief to the brooding Zuko, but the Daily Dot noted this episode provides another, more emotional side of Iroh. The episode also explains why Iroh is going to such great lengths to try to save his nephew Zuko, so that he will not die in war like his son did.

CBR noted that "The Tales of Ba Sing Se" was an example of the great filler episodes in Avatar, and a departure from the generally bland filler episodes in many television shows. CBR especially praised Iroh's tribute to his son as an example of Avatar's character building, and described it as "the most touching and memorable tale".

The Mary Sue described the episode as highly emotional.
