= The Drill =

The Drill may refer to:

- The Drill (Avatar: The Last Airbender), the 33rd episode of Avatar: The Last Airbender
- The Drill (album) by Wire
- Matt Schwartz (born 1971), United Kingdom DJ, also known as The Drill
- The Drill (band), house music group of UK producer Matt Schwartz
