= Soca =

Soca or SOCA may refer to:

== Government ==
- Serious Organised Crime Agency (SOCA), a former public body of the United Kingdom
- Sexual Offences and Community Affairs (SOCA), a South African government unit established to combat gender-based violence

== Places ==
- Soča, a river in Slovenia and Italy
- Soča, Bovec, Slovenia
- Cayenne – Félix Eboué Airport, by ICAO code
- Soca, a village in Banloc Commune, Timiș County, Romania
- SoCa, abbreviation for Southern California

== Other uses ==
- Soča dialect, spoken in the Upper Soča Valley
- Soca music, a Caribbean music genre
- Socapex, a brand of electrical connector used for stage lighting, leading to use of the term "Soca" for similar off-brand connectors

== See also ==
- Soca Twins, a DJ group from Germany
- Socca, a team ball game, variant of football
- Socca, a type of chickpea flour pancake from Provencal and also in Italy as farinata
- Isonzo (disambiguation), another name of the river
