= Soccer tennis =

"Soccer tennis" may refer to:

- Football tennis, a sport played on a field in which players hit a football (soccer ball) over a low net
- Teqball, a sport resembling table tennis in which players hit a soccer ball (football) across a curved table

== See also ==
- Footvolley, a sport which combines aspects of beach volleyball and association football
- Soccer (disambiguation)
- Football (disambiguation)
- Tennis (disambiguation)
