= Avatar: The Last Airbender – Quest for Balance =

- Developer: Bamtang Games
- Publisher: GameMill Entertainment
- Director: Adam Johnson
- Producers: Danielle Villar; Alison Portocarrero; Diego Tudela
- Designer: Carlos Salazar
- Programmer: Jesús Blas
- Writers: Ivan Visalot; David Bergantino
- Composer: Charles Loli
- Engine: Unreal Engine 5
- Platforms: Nintendo Switch; PlayStation 4; PlayStation 5; Windows; Xbox One; Xbox Series X and S
- Release: September 22, 2023
- Genre: Action-adventure
- Modes: Single-player, Multiplayer

Avatar: The Last Airbender – Quest for Balance is a 2023 action adventure video game based on the animated television series from Nickelodeon and was developed by Bamtang Games and published by GameMill Entertainment. It was released on September 22, 2023 for Nintendo Switch, PlayStation 4, PlayStation 5, Windows, Xbox One and Xbox Series X and S, and has received mixed reviews upon release.

== Gameplay and premise ==
Setting after the series, Pakku, Bumi, and Iroh recount the events of the Books to the Ba Sing Se theater director Zongying at the Jasmine Dragon for a more accurate version of Aang's origins and how he became the Avatar with his friends's help during the 100 Year War against the Fire Nation than the one retold from the Ember Island Players as historically accurated.

Retold from the eldery trio as a somewhat embellished version of the story, over 18 chapters based on the fan-favorite episodes from the series, players will control Aang, Sokka, Katara, Toph, Zuko, and others through the events in single player and/or co-op, using elemental powers from Aang or Katara to tackle puzzles and facing familiar foes such as Azula to the Fire Lord Ozai.

== Development and release ==
The game was announced on June 2023. It was later announced on August 2023 that the game would be released next month on September 22.

== Reception ==
Reception

Review score
Publication	Score
IGN	4/10

Avatar: The Last Airbender – Quest for Balance received "mixed or average" reviews. Tom Mawks from IGN states on a 4 out of 10 that Quest for Balance is a mess, with clunky combat, way too many pointless puzzles, and baffling choices for which scenes from the series to highlight. Tyler Treese of Comingsoon.net gives the game a 5 out of 10, saying that Quest for Balance never really impresses, but winds up becoming aggressively fine as it goes on and expectations are lowered.
