= Isonzo (disambiguation) =

The Isonzo is a river in northeast Italy, called the Soča in Slovenia.

It may also refer to:

- The Isonzo Front, an Italian theatre of operations during the First World War
- Isonzo DOC, a wine-producing area in northeast Italy
- 14th Infantry Division "Isonzo", an Italian Army unit during the Second World War
- Isonzo (video game), first-person shooter video game from 2022
