= Soca Twins =

Soca Twins is a sound system from Berlin, Germany, with Franky Fire as DJ and Boone Chatta as MC. Founded in 2002, they are the first soca sound system from Germany.

== Career ==
Soca Twins became known in the international soca scene with live shows in the US, Canada, Trinidad, Bermuda, England, Italy, Sweden, Austria, Switzerland, Russia, Slovakia, and the Netherlands. The media described Soca Twins as one of the “world's best soca sounds” with “cult status”.

Soca Twins won the award for “International Soca DJ of the Year” at the International Soca Awards 2011 in Port of Spain, Trinidad and Tobago, after being nominated for the sixth time in a row. In 2008, their soca mix Addicted 2 Soca won the award for “Best Soca DJ Mix”.
