= Appa (Avatar: The Last Airbender) =

Fictional animal in Avatar: The Last Airbender

- Avatar Legends character
- Momo (left) with Appa (right)
- First appearance: "The Boy in the Iceberg" (2005)
- Last appearance: "Avatar Aang: The Last Airbender" (2026)
- Created by: Michael Dante DiMartino; Bryan Konietzko
- Designed by: Michael Dante DiMartino; Bryan Konietzko
- Voiced by: Dee Bradley Baker (vocal effects, cartoon, video games, films, 2024 TV series); Matthew Yang King (vocal effects, 2024 TV series)

In-universe information
- Nickname: Sheddy (by Toph)
- Species: Sky bison
- Gender: Male
- Nationality: Air Nomads
- Bending element: Airbending (master)

Appa (Chinese: 阿柏; pinyin: ābǎi) is a fictional character in the Nickelodeon animated television series Avatar: The Last Airbender and in the film The Last Airbender, and is part of the Avatar: The Last Airbender world. In the series, Appa is a flying bison, a species of animals that can fly naturally, and is the animal spirit guide of the protagonist, Aang. Dee Bradley Baker voices Appa, along with all the other animals, in both the TV series and the film.

== Creation and conception ==
The show's creators Michael Dante DiMartino and Bryan Konietzko have described Appa's appearance as a cross between a buffalo and a manatee, although his body plan does resemble that of a water bear. According to an interview with the artists involved with creating the show, Appa's design was based on Catbus from My Neighbor Totoro, as they found it difficult to create a six-legged mammal.

The design and backstory of Appa underwent significant development, as documented in the official series art book. The first drawing of the creature that would become Appa was made alongside the second drawing of Aang. Early concepts by Konietzko, coming off work on Invader Zim, showed Aang shepherding a herd of flying bison. The concept was scaled down for practicality, first to a family group and finally to the single companion, Appa. His six-legged design was a direct homage to the Catbus from Hayao Miyazaki's My Neighbor Totoro. Konietzko defined Appa as a bison-manatee hybrid, studying their anatomy to refine the design for hand animation. Early design elements like spiral horns were simplified for animation. The creators envisioned Aang and Appa suspended in a hollow pocket of energy within the iceberg, rather than frozen solid, though depicting this proved too complex.

Later production details include the episode "Appa's Lost Days" winning a Genesis Award for its depiction of animal cruelty, and the creative process behind sequences like a samurai-style battle between Appa and Momo. For the series finale invasion, Appa was given armor derived from unused toy design submissions. The creators joked about a potential series ending where Appa would be revealed as female, having restored the flying bison population, an idea celebrated in a 2009 Comic-Con poster.

== Habits ==
In the Avatar franchise, Appa is the last known living sky bison, which are large mammal-like creatures that fly through airbending and steer through air currents with their broad tails. The bison are covered in thick white fur with a large brown arrow marking that is remarked to be extremely itchy. In the show, the markings on the flying bison's backs are what inspired the tattoos which symbolize an Air Nomad's mastery of Airbending. Their fur is shed at the end of winter. The Air Nomads summon the sky bison to their side through the use of whistles that only the animals can hear. Aang and his friends use the words "yip yip" to get Appa to take off into the air.

Like all animals in the Avatar series, Appa cannot speak, apart from in one episode in which Aang hallucinates Appa and Momo talking.

=== Personality ===
Throughout the series, Appa has demonstrated high intelligence and often appears to understand a portion of human speech, whereas Momo, the winged lemur, struggles to understand. Although placid, Appa has shown himself capable of fighting when necessary. Appa never turns down food and would eat whatever he sees as tasty, mainly because he has five stomachs.

Other aspects of Appa's character include his fear of fire and his trusting of those who have been kind to him. He can become quite temperamental towards anyone who he thinks is a threat to himself or his friends, especially Aang. Conversely, he has demonstrated an unrestrained affection towards those he likes. Appa also has a fear of going underground or in small tunnels, evidenced by his claustrophobic panic in the episode "The Cave of Two Lovers".

He has a special friendship with Momo the lemur, with whom he is often in company. Appa also shows a special preference towards Zuko, who saved him from his imprisonment beneath Lake Laogai.

== Appearances ==
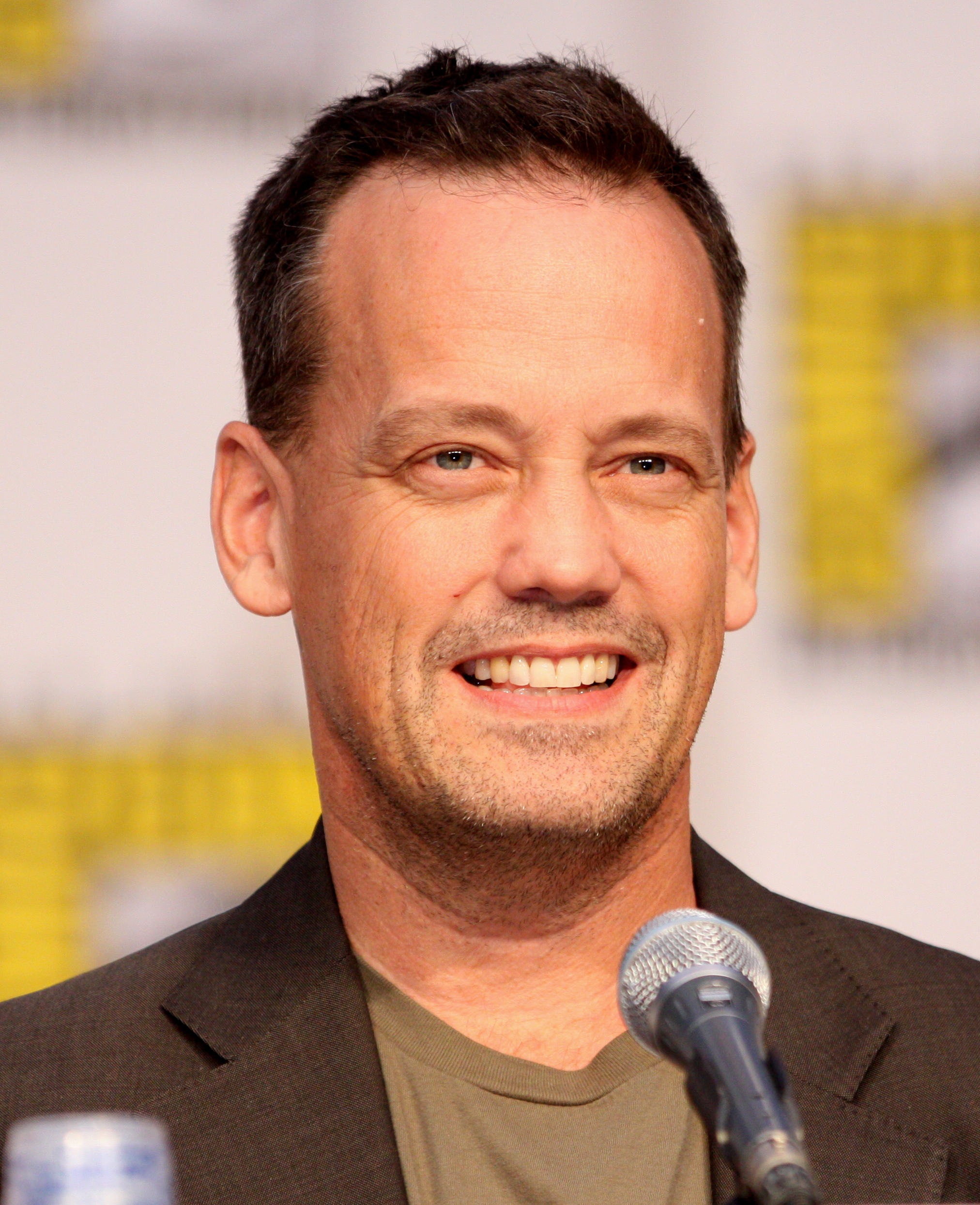
Dee Bradley Baker is the voice behind Appa for both the animated series and the film.

Appa is featured prominently throughout the franchise, not only in the Avatar: The Last Airbender TV series, but also in the film The Last Airbender, various video games, and comic books. Dee Bradley Baker voices Appa in both the TV series and the film.

=== In the animated series ===
Appa is in almost every episode of the animated series, having appeared in 58 of the 61 episodes of the three seasons. Much of the back-story about the character comes from the episode "Appa's Lost Days", "in which the most under-explored member of the team gets his very own episode."

The first meeting between Aang and Appa is seen during a flashback sequence in Appa's Lost Days. It is tradition with Air Nomads that each young Airbender is given a sky bison calf once they come of age to be the Airbender's lifelong animal companion. In a flashback on Appa's Lost Days, Appa's herd flies down to an Air Nomad Temple where Aang and other young Airbenders are waiting. Aang brings Appa an apple as a sign of friendship, which Appa accepts, sealing their bond as well as giving Appa his name, after the word "apple". Almost immediately, the two became friends and would remain close, Appa being the one thing aside from his staff and robes from Aang's home that Aang took with him when he fled the Southern Air Temple.

Appa remained in suspended animation along with Aang for 100 years until their discovery by Katara and Sokka. Since then, Appa has been the group's main form of transportation in their quest, as well as occasionally assisting in battle. Appa was a consistent part of the group throughout the series until his capture by the Sandbenders in "The Library".

Appa became lost for a short time when the group was traveling in the Earth Kingdom. He was kidnapped by Sandbenders in the middle of the vast Si Wong desert, while Aang, Katara, Sokka, and their winged lemur Momo were trapped in a vast underground library. It is later revealed that he was eventually sold to a Fire Nation circus where an animal tamer attempted to make him part of the show. Appa later escaped and journeyed throughout the Earth Kingdom until he encountered the Kyoshi Island Warriors, who attempted to heal the various wounds he had sustained in his travels and escort him back to Aang. Appa was forced to leave after an attack by Azula and her allies, ushered away by Suki while the warriors tried to delay the three Fire Nation girls. On his journey he encountered a sadhu named Guru Pathik at the Eastern Air Temple, to which he had fled. Being healed of his personal turmoil and directed to Aang by the sadhu, Appa flew to Ba Sing Se, where he was captured by Long Feng.

Appa was kept in a secret location at Lake Laogai until his rescue by Zuko, who was initially planning on utilizing him to capture the Avatar. Appa eventually returns to the main group in the last scenes of Lake Laogai.

Appa still accompanies Aang and his group even after they enter the Fire Nation. However, in order to make sure that he does not give away Aang's identity when flying, Aang covers Appa with clouds as a disguise while in flight.

At the Western Air Temple, he was among the first members of the group to accept Zuko as Aang's firebending teacher, as he is still grateful for Zuko freeing him in Ba Sing Se. He flew Aang and Zuko to the Sun Warrior Temple in order to learn the origin of firebending.

He also flew Zuko and Katara to the Southern Raiders ship, so Katara could confront the murderer of her mother.

After the search for Aang in the finale failed, the group was forced to divide their efforts to prevent the Fire Nation from wiping out the Earth Kingdom. Appa flew Zuko and Katara to the Fire Nation capital where they fought and defeated Azula before she could assume leadership of the throne. Afterward, Appa is last seen outside of Iroh's tea shop in Ba Sing Se, listening to Iroh play a horn.

=== In the film ===
Appa as he appears in the live action movie The Last Airbender.

Appa appears in the 2010 live-action film The Last Airbender with roar effects provided by Dee Bradley Baker. Appa's role in the film has been noted to be significantly less prominent than in the animated series.

The sky bison was rendered entirely in computer graphics for the film by Industrial Light & Magic (ILM), with Pablo Helman as visual-effects supervisor. Regarding the challenges of adapting the cartoon Appa into a realistic-looking CGI beast, Helman said:

"He has six legs, and that's a big challenge for us, because how do you take it into reality? There is no reference for a creature with six legs. Nature doesn't create those things. It's very difficult to get six legs to do the right thing. We looked at how elephants walked, which helped. We did some tests and figured out Appa would pretty much move like an elephant."

ILM animators also looked at polar bears while imagining the two front legs moving as arms while Appa walked.

=== In other media ===
The first video game Appa appeared in is the 2006 Avatar: The Last Airbender. Appa also appears in Avatar: The Last Airbender - The Burning Earth and in Avatar: The Last Airbender - Into the Inferno. In the Avatar: The Last Airbender Plug It In & Play TV Game, Appa takes center stage in "Appa Air Attack" in which Appa destroys Fire Nation airships using his airbending abilities.

== Promotion and merchandising ==
Appa has been featured in varying pieces of merchandise, including toys and plush dolls. The sky bison has also been featured as a McDonald's Happy Meal toy—with Appa as a launcher that shoots out Momo, the flying lemur.

== Reception and legacy ==
KidsTelly.com's Dan G. Hughes noted that "the flying six legged bison has a lovingly sketched personality," further commenting how every character (including Appa) changes and grows throughout the series. Kevin Fitzpatrick of UGO Entertainment praised Appa's "love and courage throughout the series" citing how "our cuddly 8-foot tall buddy [is] willing to face any danger, and overcome any hardship to return to his master."

Leading up to the opening of The Last Airbender, reporter Kofi Outlaw of Screen Rant remarked that Appa "is a fan-favorite of the series." Similarly, Edward Douglas noted in Superhero Hype! that "Two of the characters from the cartoon fans are most anxious to see brought to life aren't even human. They are Appa, Aang's six-legged flying bison, and Momo, his flying pet lemur." The film trailer shown during the Super Bowl led UGO Entertainment critic Jordan Hoffman to ask, "Where's Appa?" as the sole complaint, noting the character's lack of prominence in the preview. Correspondingly, MTV's Rick Marshall provided instructions online on "how to find the elusive Appa" for the character's brief appearance in the background of a trailer scene.

As with the rest of the film, Appa's appearance in The Last Airbender was met with largely negative reviews. Geekosystem's Susana Polo found the CGI version of Appa "really quite creepy," noting "that prey animals (like bison) have eyes on the sides of their heads, and so moving them to the front without changing rest of the facial structure tips us right into the Uncanny Valley." With regards to the film's scripting, io9 reviewer Meredith Woerner wrote, "The saddest cut by far was watching Appa and Momo's personalities disappear."

Based on previews of Netflix's Avatar live-action production, Polo felt that the new depiction was not as "absolutely cursed" as the Shyamalan version.

In season 4 of the television series Star Wars: The Clone Wars, Clone Commander Appo has a white arrow on his helmet referencing Appa. The supervising director of The Clone Wars, Dave Filoni, worked on the first season of Avatar. Appa's voice actor, Dee Bradley Baker, also voices Commander Appo (amongst other clones) in The Clone Wars series.
