= Michaela Jill Murphy =

American voice actress (born 1994)

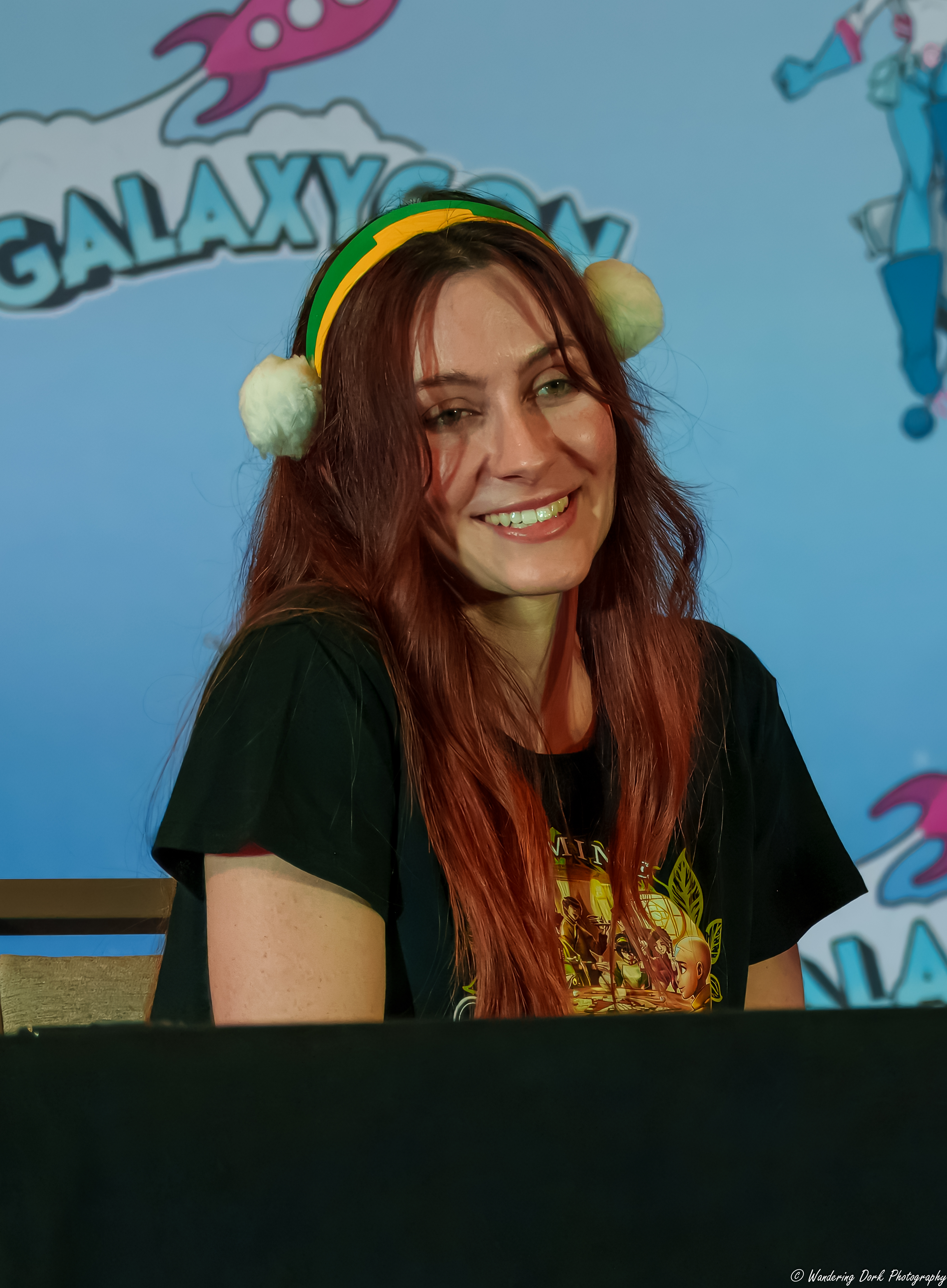
- Murphy in 2025 at GalaxyCon Oklahoma City
- Born: August 18, 1994 (age 32); Southern Indiana, U.S.
- Other name: Jessie Flower
- Education: Yale University (BA)
- Occupation: Voice actress
- Years active: 2003–present
- Website: www.michaelajillmurphy.com

Michaela Jill Murphy (born August 18, 1994), also known by her stage name Jessie Flower, is an American voice actress. She is best known for voicing Toph Beifong in Avatar: The Last Airbender and Chaca in Kronk's New Groove and The Emperor's New School.

== Early life ==
Murphy was born in Southern Indiana and is of Irish descent. She became interested in acting at the age of four, and her mother, Evette, moved them to Los Angeles to begin her career, where she appeared in commercials for Barbie and Mitsubishi. She starred as an orphan in Oliver! when she was five.

== Career ==
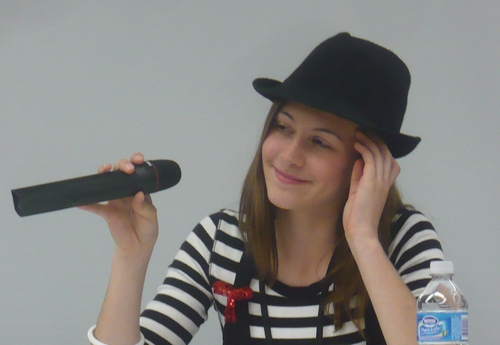
Murphy at Anime North in 2009

Murphy played the role of Chaca in Kronk's New Groove, and reprised the role in the spin-off series The Emperor's New School. She later called it the "most fun" voice acting she has ever done.

In 2005, Murphy voiced Meng in an episode of the Nickelodeon animated series Avatar: The Last Airbender. Her performance convinced creators Bryan Konietzko and Michael Dante DiMartino to cast her as main cast member Toph Beifong because of the "energy" she brought to the role. Murphy later told The Tab that she continued voicing Toph until her first year in high school and called the role her favorite voice acting experience and said she felt "pretty connected" to Toph's character, although she was only eleven years old when she was cast. She would also describe the second-season episode "The Library" as one of her favorite episodes in the series.

Murphy later admitted that she is rarely recognized in public, even when cosplaying as Toph at San Diego Comic-Con without any recognizing her as the voice actor of Toph. She later appeared as a guest on the official companion podcast for the series, Avatar: Braving the Elements, hosted by Dante Basco and Janet Varney, where she would talk about Toph and what the character "meant to her," with Basco describing Murphy as a "dear friend" and praising Toph's character. In a 2023, Murphy said that while she would "love to come back and do stuff" for the franchise, she supported the vision of the show's creators, including possible recasting.

She would voice other characters in animated films and series after Avatar: The Last Airbender. This included the character Peggy in Random! Cartoons (2008–2009), young Franny in the film Meet the Robinsons (2007), and other characters in the film Curious George (2006), along with Chaca in The Emperor's New School (2006) and The Emperor's New Groove 2: Kronk's New Groove (2005).

In 2014, Murphy guest-starred in The Legend of Korra as Toph's daughter Suyin Beifong. It was later described as helping lay the groundwork of Suyin's "personality while also paying tribute to her original role."

Murphy became an assistant theater manager at Yale University in fall 2014, but did not perform until the next year, joining the university's theater scene, working on a production of Mr. Burns, a Post-Electric Play and performing in the musical Hello Again, among other productions. She graduated from Yale University in 2017, where she majored in a dual B.A. in Theater and Film Studies with concentrations in Playwrighting and Screenwriting. Before that, she voiced the English dubbed voice of Eiko Carol in the World of Final Fantasy video game.

In 2021, Murphy provided the voice of Nasse in the English dub of Platinum End. The next year, she provided the voice of a minor character in the English dubbed version of Super Cub.

== Personal life ==
Murphy resides in Los Angeles. In July 2025, Murphy said she was bisexual but would "like to marry a man" and have children. In June 2021, she celebrated Pride Month in an Instagram post, writing that "there have been many who don't swing my way, on multiple gender fronts, and that's okay!"

In September 2020, Murphy founded Bandit Basics, an e-commerce platform that sells merchandise inspired by Toph Beifong and the Avatar: The Last Airbender universe.

== Filmography ==
=== Film ===
Year	Title	Role	Notes
2003	Finding Nemo	Additional voices	Credited as Jessie Flower
2004	Spider-Man 2	ADR cast	Uncredited
2005	Kronk's New Groove	Chaca	Credited as Jessie Flower
2006	Curious George	Kid #4	Credited as Jessie Flower
2006	Akeelah and the Bee	ADR cast	Credited as Jessie Flower
2006	Over the Hedge	Additional voices	Credited as Jessie Flower
2006	The Ant Bully	Additional voices	Uncredited
2006	Brother Bear 2	Young Nita, additional voices	Credited as Jessie Flower
2006	Night at the Museum	ADR cast	Credited as Jessie Flower
2007	Meet the Robinsons	Young Franny	Credited as Jessie Flower
2008	An American Affair	Additional voices	Credited as Jessie Flower
2011	Justin Bieber: Never Say Never	ADR cast	Uncredited
2011	That's What I Am	Additional voices	Credited as Jessie Flower

=== Television ===
Year	Title	Role	Notes
2005–2008	Avatar: The Last Airbender	Meng, Toph Beifong	Credited as Jessie Flower
2006	The X's	Girl, Ghost	2 episodes; credited as Jessie Flower
2006–2008	The Emperor's New School	Chaca	Credited as Jessie Flower
2008	Random! Cartoons	Peggy	Episode: "Tiffany"; Credited as Jessie Flower
2014	The Legend of Korra	Young Suyin Beifong	Episode: "Old Wounds"; Credited as Jessie Flower
2021	Super Cub	Clerk	English dub Episode: "Reiko"
2021	Platinum End	Nasse	English dub Credited as Michaela Murphy
2022	Camp WWE	Bianca Belair	Episode: "Sicked Slaughter"
2025	Mono	An Kiriyama	English dub Credited as Michaela Murphy
2026	The Elusive Samurai	Mima Sasaki	English dub

=== Web animation ===
Year	Title	Role	Notes
2026	Inanimate Insanity	Melon	Credited as Jessie Flower

=== Shorts ===
Year	Title	Role	Notes
2009	ATLA: Deformed Super Shorts	Toph Beifong	Credited as Jessie Flower
2015	Recording	Cassidy	Credited as Michaela Murphy
2016	The Profit	Diane	Credited as Jessie Flower
2016	Happy Endings	Lily	Credited as Jessie Flower
2018	The Flickering Forest	Forest Sprite	Credited as Michaela Murphy
2021	Stalgia	Kate	Also director
2021	The Letter	Ellie	

=== Video games ===
Year	Title	Role	Notes
2007	Avatar: The Last Airbender – The Burning Earth	Toph Beifong	Credited as Jessie Flower
2008	Avatar: The Last Airbender – Into the Inferno	Toph Beifong	Credited as Jessie Flower
2011	Nicktoons MLB	Toph Beifong	Credited as Jessie Flower
2016	World of Final Fantasy	Eiko Carol	English dub, uncredited
2024	Goddess of Victory: Nikke	Mirror, Red Shoes	English dub, uncredited
2026	Zenless Zone Zero	Phoenix Reffaella	English dub

=== Music Videos ===
Year	Title	Artist
2026	Starring Me (As Myself)	Sorry Ghost
