= Avatar: The Last Airbender – Into the Inferno =

2008 video game

- European box cover
- Developers: THQ Studio Australia; Halfbrick (DS)
- Publisher: THQ
- Platforms: Wii, Nintendo DS, PlayStation 2
- Release: NA: October 13, 2008; AU: October 30, 2008; NZ: October 31, 2008; EU: October 31, 2008
- Genre: Action-adventure
- Modes: Single-player, multiplayer

Avatar: The Last Airbender – Into the Inferno (known as Avatar: The Legend of Aang – Into the Inferno in Europe) is a 2008 video game based on the Nickelodeon animated TV series Avatar: The Last Airbender. Like the previous two games which were set in the first and second seasons, the game's setting is based upon the show's third and final season. The Wii version was released on October 13, 2008, in North America and on November 1, 2008, in the UK. A PS2 version is also available and was released on October 31, 2008, in the UK.

== Gameplay ==
Gameplay styles vary on different platforms. In the Nintendo DS version, the characters have very large heads, giving the game a cartoonish feel. Katara's ice bridge ability returns from the previous games. Sokka's boomerang is used to disintegrate out-of-reach objects or to solve puzzles; the player draws a path for the boomerang to follow. Toph can earthbend small platforms to get over gaps with spikes and Aang can make whirlwinds to either change directions of objects or to get them across gaps.

The Nintendo Wii and Sony PlayStation 2 versions provide a completely different way to play. Fire balls, rocks and water can all be picked up by holding the B button and are guided using the primary controller (Wii Remote on Nintendo Wii) provided there is a nearby source. Aang can form a sphere of high winds (canonically called an "air ball") to break down obstacles and blow away objects by making a circle with the primary controller.

Toph can lift up earth and throw it, pull earth out of walls and lift it up to make pillars. Katara can bend water to put out fires and can freeze it into an ice block by shaking the secondary controller (Nunchuk on Nintendo Wii). Ice can also be pulled out of waterfalls and ice pillars can be made. Prince Zuko can guide fire and burn things. Sokka throws his boomerang when the B button is pressed. Avatar Aang is unique, in that canonically he can bend all four elements, but only fights using airbending.

== Reception ==
Reception

Aggregate scores
Aggregator	Score
GameRankings	68.14% (DS); 63% (WII); 47.25% (PS2)
Metacritic	65/100 (DS); 53/100 (WII); 48/100 (PS2)

Review score
Publication	Score
IGN	5.8/10 (DS); 5/10 (PS2/WII)

The game received mixed reviews. On Metacritic the Nintendo DS version has a score of 65% based on reviews from 5 critics, the Wii version has a score of 53% based on reviews from 5 critics.

Aaron Thornton, from IGN, called it "a game destined to be forgotten". Gandem Jones, from Screen Rant, was severe in his criticisms, saying the games in the series "have generally been mediocre".

In a positive review, Alex Dale from GamesRadar+, described the game as "endearing" and "relaxing gaming fodder".
