= Zach Tyler Eisen =

American voice actor (born 1993)

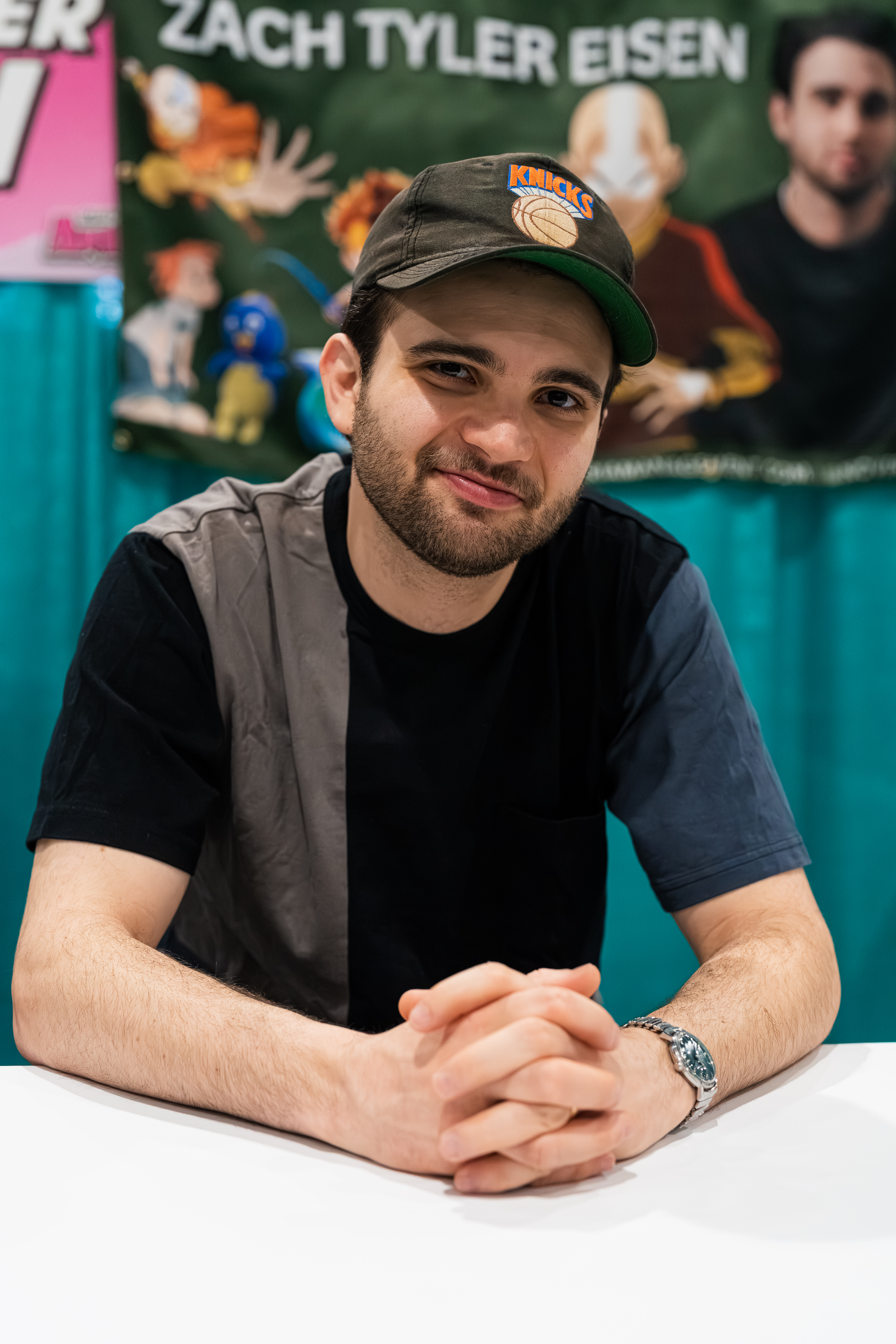
- Eisen at Animate! Raleigh in 2026
- Born: Zachary Tyler Eisen; September 23, 1993 (age 33); Stamford, Connecticut, U.S.
- Occupation: Actor
- Years active: 1998–2008 • 2023–present

Zachary Tyler Eisen (born September 23, 1993) is an American actor. He voiced Aang in Nickelodeon's Avatar: The Last Airbender, Lucas Nickle in The Ant Bully, Andrew in Little Bill and Pablo in the 2004 animated TV series The Backyardigans. His film roles include Entropy (1999) and Marci X (2003). While living in Connecticut, he did most of his Avatar: The Last Airbender recordings via satellite from there and New York. As of January 2021, he works in the entertainment industry "behind the camera".

== Early life ==
Zachary Tyler Eisen was born in Stamford, Connecticut, to a Jewish-American family.

== Career ==
He first acted as Lucas in Phil Joanou's film Entropy. He then started his voice role as Wee Willy, the main character in the unaired Nickelodeon/Nick Jr. pitch pilot for the PBS Kids TV series Super Why!. His next voice role was as Andrew Mulligan in the Bill Cosby–created Nickelodeon series Little Bill. Eisen later appeared on a 2000 episode of Nick Jr.'s Dora the Explorer as Baby Red Fish and portrayed a boy in Richard Benjamin's Marci X. He was cast as Pablo in the children's TV show The Backyardigans for its first season. In the last three seasons of the series, he was replaced by Jake Goldberg. He then provided the voice of Aang in Nickelodeon's Avatar: The Last Airbender. He voiced Lucas Nickle in the movie The Ant Bully.

He also has done voice work for video games, reprising his role as Lucas Nickle for the video game The Ant Bully and as Aang in the Avatar: The Last Airbender video games, including the series' titular video game adaptation, Avatar: The Last Airbender – The Burning Earth and Avatar: The Last Airbender – Into the Inferno.

== Filmography ==
=== Film ===
Year	Title	Role	Notes	Ref.
1999	Entropy	Lucas	Credited as Zachary Tyler	
2003	Marci X	Boy		
2006	The Ant Bully	Lucas Nickle (voice)		

=== Television ===
Year	Title	Role	Notes	Ref.
1999	Super Why!	Wee Willie/Super Why (voice)	Pilot Episode (Unaired) Credited as Zachary Tyler	
1999–2002	Little Bill	Andrew Mulligan (voice)	29 episodes	
2000	Dora the Explorer	Baby Red Fish (voice)	Episode: "Fish Out of Water"	
2004–06	The Backyardigans	Pablo (voice)	Main role (season 1), 20 episodes	
2005–08	Avatar: The Last Airbender	Aang (voice)	Lead role, 60 episodes	
2023	Lost Odyssey: Shadows of Destiny	Boba	filmed as a one-shot in support of Extra Life	

=== Video games ===
Year	Title	Voice role	Notes	Ref.
2006	The Ant Bully	Lucas Nickle		
2006	Avatar: The Last Airbender	Aang		
2007	Avatar: The Last Airbender – The Burning Earth	Aang		
2008	Avatar: The Last Airbender – Into the Inferno	Aang		
