= Jack DeSena =

American actor (born 1987)

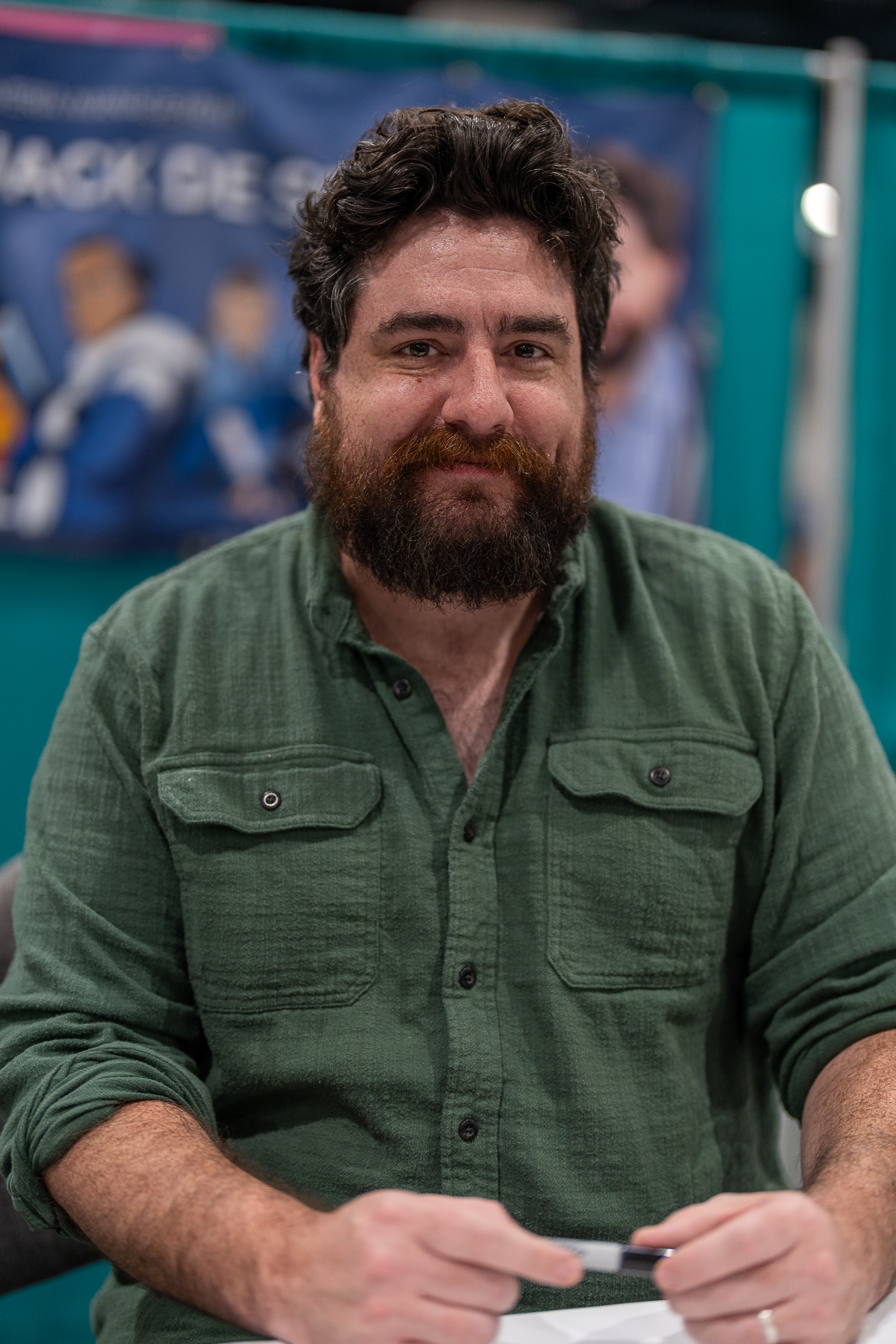
- DeSena at Animate! Raleigh in 2026
- Born: John Patrick De Sena; December 6, 1987 (age 38); Boston, Massachusetts, U.S.
- Occupation: Actor
- Years active: 2001–present
- Spouse: Lisa Bierman (m. 2018)
- Children: 2

John Patrick De Sena (/dəˈsɛnə/; born December 6, 1987), better known by his stage name Jack DeSena, is an American actor and comedian. He is best known for his work on the sketch comedy series All That, and voicing Sokka on the Nickelodeon series Avatar: The Last Airbender and Prince Callum on the Netflix series The Dragon Prince.

== Biography ==
De Sena was born on December 6, 1987, in Boston, Massachusetts. His family moved to Irvine, California in 1999, where he then attended Irvine High School. After, he attended UCLA. He was a very active member of the international ComedySportz troupe (a comic improvisation team that participates in games as seen on Whose Line Is It Anyway?). Having joined All That's cast at the start of its 7th season in 2002, he subsequently tied with Logan Lerman for the 2005 Young Artist Award for Best Performance in a TV Series (Comedy or Drama) - Leading Young Actor. He rapidly gained recognition for his skilled and clever ad-libbing from his work as Sokka on Avatar: The Last Airbender and also guest starred as Jimmy Olsen in The Batman.

De Sena worked on the online mockumentary web series Dorm Life, a 2008 Webby Honoree for Best Writing and Comedy: Individual Short or Episode. De Sena appeared on an episode of King of the Hill, "Luanne Gets Lucky." De Sena has also appeared in an episode of Generator Rex, "Crash and Burn." In 2012, De Sena appeared on the Hulu original series Battleground. In 2013, he appeared as the judge of the texting competition and later as an airport investigator on the Nickelodeon sitcom Sam & Cat. In 2014, he voiced Robin in the animated film JLA Adventures: Trapped in Time.

He has also portrayed "Mr. Roberts" in the television series 100 Things to Do Before High School from 2014 to 2016.

Since January 19, 2016, he and his longtime friend Chris W. Smith have been creating and starring in comedy sketches on their YouTube channel "Chris and Jack".

From 2018 to 2024, he was the voice of Callum on the Netflix animated series The Dragon Prince.

== Filmography ==
=== Film ===
Year	Title	Role	Notes
2006	The Wild	Eze	Voice
2014	JLA Adventures: Trapped in Time	Robin	Voice, direct-to-video
2015	Movies in Space	The CORPLOX Race	Short film
2016	The White Room	Mysterious Man	Short film; also co-director and producer
2016	The Veil	Christian	
2018	I Got This	Chris	Short film
2018	Missing Words	Unknown	Short film
2019	They Won't Last	Alex	Short film
2019	How To Get Out of Jury Duty	Unknown	Short film
2021	Too Late	David Zeller	
2024	Me, Myself & the Void	Jack	

=== Television ===
Key
†	Denotes television productions that have not yet been released

Year	Title	Role	Notes
2002–2005	All That	Regular Performer	35 episodes
2004	Grounded for Life	Jack / Jimmy's Friend	2 episodes
2005–2008	Avatar: The Last Airbender	Sokka (voice)	Main role
2007	King of the Hill	Kevin (voice)	Episode: "Luanne Gets Lucky"
2007	The Batman	Jimmy Olsen (voice)	Episode: "The Batman/Superman Story"
2008–2009	Dorm Life	Shane Reilly	46 episodes; also writer
2011	Generator Rex	Rand, Lance (voice)	Episode: "Crash & Burn"
2012	Battleground	Cole Graner	13 episodes
2013	Sam & Cat	Head Judge	Episode: "#TextingCompetition"
2014	Melissa & Joey	James	Episode: "My Roof, My Rules"
2014–2016	100 Things to Do Before High School	Mr. Roberts	22 episodes
2016	House of Lies	Bruce	Episode: "Violent Agreement"
2016	Legendary Dudas	Wizard Waiter	Episode: "King Sam/Karate Kids"
2016–present	Chris & Jack	Various roles	28 episodes; web series
2017	Veep	Hayden	Episode: "Omaha"
2017	Seven Bucks Digital Studios	Writer	Episode: "The Rock/s Independence Day Backyard Brawl with Wonder Woman's Samantha Jo"
2018	Sorry for Your Loss	Unknown	Episode: "A Widow Walks into a Wedding"
2018–2024	The Dragon Prince	Prince Callum (voice)	Main role
2020–2024	Lego Monkie Kid	Monkie Kid (voice), additional voices	Main role
2024	Go! Go! Loser Ranger!	Fighter C (voice)	English dub
2025	Mobile Suit Gundam GQuuuuuuX	Jezzi (voice)	English dub
TBA	The Coop †	Writer	2 episodes
TBA	The Dragon King †	Prince Callum (voice)	In production; funded by a Kickstarter campaign

=== Video games ===
Year	Title	Voice role	Notes
2006	Avatar: The Last Airbender	Sokka	
2007	Avatar: The Last Airbender – The Burning Earth	Sokka	
2008	Avatar: The Last Airbender – Into the Inferno	Sokka	
2011	Nicktoons MLB	Dudley Puppy	

=== Podcasts ===
Year	Title	Voice role	Notes
2021	StarTripper!!	Dennek Dax	Episode: "013: The DaxxyCo Gig"
