= Avatar: The Last Airbender – The Burning Earth =

2007 video game

- Developers: THQ Studio Australia; Tose (DS); Halfbrick (GBA)
- Publisher: THQ
- Composers: Daniel Fournier; Jesse Higginson (GBA)
- Platforms: Nintendo DS, PlayStation 2, Wii, Game Boy Advance, Xbox 360
- Release: DS, PlayStation 2, Wii: NA: October 17, 2007; EU: October 26, 2007; AU: November 1, 2007; Game Boy Advance: NA: October 17, 2007; PAL: 2007; Xbox 360: NA: November 12, 2007; EU: November 16, 2007; AU: November 29, 2007
- Genre: Action-adventure
- Modes: Single-player, multiplayer

Avatar: The Last Airbender – The Burning Earth (known as Avatar: The Legend of Aang – The Burning Earth in Europe) is a 2007 video game for Game Boy Advance, Nintendo DS, PlayStation 2, Wii, and Xbox 360 based on the animated television series Avatar: The Last Airbender. It was one of the last games released for the Game Boy Advance in North America and Europe. It is the sequel to the 2006 game Avatar: The Last Airbender. The game was followed by a sequel, Avatar: The Last Airbender – Into the Inferno, in 2008.

The Xbox 360 version is known for the ease with which the full 1000 Gamerscore points can be unlocked in under five minutes.

== Plot ==
The Burning Earth is based on the second season, Book 2: Earth, of the television series. The game begins with Team Avatar arriving at an Earth Kingdom base where they confront General Fong, who seeks to trigger Aang's Avatar State to overthrow the Fire Nation. After defeating Fong's forces, Aang enters the Avatar State to stop him. The team then heads to the Earth Kingdom city of Omashu, where they face a Fire Nation flag and discover the city renamed New Ozai. They rescue Appa and head to Earth Rumble VI, where Aang competes and identifies Toph as his future earthbending teacher. They later explore a swamp and receive visions, encounter the Blind Bandit at Earth Rumble VI, and convince her, Toph, to teach Aang earthbending. The gang investigates a library for Fire Nation plans, confronts the Dai Li, and frees Appa from Lake Laogai. They warn the Earth King of an upcoming drill attack and ultimately sabotage it with a battle against Azula and Zuko. The game concludes with Azula plotting her revenge.

== Marketing and release ==
A demo was displayed at the 2007 San Diego Comic-Con by THQ, with a release for the Xbox 360, PlayStation 2, Wii, Nintendo DS, and Game Boy Advance scheduled for that fall.

== Reception ==
Reception

Aggregate score
| Aggregator | Score | | | |
| Aggregator | DS | PS2 | Wii | Xbox 360 |
|---|---|---|---|---|
| Metacritic | 64/100 | 52/100 | 58/100 | 54/100 |

Review scores
| Publication | Score | | | |
| Publication | DS | PS2 | Wii | Xbox 360 |
|---|---|---|---|---|
| GameDaily | N/A | N/A | N/A | 4/10 |
| GameZone | 6.6/10 | 6.5/10 | 6.7/10 | 4.5/10 |
| IGN | 6.5/10 | N/A | 6.2/10 | N/A |
| PALGN | 6.5/10 | N/A | N/A | N/A |

Avatar: The Last Airbender – The Burning Earth received "mixed or average" reviews across all platforms according to review aggregator Metacritic.
