= Sokka =

Character in Avatar: The Last Airbender and The Legend of Korra

- Avatar Legends character
- Sokka in Avatar: The Last Airbender.
- First appearance: Original series: "The Boy in the Iceberg" (2005); The Legend of Korra: "The Voice in the Night" (2012); Live-action series: "Aang" (2024)
- Last appearance: Original series: "Avatar Aang: The Last Airbender" (2026); The Legend of Korra: "Out of the Past" (2012)
- Created by: Michael Dante DiMartino; Bryan Konietzko
- Voiced by: Jack DeSena (Avatar: The Last Airbender); Chris Hardwick (The Legend of Korra); Román Zaragoza (Avatar Aang: The Last Airbender); Alex Felten (Quest for Balance); Mark Allen Jr. (2025–present; video games)
- Portrayed by: Jackson Rathbone (2010 film); Ian Ousley (2024 television series)

In-universe information
- Full name: Sokka
- Gender: Male
- Weapon: Boomerang; Space sword
- Family: Hakoda (father); Kya (mother; deceased); Aang (brother-in-law); Katara (sister); Bumi (nephew); Kya (niece); Tenzin (nephew)
- Significant others: Suki (girlfriend); Princess Yue (formerly)
- Nationality: Southern Water Tribe

Sokka (Chinese: 索卡; pinyin: Suǒqiǎ) is a fictional character in Nickelodeon's animated television series Avatar: The Last Airbender and its sequel series The Legend of Korra, and is part of the Avatar: The Last Airbender world. The character, created by Michael Dante DiMartino and Bryan Konietzko, is voiced by Jack DeSena in the original series and by Chris Hardwick in the sequel series. He is a warrior of the Water Tribe and the son of Chief Hakoda and Kya. In the live-action film adaptation, he is portrayed by Jackson Rathbone, while in the live-action television series adaptation, he is portrayed by Ian Ousley.

In the original series, fifteen-year-old Sokka is a warrior of the Southern Water Tribe, a nation where some people are able to telekinetically manipulate, or "bend", water. He, along with his younger sister Katara, discovers an Airbender named Aang, the long-lost Avatar, and accompanies him to defeat the imperialistic Fire Nation and bring peace to the war-torn nations. Unlike his companions, Sokka is a non-bender, but as the show progresses, he masters swordplay and proves himself to be a worthy and intelligent strategist. Being a non-bender, Sokka uses different weapons such as his boomerang and machete; and eventually a jian sword to combat enemies.

== Conception and creation ==
In the Avatar Nick Mag Presents: First Edition issue by co-creators Michael Dante DiMartino and Bryan Konietzko, stated that Sokka was originally designed as a minor figure, but when his comedian voice actor Jack DeSena brought liveliness to his character, they began to emphasize this quality.

As a result of his design, Sokka's character is a source of comic relief throughout the series, often a victim of visual comedy. Among various running gags involving Sokka are his immersion in viscous substances, such as raw sewage, slurry, phlegm, prickly pear cactus juice, or saliva; and forgetting that Toph is blind. Sokka also has a tendency to produce or at times laugh at jokes shared by no other character.

In "Tales of Ba Sing Se", Sokka's name was written as 索卡, whereof Suǒ (索) means 'to search', 'to demand', 'to ask', 'exact', or 'isolated' and Kǎ (卡) means 'to check', to block', or 'card'. The character for Kǎ also appears in Katara's name.

== Personality ==
According to his sister Katara, Sokka was initially skeptical, abrasive, sexist, and immature but was always sharp-witted. Incapable of bending abilities himself, Sokka instead pursues martial arts, sciences, and engineering. He is intelligent, resourceful, and at times he even proves to be quite scholarly. Sokka’s father, the chief of the southern water tribe, was absent for much of his childhood, which left Sokka with a sense of responsibility and a desire to prove himself. However, he is often clumsy and sometimes mistaken. Despite his flaws, he is loving, brotherly, and protective. He holds little interest in the mysticism of bending and prefers to rely on his strength and wits. He tends to be rash, and his arrogance often leads to embarrassment, as during a haiku contest when, in his last verse of his song, he included too many syllables. Even though Sokka finds himself a victim of embarrassment, he has the capability to apologize and seek resolution to prevent further moments of embarrassment from occurring. This capability is evident from his sincere apology to the Kyoshi Warriors, an all-female group, for his chauvinistic opinions in the fourth episode of Book One.

As an advocate of human carnivorism, Sokka is the main hunter in the group; often makes dry-witted jokes or abrasive remarks; and accordingly once describes himself as "the meat and sarcasm guy". Once stuck in a pit created by himself (proving Aunt Wu's prediction true), he claims to give up that skill and calls himself the "vegetarian and straight-talk fellow".

Under the guidance of swordmaster Piandao, Sokka displays various unorthodox procedures when undergoing his training; such that Piandao relates that though Sokka's skills were unimpressive, he displayed much creativity, versatility, and intelligence. These traits led Piandao to consider Sokka a worthy swordsman despite his lack of traditional skill, stating that it was Sokka’s creativity and adaptability that truly defined him. As part of his unconventional approach, Sokka substituted traditional calligraphy practice with painting his face and imprinting onto parchment to express his “identity on the page.” As a rule, most or all of the foregoing characteristics appear as sources of comic relief.

After the failure of his Fire Nation invasion plan, Sokka attempted to restore his honor by risking his life to rescue his father from a highly secure prison known as 'the Boiling Rock'.

== Innovations and abilities ==
Unusual for an inhabitant of a mystical world, Sokka prefers mechanistic science and is something of a jack-of-all-trades. He seems naturally adept at creating weapons from any available material and adapting them to various purposes, as when he used optical illusions to help his sister Katara imitate Earthbending. Alongside the Mechanist, Sokka devised a system of control for an experimental hot air balloon and partly began the design of waterbending-powered submarines. Sokka also demonstrated advanced mathematic skills and a talent for geometry towards the end of the series; but is whimsically depicted in the epilogue as a poor artist of human and animal forms.

In addition to his engineering and strategic skills, Sokka shows a remarkable talent for poetry in "The Tales of Ba Sing Se", wherein he competes with a local instructor in a haiku contest, and holds his own at length before mistakenly adding an extra syllable to the end of a haiku. Sokka writes with his right hand, but draws with his left hand, and may therefore be accounted ambidextrous.

As one of the only two non-benders in Aang's group, with the other being Suki, Sokka is often overshadowed by the bending skills of his friends; but his skill in martial arts improves as the series progresses, and it is sometimes he who devises a victorious strategy. Alongside his trademark boomerang, Sokka is shown wielding a club, a machete, a jaw blade, and eventually a black jian sword of meteoric iron capable of cutting through solid metal, identified as his "space sword". Sokka also receives a white lotus Pai Sho piece from his master, the symbol of the secret 'White Lotus' Society notable for disregarding traditional rivalries and hatreds between the nations; although most of the series' protagonists have had in-depth interactions with members of the White Lotus, Sokka is the only one to receive this implied invitation.

== Appearances in other media ==
Sokka's character has appeared in three THQ video games for the show, which are Avatar: The Last Airbender video game, Avatar: The Last Airbender – The Burning Earth and Avatar: The Last Airbender – Into the Inferno. Like Aang, Sokka also appears on some Avatar T-shirts sold by Nick, as well as in Tokyopop's films comic (sometimes referred to as cine-manga).

=== Film ===
Sokka was played by Jackson Rathbone in the live-action adaptation The Last Airbender. His name in the film is pronounced "SOH-kuh". Unlike the show, this version of Sokka has a serious demeanor, with most of his immature and humorous qualities either toned down or removed entirely. Significant criticism was pointed at the character difference. Rathbone received the Golden Raspberry Award for Worst Supporting Actor for his role in the film.

=== Remake ===
Sokka is played by Ian Ousley in the Netflix remake. Unlike the show and film, this version of Sokka toned down his sexism, which contributed to his character development.

== Family tree ==
Water Tribe–Air Nomad family trees

Hakoda's father	Kanna	Pakku
Hakoda	Kya	Avatar Cycle (Note: Aang and Korra are both parts of Avatar Cycle of reincarnation, with Korra immediately following Aang.)
Sokka	Katara	Avatar Aang	Korra's grandparents
Bumi	Kya	Pema	Tenzin	Senna	Tonraq	Unalaq	Malina
Jinora	Ikki	Meelo	Rohan	Avatar Korra	Desna	Eska

Color key:
Color	Description
	Water Tribe and Waterbenders
	Air Nomads, Air Acolytes, and Airbenders
