= Toph Beifong =

Fictional character in Avatar: The Last Airbender

- Avatar Legends character
- Toph Beifong in Avatar: The Last Airbender.
- First appearance: Original series: "The Blind Bandit" (2006) (Note: Prior to her first full appearance in "The Blind Bandit", Toph appears to Aang in a vision in "The Swamp".); The Legend of Korra: "The Voice in the Night" (2012)
- Last appearance: Original series: "Avatar Aang: The Last Airbender" (2026); The Legend of Korra: "Operation Beifong" (2014)
- Created by: Aaron Ehasz; Michael Dante DiMartino; Bryan Konietzko
- Voiced by: Michaela Jill Murphy (2006–2011); Kate Higgins and Philece Sampler (The Legend of Korra); Dionne Quan (Avatar Aang: The Last Airbender) Julia Gu (Smite) Vivian Vencer (2022–present; video games)
- Portrayed by: Miyako (2024 television series)

In-universe information
- Gender: Female
- Children: Lin Beifong (older daughter); Suyin Beifong (younger daughter)
- Nationality: Earth Kingdom
- Bending element: Earthbending; metalbending
- Age: 12 in Avatar: The Last Airbender; 13–14 in Avatar comics 82 in The Legend of Korra and its comics

Toph Beifong (Chinese: 北方拓芙; pinyin: Běifāng Tuòfú) is a fictional character in Nickelodeon's animated television series Avatar: The Last Airbender and The Legend of Korra, and is part of the Avatar: The Last Airbender world. She is voiced by Michaela Jill Murphy in the original series and Kate Higgins as an adult and Philece Sampler as an elder in the sequel series. She is portrayed by Miyako in the second season of the live-action television series adaptation.

Toph is recognized as a prodigy of earthbending, which is the ability to telekinetically manipulate, reshape, and control stone, sand, dirt, and, later, metal. Because she was born blind, and her parents believed that her condition limited her capacity to learn and use the skill safely, they had a tutor teach her only basic earthbending. Unbeknownst to her family, she once ran away from home when she was younger, and had learned advanced earthbending from the badgermoles (fictional blind creatures that naturally earthbend), including the ability to use her earthbending to scan the environment around her, essentially allowing her to “see” the world and eliminating the challenges her blindness presents. She eventually becomes the first person to develop the ability to "bend" metal as well (known in the avatar world as metalbending).

Toph was introduced in the second season of Avatar. She travels with the protagonist Aang as his earthbending teacher, shown to have an abrasive, conceited, pragmatic, and sometimes stubborn personality which leads to clashes with her peers. Toph proves herself a steadfast ally to Avatar Aang and eventually Avatar Korra. As a breakout character, the character has received universal acclaim, quickly becoming a fan favorite.

== Character overview ==
=== Creation and conception ===
Toph was initially conceived as a sixteen-year-old boy who was athletic and muscular, designed to be a foil to Sokka. Her prototype design is featured in the show's intro as the earthbender. As the series progressed and the time came closer to introduce an earthbender who would join the main characters, head writer Aaron Ehasz suggested that they create contrast by designing a little girl who is able to defeat strong, adult earthbenders; some of the staff found this humorous, but it was initially rejected by Avatar co-creator Bryan Konietzko. Following several long discussions, Konietzko stopped fighting the idea and warmed up to it, after which Toph was made female and introduced into the series, becoming one of Konietzko's favorite characters. The character's original design was recycled into the appearances of minor characters The Boulder and Sud. Her original design greatly influenced the appearance of Bolin in The Legend of Korra. Her Earth Rumble outfit, the clothing she wears for the majority of Avatar: The Last Airbender, was inspired by European fashion styles. Her fancy dress was modeled after the traditional clothing of the Chinese Tang dynasty.

Toph uses a unique fighting style of earthbending, based on the Southern Praying Mantis style.

Toph was favored by the creators to return in The Legend of Korra after the appearances of both Katara and Zuko, DiMartino writing that it "never quite made sense" for there to be a trip to the swamp, where she was located, during the third season. In the following season, she was meant to serve as a foil to Korra with her "gruff mentoring style" contrasting the reserved Korra. Her design became a subject of difficulty for the staff, who wanted her to return to the size of her twelve-year-old self from the original series despite flashbacks in the earlier part of The Legend of Korra showing her as having grown in height. Konietzko was content with the staff's wishes but wanted her shortened height to come from her having become hunched since then. Artists had issues carrying out this design, resulting in multiple takes.

=== Personality and characteristics ===
Toph is fiercely independent, direct, belligerent, and practiced in taunting and insulting her opponents and on occasion her friends, particularly Sokka. On several occasions Toph appears picking her nose, spitting, and belching loudly. As she explained to Aang and his companions, she does this intentionally as a rebellion against the principles of refined culture that her aristocratic parents attempted to make her conform to. If the situation absolutely requires it, she actually knows how to behave in upper-class Earth Kingdom culture much better than Aang's companions do. She is usually covered in dirt, or as she calls it, "a healthy coating of earth".

In her advanced age, despite retaining much of her strength as an earthbender, Toph refuses to take part in prolonged conflicts, admitting that she is too old and lacks the energy for such endeavors.

=== Name ===
In "The Serpent's Pass", Toph's passport reads 土國頭等護照北方拓芙 (tǔ guó tóu děng hù zhào běi fāng tuò fú), which translates as "Earth Kingdom First Class Passport: Beifong Toph". Here, her name means "supported lotus", which matches her parents' view of their daughter as a flower in need of protection. In "Tales of Ba Sing Se", her name is written as 托夫 (Tuō Fū), which is the phonetic transcription based on the official guide for foreign names. In "The Earth King", her name is reverted to 拓芙. Her last name Beifong (北方) is close to the Mandarin pronunciation of the word "North" (běi fāng). The word 托 (Tuō) also means "to support in one's palm", or "drag" and is the word used for child care, and is also intended to sound like the English word "tough" and "toff".

== Appearances ==
=== Avatar: The Last Airbender television series ===
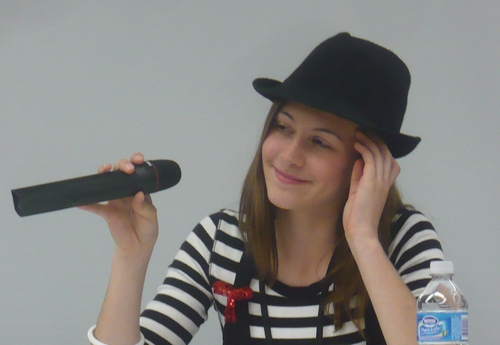
Michaela Jill Murphy voices the young Toph in Avatar: The Last Airbender.

==== Book Two: Earth ====
Toph's parents view her blindness as a disability and therefore keep her concealed. Despite her handicap, Toph has developed special skills by keeping company with the blind 'badgermoles' that inhabited nearby caves. By imitating their movements, Toph became a master of the martial art known as 'earthbending', but she kept her ability secret from her overprotective family. Toph fought frequently in Earth Rumble, an earthbending lei tai tournament resembling professional wrestling, under the alias "Blind Bandit". By the time Aang and his friends discover Toph at the tournament, she had become champion, holding a 42–0 win–loss record. However, Aang unintentionally beats her in a match when he tries to talk to her, as she could not sense air currents. When her parents learn about this and confine her further, Toph runs away to accompany Aang and his friends as Aang's earthbending instructor, although her parents believe she was kidnapped by Aang. Toph nearly leaves the group after feuding with Katara over not contributing to the group's teamwork, though rejoins them following a meeting with Iroh and encountering Princess Azula for the first time. Toph successfully begins Aang's training of earthbending and slows the descent of Wan Shi Tong's Library, where the group learns the date of the next Day of Black Sun and inadvertently gains an advantage over the Fire Nation, as it sinks, though fails to prevent Appa from being kidnapped by sandbenders. Due to Appa being the group's transportation, they are forced to travel on foot, journeying through Serpent's Pass and preventing a drill from entering Ba Sing Se. Now in the city, she infiltrates the Earth Kingdom Royal Palace, meeting Dai Li, bonds with Katara, encounters Jet and reunites with Appa. Toph also learns to metalbend after she is captured in a metal cage by people who were sent by her parents to retrieve her. She realizes that metal contains small amounts of earth, which she can manipulate. She quickly escapes and traps her captors in the same small cage.

==== Book Three: Fire ====
After the events of the Book 2 finale, Toph, alongside Sokka, Katara and the Southern Water Tribe, captured a Fire Nation ship. Once in the Fire Nation, she assumed the identity of a regular Fire Nation girl. In "The Runaway", Toph uses her earthbending senses to foil a vendor's trick, and by bargaining and continuing to use her senses, she extracts more and more money from him. Katara is distressed by this, and scolds Toph for her immoral behavior, but later enlists her to pull a huge scam. Katara fakes turning Toph over to the police in order to collect the reward money, with the assumption that Toph will metalbend her way out of prison and rejoin her. However, it is revealed that there is no reward money and the cells are made of wood, and Katara is shoved in jail alongside Toph. Aang and Sokka attempt to overtake their adversary Combustion Man, but Katara ends up busting herself and Toph out by being resourceful in her attempt to draw water for her bending. Toph then is part of the invasion team, and she helps Aang get to Firelord Ozai's underground bunker. She later is seen riding on Appa after the invasion team's defeat.

In "The Western Air Temple", she arrives at the Western Air Temple with the Gang and meets Zuko. She is accepting of him at first, urging Katara and Sokka to accept his help, but after she is burned by him, she too grows angry with him. When he reattempts to join their team, she happily accepts him on the grounds of Aang's acceptance. In the finale, Toph helps Sokka and Suki attack a Fire Nation airship. Suki hops off the ship in order to help Toph and Sokka get to safety. Toph is nearly knocked off the burning ship and killed, but Sokka rescues her and they are promptly retrieved by Suki. She later celebrates the Fire Lord's defeat with her friends in Iroh's tea shop.

=== Avatar: The Last Airbender comic series ===
==== The Promise ====
In The Promise trilogy, Toph is revealed to have started the Beifong Metalbending Academy from the ground up, an instructional institution to help earthbenders learn metalbending, shortly after the end of the television series. She chooses her three students (Penga, The Dark One and Ho Tun) on the basis of her meteorite bracelet shivering in their presence. Though claiming her motives behind founding the school were due to her love of metalbending, in actuality, she enjoys bossing people around. Initially worried her students are not capable of being metalbenders, they surprise her with their victory over Kunyo and his firebending students, renewing her confidence in them and she participates in the battle for Yu Dao.

==== The Rift ====
In The Rift trilogy, Toph encounters her father for the first time since the series, though he refuses to acknowledge her as his daughter. It is further revealed that her parents broke up after the people they sent to bring Toph back had failed. Toph prevents the others from being killed by debris falling from the mine collapsing, including her father, who reconciles with her as she saves everyone. Following this, she passes out and has her students assist Aang in his battle against the spirit of Old Iron.

==== Toph Beifong's Metalbending Academy ====
Toph Beifong gets a Metalbending Academy.

=== The Legend of Korra ===
Korra encounters 86-year-old Toph living in the swamp.

==== Book One: Air ====
In The Legend of Korra, Toph is revealed to have founded Republic City's police force and taught the art of metalbending to her students. Two of her students were her daughters Lin and Suyin. Her daughters mention in passing to Korra that they are actually half-sisters by two different fathers, but their identities were not revealed, and due to as-yet-unexplained reasons neither of Toph's daughters ever knew their fathers. Due to her own strict upbringing, Toph raised the pair as a single parent with essentially no restrictions. But it caused both of them to feel that she was ignoring them as their mutual need for her attention caused them to react in different ways: the older and strict Lin followed in her mother's footsteps as a Republic City police officer while the free-spirited Suyin became a delinquent by hanging with the wrong crowd, which Lin disapproved of. Eventually, Lin caught Suyin driving the getaway car for her criminal friends after a jewel theft, during which Suyin accidentally scarred the right side of Lin's face. Although upset with her daughters for putting her in a tough situation, Toph was forced to look the other way and tear up the police report because of the controversy it would cause before sending Suyin away to live with her grandparents; Lin did not take this kindly. This ignites a rift between Toph and her daughters. Toph, feeling guilt over her questionable actions, retired the following year with Lin eventually succeeding her as Republic City's Chief of Police by the time of the first season.

==== Book Three: Change ====
In the third-season episodes, "The Metal Clan" and "Old Wounds", it is revealed that Toph made her peace with a repentant Suyin and spent some years living with Suyin's family in Zaofu, a city of creative metalbenders founded by Suyin, which recognized Toph as the inventor of metalbending. A statue of her was built to honor her discovery. Some years prior to the events of the series, Toph left Zaofu to travel the world in search of enlightenment and had not been seen or heard from since.

==== Book Four: Balance ====
Toph appears in the fourth-season episode "Korra Alone", having made a home in the sacred spirit wilds of the Foggy Swamp where Aang's reincarnation, Korra, encounters her. In the episodes "The Coronation" and "The Calling", she assists Korra by removing the remnant liquid-metal poison placed in her body by the Red Lotus through helping her overcome her fears brought about by her past adversaries. Toph returns in the tenth episode, "Operation: Beifong", to aid Lin, her granddaughter Opal and Bolin, in freeing Suyin and her family from Kuvira's Earth Empire forces. She reveals that Lin's father was named Kanto, a nice man whose relationship with Toph didn't work out.

=== Graphic novels ===
Eighty-five-year-old Toph returns in "Ruins of the Empire, Part 2" upon being approached by Korra and Earth King Wu, requesting her assistance in stopping those who desired to further strengthen the Earth Empire's influence by becoming governor in the election, to which the elderly earthbending master and metalbending founder was not interested in.

=== Live action TV series ===
Toph appears in second season of the live-action adaptation Avatar: The Last Airbender, portrayed by Miyako.

== Abilities ==
=== Heightened senses ===
An illustration of Toph's mechanoreceptor ability to feel minute seismic vibrations through the ground, similar to sonar.

Being blind, Toph's mechanoreceptors and other senses are hyper-sensitive. By grounding herself barefoot, Toph can "see" and "feel" even the most minute seismic vibrations in the earth, be it the presence of trees or the march of ants several meters away, an earthbending technique dubbed the "seismic sense". Toph has acquired an acute sense of hearing, enabling her to recognize people by their voices, discern a person's physical appearance by sound, overhear distant conversations, and sense falsehood via the individual's subtle breathing patterns, heartbeat, and physical reactions. After taking residence in the Foggy Swamp, Toph claimed her heightened senses has expanded to the point of being fine-tuned via the spirit vines with events around the world.

Toph is disadvantaged against opponents who require minimal contact with the ground and vulnerable to any attacks initiated in mid-air. Terrain that impairs Toph's ability to sense vibrations also hinders her abilities; she has some difficulty with sand, which constantly lacks solidity, preventing her from accurately "feeling" her surroundings. Because Toph relies on sensation in her feet to perform earthbending, she becomes truly "blind" if the soles of her feet are damaged, as shown when Zuko accidentally burns her feet. Although, she can feel the vibrations of the earth with her hands to some degree, they are not nearly as sensitive as her feet. Her affinity with the earth is further illustrated in that Toph does not know how to swim and expresses an aversion to flying.

=== Earthbending ===
"Earthbending is the element of substance. The key to Earthbending is your stance – you've gotta be steady and strong. Rock is a stubborn element. Unyielding. If you're going to move it, you've gotta be like a rock yourself."

— Toph Beifong (Avatar: The Last Airbender)

Toph is highly skilled in earthbending which utilizes Chinese martial arts techniques of Hóng Quán and Chu Gar Nán Pài Tángláng. Earthbending represents the element of substance. It is categorized as the most diverse and enduring of the "four bending arts". Earthbending is the geokinetic ability to manipulate earth, rock, sand, lava, and metals in all their various forms. Earthbending utilizes neutral jing, which involves waiting and listening for the right moment to act decisively. Earthbending involves enduring attacks until the right opportunity to counterattack reveals itself, emphasizes "heavily rooted stances and strong blows that evoke the mass and power of earth", and demands precise stepping footwork to maintain constant contact with the ground. Earthbending parallels Five Animals movements (such as the tiger's hard blows and the crane's affinity to landing gracefully). Earthbending is at its strongest when the feet or hand are in direct contact with the ground, enabling earthbenders to transfer their kinetic energies into their bending for fast and powerful moves. This reliance on direct contact with the earth is a figurative Achilles' heel; separating earthbenders from any contact with the earth renders them ineffective.

==== Neutral Jing ====
The series' creators consulted a professional martial artist in the design of the show's fighting style. The primary concepts in Earthbending (i.e. listening, reacting, balancing attacks and defense) and drawing power from a stable lower body are referred to in the practice of neutral jing. The concept of neutral jing relates to the philosophy of "sticky hands". The purpose of sticky hands is to enable the practitioner to predict their opponent's next move. Similar to Toph detecting the movements of others through her connection with earth, a practitioner learns to detect their opponent's upcoming move by maintaining constant contact between their own arms, hands or wrists, and their foe's arm. By practicing with a partner in this manner, a practitioner learns to "read" the slight movements of their opponent's arms to detect their next attack and subsequently move accordingly to neutralize it.

==== Metalbending ====
Throughout Avatar: The Last Airbender, Toph is the first earthbender known to bend metal. When Toph is imprisoned in iron, the sadhu Guru Pathik explains to Aang in a parallel scene that metal is refined earth; whereupon Toph locates the iron's impurities and manipulates them to "bend" the metal portion. She practices and hones her initially unique skill throughout the rest of the series, later teaching it to other earthbenders prior to the events of the Legend of Korra.

== Reception ==
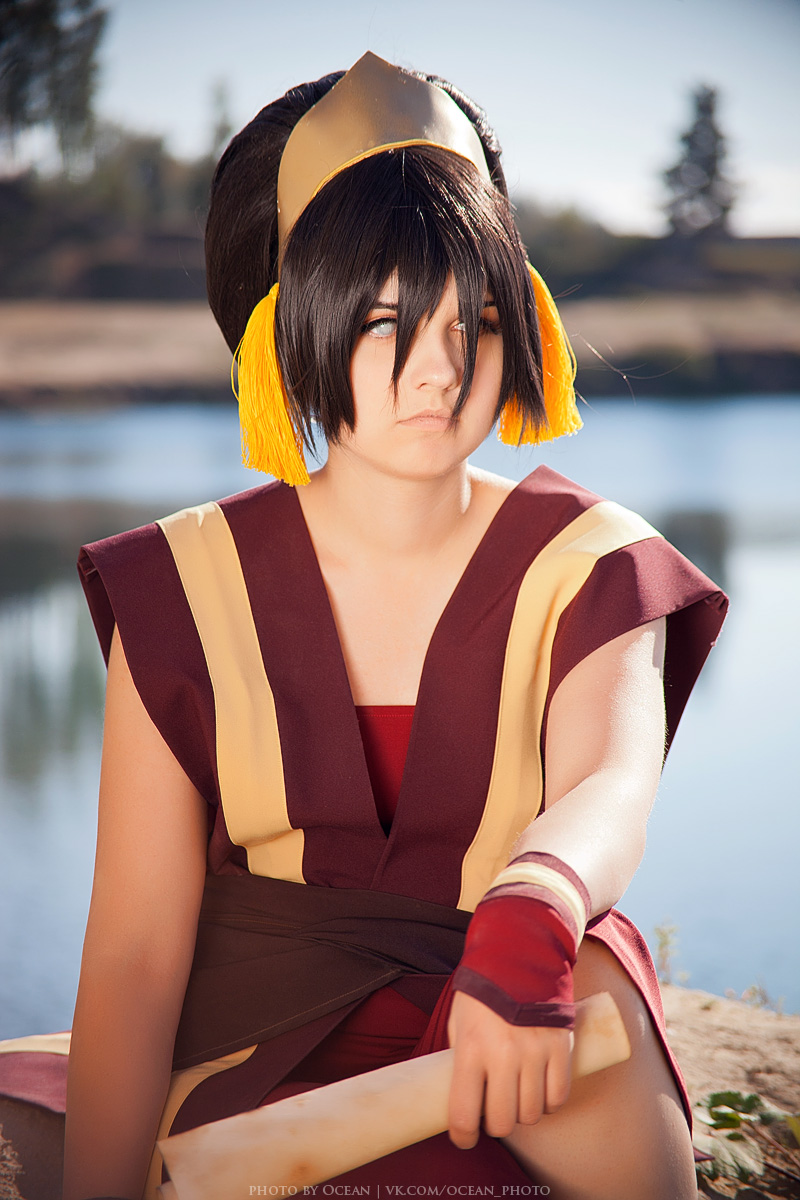
Cosplay of Toph

Reviewer Michael Mammano loved that while Toph "never loses her rough edge, she's always been deftly humanized", feeling her relationships with her daughters would matter to her and thought it was "incredibly refreshing and feminist" that she had two children with different men because nowhere in the narrative was Toph "questioned or shamed for having children out of wedlock", adding: "She has been canonically confirmed as a woman who had a sex life that was on her terms." Mammano braced for her to die in The Legend of Korra episode "Operation: Beifong", though she survived and felt that as her final appearance in the series, "it was a great send-off, especially given her parting words." Toph's character was viewed as being "ruined" due to her poor parenting in the eyes of her daughter Lin in The Legend of Korra. Mammano objected to this by reasoning that the story is told from the perspective of her children while she was no longer around to defend herself, with and that grown children would never be able to fully understand their parents' rationale for raising them the way they did.

== Family tree ==
Beifong family tree

Lao Beifong	Poppy Beifong
Kanto	Toph Beifong	Suyin's father
Lin Beifong	Suyin Beifong	Baatar
Kuvira (Note: In Ruins of the Empire (2019–2020), Kuvira is shown to have been taken in as a child by Suyin Beifong, after being abandoned by her birth parents.)	Baatar Jr.	Huan	Opal	Wei	Wing
