= Avatar: The Last Airbender (comics) =

American comic book series

- The Promise (first Avatar: The Last Airbender comic trilogy) hardcover collection
- Created by: Michael Dante DiMartino; Bryan Konietzko

Publication information
Title(s)
- The Lost Adventures (2011)
- The Promise (3 parts, 2012)
- The Search (3 parts, 2013)
- The Rift (3 parts, 2014)
- Smoke and Shadow (3 parts, 2015–16)
- North and South (3 parts, 2016–17)
- Imbalance (3 parts, 2018–19)
- Team Avatar Tales (2019)
- Formats: Series of original graphic novels
- Genre: Fantasy, adventure
- Publication date: June 2005 – present
- Main character(s): Aang; Zuko; Katara; Toph Beifong; Sokka

Creative team
- Writer(s): Gene Luen Yang; Faith Erin Hicks; Michael Dante DiMartino; Bryan Konietzko; Tim Hedrick
- Artist(s): Gurihiru; Peter Wartman
- Letterer(s): Michael Heisler; Richard Starkings; Jimmy Betancourt
- Colorist(s): Naoko Kawano; Ryan Hill; Adele Matera
- Editor(s): Dave Marshall; Rachel Roberts

The Avatar: The Last Airbender comics are an official continuation of the original Nickelodeon animated television series, Avatar: The Last Airbender, created by Michael Dante DiMartino and Bryan Konietzko. The series includes The Lost Adventures, published from 2005 to 2011 and set between episodes of the original series, and the graphic novel trilogies, published since 2012 and set a few years after the original series. A related comic continuation, taking place seven decades later, The Legend of Korra, began publication in 2017.

== Short stories ==
=== Free Comic Book Day issues ===
Since 2011, there have been eight short comics of Avatar: The Last Airbender or The Legend of Korra at Free Comic Book Day offerings from Dark Horse Comics.

Title	Date	Story	Art	Colors	FCBD issue
"Relics"	7 May 2011	Johane Matte; Joshua Hamilton	Johane Matte	Hye Jung Kim	Avatar: The Last Airbender / Star Wars: The Clone Wars
"Rebound"	4 May 2013	Gene Luen Yang	Ryan Hill		Star Wars / Captain Midnight / Avatar: The Last Airbender
"Shells"	3 May 2014	Gene Luen Yang	Faith Erin Hicks	Cris Peter	Avatar: The Last Airbender / Itty Bitty Hellboy / Juice Squeezers
"Sisters"	2 May 2015	Gene Luen Yang	Carla Speed McNeil	Jenn Manley Lee	Avatar: The Last Airbender / Plants vs. Zombies / Bandette
"Matcha Makers"	14 August 2021	Nadia Shammas	Sarah Alfageeh	Savanna Ganucheau	Avatar: The Last Airbender / The Legend of Korra
"Aang's Unfreezing Day" (preview)	7 May 2022	Kelly Leigh Miller	Diana Sim with Christianne Gillenardo-Goudreau	Michael Atuyeh	Avatar: The Last Airbender / The Legend of Korra
"Lost and Found"	6 May 2023	Amy Chu	Kelly Matthews with Nichole Matthews		Star Wars: The High Republic Adventures / Avatar: The Last Airbender
”Ramen Rumble”	3 May 2025	Brandon Hoang	Bell Bessa	C.E. Chant	Star Wars: Young Jedi Adventures / Avatar: The Last Airbender

=== Comics Giveaway Day issues ===
In 2026, Dark Horse began participating in Comics Giveaway Day instead of Free Comic Book Day. As of September 2026, there has been one Avatar: The Last Airbender short story released for Comics Giveaway Day.

Title	Date	Story	Art	Colors	CGD issue
"Earth and Water"	2 May 2026	David M. Booher	Bailie Rosenlund	Cris Peter	Avatar Legends / Minecraft: Heart of Cobblestone

=== The Lost Adventures ===
The Avatar: The Last Airbender – The Lost Adventures graphic novel is a collection of comics previously published in Nickelodeon Magazine and the Avatar: The Last Airbender DVD collections between 2005 and 2011. It also includes the Free Comic Book Day issue "Relics" and all-new comics. Published 15 June 2011, it is an anthology that includes twenty-eight stories by various writers and artists, many of whom worked on the original animated series.

=== Team Avatar Tales ===
Avatar: The Last Airbender – Team Avatar Tales is the second anthology book, collecting the 2013–2015 Free Comic Book Day stories along with all-new stories. The book was released on 2 October 2019. Creators include Gene Luen Yang, Dave Scheidt, Sara Goetter, Ron Koertge, Kiku Hughes, Faith Erin Hicks, Ryan Hill, Carla Speed McNeil, Little Corvus, and Coni Yovaniniz.

=== Avatar Legends: Masters of the Elements ===
Avatar Legends: Masters of the Elements was released on 25 August 2026. It collects the Avatar: The Last Airbender FCBD stories Lost and Found and Ramen Rumble, the Avatar: The Last Airbender CGD story Earth and Water, the The Legend of Korra FCBD story Beach Wars, and multiple new stories.

== Graphic novels ==
Dark Horse Comics published a series of graphic novels that serve as a continuation of Avatar: The Last Airbender television series. It consists of trilogies and stand-alone graphic novels. The first five stories are written by Gene Luen Yang and drawn by artist team Gurihiru. In December 2018, Faith Erin Hicks took over as writer with Peter Wartman as artist.

Episode	Title	Date	Story	Script	Art	Colors	Notes
62	The Promise	26 January 2012	Michael Dante DiMartino; Bryan Konietzko; Gene Luen Yang	Gene Luen Yang	Gurihiru		
62	The Promise	30 May 2012	Michael Dante DiMartino; Bryan Konietzko; Gene Luen Yang	Gene Luen Yang	Gurihiru		
62	The Promise	26 September 2012	Michael Dante DiMartino; Bryan Konietzko; Gene Luen Yang	Gene Luen Yang	Gurihiru		
63	The Search	20 March 2013	Michael Dante DiMartino; Bryan Konietzko; Gene Luen Yang	Gene Luen Yang	Gurihiru		
63	The Search	10 July 2013	Michael Dante DiMartino; Bryan Konietzko; Gene Luen Yang	Gene Luen Yang	Gurihiru		
63	The Search	30 October 2013	Michael Dante DiMartino; Bryan Konietzko; Gene Luen Yang	Gene Luen Yang	Gurihiru		
64	The Rift	5 March 2014	Michael Dante DiMartino; Bryan Konietzko; Gene Luen Yang	Gene Luen Yang	Gurihiru		
64	The Rift	16 July 2014	Michael Dante DiMartino; Bryan Konietzko; Gene Luen Yang	Gene Luen Yang	Gurihiru		
64	The Rift	18 November 2014	Michael Dante DiMartino; Bryan Konietzko; Gene Luen Yang	Gene Luen Yang	Gurihiru		
65	Smoke and Shadow	6 October 2015	Michael Dante DiMartino; Bryan Konietzko; Gene Luen Yang	Gene Luen Yang	Gurihiru		
65	Smoke and Shadow	29 December 2015	Michael Dante DiMartino; Bryan Konietzko; Gene Luen Yang	Gene Luen Yang	Gurihiru		
65	Smoke and Shadow	12 April 2016	Michael Dante DiMartino; Bryan Konietzko; Gene Luen Yang	Gene Luen Yang	Gurihiru		
66	North and South	28 September 2016	Michael Dante DiMartino; Bryan Konietzko; Gene Luen Yang	Gene Luen Yang	Gurihiru		
66	North and South	25 January 2017	Michael Dante DiMartino; Bryan Konietzko; Gene Luen Yang	Gene Luen Yang	Gurihiru		
66	North and South	26 April 2017	Michael Dante DiMartino; Bryan Konietzko; Gene Luen Yang	Gene Luen Yang	Gurihiru		
67	Imbalance	18 December 2018	Michael Dante DiMartino; Bryan Konietzko; Faith Erin Hicks	Faith Erin Hicks	Peter Wartman	Ryan Hill	
67	Imbalance	14 May 2019	Michael Dante DiMartino; Bryan Konietzko; Faith Erin Hicks	Faith Erin Hicks	Peter Wartman	Adele Matera	
67	Imbalance	1 October 2019	Michael Dante DiMartino; Bryan Konietzko; Faith Erin Hicks	Faith Erin Hicks	Peter Wartman	Adele Matera	
29.5	Katara and the Pirate's Silver	13 October 2020	Faith Erin Hicks; Tim Hedrick	Faith Erin Hicks	Peter Wartman	Adele Matera	
64.5	Toph Beifong's Metalbending Academy	16 February 2021	Faith Erin Hicks		Peter Wartman	Adele Matera	
53.5	Suki, Alone	27 July 2021	Faith Erin Hicks		Peter Wartman	Adele Matera	
65.5	Azula in the Spirit Temple	1 November 2023	Faith Erin Hicks		Peter Wartman	Adele Matera	
63.5	The Bounty Hunter and the Tea Brewer	20 August 2024	Michael Dante DiMartino; Bryan Konietzko; Faith Erin Hicks	Faith Erin Hicks	Peter Wartman	Adele Matera	
66.5	Ashes of the Academy	25 March 2025	Michael Dante DiMartino; Bryan Konietzko; Faith Erin Hicks	Faith Erin Hicks	Peter Wartman	Adele Matera	
10.5	Jet: Rebels and Rhinos	8 September 2026	Michael Dante DiMartino; Bryan Konietzko; Faith Erin Hicks	Faith Erin Hicks	Peter Wartman	Adele Matera	
4.5–31.5	The Kyoshi Warriors	6 May 2026	Brandon Hoang		BellBessa	Adele Matera	
4.5–31.5	The Kyoshi Warriors	17 June 2026	Brandon Hoang		BellBessa	Adele Matera	
4.5–31.5	The Kyoshi Warriors	15 July 2026	Brandon Hoang		BellBessa	Adele Matera	
13.5	Enter the Blue Spirit	23 February 2027	Faith Erin Hicks		Peter Wartman	Adele Matera	

=== Avatar: The Last Airbender Chibis ===
Avatar: The Last Airbender Chibis is a series of graphic novels featuring chibi-style versions of Avatar: The Last Airbender characters. As of September 2026, two volumes have been released, both by Dark Horse Comics. As noted earlier in this article, a preview of Aang's Unfreezing Day was the 2022 Free Comic Book Day release for Avatar: The Last Airbender.

Volume	Title	Date	Story	Art	Colors
1	Aang's Unfreezing Day	4 April 2023	Kelly Leigh Miller	Diana Sim; Christianne Gillenardo-Goudreau	Michael Atiyeh
2	Sokka's Boomerang Class	28 July 2026	Kelly Leigh Miller	Ruka Ito	

== Collections ==
The stories are collected in oversized hardcover library edition featuring notes from the creators and a sketchbook section. They are also collected in paperback omnibuses, printed at digest size.

Volume	Title	Date	Collects	ISBN	Notes
1	The Promise	20 February 2013 (LE); 30 June 2020 (Omni)	The Promise 1–3	9781616550745 (LE); 9781506717845 (Omni)	
2	The Search	5 February 2014 (LE); 27 October 2020 (Omni)	The Search 1–3	9781616552268 (LE); 9781506721729 (Omni)	
3	The Rift	24 February 2015 (LE); 23 February 2021 (Omni)	The Rift 1–3	9781616555504 (LE); 9781506721712 (Omni)	
4	Smoke and Shadow	21 September 2016 (LE); 5 October 2021 (Omni)	Smoke and Shadow 1–3	9781506700137 (LE); 9781506721682 (Omni)	
5	North and South	25 October 2017 (LE); 22 February 2022 (Omni)	North and South 1–3	9781506701950 (LE); 9781506721675 (Omni)	
6	Imbalance	3 June 2020 (LE); 9 August 2023 (Omni)	Imbalance 1–3	9781506708126 (LE); 9781506733814 (Omni)	
7	The Lost Adventures and Team Avatar Tales	10 November 2020 (LE); 3 June 2025 (Omni)	The Lost Adventures; Team Avatar Tales	9781506722740 (LE); 9781506750507 (Omni)	
8	Team Avatar Treasury	29 October 2024 (LE); 11 November 2025 (Omni)	Katara and the Pirate's Silver; Toph Beifong's Metalbending Academy; Suki, Alone	9781506746753 (LE); 9781506750484 (Omni)	
9	Fire and Family Treasury	9 June 2026 (LE); 1 June 2027 (Omni)	Azula in the Spirit Temple; The Bounty Hunter and the Tea Brewer; Ashes of the Academy	9781506750460 (LE); 9781506757247 (Omni)	

== The Promise ==
=== Plot ===
The Promise is the first comic to continue after the show ended on Nickelodeon and picks up right where the series left off. For example, in the last episode of the series, Katara and Aang start their relationship and The Promise Part One explores their new romance. The comic also explores Toph's metal bending practices and Zuko's reign as Fire Lord. The audience sees more of the dynamic between Avatar Aang and Fire Lord Zuko as they both work with the Earth King over a conflict: the Fire Nation colonies in Earth Kingdom territory. This issue escalates as Yu Dao, one of the Fire Nation colonies, fights against this order.

In The Promise Part Two, Team Avatar begins to try to resolve the Yu Dao issue, while Fire Lord Zuko aims to receive advice from his father who was previously Fire Lord. Zuko experiences an internal war, in which he feels the need to do what is best for the four nations but he fears becoming like his tyrant father. The issue becomes tense as Earth King Kuei and Zuko come closer to war.

In The Promise Part Three, tensions escalate as Zuko and Kuei both aim to keep Yu Dao through military means. As both send their armies to fight, Avatar Aang has to decide what he needs to do to maintain peace between the four nations, even if that means killing Fire Lord Zuko, his best friend.

=== Critical reception ===
In June 2012, The Promise Part Two was a New York Times Bestseller and the top of the BookScan charts. Critics say that this comic is great at displaying the characters authentically and the illustrations are a "great success."

== The Search ==
=== Plot ===
The Search is about Fire Lord Zuko's adventure to find his presumably deceased mother Ursa who left the Fire Nation in order to save his life when he was a child. This comic also includes a large piece of Ursa's life.

In The Search Part One, Zuko makes a deal with his sister Azula: she has to help him find their mother and he releases her from the mental institution. Zuko, Azula and Team Avatar set out to find his mother by going to Hira'a, the town where Ursa grew up.

In The Search, Part Two, Avatar Aang dismisses Fire Lord Zuko's enthusiasm upon finding out Ozai may not be his biological father and expresses his worry that if Ozai is not Zuko's real father then Zuko has no right to the throne. Team Aang, Zuko and Azula continue searching for Ursa and go to Forgetful Valley. Here, Aang meets "The Mother of Faces" in the spirit world.

In The Search, Part Three, Azula finds out important information about Ursa and aims to find her mother herself but Fire Lord Zuko and Sokka try to find Ursa first. Avatar Aang and Katara deal with the "Mother of Faces" and her spirit animals.

=== Critical reception ===
In July 2013, The Search Part Two was a New York Times Bestseller. Critics say that this comic explained the missing pieces about Zuko's mother well, but the story only expanded the narrative with coincidences rather than purpose.

== The Rift ==
=== Plot ===
The Rift mostly revolves around Aang's roots: the Air Nation. This comic also explores Toph's past, specifically her complicated relationship with her father. In The Rift Part One, Aang wants his friends to celebrate Yangchen's festival. This festival was one of the most sacred Air Nomad holidays which Aang never learned much about it because he and Gyatso were flying kites, but was not celebrated in 100 years due to the Air Nomad genocide. Aang meets with Avatar Yangchen and finds out that a jointly owned Fire Nation and Earth Kingdom factory is on Air Nomad sacred land. Toph reunites with her father, whom she had not seen in two years.

In The Rift Part Two, Team Avatar continues to try to save sacred air nomadic land from industrialists. Aang and Avatar Yangchen enter the Spirit World and she speaks about her experience with a man named General Old Iron and his grudge against the city of Boma for the death of Lady Tienhai. As they speak, the place is hit by an Earthquake.

In The Rift Part Three, Aang connects with Avatar Yangchen and learns that the only way to prevent the bitter spirit of General Old Iron to return is to destroy the town. Toph does not agree with this solution, as she respects the refinery's symbol of international cooperation between the Fire and Earth nations. Ultimately, Aang fights General Old Iron and wins. After meeting with Lady Tienhai in the Spirit World, Aang recognizes that spirits deserve to live with human civilization in peace and creates the "Spirits Friendship Festival."

=== Critical reception ===
In March 2014, The Rift Part One was a New York Times Bestseller. Critics say that the message of this comic, that tradition should influence the present, but it should not prohibit progress, is a suitable transition to Avatar: The Legend of Korra.

== Smoke and Shadow ==
=== Plot ===
Smoke and Shadow continues Zuko's and Ursa's relationship where The Search leaves off. This comic also goes further in depth with Zuko's family in general. This comic mostly revolves around Zuko's and Aang's mission to settle both issues in the physical and spiritual world.

In Smoke and Shadow Part One, mysterious figures called the Kemurikage spirits tell a prophecy that Zuko must leave the throne or the Fire Nation will collapse. The New Ozai Society begin to organize a plan to remove Zuko from the throne and children begin to disappear in the Fire Nation Capitol.

In Smoke and Shadow Part Two, Aang and the rest of Team Avatar aim to make sense of the disappearances of the children. The leader of the Kemurikage is revealed to Zuko and Aang as Azula.

In Smoke and Shadow Part Three, Zuko attempts to catch Azula. In doing so, he fights Azula and she tells him that she wants Zuko to be the Fire Lord she wanted to be- one who leads with fear rather than compassion. In this way, she rules through him. Azula and the rest of the Kemurikage disappear in the smoke. Aang and the rest of Team Avatar save the children by fighting the Kemurikage spirits. After the battle, Zuko gives a speech about his failures, and makes a promise to do right. Azula and two other Kemurikage watch, and when Zuko finishes, they vanish. The ending of the comic consists of Ursa meeting Ozai again in his cell, after all these years. Ursa sees her former husband for the man he was, a small man trying to act big.

=== Critical reception ===
In May 2016, Smoke and Shadow Part Three was a New York Times Bestseller. Critics say that this comic was good at portraying Zuko's family with further character development. However, critics also say that some of the themes, like Zuko's insecurity with being Fire Lord, became repetitive.

== North and South ==
=== Plot ===
North and South revolves around Katara and Sokka's roots when they return home to the Southern Water Tribe. In North and South Part One, Katara and Sokka return to their home and are surprised by the flourishing city it has become from the little village where they grew up. They find out that their father, Hakoda, was in charge and Malina, a woman from the Northern Water Tribe, had a huge role in progressing the Southern Water Tribe. By the end of part one, Katara and Sokka walk in on their father and Malina in the middle of a kiss.

In North and South, Part Two, Southern Gilak tries to kidnap Katara and Sokka and leaves a note on Hakoda's door which says, "Soon you will see the truth Chieftain." Katara is suspicious of the integration of the Northern and Southern Water Tribes. Gilak exposes Malina for her integration of both tribes and claims that she only aims to exploit the natural resources of the Southern Water Tribe for the benefit of the Northern Water Tribe. Malina apologizes but Gilak's troops attack her and her brother Maliq. Team Avatar steps in and fights off the troops. Gilak is escorted to his prison cell, but an officer who says she never liked the Northerners gives him the key to his cell.

In North and South, Part Three, Fire Lord Zuko and the Earth King Kuei come to the Southern Water tribe and approve of the full integration of the tribes. Amid this, Gilak breaks free and causes a rebellion. They then kidnap Earth King Kuei, threatening that if Hakoda does not give himself up to Southern justice at the Bridge of No Return, Gilak will kill Earth King Kuei. It breaks out into a fight; Gilak dies and Malina is saved by Katara. Afterwards, Katara goes to her mother Kya's grave and mourns. In the end, kids cook and eat popular food from all four nations of the world with their grandparents.

=== Critical reception ===
Some critics say that North and South was "disappointing" and a "victim of its own making." Other critics say that the antagonist, Gilak, was not nearly as threatening as other villains which made the comic less exciting.

== Imbalance ==
=== Plot ===
Imbalance surrounds the tension between benders and nonbenders at the Earthen Fire Industries. In Imbalance Part One, Team Avatar arrive at the Earthen Fire Industries and to their surprise, they are met with disapproval as there are increased disputes among the benders and the nonbenders. In Imbalance Part Two, Team Avatar aims to solve the conflict between the benders and nonbenders. In Imbalance Part Three, the conflict comes to a climax and it is up to Aang to come up with a solution to satisfy both parties. This comic as a whole sets up the majority of the plot of Avatar: The Legend of Korra as it explores increasing political tension as well as industrialization.

=== Critical reception ===
Critics say that this comic goes slow in the beginning, as it starts off with a broad dispute among benders and nonbenders, but increases pace as the narrative explores the idea of modernization.

== Katara and the Pirate's Silver ==
Released on 13 October 2020, Katara and the Pirate's Silver is the first stand alone graphic novel (as compared to previous graphic novels released as trilogies) from the Avatar Universe. Furthermore, unlike previously released graphic trilogies which were set after the events of the show, Katara and the Pirate's Silver is set during the events of the show.

=== Plot ===
Set in the Avatar universe after the events of the Book Two: Earth episode "Bitter Work", Katara and the Pirate's Silver follows Katara as she gets separated from the rest of Team Avatar while passing through a Fire Nation blockade, Appa accidentally flings Katara from his back in the course of evading Fire Nation launched projectiles. Unable to rendezvous with Aang, Toph, and Sokka, Katara must avoid capture by aligning herself with a band of pirates who offer her passage beyond the blockade. In doing so, Katara is forced to prove that she has the grit and toughness to stand up to anyone.

=== Critical reception ===
The graphic novel was generally well received by critics. Brenton Stewart of Comic Books Resources said that "after being usually relegated to the sidelines, Katara shines as the story's chief protagonist in a long-overdue starring role that's just one of several smart storytelling decisions." He went on to say, "Attachments to the original series aside, the comic is just an enjoyable and fun adventure showcasing Katara's strength and revealing more of the ever-more fascinating world of Avatar as we gain an insight into the life of pirates".

== Toph Beifong's Metalbending Academy ==
=== Plot ===
Released on 17 February 2021, Toph Beifong's Metalbending Academy is a standalone graphic novel set in the Avatar universe after the events of The Rift and before the events of Smoke and Shadow. The graphic novel follows Toph as she settles into an easy life turning Earthbenders into Metalbenders after building up enough infrastructure for her metalbending academy. However, Toph finds the grind tedious, so her former students Penga, Ho Tun and the Dark One help carry her workload and when Sokka and Suki visit to invite Toph to a concert they hope the change may offer her excitement.

== Suki, Alone ==
The third standalone graphic novel from the Avatar universe, Suki, Alone, was released on 27 July 2021. Originally, it was scheduled to be released on 22 June 2021. It follows the story of Suki, the Kyoshi Warrior somewhere between "Appa's Lost Days" and "The Boiling Rock".

=== Plot ===
Suki is captured by the Fire Nation and brought to the Boiling Rock, a high security prison in the middle of a dormant volcano. Separated from Team Avatar and her Kyoshi Warrior sisters, she decides to build her own community among other prisoners. But it's going to take more words to build trust. Suki will need to draw on all her resources to do it.

== Azula in the Spirit Temple ==
During San Diego Comic-Con 2022, it was revealed that a new comic would be slated for the fall of 2023. Faith Erin Hicks would return to write with art by Peter Wartman.

Azula and her newly formed Fire Warriors squad attack a granary in an attempt to cause food shortages and therefore undermine Zuko's leadership. With Ty Lee as one of the guards, they capture a member of the Fire Warriors, but Azula and the others get away and camp in the forest. The other warriors want to rescue their captured friend but Azula considers her a necessary casualty. As she goes to sleep, the other warriors band together and go back to rescue their friend anyway. When Azula wakes up, she walks through the forest to find the warriors who abandoned her and seek revenge, but it gets late and she finds a fire temple as her stomach grumbles. The inn keeper offers her a bed, but unsatisfied with the conditions, she forces the inn keeper to swap with her own bed. Azula dreams about being on Ember Island with her whole family and former friends as everyone tells her how they are proud of her and love her until Mai and Ty Lee switch up. They tell her that this could never be real and Azula wakes up, demanding an explanation from the inn keeper. The inn keeper tells her to leave, but the mist in the forest turns Azula back around and she ends up back at the temple. As the inn keeper slowly transforms into a spirit, apparitions of her mother, Mai, Ty Lee and Zuko torment Azula into admitting that what she wants the most is for everyone to apologize, ask for forgiveness and never betray her again. But when an apparition of Zuko asks her if she will do the same to the people she hurt, she fights back and the spirit turns into a monster, claiming to have turned into a physical representation of Azula's true character. Azula wakes up in the forest where she slept originally. In that moment, the Fire Warriors are returning together with their rescued friend, but Azula walks away on her own, claiming she will find new loyal followers soon enough again.

== The Bounty Hunter and the Tea Brewer ==
This book starts with where we left Uncle Iroh after the ending of the original series. Uncle Iroh has settled down at Ba Sing Se, toiling away in peace at his tea shop when he is paid a visit by June. June has some urgent Fire Nation business to take care of.

== Ashes of the Academy ==
Ursa worries about the Royal Fire Academy for Girls, recalling its role in shaping Azula, but Zuko reassures her that he has reformed the school to protect the next generation and encourages her to trust him. Kiyi enters the Academy with her friend Lihua, navigating tensions between noble and commoner students while asserting the importance of learning the truth about the Fire Nation's history. Conflicts arise, including a fight with nobles and disputes over Agni Kai duels, which headmistress Shihan initially mishandles due to her adherence to tradition. Zuko appoints Mai as a teacher to help guide reforms, and she introduces more compassionate, honest teachings, challenging old values that glorified domination and violence. Through flashbacks, Mai reflects on her past interactions with Azula and the pressures of Fire Nation politics. Mai, Kiyi, and Lihua work to protect students while confronting classism, historical revisionism, and lingering threats from Azula's loyalists, including Dai Li agents. Over time, Shihan recognizes the need for reform, Mai finds fulfillment in teaching, and with Zuko and Ty Lee's support, the Academy evolves into a place that values truth, empathy, and the potential for a different Fire Nation future.
