= Avatar: The Last Airbender – The Lost Adventures =

Graphic novel anthology

- Avatar: The Last Airbender – The Lost Adventures cover
- Date: June 15, 2011
- Publisher: Dark Horse Comics

Creative team
- Creators: Michael Dante DiMartino; Bryan Konietzko
- Editors: Samantha Robertson

Original publication
- Published in: Avatar: The Last Airbender
- ISBN: 9781595827487 (Graphic novel); 9781506722740 (Library edition)

Avatar: The Last Airbender – The Lost Adventures is a graphic novel anthology published by Dark Horse Comics collecting short stories from 2005 to 2011. The Lost Adventures features twenty-six in-continuity stories set throughout the run of the Avatar: The Last Airbender TV series, most of which had previously appeared in Nickelodeon Magazine or as part of DVD collections. Many of the writers and artists worked on the original animated series.

== Stories ==
The Lost Adventures is divided into three books—Water, Earth, and Fire—corresponding to the three seasons of the TV series. On the table below, creators marked with a † worked on the Avatar: The Last Airbender TV series, and creators marked with a ‡ worked on The Legend of Korra TV series.

Title		Story	Art	Colors	Lettering
Book One — Water					
Book One — Water	“Bee Calm”	Joshua Hamilton †‡ John O'Bryan †	Justin Ridge †‡	Hye Jung Kim †	Clem Robins
Book One — Water	Originally appeared in the June 2005 issue of Nickelodeon Magazine and later in the 2006 Nick Mag Presents: Avatar: The Last Airbender.				
Book One — Water	“Water War”	Tim Hedrick †‡	Justin Ridge †‡	Hye Jung Kim †	Comicraft
Book One — Water	Originally appeared in the 2006 Nick Mag Presents: Avatar: The Last Airbender.				
Book One — Water	“Don't Blow It!”	Alison Wilgus	Elsa Garagarza †	Wes Dzioba	Comicraft
Book One — Water	Originally appeared in Nickelodeon Comics Club.				
Book One — Water	“Relics”	Johane Matte ‡ Joshua Hamilton †‡	Johane Matte ‡	Hye Jung Kim †	Comicraft
Book One — Water	Originally appeared in Nickelodeon Magazine and later in the Avatar: The Last Airbender / Star Wars: The Clone Wars Free Comic Book Day 2011 issue from Dark Horse Comics.				
Book One — Water	“Fruit-Stand Freestyle”	Brian Ralph			Comicraft
Book One — Water	Originally appeared in the 2007 Nick Mag Presents: Avatar: The Last Airbender.				
Book Two — Earth					
Book Two — Earth	“Sleepbending”	Joshua Hamilton †‡	Joaquim Dos Santos †‡	Hye Jung Kim †	Clem Robins
Book Two — Earth	Originally appeared in the 2006 Nick Mag Presents: Avatar: The Last Airbender.				
Book Two — Earth	“Lessons”	Johane Matte ‡		Wes Dzioba	Comicraft
Book Two — Earth	Originally appeared in the August 2007 issue of Nickelodeon Magazine.				
Book Two — Earth	“Sokka the Avatar”	Joshua Hamilton †‡	Justin Ridge †‡	Sno Cone Studios	Comicraft
Book Two — Earth	Originally appeared in the 2006 Nick Mag Presents: Avatar: The Last Airbender.				
Book Two — Earth	“Dirty Is Only Skin Deep”	J. Torres	Gurihiru		Comicraft
Book Two — Earth	Originally appeared in Nickelodeon Magazine. Gurihiru worked on the Avatar: The Last Airbender graphic novel trilogies from 2012 to 2017.				
Book Two — Earth	“Divided We Fall”	Frank Pittarese	Justin Ridge †‡	Hye Jung Kim †; Wes Dzioba	Comicraft
Book Two — Earth	Originally appeared serialized in four parts with the Avatar: The Last Airbender – Book Two individual DVD volumes.				
Book Two — Earth	“Reach for the Toph”	J. Torres	Corey Lewis		Comicraft
Book Two — Earth	Originally appeared in Nickelodeon Magazine.				
Book Two — Earth	“It's Only Natural!”	Johane Matte ‡ Joshua Hamilton †‡	Johane Matte ‡	Wes Dzioba	Comicraft
Book Two — Earth	Originally appeared in the 2007 Nick Mag Presents: Avatar: The Last Airbender.				
Book Two — Earth	“Going Home Again”	Aaron Ehasz †; May Chan †; Katie Mattila †‡ Alison Wilgus	Amy Kim Ganter	Wes Dzioba	Comicraft
Book Two — Earth	Originally appeared in the 2007 Nick Mag Presents: Avatar: The Last Airbender.				
Book Two — Earth	“The Bridge”	Joshua Hamilton †‡ Tim Hedrick †‡ Aaron Ehasz †; Frank Pittarese	Reagan Lodge		Comicraft
Book Two — Earth	Originally appeared in the 2007 Nick Mag Presents: Avatar: The Last Airbender.				
Book Three — Fire					
Book Three — Fire	“Private Fire”	Joshua Hamilton †‡	Johane Matte ‡	Wes Dzioba	Comicraft
Book Three — Fire	Originally appeared serialized in four parts with the Avatar: The Last Airbender – Book Three individual DVD volumes.				
Book Three — Fire	“Night Animals”	Katie Mattila †‡	Justin Ridge †‡	Wes Dzioba	Comicraft
Book Three — Fire	Originally appeared in the April 2008 issue of Nickelodeon Magazine.				
Book Three — Fire	“Boys' Day Out”	Alison Wilgus	Gurihiru		Comicraft
Book Three — Fire	Originally appeared in Nickelodeon Magazine.				
Book Three — Fire	“Ember Island Arcade”	Corey Lewis			Comicraft
Book Three — Fire	Originally appeared in Nickelodeon Magazine.				
Book Three — Fire	“Monster Slayer”	J. Torres	Gurihiru		Comicraft
Book Three — Fire	Originally appeared in Nickelodeon Magazine.				
Book Three — Fire	“Combustion Man on a Train”	Alison Wilgus; Rawles Lumumba	Tom McWeeney	Wes Dzioba	Comicraft
Book Three — Fire	Originally appeared in Nickelodeon Magazine.				
Book Three — Fire	“Swordbending”	Alison Wilgus	Justin Ridge †‡	Wes Dzioba	Comicraft
Book Three — Fire	Originally appeared in Nickelodeon Comics Club.				
Book Three — Fire	“No Benders Allowed”	Alison Wilgus	Elsa Garagarza †	Wes Dzioba	Comicraft
Book Three — Fire	Originally appeared in Nickelodeon Comics Club.				
Book Three — Fire	“Love Is a Battlefield”	J. Torres	Gurihiru		Comicraft
Book Three — Fire	Originally appeared in Nickelodeon Magazine.				
Book Three — Fire	“Dragon Days”	Alison Wilgus	FRAMING SEQUENCE: Johane Matte ‡ FLASHBACK: Tom McWeeney	Wes Dzioba	Comicraft
Book Three — Fire	Originally appeared in Nickelodeon Comics Club.				
Book Three — Fire	“Game Time!”	Katie Mattila †‡	Justin Ridge †‡	Hye Jung Kim †	Comicraft
Book Three — Fire	Originally appeared in Nickelodeon Comics Club.				
Book Three — Fire	“Bumi vs. Toph, Round 1”	Johane Matte ‡ Joshua Hamilton †‡	Johane Matte ‡	Hye Jung Kim †	Comicraft
Book Three — Fire	Originally appeared in Nickelodeon Comics Club.				
Bonus Stories					
Bonus Stories	“New Recruits”	Dave Roman	Justin Ridge †‡	Sno Cone Studios; Hye Jung Kim †	Comicraft
Bonus Stories	Originally appeared in Nickelodeon Magazine. This is an out-of-continuity story.				
Bonus Stories	“Gym Time”	Alison Wilgus	Ethan Spaulding †‡	Wes Dzioba	Comicraft
Bonus Stories	Originally appeared in the 2007 Nick Mag Presents: Avatar: The Last Airbender. This is an out-of-continuity story.				
