= Avatar: The Last Airbender – Team Avatar Tales =

- Avatar: The Last Airbender – Team Avatar Tales cover by Sara Kipin with Ryan Hill
- Date: October 2, 2019
- Publisher: Dark Horse Comics

Creative team
- Creators: Michael Dante DiMartino; Bryan Konietzko
- Editors: Rachel Roberts; Jenny Blenk (assistant editor)

Original publication
- Published in: Avatar: The Last Airbender
- ISBN: 9781506707938 (Graphic novel); 9781506722740 (Library edition)

The Avatar: The Last Airbender – Team Avatar Tales is a graphic novel anthology published by Dark Horse Comics collecting the 2013, 2014, and 2015 Free Comic Book Day stories and several original short stories created for this collection. It is part of Dark Horse Comics' continuation of the Avatar: The Last Airbender television series.

== Stories ==
Title	Story	Art	Colors	Lettering
“Rebound”†	Gene Luen Yang	Ryan Hill		Michael Heisler
Taking place after the events of The Promise, Mai is now working at her aunt Mura's flower shop. A boy named Kei Lo asks her out on a date, which she accepts. Though the date goes fine at first, Kei Lo takes her to a secret hideout, where she finds out he's working for her father, Ukano. Ukano has formed a rebellion group named "The New Ozai Society", who aim to usurp Zuko from the throne and put Ozai back in power, and attempts to motivate his daughter to join them using her recent breakup with Zuko as motivation. Seeing the group aim to kill Zuko and her father attempting to raise her younger brother Tom-Tom under these beliefs, she escapes with her younger brother back to Mura's, where she's shown to miss Zuko despite ending their relationship. Originally published in Dark Horse's Star Wars / Captain Midnight / Avatar: The Last Airbender FCBD 2013 issue
“The Substitute”	Dave Scheidt	Little Corvus		
Taking place during the first half of Book Three: Fire, Sokka puts on a moustache to disguise himself so he can get some snacks for the team. He is mistaken for a substitute teacher and brought in to a Fire Nation school to teach. After the children take his snacks, he tries teaching them swordfighting, but one of the kids knocks off his moustache. To keep them from telling him in trouble, he uses his remaining money to buy the children and eventually returns to the team defeated and starving.
“Shells”†	Gene Luen Yang	Faith Erin Hicks	Cris Peter	Michael Heisler
Sokka and Suki check out a shell store in a Fire Nation town. When they see a young girl being harassed by the store owners, Suki stands up to them and puts them in her place with her chi blocking. Suki teaches the girl, named Giya, the history of the Kyoshi Warriors and how Avatar Kyoshi formed them to teach the women how to stand up to their oppressors. With Sokka and Suki's encouragement, Giya gathers her friends to learn some self-defense techniques from Suki. Originally published in Dark Horse's Avatar: The Last Airbender / Itty Bitty Hellboy / Juice Squeezers FCBD 2014 issue
“Sokka's Poem”	Ron Koertge	Gene Luen Yang	Lark Pien	Gene Luen Yang
A short poem focused on Sokka's role on Team Avatar, and how he stays up at night to stay watch and protect the team while strategizing their new objectives.
“Toph and the Boulder”	Sara Goetter		Natalie Riess	Sara Goetter
Toph finds out that The Boulder owns a crococat named The Pebble, who has been screaming and ornery lately. As his pet hates going to the vet, Toph and the Boulder try giving it different foods to see if it will calm down, but nothing appears to be working. When they hear the yelling stop, Toph finds The Pebble in his bedroom, where it is revealed she is female and has given birth to a litter of crocokittens. Despite having her promise to keep them a secret, the Boulder unveils his pet and her children at his and Toph's rematch in the Earth Rumble tournament before he is yet again easily defeated.
“Origami”	Kiku Hughes			
While picking berries, Katara and Momo hear nearby townsfolk in Maizu Village under attack from Fire Nation soldiers and rescue them. Grateful for her aid, a father named Zenko invites her, Aang, and Sokka for dinner with his family. At dinner, he reveals his shy daughter, Chio, can "paperbend" and create origami, impressing the trio. Despite Chio feeling her artistic talents don't match up to their powers and they're only acting impressed to be polite, Katara tells her they genuinely admire her work and that having hope and optimism is just as important for the war as much as the fighters. Before they leave, Chio gifts Katara a water-themed paper crane as a good luck charm, and Katara tells Chio her bending could help save the world.
“Sisters”†	Gene Luen Yang	Carla Speed McNeil	Jenn Manley Lee	Michael Heisler
Toph finds Ty Lee feeling down after training with the Kyoshi Warriors and tries cheering her up by bringing her to a nearby traveling circus. Ty Lee quickly finds out that it's the same circus she used to perform in before Azula recruited her and that her six identical sisters now perform there as a six person acrobat act. She ends up getting into an argument with them as they seemingly initially agreed to have their own talents so their parents would not compare them only for them to debate who had acrobats originally. Ty Lee comes to realize she's been feeling down lately because being with the Kyoshi Warriors reminds her of her time at home trying to stand out from her sisters and considers quitting. As they leave, they catch two extortionists attempting to burn down the circus tent. While Toph takes care of the firebender, Ty Lee struggles with the strongman until her sisters come out and assist her, leading the siblings to reconcile. The next day, Ty Lee tells Suki she plans to stay with the Kyoshi Warriors after her sisters helped her realize there are advantages to working together in a group. Originally published in Dark Horse's Avatar: The Last Airbender / Plants vs. Zombies / Bandette FCBD 2015 issue
“The Scarecrow”	Dave Scheidt	Coni Yovaniniz		
Team Avatar meets an old man in a pumpkin patch trying to find out what has been eating his pumpkins lately. To help him with his problem, they decide to dress Sokka up as a scarecrow with a jack-o-lantern face and place him near some pumpkins, attracting the true culprits, a flock of raccoon-crows. Sokka begins flailing after a bee gets inside of the pumpkin, scaring off the raccoon-crows. To ensure the creatures don't come back, they set up a scarecrow next to a watermill to make it look like it's always moving. The grateful farmer rewards them by baking them some pumpkin pie.
