= Avatar: The Last Airbender – Smoke and Shadow =

American graphic novel

- Avatar: The Last Airbender – Smoke and Shadow, Part 1 cover
- Date: October 6, 2015 (Part 1); December 29, 2015 (Part 2); April 12, 2016 (Part 3)
- No. of issues: 3
- Publisher: Dark Horse Comics

Creative team
- Writers: Gene Yang
- Artists: Studio Gurihiru
- Pencillers: Chifuyu Sasaki
- Inkers: Chifuyu Sasaki
- Letterers: Michael Heisler
- Colourists: Naoko Kawano
- Creators: Michael Dante DiMartino; Bryan Konietzko
- Editors: Dave Marshall

Original publication
- Published in: Avatar: The Last Airbender
- ISBN: 9781616557614 (Part One); 9781616557904 (Part Two); 9781616558383 (Part Three); 9781506700137 (Library edition)

Chronology
- Preceded by: The Rift (comic)
- Followed by: North and South (comic)

Avatar: The Last Airbender – Smoke and Shadow is the fourth graphic novel trilogy created as a continuation of Avatar: The Last Airbender by Michael Dante DiMartino and Bryan Konietzko. It takes place following the events of The Search, with the first part taking place during the events of The Rift, and the other two parts taking place after it. As a close sequel to the original Avatar series, it depicts events that occur before the sequel series The Legend of Korra. The next comic trilogy by the same authors, occurring immediately after Smoke and Shadow and before Legend of Korra, is North and South.

== Overview ==
Smoke and Shadow returns attention to the state of the Fire Nation and its royal family, which were previously emphasized in The Promise and The Search. With the aid of Avatar Aang and Zuko's estranged ex-girlfriend Mai, Fire Lord Zuko must deal with the threat of the New Ozai Society, a group that seeks to overthrow him and restore his deposed father, Fire Lord Ozai, to the throne of the Fire Nation. Their conflict with the group is complicated by the fact that it is led by Mai's own estranged father, and appears to be in league with a group of malevolent spirits known as the Kemurikage.

== Plot ==
=== Part One ===
Ukano, father of Mai and former Fire Nation governor, is visited in the night by the Kemurikage, dark spirits from Fire Nation folklore. They tell him that he must act to make up for his failure by removing Zuko from the throne of the Fire Nation. Thus motivated, he gathers the New Ozai Society and announces plans to strike quickly in an effort to eliminate Zuko. However, one of his subordinates, Kei Lo, expresses doubts, fearing that they are moving too quickly. Elsewhere, Aang and his friends escort Zuko and his mother Ursa, stepfather Noren and half-sister Kiyi back to the Fire Nation capital; owing to her traumatic marriage with Zuko's father, Fire Lord Ozai, Ursa is fearful about returning, negatively impacting her relationship with Kiyi.

Back in the Fire Nation, Ty Lee finds Mai staying with family after her parents have separated due to her father's continued loyalty to Ozai. She then reveals that her father sent Kei Lo to attempt to spy on her by pretending to be romantically interested in her, but that she intends to use his duplicity to her advantage. Ty Lee becomes uneasy about her friend's deception, especially since Kei Lo's feelings towards Mai prove genuine and she is taking advantage of him. Having learned of the society's plans, they alert Zuko, who is met by a submarine carrying his uncle Iroh and the Kyoshi Warriors; the former to act as a decoy, and the latter to provide protection while Zuko and his family take a secret route back to the capital.

The supposed attack soon takes place on the main road, but Mai — who has joined the Kyoshi Warriors on security duty — realizes that they have been duped into sending Zuko and his family on a less secure path. She immediately suspects Kei Lo of deceiving them, but has little time to worry about it as she and the others go to thwart the real attempt on Zuko's life. Kei Lo, who is among the society members on the real assault, rebels when Ukano announces his intentions to harm Zuko's family due to the Fire Lord's resistance. Fortunately, they are joined by Mai and her reinforcements, and Mai quickly moves to confront her father; however, he makes his escape after offering her the chance to take him into custody.

With the ambush thwarted, the Kemurikage appear to Ukano again, warning that he will suffer if Zuko is not removed from power, but he appeals to them to give him a month to accomplish the task or lose everything. A month later, Mai and Kei Lo are apparently returning from a date when they spot the Kemurikage abducting Mai's younger brother Tom-Tom. Zuko, hearing of the kidnapping, arrives to offer help, but then expresses his conviction that they will need additional aid—that of the Avatar.

=== Part Two ===
Aang, Katara, and Sokka receive Zuko's request for help as they prepare to pay a visit to the Southern Water Tribe. After a brief discussion, the siblings decide to return home while Aang goes to aid Zuko in dealing with the Kemurikage. Within the Fire Nation, Ukano urges Zuko to take decisive action to deal with the Kemurikage, but Aang convinces the Fire Lord to gather more information before doing anything drastic. A furious Ukano warns Constable Sung, the leader of the investigation into Tom-Tom's kidnapping, that more trouble will follow as long as Zuko refuses to act to protect his people. That night, Sung's four-year-old son Guri and several other children are kidnapped by the Kemurikage, and he is convinced to act without waiting for Zuko's permission.

Aang, Zuko, Mai and Kei Lo travel to the Fire Sages Capital Temple, the burial place of previous Fire Lords, to learn more about the Kemurikage. Exploring the temple catacombs, they discover that the Kemurikage first appeared in the time before the first Fire Lord, to punish a warlord who had kidnapped a village's children after they were unable to pay him tribute. Aang is later contacted by one of the Kemurikage, who claims that the spirits have never set foot in the human world since the Fire Nation was formed and the warlords of the past were punished for their crimes, leading the group to suspect that the Kemurikage appearing now are fakes. Returning to the capital, the group discover that Ukano and Sung have instituted a nighttime curfew and assembled the Safe Nation Society, a volunteer force dedicated to fighting the Kemurikage. Zuko suspends Sung for acting without orders, and demands that the Safe Nation Society disband, much to the disapproval of his friends and his people.

The kidnapped children, including Tom-Tom, are then shown to all be imprisoned within an underground room in an unknown location. Ukano visits the children and explains to Tom-Tom that he intends to make the Fire Nation strong again, and that he is working with the fake Kemurikage to achieve this goal. That night, Kiyi is kidnapped by the fake Kemurikage, and in the ensuing struggle, one of the fake Kemurikage attacks Zuko with lightning, leading the Fire Lord to deduce that the "spirit" is actually his long-lost sister Azula.

=== Part Three ===
Azula fights off the group's attempts to capture her, and escapes by seemingly vanishing into thin air. The next morning, Mai informs Zuko of her suspicions about Ukano, and of his involvement with the New Ozai Society. Deciding that Aang's moderate approach has failed, Zuko forbids his people from leaving the capital, and has his men search the homes of Safe Nation Society members in order to find Ukano. Aang, Suki and Ty Lee decide to investigate on their own, and eventually discover a secret passage that Azula used to escape.

Outside the children's prison, Azula—who has mostly recovered from her insanity—orders Ukano to have the Safe Nation Society riot in the streets. While reluctant to continue with the plan as a result of Tom-Tom's imprisonment, Ukano agrees despite not seeing how it will restore Ozai, unaware that doing so isn't Azula's goal. The riot is broken up by Zuko's soldiers, and most of the Safe Nation Society members are arrested. With all of his loyal supporters now imprisoned, Ukano pleads with Azula to release all of the imprisoned children, but she refuses, fearing that the children will lead Zuko to her.

After Kei Lo is discovered to have been among those arrested, having gotten caught up in the riot, Zuko releases him after he and Mai protest, and Kei Lo accuses the Fire Lord of going hard on him because of his relationship with Mai. Soon afterwards, Aang shows up to take the three of them to the secret passage Ty Lee found, which leads to a graveyard for the Fire Lords' families. After exiting the passage, the four of them are attacked by Azula and the other fake Kemurikage, who are revealed to be Azula's fellow patients in the mental institution where she was once imprisoned. As the other three battle the fake Kemurikage, Zuko pursues and fights Azula, who reveals that her goal is not to become the Fire Lord herself, but to turn Zuko into a tyrannical Fire Lord like her, in essence making her the Fire Lord.

Elsewhere, the children are able to escape when Kiyi uses firebending to melt the metal door to the cell, having observed Zuko practicing his firebending forms in the royal gardens. Ukano aids them, and they are then rescued by Aang, Mai and Kei Lo. Despite this setback, Azula insists that her plan has not failed, pointing out the harsh measures Zuko has recently taken to keep his people in line. Warning him that he is no different than her, Azula flees.

Ukano accepts imprisonment for his crimes, and Mai, while stating that he deserves punishment, also acknowledges his bravery in defying Azula. In a public address, Zuko apologizes to his people for his poor leadership while Azula and her allies watch from afar. Azula seems pleased with Zuko's speech, possibly implying that she was using reverse psychology on Zuko. Kei Lo and Mai end their relationship. Elsewhere, Ursa follows advice from Iroh to face her fear with unclouded eyes; she confronts the imprisoned Ozai, who attempts to intimidate her into submission by threatening her and her family. Resisting his threats, Ursa remarks on his arrogant and callous nature, before leaving as he fruitlessly demands that she grovel before him. Returning to her family's bedroom in the Fire Nation royal palace, she reconciles with Kiyi.
