= Avatar: The Last Airbender – The Promise =

Graphic novel

- Avatar: The Last Airbender – The Promise, Part 1 cover
- Date: January 25, 2012 (Part 1); May 30, 2012 (Part 2); October 9, 2012 (Part 3)
- Publisher: Dark Horse Comics

Creative team
- Writers: Gene Yang
- Artists: Studio Gurihiru
- Pencillers: Chifuyu Sasaki
- Inkers: Chifuyu Sasaki
- Letterers: Michael Heisler
- Colourists: Naoko Kawano
- Creators: Michael Dante DiMartino; Bryan Konietzko
- Editors: Dave Marshall

Original publication
- Published in: Avatar: The Last Airbender
- ISBN: 9781595828118 (Part One); 9781595828750 (Part Two); 9781595829412 (Part Three); 9781616550745 (Library edition); 9781506717845 (Omnibus)

Chronology
- Preceded by: Sozin's Comet, Part 4: Avatar Aang
- Followed by: The Search (comic)

Avatar: The Last Airbender – The Promise is a graphic novel in three parts written by Gene Yang and illustrated by Studio Gurihiru, the first in a series of graphic novel trilogies serving as both a continuation of the Avatar: The Last Airbender and a prequel to The Legend of Korra, both animated television series created by Michael Dante DiMartino and Bryan Konietzko. Part 1 was released on January 25, 2012, Part 2 was released on May 30, 2012 and Part 3 was released on September 26, 2012.

The events of The Promise begin immediately after the last episode of the original series, "Avatar Aang", before jumping forward one whole year. It is followed by Avatar: The Last Airbender – The Search.

== Overview ==
Although the Hundred Year War is finally over, tensions run high as one-hundred- thirteen-year-old Avatar Aang and seventeen-year-old Zuko are put on a "collision course" after the Avatar travels to a Fire Nation colony named Yu Dao, and finds "tension between neighbors" – a threat that may shatter the world's newfound peace.

The unfinished conversation between Zuko and Ozai about the whereabouts of Ursa, Zuko's long-lost mother, is completed, but the conversation takes a different path after Zuko asks the question and her fate still remains unknown. Zuko forces Aang to promise to kill him if he becomes like his father, the deposed Fire Lord Ozai.

Negotiations with Earth King Kuei and the beginning of the Harmony Restoration Movement commence. The movement plans to take the people in the Fire Nation colonies and move them into the Fire Nation itself. However, an unexpected controversy breaks out, as the older colonies are composed of people who have never lived within the Fire Nation and have intermarried with Earth Kingdom citizens. These people view the movement as robbing them of their homes. Fire Lord Zuko is caught between the desires of his people and the demands of many who believe peace and balance are only attainable if Fire Nation citizens return to their country. When the Earth Kingdom army arrives to enforce the Restoration Movement, Zuko deploys his own forces in defense of the colonies, leading to an explosive showdown between the recently belligerent sides that threatens to reignite the fires of war. Aang must decide whether to follow through on his promise and decide the fate of the colonies in the process.

In the midst of this dispute, Toph's new metal bending school finds itself in trouble, while Aang is confronted with the "Avatar Aang Fan Club," a growing group of young individuals trying to live as the air nomads did, but Aang views these people as parodying and denigrating the memory of his people.

== Plot ==
=== Part One ===
Following Fire Lord Ozai's defeat and the conclusion of the Hundred Year War, the Harmony Restoration Movement is established to remove the Fire Nation Colonies in the Earth Kingdom and relocate the colonists to the Fire Nation. Having become the new Fire Lord, Zuko makes Aang promise to kill him if he turns out like his father.

One year later, Kori Morishita, a Fire Nation colonial, attempts to assassinate Zuko, but he stops her. Kori tells Zuko that she is firmly against the Harmony Restoration Movement and her father is the Mayor of Yu Dao, the first colony created by the Fire Nation. Zuko travels to the city to confront the Morishita family. He learns that over the last century, the Fire Nation colonists have become deeply integrated with the original Earth Kingdom citizens, to the point that there are now mixed-race families, industries that use expertise from both cultures, and Earthbenders who consider themselves Fire Nation citizens, including Kori. Realizing that the Harmony Restoration Movement would bring an end to these positive developments, Zuko withdraws his support for it.

Zuko's decision causes protests from Earth Kingdom citizens, including the Freedom Fighters, who believe that Zuko is refusing to give up the colonies. Aang, Katara, and Sokka are shocked by Zuko's decision and travel to Yu Dao to confront him. Aang's predecessor, Avatar Roku, urges Aang to fulfill his promise to Zuko, reminding him that his own failure to kill Fire Lord Sozin led to the Hundred Year War happening in the first place. Shortly after they arrive in Yu Dao, Aang and Katara get into a fight with Zuko and his troops, and Aang nearly goes into the Avatar State, but Katara talks him out of it.

Despite seeing the prosperity of Yu Dao himself, Aang insists that the world cannot live in harmony if the Fire Nation continues occupying part of the Earth Kingdom. Katara suggests that Yu Dao could be the exception to the Harmony Restoration Movement, but Zuko states that the remaining colonies should not be dismantled either. Although doubtful, Aang agrees to try to get Earth King Kuei to talk with Zuko on what to do. The Earth Kingdom protestors are unhappy with Aang's decision, having suffered the presence of the colonies for over a century, and give him three days before they attempt to retake the city for themselves. Zuko returns to the Fire Nation and visits his imprisoned father, Ozai, for advice.

=== Part Two ===
Aang and Katara travel to the city of Ba Sing Se to meet with Earth King Kuei. Upon arriving in the metropolis, Aang learns that several of the city's inhabitants have created a fan club devoted to him. Aang briefly enjoys the company of his fans because they remind him of his old life among the Air Nomads. Aang and Katara try to convince Kuei to meet with Zuko, but the Earth King, in an attempt to appear strong after Long Feng's manipulation of him, states that he will order troops to Yu Dao to ensure the completion of the Harmony Restoration movement. Aang and Katara return to Yu Dao to try and convince the colonists to evacuate before the Earth King's army arrives.

In the Fire Nation, Ozai talks about Zuko's indecisiveness and refers to an event from Zuko's childhood where he was nearly killed because he could not make a decision. Zuko interprets the story as his father saying that he should side with the stronger side in the conflict, but Ozai tells him that, as Fire Lord, whatever decision he makes is the right one, by virtue of the fact that he made it. Correctly predicting Kuei's response to the Yu Dao crisis, Ozai urges his son to do whatever is necessary to protect his citizens, viewing them as an expression of the Fire Lord's will. Zuko subsequently becomes reluctant to do so, out of fear that he would be no different from his father.

In a subplot, Sokka learns that Toph's metalbending academy, which she set up in Yu Dao following the end of the Hundred Year War, has been taken over by a rival firebending dojo as a result of Zuko's new opposition to the Harmony Restoration movement. Sokka and the firebending master, Kunyo, agree to a match between Toph's students and his disciples in three days, but Sokka is unaware that Toph's students don't know how to bend metal and Kunyo's students are much more advanced. After several unsuccessful attempts to get the students metalbending, Toph gives up, explaining to Sokka that while she recruited her students with the belief that they could become metalbenders, she feels that she's been trying to force them to become something they're not, similar to how her parents treated her. Toph's students overhear the conversation, and upon realizing that Toph believed that they could become more than what they were, they are inspired to figure out how to metalbend, and subsequently win the match.

Zuko's girlfriend Mai learns about his meetings with Ozai from Suki, who is now one of his bodyguards. Upset that Zuko would keep secrets from her, Mai breaks up with him. Shortly afterwards, Zuko learns that Kuei's army is marching towards Yu Dao. Sadly admitting that his father was right, Zuko mobilizes his own forces to defend the colonists.

=== Part Three ===
Returning to Yu Dao, Aang and Katara learn that the people of the city have formed the Yu Dao Resistance, in response to the Earth Kingdom protesters, with Sneers as one of the members. Aang also encounters the Yu Dao chapter of the Avatar Aang Fan Club, who had been informed of the approaching conflict by the Ba Sing Se chapter, but becomes offended when he sees the members wearing airbending master tattoos, considering this an insult against his culture. He subsequently decides to see the Harmony Restoration movement through to the end, believing that harmony can only be achieved when all four nations are separate, as stronger nations cannot help but hurt or make fun of weaker ones. Leaving the scene with Aang, Katara, who no longer supports Harmony Restoration, starts to explain how she saw more than just Kori and her family when she saw Yu Dao, but is interrupted by an attempt by the protesters to force entry into the city.

As Aang and Katara unsuccessfully attempt to stop the protesters, Sokka, Toph and Suki, who had warned the other two about Zuko's intentions, attempt to delay the Fire Nation forces, fearing that another war will start when the two armies meet. Despite their best efforts, Zuko's army meets up with the Earth Kingdom army led by General Hao. Arriving on the scene, Aang goes into the Avatar State, while berating Zuko for giving up on the Harmony Restoration Movement. Katara again manages to talk him down, and explains that when she saw the Morishita family, a family with the heritage of two nations, she saw her and Aang's future, and asks what separating the nations will mean for the two of them. At her advice, Aang leaves the scene in order to decide on a course of action, whilst his friends and the Avatar Aang Fan Club attempt to stop the fighting. As Aang meditates, Roku again tells Aang to think of the world above all else and fulfill his promise, revealing that he is Zuko's great-grandfather on his mother's side. Aang is horrified that Roku would consider killing his great-grandson for the sake of harmony.

During the battle, Katara forces her way onto the blimp that the Earth King is watching the battle from, and realizes that he is unaware of the true nature of Yu Dao, having never been there himself. She convinces him to come down to the city and see the people who will have to live with his decisions. As Zuko and General Hao prepare to do battle, Aang arrives in the Avatar State. Believing that the Avatar has come to kill him, Zuko protests, before sadly admitting that he is doing exactly what his father would have done. Aang instead uses his Earthbending to create a huge chasm around Yu Dao, cutting the two armies off from the city, and rescues Zuko when the latter nearly falls into it. He introduces Kuei to the Yu Dao resistance and explains that the Earth King is not just fighting a colony, but a new kind of world. Kuei begins to understand the situation, while Zuko, faced with the revelation that he has been in the right all along, collapses.

Four days afterwards, Aang severs his connection with Roku, stating that the world is very different from when the last Avatar lived, and that he cannot think of the world without thinking of his friends, including Zuko, and Zuko wakes up from a 4-day sleep. Aang, Kuei and Zuko agree to meet and discuss the fate of Yu Dao, Zuko and Aang both believing that it must become something other than a Fire Nation colony or an Earth Kingdom city. Zuko also apologizes for having Aang make his promise in the first place, viewing it as a way to save him from having to choose between right and wrong, but Aang tells Zuko that it is not entirely his fault, and that he should have some faith in himself. Aang decides to teach the Avatar Aang Fan Club the ways of the Air Nomads in order to preserve their culture, dubbing them the Air Acolytes. The book ends with Zuko talking with his sister Azula, now incarcerated in a mental institution, about searching for their mother.

== Publication ==
Since the conclusion of the original series in July 2008, fans of Avatar: The Last Airbender had demanded a more satisfying denouement in relation to the fates of the main characters. In late 2010, Samantha Robertson, an editor at Dark Horse Comics at the time, approached comic author Gene Yang, who was best known for his American Born Chinese series. After "some conversations" with her and the creators of Avatar: The Last Airbender, Michael Dante DiMartino and Bryan Konietzko, Yang was contracted to write three comic books to serve as a direct continuation of the original series. Yang's approach to the writing of The Promise was purported to be "purist", and he collaborated closely with DiMartino and Konietzko.

== Reception ==
The Promise Part 1 has received mostly positive reviews, with Convention Scene praising Yang's portrayal of the characters. Convention Scene also praised Gurihiru Studio's artwork, stating that it did justice to the series. The Seattle Post-Intelligencer called the graphic novel an "enjoyable read even if you are not well versed in the story's universe."
