= Gene Luen Yang =

American graphic novelist (born 1973)

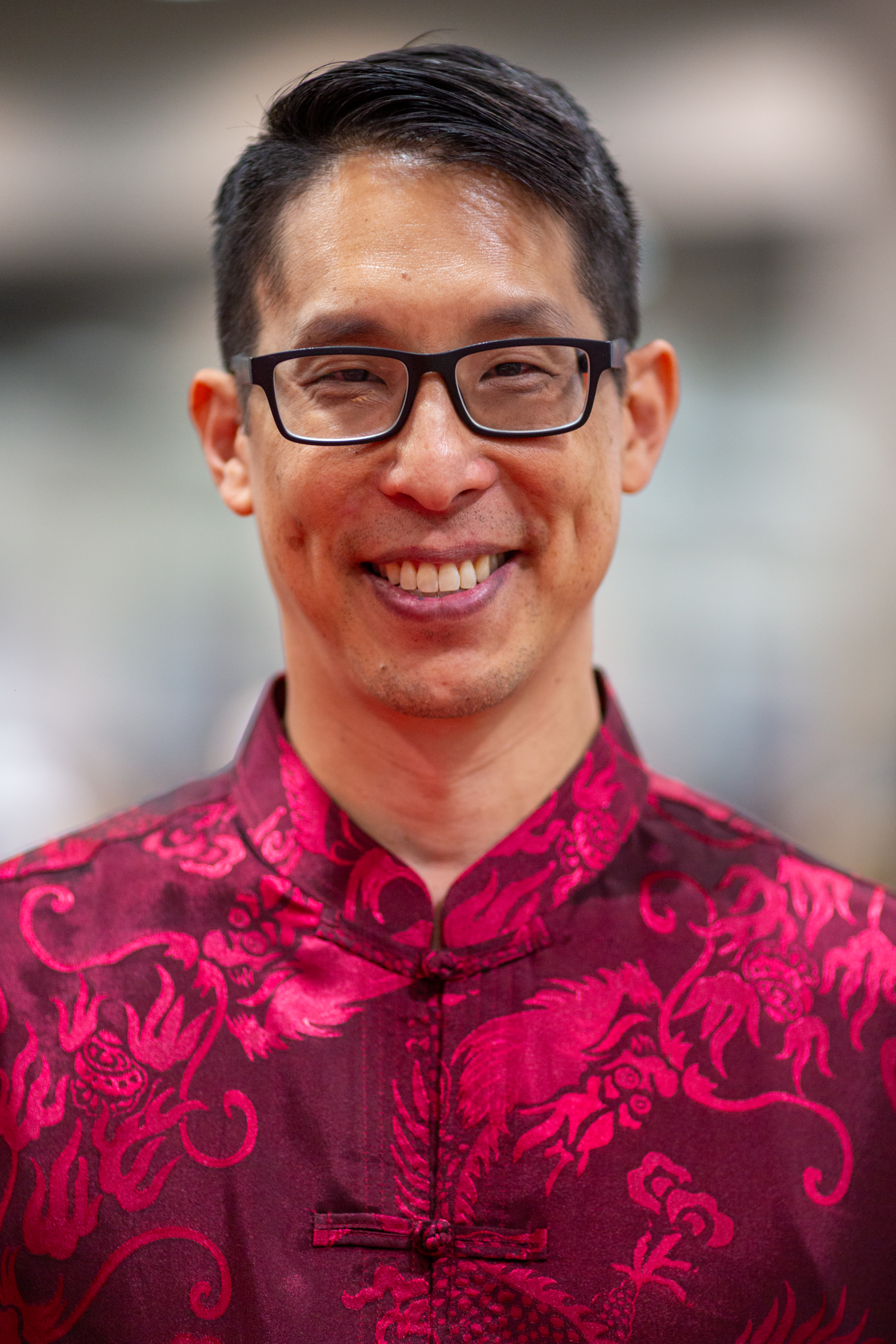
- Yang at the 2024 National Book Festival
- Born: August 9, 1973 (age 53); California, U.S.
- Education: University of California, Berkeley (BA), California State University, East Bay (MA)
- Spouse: Theresa Kim
- Children: 4
- Writing career
- Genre: Graphic novels
- Notable awards: MacArthur Fellow

Chinese name
- Traditional Chinese: 楊謹倫
- Simplified Chinese: 杨谨伦
Transcriptions
Standard Mandarin
- Hanyu Pinyin: Yáng Jǐnlún
- Wade–Giles: Yang Chin-lün
- Website: geneluenyang.com

Gene Luen Yang (Chinese: 楊謹倫; born August 9, 1973) is an American cartoonist and author. He is a frequent lecturer on the subjects of graphic novels and comics, at comic book conventions and universities, schools, and libraries. In addition, he was the Director of Information Services and taught computer science at Bishop O'Dowd High School in Oakland, California. In 2012, Yang joined the faculty at Hamline University as a part of the Low-Residency Master of Fine Arts in Writing for Children and Young Adults (MFAC) program. In 2016, the U.S. Library of Congress named him Ambassador for Young People's Literature. That year he became the third graphic novelist, alongside Lauren Redniss, to receive a MacArthur Fellowship.

== Early life and education ==
Yang was born on August 9, 1973 in Fremont, California and raised in the San Francisco Bay Area. His father, an electrical engineer from Taiwan and his mother, a programmer from Hong Kong with family roots in Taiwan, emigrated to the United States, where they met as graduate students at San Jose State University. He was raised in a Catholic household, where his parents instilled a strong work ethic and reinforced their Asian heritage. In a speech at Penn State, where he spoke as a part of a Graphic Novel Speaker Series, Yang recalled that both of his parents often told him stories during his childhood.

Yang was one member of a small number of Asian-American students in his elementary school. As a child, he aspired to become a Disney animator. In third grade, he completed a biography project on Walt Disney, which sparked what he later called his obsession with animation. His ambitions changed in fifth grade, when his mother took him to a local bookstore bought him his first comic, issue 57 of DC Comics Presents, featuring Superman. She had declined his initial choice, Marvel Two-in-One issue 99, because its cover The Thing and Rom, looked too frightening. Yang has said that reading the issue ignited his lifelong love of comic books and storytelling.

Yang attended the University of California, Berkeley for his undergraduate degree. He wanted to major in art, but his father encouraged him to pursue a more "practical" field, so Yang majored in computer science with a minor in creative writing.

== Works ==
After graduating in 1995, with a B.S in Computer Science from University of California, Berkeley, Yang worked for two years as a computer engineer. Following a five day silent retreat, he felt called to teaching and left his engineering job to teach computer science at a Bishop O'Dowd High School in Oakland, California, where he also served as Director of Information Services. He taught there 17 years from 1998 to 2015, while continuing to write and draw comics during evening and weekends. In 1996, he founded Humble Comics, through which he self-published Gordon Yamamoto and the King of the Greeks, later funded by a Xeric Grant. His work eventually reached major publishers, including First Second Books (an imprint of Macmillan Publishers), Marvel Comics, DC Comics, SLG Publishing, Dark Horse Comics, HarperTeen, The New Press, and Pauline Books & Media.

In 1997, Yang first published comic Gordon Yamamoto and the King of the Geeks under his Humble Comics imprint, and it won him the Xeric Grant, a self-publishing grant for comic book creators. Yang later published two more installments in the Gordon Yamamoto mini-series and a sequel, Loyola Chin and the San Peligran Order. In 2010, both Gordon Yamamoto and the King of the Geeks series and Loyola Chin and the San Pelgrino Order were published together as Animal Crackers by Slave Labor Graphics.

In 2006, Yang published American Born Chinese with First Second Publishing. Drawing upon the Chinese folk character of the trickster Monkey King, the book tells the story of a school-age second-generation immigrant who struggles with his Chinese-American identity. Although Yang drew from his own experiences, the book is not autobiographical. In 2021 Disney+ ordered production of a television adaptation of the book. Yang wrote American Born Chinese to look into what it means to be Chinese-American, drawing on his own experience with racism and cultural conflict. In shaping the graphic novel, he was inspired by the Chinese folktale Journey to the West, especially the Monkey King, and reimagined the story reflect the modern immigrant experience. According to Yang, the book is about "the pain of being an outsider", and tries to challenge racial stereotypes while giving young readers a way to connect if they face similar struggles. By mixing humor, mythology, and social commentary, Yang wanted to create a story that would reach many people and show how comics can help bridge cultural gaps by sharing common experience and building empathy.

Yang's other works have been recognized as well. In 2009, Yang was awarded another Eisner Award for Best Short Story for his collaborative work The Eternal Smile which he wrote and Derek Kirk Kim illustrated. Yang was nominated for Eisner Awards for both Prime Baby and his collaborative work with Thien Pham, Level Up.

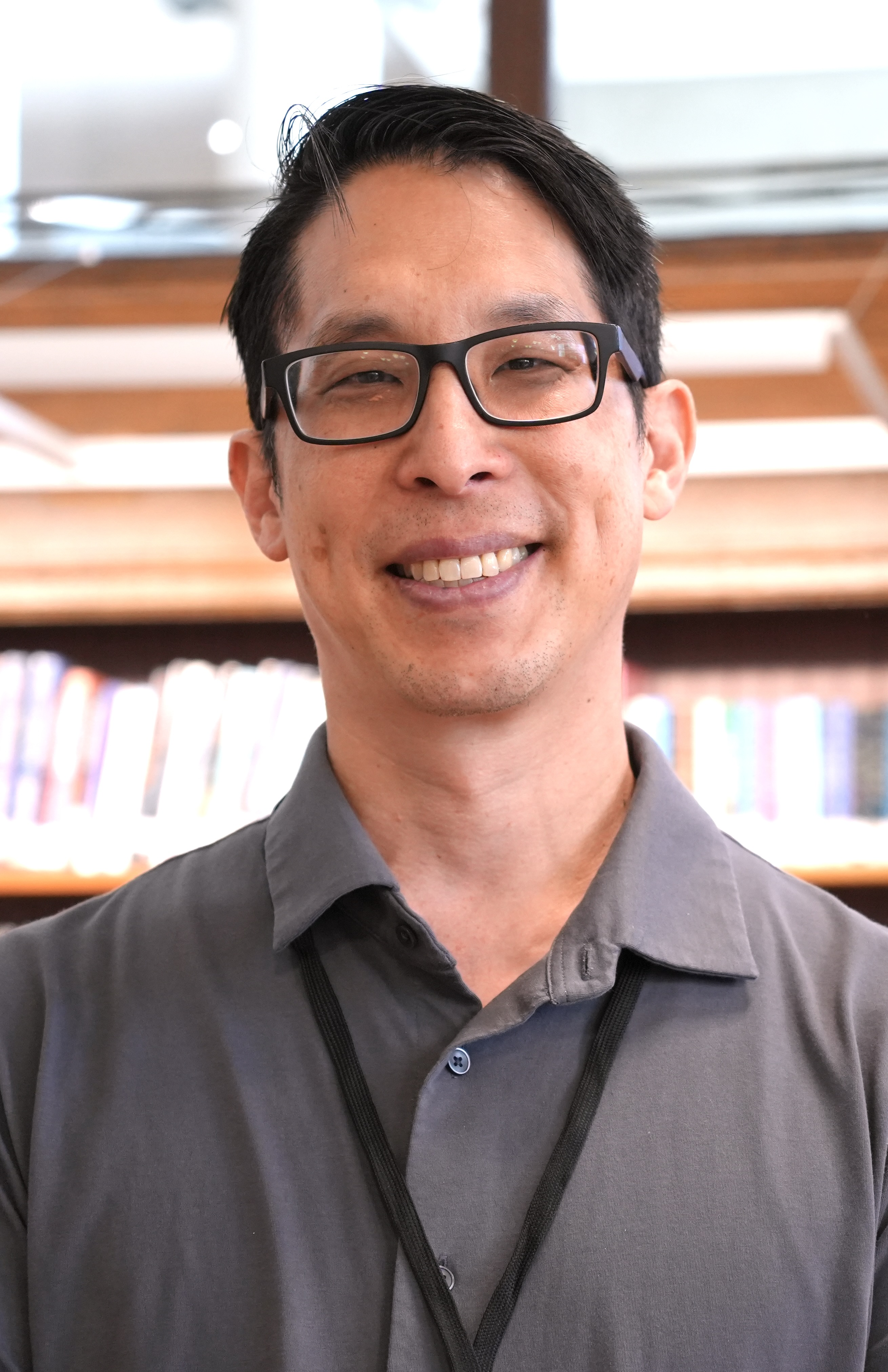
Yang at the Bay Area Book Festival 2025

Yang wrote the Avatar: The Last Airbender comics series for Dark Horse Comics, the first volume of which was released in January 2012. Yang's graphic novel, Boxers & Saints, which was published by First Second Books in September 2013. In July 2016, DC Comics released the first issue of New Super-Man, featuring a separate Chinese character in the Superman mold, written by Yang and drawn by Viktor Bogdanovic. In October 2019, Yang created a limited series, Superman Smashes the Klan, a loose adaptation of a famous 1946 story-arc from The Adventures of Superman radio series, "Clan of the Fiery Cross", in which an Asian-American family is threatened by the Ku Klux Klan and a young and unsure Superman is determined to protect the children from the terrorists. Making his Marvel Comics debut in 2020, Yang wrote a miniseries starring the martial arts superhero Shang-Chi. According to Yang, the series explores the relationship between Shang-Chi and his archenemy father Zheng Zu, who was originally the infamous villain Fu Manchu. In May 2021, in celebration of the Asian Pacific American Heritage Month, DC Comics launched the hero Monkey Prince, created by Yang and Bernard Chang.

Yang advocates the use of comics and graphic novels as educational tools in the classroom. In his final project for his master's degree at California State University, East Bay, he emphasized the educational strength of comics, claiming they are motivating, visual, permanent, intermediary, and popular. As a part of his Master's project, Yang created an online comic called Factoring with Mr. Yang & Mosley the Alien as a method of teaching math. This idea came from a time where Yang was substitute teaching a math class at Bishop O'Dowd. Due to his position as Director of Information Services, he was forced to miss classes and used the comics to help the students learn the concepts in his absence. Positive student feedback inspired him to use the idea for his Master's project.

In 2018, Yang joined the board of directors of the Comic Book Legal Defense Fund, a non-profit organization founded in 1986 chartered to protect the First Amendment rights of the comics community.

In 2024, Yang designed a comic mural for the museum Bay Area Walls. This mural features three basketball players, each with ties to the Bay Area, at distinct distances. Yang did extensive research as well as interviews to determine where to place Jeremy Lin, Fran Belibi, and Stephen Curry in his mural.

== Awards and recognition ==
- 2006, American Born Chinese became the first graphic novel to be a finalist for the National Book Award for Young People's Literature.
- 2007, American Born Chinese won the annual Michael L. Printz Award from the American Library Association.
- 2007, American Born Chinese received an Eisner Award for Best New Graphic Album.
- 2006-2007, American Born Chinese earned the Chinese American Librarians Association for Best Graphic Album.
- 2007, Other honors for American Born Chinese include being named to the Booklist Top Ten Graphic Novel for Youth, NPR Holiday Pick, Publishers Weekly Comics Week Best Comic of the Year, San Francisco Chronicle Best Book of the Year, the National Cartoonists Society Award for Best Comic Book, Time Top Ten Comic of the Year, and Amazon.com Best Graphic Novel/Comic of the Year.
- 2013, Boxer & Saints received an Los Angeles Times Book Prize and National Book Award for Young People's Literature.
- 2016, Boxer & Saints received an Library of Congress, Every Child a Reader and Children's Book Council, American Library Association's National Library Week.
- 2016, Yang was named to MacArthur Fellows Program, receiving what is commonly called the "Genius Grant". The MacArthur Foundation that names the fellows said that his "work for young adults demonstrates the potential of comics to broaden our understanding of diverse cultures and people".
- 2020, Dragon Hoops won Harvery Award for Book of the Year and Superman Smashes the Klan for Best Children or Young Adult Book.
- 2021, Dragon Hoops received for Printz Honor Book.
- 2021, Superman Smashes the Klan for Eisner Awards won Best Publication for Kids and Best Adaptation from Another Medium while Dragon Hoops won Best Publication for Teens.
- 2023, Yang was awarded the NSK Neustadt Prize for Children's and Young Adult Literature.
- 2023, Yang was awarded the Southern Miss Medallion.
- 2024, Yang was recipient of the John Steinbeck Award.
- 2025, Lunar New Year Love Story won Eisner Award for Best Publication for Teens, Best Graphic Album and Best Writer.

== Personal life ==
Yang is married to Theresa Kim, a development director for an elementary school. The couple has four children.

== Selected works ==
- The Rosary Comic Book (Pauline Books & Media, 2003) A graphic novel telling of the stories behind the mysteries of the Catholic rosary in which each panel represents one of the prayers.
- Animal Crackers (SLG Publishing, 2004) Featuring Gordon Yamamoto and the King of the Geeks and Loyola Chin and the San Peligran Order.
- American Born Chinese (First Second Books, 2006)
- The Eternal Smile (First Second Books, 2009). A collection of three short stories.
- Prime Baby (First Second Books, 2010) Thaddeus is upset to discover that not only is his baby sister (whom he hates) an inter-dimensional conduit for peace-loving aliens, but that nobody will believe him.
- Level Up (First Second Books, 2011) Dennis Ouyang's parents expect him to go to medical school instead of becoming a professional gamer. He finds himself trapped on the path to medical school by four angels and must find a way out.
- Avatar: The Last Airbender, illustrated by Gurihiru (Dark Horse Comics, 2012–2017):
  - The Promise (Dark Horse Comics, 2012)
  - The Search (Dark Horse Comics, 2013)
  - The Rift (Dark Horse Comics, 2014)
  - Smoke and Shadow (Dark Horse Comics, 2016)
  - North and South (Dark Horse Comics, 2017)
- Boxers and Saints (First Second Books, 2013), Two novels set during the Boxer Uprising, Boxers describes the "bands of foreign missionaries and soldiers" who "roam the countryside bullying and robbing Chinese peasants". Little Bao, "harnessing the powers of ancient Chinese gods", recruits an army of Boxers, "commoners trained in kung fu who fight to free China from 'foreign devils.'" Saints concerns an unwanted and unwelcome fourth daughter, Four-Girl, who finally finds friendship in Christianity. But bands of young men roam the countryside, murdering Westerners and Chinese Christians alike. She will have to decide whether she is willing to die for her faith. Boxers and Saints won the 2013 Los Angeles Times Book Prize for Young Adult Literature, was nominated for the 2014 Ignatz Award for Outstanding Graphic Novel, and was a 2013 National Book Award finalist.
- The Shadow Hero, illustrated by Sonny Liew (First Second Books, 2014) An origin story for the obscure Golden-Age comic book hero The Green Turtle, who is thought to be the first Asian-American superhero.
- Shadow Hero Comics #1, illustrated by Sonny Liew (Panda Express, 2017) A one-shot released for Asian Pacific American Heritage Month, featuring a kid-friendly story where the Green Turtle teams up with a new alien partner, Miss Stardust.
- Superman Vol. 3 #41–50, illustrated by John Romita Jr. and Klaus Janson (DC Comics, 2015–2016)
- Secret Coders, illustrated by Mike Holmes (First Second, 2015–)
  1. Secret Coders, 2015
  2. Paths & Portals, 2016
  3. Secrets & Sequences, 2017
  4. Robots & Repeats, 2017
  5. Potions & Parameters, 2018
  6. Monsters & Modules, 2018
- New Super-Man #1–18, series about a Chinese Superman, Kong Kenan (DC Comics, 2016–2018)
- New Super-Man and the Justice League of China, the series concludes the adventures of Kong Kenan and the other Chinese heroes (DC Comics, 2018)
- Free Comic Book Day: Fresh Off the Boat #1 (Boom! Comics, 2017)
- Superman Smashes the Klan (DC Comics, 2019–2020)
- The Terrifics #15–30 (DC Comics, 2019–2020)
- Dragon Hoops (First Second Books, 2020)
- Shang-Chi (Marvel Comics, 2020–2022)
- Batman/Superman #16–22 (DC Comics, 2021)
- Monkey Prince (DC Comics, 2021–2023)
- Shang-Chi and the Ten Rings (Marvel Comics, 2022)
- Shang-Chi: Master of the Ten Rings (Marvel Comics, 2023)
- Lazarus Planet (DC Comics, 2023)
  - Lazarus Planet: Alpha, 2023
  - Lazarus Planet: Omega, 2023
- Wolverine Vol. 7 #33 (Marvel Comics, 2023)
- Lunar New Year Love Story, illustrated by LeUyen Pham (First Second Books, 2024)
- The Books of Clash: Legendary Legends of Legendarious Achievery, illustrated by Alison Acton, Kendall Goode, and Les McClaine Vol. 1-6 (First Second Books, 2023–) A graphic novel series adapting the popular mobile games Clash of Clans and Clash Royale.

=== Anthologies ===
- Up All Night (Harper Collins) – 14-page short story
- Secret Identities (The New Press) – 12-page short story
- Strange Tales II (Marvel Comics) – 4-page short story
- Nursery Rhyme Comics (First Second Books) – 1-page short story
- Shattered (The New Press) – 4-page short story
- Open Mic (Candlewick) – 4-page short story
- Comic Squad: Recess! (Random House) – 12-page short story
