= Superman Smashes the Klan =

Limited series

- Trade paperback cover

Publication information
- Publisher: DC Comics
- Schedule: Bimonthly
- Format: Limited series
- Publication date: October 2019 – February 2020
- No. of issues: 3
- Main character(s): Superman, Tommy & Roberta Lee

Creative team
- Written by: Gene Luen Yang
- Artist: Gurihiru
- Letterer: Janice Chiang
- Editor: Maria Javins

Superman Smashes the Klan is a three-part superhero limited series comic book written by Gene Luen Yang with art by Gurihiru and published by DC Comics. It is a Superman story which is loosely based on the 1946 The Adventures of Superman radio show's story-arc "Clan of the Fiery Cross".

The opening sequence of Superman Smashes the Klan was loosely adapted to the 2021 Superman & Lois episode "A Brief Reminiscence In-Between Cataclysmic Events", with Superman portrayed by Tyler Hoechlin.

== Plot ==
In 1946, the Lees, a Chinese-American family, move from Chinatown to the Metropolis suburbs in the wake of World War II after the father, Dr. Lee, starts a new job at the Metropolis Health Department. The family faces "overt and subtle racism as they settle into their new community" and the book focuses on the children, Tommy and Roberta (Roberta's real name is Lan-Shin, but she uses the name Roberta "for the ease of the white people around her"). "While Tommy joins a local baseball team and uses self-deprecating remarks to make friends (referring to his family as 'wontons' to his white peers), Roberta struggles to fit in". The family is targeted by the local chapter of the Ku Klux Klan, who burn a cross on their lawn and attempt to firebomb their house. Dr. Lee "tries to distance his Chinese family from the black men who helped them in the aftermath of a Klan attack for fear of being grouped in with them".

Tommy and Roberta find themselves increasingly threatened while new friends such as Jimmy Olsen, Lois Lane, and Inspector Henderson try to help them and are similarly targeted. Meanwhile, Superman's own efforts to assist the children are complicated by disturbing visions that prove to be linked to his own self-doubt and his confusion about his own self-identity.

== Development ==
Superman Smashes the Klan is loosely based on a 16-part episode story-arc, "Clan of the Fiery Cross", from the radio serial Adventures of Superman which ran from June to July 1946. In the radio serial, "Superman exposed Ku Klux Klan codewords, rituals, and its bigotry—all based on intel collected by activist Stetson Kennedy—before a national audience. The show damaged the group's reputation and led to a steep decline in membership from which the KKK never recovered".

In an interview with Inverse, Yang stated that "the Klan didn't disappear. Though a fraction of what it was then, the ideas driving the Klan seem to be making a resurgence", adding that pushed him to revisit Superman's original battle with American bigotry: "Superman Smashes the Klan is my attempt to talk about these modern issues in an old context".

Yang learned about the radio serial in Freakonomics (2005) by Steven Levitt and Stephen J. Dubner. Yang stated that the book brought "it up because it had a real-world effect. For fanboys like me who are criticized for having our heads in other universes, this was a great example of a guy in a cape that had a real, positive effect on the world". Yang said: "I remember talking to my son about it after I read it, and the next time we were at the library we found a book on it, called 'Superman vs. the KKK'. It was fascinating. At the center of it was this Chinese-American family that moves into Metropolis. I'm Chinese-American, and I grew up in the 1980s and read Superman comics, but I don't really remember seeing a lot of folks who looked like me in those stories". Yang also highlighted the immigration connection with both Superman and the Chinese-American family.

== Reception ==
Superman Smashes the Klan was the 2020 Harvey Awards winner for Best Children or Young Adult Book, was the awarded the Mike Wieringo Spirit Award at the 2020 Ringo Awards and won both Best Publication for Kids and Best Adaptation from Another Medium at the 2021 Eisner Awards.

Reviews were positive, especially with regards to its message and themes. Pierce Lydon of Newsarama praised Gene Luen Yang for exploring the "subtle and insidious ways that prejudice shows up in our everyday life". Rory Wilding of AIPT Comics said the series "succeeds as a positive and somewhat educational adventure about the acceptance of others". Sheraz Farooqi, for Newsweek, wrote that "a poignant moment in the story comes when a member of the Klan is cheerful of Superman's powers, taking it as a sign of white supremacy. This ultimately is the catalyst for Superman to reveal himself as an alien to the rest of the world, unashamed of not being a human".

Hillary Chute, for The New York Times, highlighted that all of the characters, including racist characters, "feel complex". Chute wrote that "while it suggests the similarity between the 'alien element' of nonwhites and the alien Superman, the book also confronts how Superman has been interpreted as a white-supremacist Übermensch, and how his visual presence has in the past been co-opted by the intolerant. In other words—as it also does in confronting racism against African-Americans, including by Asians—the book tackles perhaps predictable conflicts, but then deepens with every turn".

The A.V. Club highlighted that the book weaves personal stories within the historical context and tackles a lot of concepts "for a middle-grade book, from the capitalist roots of the Klan to immigration, but the creative team does it all with grace and careful intention. Even the character design feels thoughtful, as antagonists are drawn without many of the classic markers of villainy, making it clear that physical appearance has nothing to do with risks people pose. If readers didn't already have the foundation of Superman, they might be overwhelmed by all that, but because they enter Superman Smashes The Klan with clear expectations of who is right and what is wrong, they have more emotional and intellectual energy to absorb and process all of it".

Reviews of the artwork were also positive. The A.V. Club highlighted Gurihiru's "very animated, kid-friendly art style" and The New York Times stated that "the vibrant visual world is controlled and inviting. Despite the hilarity of Superman's enormous, almost frame-breaking body, Gurihiru's cross-cultural artistic approach avoids the gimmicky". The Washington Post wrote that the art "does a stellar job of heightening the story's drama". Entertainment Weekly highlighted that "Gurihiru's art pays tribute to the 40s fashion that listeners of the original radio broadcast would have been wearing, while also creating a timeless aesthetic".

Superman Smashes the Klan was #1 on CBR's "10 Best DC Comics Of 2020" list – the article highlights that "the backmatter, in which personal experience with racism as he grew up, enhances the comic and brings a much needed real-world aspect to things". The backmatter essay by Yang was also published in Publishers Weekly and was their 15th "most-read articles on comics and graphic novels" in 2020.

=== Sales ===
The trade paperback edition of Superman Smashes The Klan made the Top 20 Direct Market Graphic Novels charts for Q2 2020: #5 in units sold and #10 in dollars invoiced. Per ICv2, these rankings are "based on sales tracked at point-of-sale by the ComicHub system at stores selling American comics around the world. During the period for which these reports were generated, there were roughly 85 stores using the ComicHub system ... These rankings may not be typical for all stores, but do represent a variety of locations and store emphases. And for the first time, these sales rankings represent actual sales to consumers during the period, not sales to stores". ComicsBeat highlighted that DC's move away from Diamond to new distributors has ended the sales charts as the industry knew them and since these new distributors have not published sales charts, ICv2 "has done something long threatened and run charts for both periodicals and graphic novels sales based on ComicHub's point of sale information. ... 85 stores is a very small sample, but it is a sample and it's all we have for now. ... I should note that industry observers I contacted are united in questioning the usefulness of charts that are such a small sample size".

== In other media ==
The opening sequence of Superman Smashes the Klan, where Superman fights the Nazi Atom Man, was loosely adapted in the Superman & Lois episode "A Brief Reminiscence In-Between Cataclysmic Events", with Superman portrayed by Tyler Hoechlin, and Atom Man portrayed by Paul Lazenby.
