= Avatar: The Last Airbender – The Rift =

2014 graphic novel

- Avatar: The Last Airbender – The Rift, Part 1 cover
- Date: March 5, 2014 (Part 1); July 29, 2014 (Part 2); November 18, 2014 (Part 3)
- No. of issues: 3
- Publisher: Dark Horse Comics

Creative team
- Writers: Gene Yang
- Artists: Studio Gurihiru
- Pencillers: Chifuyu Sasaki
- Inkers: Chifuyu Sasaki
- Letterers: Michael Heisler
- Colourists: Naoko Kawano
- Creators: Michael Dante DiMartino; Bryan Konietzko
- Editors: Dave Marshall

Original publication
- Published in: Avatar: The Last Airbender
- ISBN: 9781616552954 (Part One); 9781616552961 (Part Two); 9781616552978 (Part Three); 9781616555504 (Library edition)

Chronology
- Preceded by: The Search (comic)
- Followed by: Smoke and Shadow (comic)

Avatar: The Last Airbender – The Rift is a graphic novel in three parts, written by Gene Yang and illustrated by Studio Gurihiru. It is a continuation of Avatar: The Last Airbender and a prequel to The Legend of Korra, both animated TV series created by Michael Dante DiMartino and Bryan Konietzko. Part 1 was released on March 5, 2014, Part 2 was released on July 29, 2014, and Part 3 was released on November 18, 2014. It takes place after the events of the graphic novel Avatar: The Last Airbender – The Search. It is followed by the Smoke and Shadow trilogy.

== Overview ==
The Rift shifts the focus back to a 114-year-old Avatar Aang as he begins the process of creating Republic City, in contrast to The Search, which is more focused on the story of the Fire Nation royal family. Aang also plans to give a larger role to Toph, who was absent from The Search trilogy. It is followed by Smoke and Shadow.

As Avatar Aang and his friends are preparing for Yangchen's Festival, an Air Nomad holiday that hasn't been celebrated in over a century, Aang starts receiving cryptic visits from the spirit of Avatar Yangchen herself. When these visits lead Aang to a refinery operating on the Air Nomads’ sacred land, the gang suspects that the refinery is responsible for polluting a nearby river. The gang decide to investigate the matter and quickly find themselves in a dangerous encounter with a malevolent spirit bent on destroying the human world.

=== Part One ===
At a banquet celebrating the formation of Yu Dao's new coalition government, Aang has a vision of Avatar Yangchen, the previous Air Nomad Avatar, and is inspired to celebrate Yangchen's Festival, a holiday honoring Yangchen's supposed defeat of a powerful dark spirit. He brings Katara, Sokka, Toph and the Air Acolytes along, but tensions soon start to form between Aang and Toph, after Aang's insistence of following a tradition of the festival despite not knowing its purpose reminds Toph of her life with her controlling father.

Proceeding with the festival, the group discover, much to Aang's horror, that a town with a large crystal refinery has been built over a meadow where the next stage of Yangchen's Festival traditionally took place, despite the land being sacred to the Air Nomads. Exploring with the refinery's engineer, Satoru, whom Toph soon develops a crush on, the group discover that it utilises both new technologies as well as three of the world's bending styles, making it the first joint business venture between nations in the Avatar world. Aang becomes concerned that a nearby river has been polluted by the refinery, and continues to see visions of Yangchen, which convince him of impending danger resulting from the refinery's construction.

When Aang tries to voice his concerns, an argument starts between him and Toph; Aang is upset that the refinery and town have been built on sacred ground, while Toph, impressed by the innovations, multicultural nature and prosperity of the refinery, has no issue with its presence. Furthermore, she dismisses Aang's warnings about his visions on the basis that he does not know exactly what is going to happen. When Aang points out the nearby pollution, Toph confirms Satoru's claim that the refinery is not responsible, causing Aang to suggest Toph is lying to protect her crush. The argument is brought to a stop when a series of earthquakes threaten the lives of the refinery's workers, and prompts Aang and Toph to work together to prevent anyone from getting hurt and minimize damage to the refinery.

After the danger is over, Toph suggests that Aang is trying too hard to hold onto the past, prompting Aang to suggest that Toph is trying too hard to run away from it, to which Toph claims that she has no choice. At that moment, the refinery's owners—Satoru's uncle Loban, and Toph's father Lao Beifong arrive on the scene, and Part One ends with Toph and Lao recognizing one another.

=== Part Two ===
Lao claims that Toph is not his daughter, and tries to have her, Aang and their friends escorted out of the refinery. After a battle with the Rough Rhinos, a group of former Fire Nation soldiers now serving as the refinery's security, the group go their separate ways; Aang, originally intending to confront Lao and Loban about the refinery's construction, is persuaded by the Air Acolytes to continue celebrating Yangchen's Festival. Toph resolves to confront her father, while Katara and Sokka decide to explore a hidden cave unveiled during the battle with the Rough Rhinos. Traveling through it, they discover that it leads to an underground iron mine, which is revealed to be the source of both the earthquakes and the pollution.

During a ceremonial meal, Aang is able to contact the spirit of Yangchen, who reveals that in the past she fought with a powerful spirit called General Old Iron, to prevent him from destroying a city that once stood in the refinery's present location. Old Iron initially sought to wipe out the humans, believing that they would threaten the existence of the spirits if left unchecked but was talked out of it by his friend and fellow spirit Lady Tienhai. After Lady Tienhai's death, which was said to have come about as a result of the humans of the city, General Old Iron sought to avenge her by destroying the city, but Yangchen made a deal with him that stopped him from doing so. Before she can explain the terms of the deal, another earthquake disrupts the ceremonial meal, causing the vision to end.

Elsewhere, Toph talks with her father, telling him about her role in training and helping Aang in an attempt to make him see her for who she really is, but after he makes no response, she decides to have nothing more to do with him. At that moment, Sokka arrives to try and convince Lao to evacuate the iron mine, which is dangerously unsafe. It emerges that Lao knew nothing about the iron mine; Loban has been operating it in secret after Lao felt that extracting the iron would be too dangerous. As they attempt to evacuate the workers, they are attacked by a member of the Rough Rhinos, causing a cave-in that leaves almost everyone trapped in the mine. Toph manages to save the group from being crushed to death with her earthbending and metalbending, but she is unable to move the vast amount of earth away from them, and Aang, who is still above ground, is unable to help her, due to large amounts of iron ore mixed in with the earth that he is unable to move with his earthbending.

=== Part Three ===
The people trapped in the mine are saved by the efforts of Aang, Toph, and her metalbending students Ho Tun, Penga, and The Dark One. Before they arrive, Lao makes amends with Toph, apologizing for all his past actions. During the rescue, it is revealed that the iron ore is in fact General Old Iron's armour, which he discarded after making his deal with Yangchen. Loban, finding that all the iron has been dug up, attempts to escape to the Fire Nation with it. At that moment, a storm begins to develop.

Aang attempts to get back in contact with Yangchen via the ceremonial meal, but discovers that a vase crucial to the ceremony was destroyed in the earthquake. Remembering her words from before, Aang reconnects with Avatar Roku, reconciling with him in the process, and is able to talk to Yangchen, who explains the full terms of her deal with General Old Iron; in exchange for the spirit leaving the humans alone, Yangchen would create a memorial for Lady Tienhai, restore the land to its natural state and keep it free from human civilization, in order to prove that humans could preserve and protect. Yangchen set up the festival to ensure that her end of the bargain would be upheld even after her death. Yangchen states that with the deal now broken, Old Iron will return to wipe out humanity.

Aang prepares to destroy the refinery and the surrounding town, believing that doing so will reinstate the deal and convince Old Iron to leave, but he is stopped by Toph and her students, who assume that Aang is again trying to hold on to the past at the expense of the future. The two of them fight, but they are interrupted by the arrival of General Old Iron, prompting Toph to team up with Aang to fight him. Toph and her students use their metalbending to strip Old Iron of his armour, and Aang lands a fatal wound on the spirit in a desperate attempt to stop him from killing Toph. As he fades away, General Old Iron laments on how there is no longer a place for spirits in the world, and that the Avatar will always side with humans against the spirits, being a human himself. Declaring that it is human nature to dominate, Old Iron nevertheless acknowledges his defeat at Aang's hands, before dissipating. Toph thanks and hugs Aang for saving her and her students, while Loban, who was nearly killed due to his greed during General Old Iron's return, reconciles with Satoru. Lao convinces the rest of the refinery's workers to stay with him and rebuild.

Aang is troubled by Old Iron's words, but Katara assures him that if he has a place in the world's future, the spirits must have one as well. While visiting the remains of Lady Tienhai's memorial shortly afterwards, Aang is visited by the reincarnated Lady Tienhai, who had enjoyed watching the humans of her time develop the old city, being impressed by their creativity and ingenuity. Eventually, she fell in love with the prince of the city, and took on a permanent human form to be with him; her "death" was simply her mortal body passing away of old age, after which she was reincarnated. She claims that, contrary to Old Iron's beliefs, it is human nature to create, not to dominate, and that there will always be a place in the world for spirits as long as humans are willing to create it. She further assures Aang of her belief in an eventual human civilization that can preserve and protect, even as it grows.

Finally understanding the balance between preservation and evolution, Aang recreates Yangchen's Festival as the new Spirit's Friendship Festival. Team Avatar and the Acolytes, merrily participate along with the townspeople three months later.
