= Avatar: The Last Airbender – North and South =

Fifth graphic novel in the Airbender trilogy

- Avatar: The Last Airbender – North and South, Part 1 cover
- Date: September 28, 2016 (Part 1); February 7, 2017 (Part 2); April 26, 2017 (Part 3)
- Publisher: Dark Horse Comics

Creative team
- Writers: Gene Yang
- Artists: Studio Gurihiru
- Pencillers: Chifuyu Sasaki
- Inkers: Chifuyu Sasaki
- Letterers: Michael Heisler
- Colourists: Naoko Kawano
- Creators: Michael Dante DiMartino; Bryan Konietzko
- Editors: Dave Marshall

Original publication
- Published in: Avatar: The Last Airbender
- ISBN: 9781506700229 (Part One); 9781506701295 (Part Two); 9781506701301 (Part Three); 9781506701950 (Library edition)

Chronology
- Preceded by: Smoke and Shadow (comic)
- Followed by: Imbalance (comic)

Avatar: The Last Airbender – North and South is the fifth graphic novel trilogy created as a continuation of Avatar: The Last Airbender television series created by Michael Dante DiMartino and Bryan Konietzko. The first comic in the trilogy was published on September 28, 2016, the second on February 7, 2017, and the final one on April 26, 2017.

The trilogy is set following the events of Smoke and Shadow. As a close sequel to the original Avatar series, it depicts events that occur seventy years before the sequel series The Legend of Korra. In early June 2017, the artist team Gurihiru, who drew the first five stories, announced that Avatar: The Last Airbender – North and South was their last story. In 2018, Faith Erin Hicks took over as writer with Peter Wartman as artist for the next graphic novel trilogy, Avatar: The Last Airbender – Imbalance.

== Plot ==
=== Part One ===
After she dreams of their late mother Kya, Katara and Sokka, now fifteen and sixteen years old, return to their home village in the Southern Water Tribe, discovering that it has been transformed into a bustling and thriving city reminiscent of the Northern Water Tribe, and that their father Hakoda has been elected leader of the entire south. Though Sokka is enthusiastic at the changes, Katara fears that their tribe is losing its cultural identity. While dining out with Malina and her brother Maliq, the northerners in charge of the redevelopment process, thieves steal a briefcase containing important documents from Maliq, with Malina getting injured in the struggle.

Katara and Sokka follow the thieves to a secret hideout in an abandoned shipwreck occupied by a group of southern nationalists, who resent the northern tribe's imposition of their values onto the southern tribe, as well as Hakoda's complicity in the matter. Their leader, Gilak, who fought alongside Hakoda over the course of the Hundred-Year War, expresses his belief that Malina and Maliq have a hidden agenda before Katara and Sokka escape the group and return to the city. During their escape, the pair run into Thod, Gilak's second in command, who tells them of a story of a snow rat with the ability to talk and walk on two feet who endeared himself to a human tribe, only to be driven away by them when he asked to be treated as an equal. The siblings and Maliq enter the tent where Malina is recovering with Hakoda by her side, only to discover the pair of them kissing.

=== Part Two ===
Hakoda investigates the nationalists' hideout, only to discover it abandoned with a note informing him that he will soon see the truth. Elsewhere, Katara and Sokka learn from Malina and Maliq that, as part of the redevelopment process, they will be extracting from a massive oil reservoir recently discovered in the Southern Water Tribe, in order to enable a new age of machinery in which machines become part of everyday life. Katara continues to have issues with Malina and her relationship with Hakoda, owing to her plans and unintentionally offensive remarks towards the South. Further conversation reveals that Malina and Maliq are business partners of Toph's father, with Toph herself later arriving as a representative of her father.

At a festival thrown by Malina and Maliq, Katara and Sokka meet up with Aang, who has returned from helping to solve the crisis in the Fire Nation. As Malina makes a speech about her plans, the festival is attacked by Gilak's nationalists, with Gilak accusing her and Maliq of attempting to seize the oil for the Northern Water Tribe, in order to make the Southern Tribe a puppet state of the North. As proof, he cites the documents that were stolen from Maliq. Malina admits that she had originally planned to give the oil to the North, out of fear the South would be unable to handle it properly but changed her mind upon meeting Hakoda and seeing that the South was capable of doing so. Maliq however insists that they carry on with the original plan, decrying the South as culturally backward and incapable of governing itself, let alone managing the oil.

Malina agrees to step down from the redevelopment project and leave the South Pole with all her people in an attempt to defuse the situation, but Gilak and the nationalists attack. In the ensuing battle, Thod reminds Katara of the story he told her, comparing the humans' treatment of the snow rat to the North's low opinion of the South, to convince her to join Gilak, but she refuses. Later on, Hakoda attempts to persuade Gilak to give up his crusade, but Gilak stabs Hakoda in the chest before he and his men are captured. The night following the battle, Sokka and Katara briefly argue over the South's future, Sokka pointing out that Malina and Maliq's plan of using the oil has merits, Katara unwilling to allow the South to lose its cultural identity. Elsewhere, as Gilak sits in his prison cell, one of Hakoda's officers, Lirin, smuggles him the key to his cell door under a bowl of prison food, having been convinced of his opinions.

=== Part Three ===
To continue the redevelopment of the South, Toph brings her metalbending students over to help with construction, while Hakoda invites Fire Lord Zuko and Earth King Kuei over to discuss a collaborative reconstruction effort between the three nations. The meeting is interrupted when Gilak and his nationalists escape their imprisonment and force their way into the meeting room, kidnapping Kuei during the subsequent fight. Gilak, who by now considers Hakoda a traitor to the South due to his willingness to collaborate with foreigners, demands that Hakoda turn himself over in exchange for Kuei's return.

The two groups meet at the Bridge of No Return, a rope bridge once used to exile Southern Water Tribe criminals. As part of the exchange agreement, Aang, Katara, Toph, and Zuko agree to be chi-blocked by the nationalists before Hakoda and Kuei are sent across the bridge. Once the two men are in the middle of the bridge, Gilak attempts to collapse it and kill them both, but he is foiled by Malina and Toph's metalbending students, who had sneaked over to the other side of the bridge prior to the exchange. Aang, Katara, and Toph then subdue the nationalists on their side of the bridge, having used chainmail armor designed by Sokka and the metalbending students to avoid being chi-blocked.

His forces beaten, Gilak destroys the bridge in order to kill Hakoda, while Malina tries to stop him. Aang barely manages to carry the three of them whilst flying his glider, but Gilak's attempts to kill Hakoda cause him to lose his grip and fall to his death. Fearing that Aang will not be able to carry both her and Hakoda, Malina attempts to sacrifice herself for the other two by letting go of Hakoda's hand, professing her love for him as she does so, but she is saved by Katara.

The next day, Katara and Sokka visit their mother Kya's grave, and Katara admits that her ideal Southern Water Tribe would be one where her beloved mother was still alive. She then states that she has felt her mother's spirit support her last night, and on her previous adventures, and with this belief that her mother has been with her all along, she is subsequently able to accept the changes happening in the South more easily. The characters then meet up in Gran-Gran's hut for a feast that includes cuisine from all the cultures of all four nations.
