= Gurihiru =

Japanese illustration team

Gurihiru グリヒル
- Born: Chifuyu Sasaki; Naoko Kawano
- Areas: Artists, cartoonists
- Pseudonyms: Illustrator Unit Gurihiru; Gurihiru Studios
- Notable works: Avatar: The Last Airbender graphic novels, Sonic Unleashed, The Unbelievable Gwenpool, The Unstoppable Wasp, Superman Smashes the Klan, It's Jeff!
- Awards: 2020 Harvey Award (Superman Smashes the Klan for Best Children or Young Adult Book); 2021 Eisner Awards (Superman Smashes the Klan for both Best Publication for Kids and Best Adaptation from Another Medium)

Gurihiru (Japanese: グリヒル), also credited as Illustrator Unit Gurihiru and Gurihiru Studios, is a Japanese illustration duo, consisting of Chifuyu Sasaki (workplan design, pencils, inks) and Naoko Kawano (workplan design, colors, webdesign). Both originating from Sapporo, Japan, they are currently based in Saitama, mainly working as artists for American comics.

The two women are art school graduates who worked as web designers and art museum receptionists prior to their work in comics. After winning 2nd place in a manga competition, they were advised by the organizer of the contest that their art style didn't fit the Japanese market. They decided to try the American market and have since illustrated many American comics and graphic novels.

== Work ==
The pair have worked on several Marvel Comics titles, such as Power Pack, Fantastic Four, Gus Beezer & Spider Man, and The Unbelievable Gwenpool. They have also worked on the Avatar: The Last Airbender comic series with writer Gene Luen Yang, beginning in 2012 with The Promise and ending their run in 2017 with North and South. Their game credits include human character design for Sega's game Sonic Unleashed (2008) and its accompanying 3DCG short Sonic: Night of the Werehog, and character design for Bandai Namco Entertainment's game Treasure Report: The Mechanized Legacy (2011). They were also in charge of illustrating flyers for the Kansai comedy troupe Gekidan HikoHiko.

In 2019, Gurihiru began illustrating the limited series Superman Smashes the Klan, with writer Yang, which was loosely based on the 1946 The Adventures of Superman radio show's story-arc, "Clan of the Fiery Cross". The New York Times review of the Superman Smashes the Klan trade paperback stated, "Gurihiru's rendering is a mash-up that pairs contemporary Japanese manga, with its conventional large eyes, and clean-lined, charmingly retro figuration reminiscent of the Fleischer Studios Superman cartoons of the early 1940s, full of striking, often dreamy swaths of uncluttered color. Weirdly, it works. The vibrant visual world is controlled and inviting. Despite the hilarity of Superman's enormous, almost frame-breaking body, Gurihiru's cross-cultural artistic approach avoids the gimmicky". Superman Smashes the Klan was the 2020 Harvey Awards winner for Best Children or Young Adult Book. It also won both Best Publication for Kids and Best Adaptation from Another Medium at the 2021 Eisner Awards.

In December 2020, Kelly Thompson teased a new 2021 Marvel project with Gurihiru by releasing an image of Jeff the Land Shark – Jeff was introduced in Thompson's West Coast Avengers (2018) as Gwenpool's pet – created by the artists. It's Jeff! (2021), a silent humor comic by Thompson and Gurihiru, then premiered as part of the new Marvel's Infinity Comics program in September 2021; these digital comics are in the vertical scrolling format and are only available to Marvel Unlimited subscribers. Graeme McMillan, for Polygon, commented that of the new Infinity Comics, It's Jeff! "is pretty perfect from the start" and "an utter joy" unlike the rest of the line. Jim Dandeneau, for Den of Geek, wrote that It's Jeff! is "almost completely wordless, but the story, the emotion and the punchlines are all brilliantly conveyed by Gurihiru's art". It was nominated for Best Digital Comic at the 2022 Eisner Awards. A second season of It's Jeff! returned in September 2022. Jeff, with Carol Danvers, was featured on the variant cover of Captain Marvel #39 with art by Gurihiru; this version was exclusive to Marvel Unlimited Annual Plus subscribers who attended San Diego Comic-Con in July 2022. Gurihiru then did two more variant covers, Captain Marvel #42 and Captain America: Symbol of Truth #6, which feature Jeff in October 2022. The first season was released in print in March 2023 as a one-shot issue. Hannah Rose, for CBR, commented that "Gurihiru's sweet art style, with chalky, thin pencil-like lines, soft colors and papery textures, given depth by gentle lighting and subtle black placement, is allowed to speak for itself, making It's Jeff! #1 feel like a fulfilling and complete read".

On their portrayal of Loki in the limited series Thor & Loki: Double Trouble (2021), Susana Polo, for Polygon, wrote: "I love love love Gurihiru's rendering of Loki in this second issue of Thor & Loki: Double Trouble. Incredible. Show-stopping. I could barely decide which panel was best". Comic Watch highlighted, "staying true to their style, Gurihiru's art is wholly exaggerated and energetic, deceptively simple, and on the whole incredibly cute. As with the previous Double Trouble title (and Superman Smashes the Klan), the art from Gurihiru is a terrific fit for a book aimed at younger readers. [...] The character designs for both Thor and Loki are delightful, perhaps even upstaging Gurihiru's designs for Spider-Man and Venom in the previous book". Also in 2021, Gurihiru once again partnered with Yang for the short story "The Monkey Prince Hates Superheroes" in the anthology DC Festival of Heroes: The Asian Superhero Celebration (2021).

In May 2022, it was announced that Gurihiru were the artists, with writer Samuel Sattin, on an English-language manga Unico: Awakening (Japanese: ユニコ: 目覚めのおはなし) which is a reimagining of "The Cat on the Broomstick" story arc from Osamu Tezuka's Unico. Tezuka Productions launched a Kickstarter that month to fund the project, which was fully funded within one day. The manga will be produced in both English and Japanese. On September 20, 2023, it was announced that the new Unico manga series would run for a total of 4 volumes with Scholastic Corporation publishing the series from its Graphix imprint label including a handbook. On October 27, 2023, Tezuka Productions announced the series to be given a worldwide release with De Fontein publishing the series in the Netherlands.

== Awards and nominations ==
Year	Work	Award	Category	Result	Ref.
2020	Superman Smashes the Klan	Harvey Award	Best Children or Young Adult Book	Won	
2021	Superman Smashes the Klan	Eisner Award	Best Publication for Kids	Won	
2021	Superman Smashes the Klan	Eisner Award	Best Adaptation from Another Medium	Won	
2022	It's Jeff! (2021)	Eisner Award	Best Digital Comic	Nominated	
2024	It's Jeff: The Jeff-Verse #1	Eisner Award	Best Humor Publication	Won	

== Bibliography ==
=== DC Comics ===
- Superman Smashes the Klan #1–3 (2019–20)
  - Superman Smashes the Klan (TPB, 240 pages, 2020, ISBN 9781779504210)
- "The Monkey Prince Hates Superheroes", DC Festival of Heroes: The Asian Superhero Celebration anthology (2021)

=== Marvel Comics ===
- Marvelous Adventures of Gus Beezer & Spider-Man #1 (2004)
- Power Pack #1–4 (2005)
- X-Men and Power Pack #1–4 (2005-2006)
- Avengers and Power Pack Assemble! #1–4 (2006)
- Spider-Man and Power Pack #1–4 (2006–07)
- Fantastic Four and Power Pack #1–4 (2007)
- Iron Man and Power Pack #1–4 (2007–08)
- Power Pack: Day One #1–4 (2008)
- Wolverine and Power Pack #1–2, 4 (2008–09)
- Tails of the Pet Avengers 1 #1–2 (2009)
- Thor and the Warriors Four #1–4 (2010)
- Captain America: The Fighting Avenger #1 (2011)
- A-Babies vs. X-Babies #1 (2012)
- The Unbelievable Gwenpool #0–4, 7–10, 12–13, 16–20, 24–25 (2016–18)
- Avengers and Power Pack Assemble! #1–8 (2017)
- Fantastic Four and Power Pack #1–8 (2018)
- The Unstoppable Wasp, vol. 2, #1–5, 8–10 (2018–19)
- Gwenpool Strikes Back #1 (variant cover; 2019)
- Power Pack: Grow Up! #1 (2019)
- Spider-Man & Venom: Double Trouble #1–4 (2019–20)
- The Rise of Ultraman #1 (2020)
- Heroes at Home webcomic (2020)
- Thor & Loki: Double Trouble #1–4 (2021)
- The Trials of Ultraman #1 (2021)
- Demon Days: X-Men #1 (cover; 2021)
- It's Jeff! Infinity Comic – Season One (2021), Season Two (2022), Season Three (2023–2024), Season Four (2024–present)
  - It's Jeff: Jeff-Verse (TPB, 128 pages, 2025, ISBN 9781302961695)
- Gwenpool #1 (variant cover; 2025)

=== Dark Horse Comics ===
- Avatar: The Last Airbender – The Promise (2012)
- Avatar: The Last Airbender – The Search (2013)
- Avatar: The Last Airbender – The Rift (2014)
- Avatar: The Last Airbender – Smoke and Shadow (2015–16)
- Avatar: The Last Airbender – North and South (2016–17)
- Disney / Pixar The Incredibles 2: Crisis in Mid-Life! & Other Stories #1–3 (2018)

=== Lucasfilm ===
- Star Wars English–Japanese Dictionary for Padawan Learners (Gakken Marketing, 2014)
- Star Wars English–Japanese Dictionary for Jedi Knights (Gakken Marketing, 2015)
- Star Wars English–Japanese Dictionary for Jedi Masters (Gakken Marketing, 2016)
- Star Wars: Papa wa Dāsu Beidā ni Natta ("Star Wars: My Papa Became Darth Vader") (Kodansha, 2019)

=== Tezuka Productions ===
- Unico: Awakening (ユニコ: 目覚めのおはなし) (2024-ongoing)
- Unico: Hunted (2025)
