= Avatar: The Last Airbender – The Search =

2013 graphic novel

- Avatar: The Last Airbender – The Search, Part 1 cover
- Date: March 20, 2013 (Part 1); July 10, 2013 (Part 2); October 30, 2013 (Part 3)
- Publisher: Dark Horse Comics

Creative team
- Writers: Gene Yang
- Artists: Studio Gurihiru
- Pencillers: Chifuyu Sasaki
- Inkers: Chifuyu Sasaki
- Letterers: Michael Heisler
- Colourists: Naoko Kawano
- Creators: Michael Dante DiMartino; Bryan Konietzko
- Editors: Dave Marshall

Original publication
- Published in: Avatar: The Last Airbender
- ISBN: 9781616550547 (Part One); 9781616551902 (Part Two); 9781616551841 (Part Three); 9781616552268 (Library edition); 9781506721729 (Omnibus)

Chronology
- Preceded by: The Promise (comic)
- Followed by: The Rift (comic)

Avatar: The Last Airbender – The Search is a graphic novel, written by Gene Yang and illustrated by Studio Gurihiru that was released in three parts throughout 2013. It is a continuation of Avatar: The Last Airbender and a prequel to The Legend of Korra, both of which are animated TV series created by Michael Dante DiMartino and Bryan Konietzko. It takes place after the events of the graphic novel Avatar: The Last Airbender – The Promise. It is followed by a sequel, Avatar: The Last Airbender – The Rift.

== Overview ==
The Search focuses on the mystery surrounding Zuko and Azula's long-lost mother, Ursa. It reveals the details of former Princess Azula's imprisonment in a Fire Nation mental institution and the complexities of Fire Lord Ozai and Ursa's relationship.

The main characters are the members of the Fire Nation family, particularly Zuko and Azula. Avatar Aang, Sokka, and Katara help the Fire Nation siblings to find their long lost mother.

Gene Yang noted that the series would focus more on the supernatural side of the Avatar world.

== Plot ==
=== Part One ===
Two mysterious figures are talking to each other with one wanting to know everything the other one knows.

In the past, Ursa accepts a marriage proposal from her boyfriend Ikem, then a member of an acting troupe in the Fire Nation town of Hira'a. Shortly after receiving the proposal, however, she is forcibly engaged to Ozai, then a Fire Prince. Ikem attempts to stop Ursa leaving, but she lies about willingly accepting Ozai's proposal in order to prevent Ozai from killing him. During the wedding, Ozai forbids Ursa from contacting her old family or her past acquaintances.

In the present, Zuko hears a philosophical saying that a ruler can easily handle their nation if they properly handled their own family. He decides to bring Azula to Ozai's cell in the hope of encouraging them to talk to one another. Azula, now completely insane, believes that Ursa has been actively working to bring her down, and is responsible for all the events that led to her defeat. Acting on information from Ozai, Azula escapes custody and lets Zuko chase her to one of Ozai's secret chambers in the royal palace, where she burns a number of letters that Ursa had written. Azula offers to tell Zuko what was written in the letters, on the condition that he lets her accompany him on his search for Ursa. Zuko reluctantly complies, and convinces Aang, Katara and Sokka to travel with him, in order to keep Azula in line. The group travel to Hira'a.

Near the end of the journey, Azula attempts to flee the group, but experiences a hallucination of her mother. She tells the hallucination that thanks to Ozai, she has evidence that she can use to overthrow Zuko and become Fire Lord in his place, and intends to kill Ursa to prevent her interference. After she is restrained by Katara, the group is attacked by a giant wolf spirit. With the spirit overwhelming them, Azula convinces Zuko to free her, and lures it away with her lightning generation. That night, Zuko discovers that Azula's evidence is a letter from Ursa to Ikem, which claims that he is in fact Ikem's son. In the past, it is shown that Ozai had intercepted the letter after Ursa attempted to send it to Ikem.

=== Part Two ===
In the past, Ozai hires a Yuyan Archer named Vachir to kill Ikem. Returning to Ozai several months later after failing to complete his mission, Vachir tells him that Ikem fled into a nearby forest known for its violent plant and animal life, and that he is likely already dead as a result. Confronting Ursa over both her communication with Ikem and her infidelity, Ozai states that he will allow Zuko to live despite his heritage, but claims to have had Ikem killed, much to Ursa's horror.

In the present day, Azula discovers the disappearance of the letter and attacks Zuko, believing that Ursa told him to steal the letter from her. The two siblings fight until Azula realizes that, despite having the letter in his possession, Zuko hasn't taken the opportunity to destroy it. Zuko allows his sister to keep the letter. Entering Hira'a to ask for information on Ursa, Zuko and the others meet Noren, the director of the Hira'a Acting Troupe that Ursa and Ikem were once a part of, and his wife Noriko. The couple say that following Ursa's engagement to Ozai, Ikem headed into Forgetful Valley, a forest in a canyon that heartbroken people supposedly travel to in order to forget their pasts and that when Ursa supposedly returned to Hira'a few years later, she travelled into Forgetful Valley as well. Noren and Noriko claim that no one who has entered the valley has returned. Aang advises Zuko to forget about Ikem and destroy Ursa's letter, not wanting Zuko to lose his position as Fire Lord because of the new era he represents, but Zuko decides to travel to Forgetful Valley regardless.

In a second flashback, Ursa learnt from Azula that Ozai's father, Fire Lord Azulon, had ordered his son to kill Zuko as punishment for Ozai asking to be made heir to the throne, following the death of Iroh's son Lu Ten in the siege of Ba Sing Se. Discovering Ozai compliant with Azulon's demand, Ursa offered to provide him with an untraceable poison which he could use to kill Azulon and become Fire Lord in his place. Ozai agreed, on the condition that Ursa would leave the city and never return, no longer trusting her not to poison him. As a second condition, Ozai forced Ursa to leave Azula and Zuko behind in order to use them as collateral against her.

Travelling to Forgetful Valley in the present, the group encounter Misu and Rafa, siblings from the Northern Water Tribe. Misu explains that they are trying to find a spirit with the power to give people new faces, in order to heal an undisclosed disfigurement of Rafa's. Learning that the spirit appears at one of four pools of water selected by the wolf spirit that had attacked the group earlier, Aang manages to find her, discovering that she is known as The Mother of Faces. Azula attacks Misu and Rafa, believing that Ursa has sent them to slow her down.

=== Part Three ===
In the past, Ursa returns to Hira'a and meets Noren, who reveals himself to be Ikem. Ikem explains that he had disappeared into Forgetful Valley after becoming unable to live with the sorrowful treatment he received from all the townspeople as a result of Ursa's disappearance. While there, he encountered the Mother of Faces, who gave him the face of Noren, allowing him to return to Hira'a and live there in the anonymity that he desired. He offers to take Ursa to receive a new face.

In the present, Azula battles with the rest of the group before Aang rejoins them, having convinced the Mother of Faces to travel to the pool at which the group is assembled, rather than the one selected by the wolf. The spirit agrees to grant one request from the group before disappearing for the rest of the season. Zuko intends to let Misu ask the Mother of Faces to help Rafa, but before he can do so, Azula demands that the spirit reveal where Ursa is. The Mother of Faces says that Ursa had visited her years ago to receive a new face, which she reveals to be that of Noriko. Realizing that Noriko is really Ursa, Azula leaves to kill her, with Zuko and Sokka following her.

Having granted her customary one request, the Mother of Faces prepares to depart, despite Misu and Aang's efforts to have her grant a second favor. Angered at their perceived ingratitude, the Mother of Faces summons the animal spirits of Forgetful Valley in an attempt to force them to leave. In the chaos, Rafa's mask is knocked off, revealing that Rafa's face was not disfigured but instead taken by Koh the Face Stealer, whom the Mother of Faces reveals to be her son. Repentant, the spirit restores Rafa's face and agrees to help Aang repair the relationship between Ursa and her children.

Having used a shortcut pointed out by Misu, Zuko and Sokka arrive at Noren and Noriko's house before Azula. Zuko goes inside to see the couple, where he divulges his true identity and Ursa's. Noren acknowledges this, revealing himself to be Ikem, but Ursa does not remember Zuko. Ikem explains that the Mother of Faces had learned of Ursa's memories of her life with Ozai, including those concerning Zuko and Azula, and offered to remove them after seeing the pain they caused Ursa. With no way of liberating her children and being unwilling to live without knowing what was happening to them, Ursa agreed to the offer. Azula and Sokka then crash through the roof as they battle, and Azula then focuses her attention on Ursa, and in her psychosis accuses her mother of trying to overpower her since she was born. Noriko/Ursa apologizes, saying she must not have loved Azula enough, bringing the former princess to the edge of tears. Zuko then intervenes and fights off Azula. He states that he has accepted his destiny as Fire Lord, and that although he and Azula may never have a good relationship, she is still his sister. Unable to handle the fact that someone does love her, Azula flees towards Forgetful Valley, despite Zuko's pleas that he wants to help her, leaving the incriminating letter behind.

Aang arrives with Katara shortly after, with the Mother of Faces following close behind. When the Mother of Faces asks Ursa if she wants her memories back, Ursa agrees, and the spirit restores them as well as her original face. Though Katara also fears Azula will return, both Aang and Zuko believe that her act in leaving the letter with Zuko is the beginning of a change for the better in Azula, though Sokka vehemently disagrees. Zuko then meets with his mother, who apologizes to Zuko as well, believing that no loving mother would willingly forget her children. She also tells him that the letter was a lie: Zuko is indeed Ozai's son. Ursa wrote the letter to see if her husband was intercepting her letters to Ikem and to hurt him in response for his cruel behavior. She also explains Ozai's abuse of Zuko; upon hearing Ursa's wish that Zuko wasn't his son, Ozai told her that he would treat him as such, vindictively claiming to be simply fulfilling a mother's wish. The figures from the beginning are revealed to be Zuko and Ursa and he asks her how it all began, to which she agrees, ending the story.

== Development ==
DiMartino and Konietzko initially pitched The Search to Nickelodeon as a 90-minute animated movie. The channel declined, choosing to expand the Avatar: The Last Airbender sequel series The Legend of Korra to a full 26-episode season instead. This allowed the development of The Search as a graphic novel.
