= Zuko =

Fictional character from Avatar: The Last Airbender

- Avatar Legends character
- Zuko as he appears in Book 3 of Avatar: The Last Airbender.
- First appearance: Original series: "The Boy in the Iceberg" (2005); The Legend of Korra: "Rebirth" (2014); Live-action series: "Aang" (2024)
- Last appearance: Original series: "Avatar Aang: The Last Airbender" (2026); The Legend of Korra: "The Coronation" (2014)
- Created by: Michael Dante DiMartino; Bryan Konietzko
- Voiced by: Dante Basco (2005–present); Elijah Runcorn (young; Avatar: The Last Airbender); Bruce Davison (The Legend of Korra); Steven Yeun (Avatar Aang: The Last Airbender); Stephen Fu (Smite); Vincent Tong (video games, 2022–present)
- Portrayed by: Dev Patel (2010 film); Dallas Liu (2024 television series)

In-universe information
- Aliases: The Blue Spirit; Lee; Junior; ZuZu
- Gender: Male
- Title(s): Lord; Fire Lord (formerly); Crown Prince (formerly)
- Occupation: Lord of the Fire Nation; Hunter of the Avatar; Vigilante
- Family: Fire Lord Ozai (father); Ursa (mother); Azula (younger sister); Kiyi (younger maternal half-sister)
- Spouse: Unknown
- Children: Fire Lord Izumi (daughter)
- Relatives: Roku (maternal great-grandfather) Fire Lord Sozin (paternal great-grandfather) Fire Lord Azulon (paternal grandfather); Iroh (paternal uncle); Lu Ten (paternal cousin)
- Nationality: Fire Nation
- Bending element: Firebending, Lightning Redirection
- Age: 16 in Avatar: The Last Airbender; 87–91 in The Legend of Korra

Zuko (Chinese characters: 豎髙, 祖寇, 蘇科, pinyin: Shù Méng, Zǔ Kòu, Sū Kē), commonly known as Prince Zuko, Fire Lord Zuko, and later simply Lord Zuko, is a fictional character in Nickelodeon's animated television series Avatar: The Last Airbender, and is part of the Avatar: The Last Airbender world. He was created by Eric Coleman and designed by series creators Michael Dante DiMartino and Bryan Konietzko, the character is voiced by Dante Basco in Avatar: The Last Airbender, Bruce Davison in The Legend of Korra, and Steven Yeun in Avatar Aang: The Last Airbender, and portrayed by Dev Patel in M. Night Shyamalan's 2010 film and Dallas Liu in the Netflix live-action adaptation series.

Zuko was born the Crown Prince of the Fire Nation in the capital, Hari Bulkan (also known as Caldera City). He is the eldest child of Fire Lord Ozai and Lady Ursa, and the older brother of Princess Azula and his maternal half-sister, Kiyi. Before the events of the series, Zuko is permanently scarred and then banished from the Fire Nation by his tyrannical father. To restore his honor and right to the Fire Nation throne, he is ordered to capture the Avatar, a spiritually powerful individual capable of bending all four elements (Water, Earth, Fire, and Air) and who could end the Hundred Year War started by the Fire Nation's genocide of all airbenders and conquest for world domination. Zuko is accompanied and advised in his search for Avatar Aang by his wise Uncle Iroh.

At the beginning of the series, he is the primary antagonist, opposing Avatar Aang and his allies as he seeks redemption for his father since he has been banished from the Fire Nation. Over time, however, Zuko loses faith in the Fire Nation's war, feels guilt for his crimes, and begins to sympathize with those the Fire Nation has oppressed during the time he has been in the Earth Kingdom, along with his uncle, Iroh. In the later part of the animated series, Zuko redeems himself and eventually joins Aang, helping him learn firebending and fight his father in order to restore peace in the four nations. Zuko also comes to realize that Iroh has been more of a father to him than Ozai; through Iroh's teachings, Zuko truly found his own path. He learned that his honor was never lost and by embracing his true self, he chose to fight for what is right rather than what was expected of him.

In "The Tales of Ba Sing Se", his name was written as "蘇科" (sū kè) on his segment's title card.

== Appearances ==
=== Avatar: The Last Airbender television series ===
==== Book One: Water ====
In the first season, Zuko is introduced as the main antagonist, the exiled son of Fire Lord Ozai who is attempting to capture Avatar Aang in hopes of reclaiming his honor. Throughout the season he pursues the Avatar, at times both helped and hindered by his uncle, Iroh. Zuko competes in his quest against Zhao, an ambitious Fire Nation admiral who is also attempting to capture the Avatar for political gain. When Zhao captures Aang, Zuko disguises himself as "The Blue Spirit" and rescues Aang from Zhao's fortress to prevent him from accomplishing his goal. Later, Zuko escapes an assassination attempt plotted by Zhao. During the invasion of the Northern Water Tribe, Zuko captures Aang, but both nearly die in a snowstorm before they are rescued by Aang's friends, Katara and Sokka. Zuko encounters Zhao and attacks him, but the spirit that temporality fuses with Aang, abducts Zhao before the fight is concluded. Zuko attempts to save him but Zhao was too proud to accept Zuko's help. Zuko survives the ordeal with help from Iroh, who betrayed Zhao and the Fire Nation to protect the ocean and moon spirits. In retaliation for Iroh's betrayal and Zuko's failure to capture the Avatar, Ozai assigns Zuko's younger sister Azula to capture Zuko and Iroh.

==== Book Two: Earth ====
In the second season, Zuko and Iroh travel the Earth Kingdom disguised as impoverished refugees, to start a new life and regain their honor. After briefly quarreling and parting ways with Iroh, Zuko reunites with his uncle against Azula. After Azula wounds Iroh, Zuko nurses Iroh back to health and Iroh teaches Zuko the rare firebending technique of redirecting lightning. Zuko and Iroh travel to the walled city of Ba Sing Se and find employment at a tea shop in the slums. Zuko reluctantly adapts to his new life until he learns of Aang's presence in Ba Sing Se and attempts to steal Aang's pet bison Appa. However, Iroh convinces Zuko to abandon his quest and let Appa go. Azula infiltrates the city to stage a coup and arranges a trap for Zuko and Iroh. Imprisoned together with Aang's friend Katara, Zuko is rescued alongside her by Aang and Iroh, only to be convinced by Azula to betray Iroh, Katara and the Avatar and finally regain his honor. In the resulting fight, Aang is mortally wounded, though later revived by Katara, Iroh is arrested for helping Aang, and Katara escapes from the conquered city with Aang.

==== Book Three: Fire ====
In the third season, Zuko returns to his country a hero thanks to Azula crediting him with killing the Avatar. Zuko suspects that Aang survived and hires an assassin to ensure Aang's death to cover up Azula's lie. He resumes his romantic relationship with his childhood friend Mai, but continues to feel guilty and uncertain of his decisions. After he learns that his mother's grandfather was Avatar Roku, Aang's predecessor, as well as Azula and Ozai's plan to burn the Earth Kingdom to the ground, Zuko decides to turn his back on the Fire Nation and helps Aang overthrow Ozai. He confronts his father about his cruel treatment and the Fire Nation's destructive effect on the world, before leaving to join Aang. Although they initially reject him for everything he has done against them and everyone else, Aang and his companions grow to accept Zuko as a member of the group after he proves his loyalty to them, but he is confronted by Katara for betraying her the last time he saw her and is pointed straight out they both know he struggled with doing the right thing, and is given clear warning he will be killed by her if he tries to do a second time. He trains Aang in firebending, and the two journey together to meet the last dragons, from whom they learn that firebending can be powered by the energy of life, rather than rage. Zuko and Sokka team up to infiltrate a Fire Nation prison, saving Suki (Sokka's girlfriend), Hakoda (Katara and Sokka's father), and another prisoner, Chit Sang. After Zuko is once again pointed by Katara for having the nerve to act like a friend after betraying her and take advantage of letting her guard down around him (and even if Aang's near death and conquest of Ba Sing Se as result of his actions never happened, it was very personal for Katara and was deeply hurt), he helps Katara find the killer of her mother, Zuko is finally accepted by Katara.

When Zuko is finally reunited with Iroh in the series finale, he tearfully apologizes for his mistakes and gets his uncle's forgiveness. Refusing the throne himself, Iroh suggests that Zuko become the next Fire Lord, citing Zuko's "unquestionable honor." Arriving at the Fire Nation capital with Katara, Zuko duels Azula for the throne. When Azula faces defeat, she forces Zuko to place himself in the path of a lightning bolt aimed at Katara, wounding him (this literally makes up for betraying Katara). Katara defeats Azula and heals Zuko. After Aang defeats Ozai and wins the war, Zuko becomes the new Fire Lord, promising world order and harmony with the aid of the Avatar.

=== Avatar: The Last Airbender comic series ===
==== The Promise ====
In The Promise, following his crown ceremony, sixteen-year-old Zuko asks Aang to promise to kill him if he ever becomes like his father. Aang reluctantly agrees. One year later, Zuko is working with the other nations to return captured colonial lands to the Earth Kingdom as part of the Harmony Restoration Movement. Kori Morishita attempts to assassinate Zuko in retaliation for forcibly relocating the multicultural residents of the Fire Nation colonies. Zuko travels to Kori's hometown, and Fire Nation Colony, Yu Dao, where he meets people of Fire Nation and the Earth Kingdom ancestry living and working together. Zuko becomes conflicted and consults with the imprisoned Ozai, who advises Zuko that whatever decision he makes is inherently the correct choice because he exercises the power of the Fire Lord. Zuko decides to break from the Harmony Restoration Movement. The Earth King responds with a military force of his own and Zuko is forced to lead troops to Yu Dao to protect the Fire Nation civilians. In the battle, Aang and Zuko clash. However, Katara convinces the Earth King that the colonies are neither Fire Nation nor the Earth Kingdom, but rather a multicultural people. Peace is restored, and Zuko realizes that forcing Aang to make the promise was a way of distancing himself from his responsibilities as Fire Lord. He releases Aang from the promise, and the two re-establish their friendship and trust.

==== The Search ====
In various flashbacks in The Search, it is revealed that Zuko's mother, Ursa, was previously engaged to a man named Ikem in her hometown of Hira'a, but had to leave him after being pressured into marrying Prince Ozai. Even after Zuko's birth, Ursa continued to write letters to Ikem, but Ozai intercepted the letters. Ursa, suspecting the interception, writes a letter claiming Zuko is Ikem's son rather than Ozai's. Ozai confronts her, and although he believes Zuko is truly his son, he retaliates by claiming to have ordered Ikem to be killed and stating he will treat Zuko as if he were actually Ikem's son.

A later flashback reveals that Ursa was responsible for creating an untraceable poison used by Ozai to kill Fire Lord Azulon in order to protect Zuko from Azulon. Ozai, fearing that Ursa would one day use the same poison against him, banishes Ursa from the palace the same night.

In the present, Azula reveals to Zuko she had access to the letters intercepted by Ozai. She uses her knowledge of their contents as leverage to be allowed to come with Zuko to find Ursa. Zuko and Azula travel with Aang, Katara, and Sokka to Hira'a. On the journey, Zuko tries to be more compassionate towards Azula, who suffers from erratic behavior and hallucinations following her mental breakdown. Zuko discovers the letter from Ursa stating that Zuko is Ikem's son, and begins to doubt if he is the rightful Fire Lord. Azula manipulates these doubts to weaken Zuko's resolve to be Fire Lord.

Zuko and Azula discover that Ursa is alive and married to Ikem, having had her memories erased and appearance changed by a spirit to relieve her of the pain of losing her children. Zuko is satisfied to know that Ursa is happy and is prepared to leave Ursa in peace, but with Ikem's encouragement, reveals to her that he is her forgotten son. Zuko also says that he is Ikem's son, but Ikem says that this is not possible, implying that he and Ursa never had intercourse before her marriage to Ozai. Azula attacks Ursa and Zuko and tries to persuade Zuko to give up the throne. Zuko reaffirms his commitment to his destiny as Fire Lord as well as their relationship as brother and sister. Azula's emotional and mental resolve breaks, and she flees into the forest.

Ursa chooses to have her memories and appearance restored by the spirit. Ursa reveals her past to Zuko, including that the letter claiming he was Ikem's son is false and that he is the rightful Fire Lord.

==== Smoke and Shadow ====
Weeks later, in Smoke and Shadow, Azula secretly manipulates Ozai loyalists into taking actions against Zuko, including an assassination attempt and kidnapping schemes that target Zuko's family and allies. In response, Zuko begins making harsher decisions in an attempt to preserve security and authority. Zuko's decisions are criticized by his allies and citizens as excessive. This leads to protesting and rioting within the Fire Nation capitol. Zuko and his allies eventually discover Azula's plot. Before escaping, Azula says she has accepted Fire Lord Zuko's claim as rightful Fire Lord, and has also accepted her own destiny to shape Zuko into becoming a stronger and more ruthless leader. In a speech, Fire Lord Zuko apologizes to his people and asks for their forgiveness, patience and trust as he tries to become a better leader.

=== The Legend of Korra ===
Zuko in The Legend of Korra.

==== Book One: Air ====
In The Legend of Korra, the multicultural region created in The Promise has developed into the United Republic of Nations. Lord Zuko, now eighty-seven years old, has abdicated the throne in favor of his daughter, Izumi, and travels the world on his dragon Druk as an ambassador for peace. He is commemorated by a statue at Republic City's Central City Station. His grandson Iroh (also voiced by Dante Basco) serves as a general of the United Republics' armed forces.

==== Book Three: Change ====
In Book Three: Change, it is revealed that Zuko worked with the Order of the White Lotus to keep major threats in check in the years before Avatar Korra was able to. Most notably, he worked alongside Chief Sokka, Aang's son Tenzin, and Korra's father Tonraq to thwart an attempt by the criminal Zaheer and his Red Lotus followers to kidnap Korra when she was a child. As a result, both Tenzin and Tonraq had Korra hidden away in a compound for years.

Fourteen years later, Zuko learns that Zaheer has become an airbender due to the harmonic convergence and escaped from prison. He enlists Tonraq and Korra's cousins Desna and Eska to keep Zaheer's partner P'Li from escaping, but fails to prevent P'Li from rejoining Zaheer. After Zaheer assassinates the Earth Queen, Zuko returns to the Fire Nation to protect Izumi. Zuko briefly counsels Korra before he departs and is surprised to learn that the Avatar has spoken to his long-deceased uncle in the Spirit World. After Korra defeats Zaheer, Zuko attends Jinora's airbending mastership ceremony and expresses concerns about the lingering threat of the Red Lotus.

==== Book Four: Balance ====
Zuko makes a final non-speaking appearance in Book Four: Balance, attending the coronation of Prince Wu along with Izumi.

== Creation and conception ==
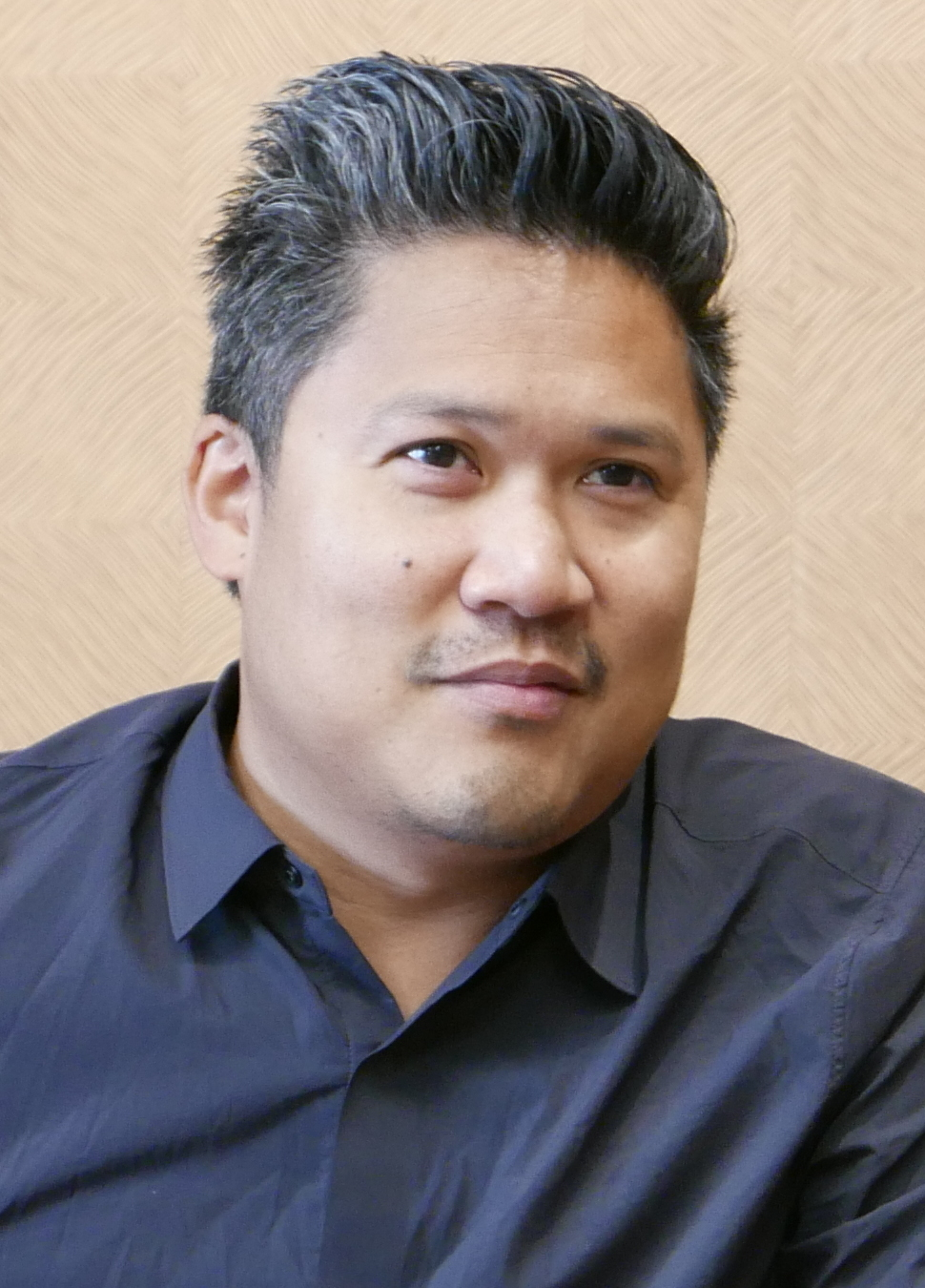
Dante Basco voices Zuko in the original series.

The addition of Zuko (voiced by Dante Basco) to the plot of Avatar: The Last Airbender came from executive producer Eric Coleman; during very early production, when Zuko's father Fire Lord Ozai was planned to be the main villain, Coleman suggested that they needed a character who would follow Team Avatar. Additionally, Zuko was initially to be portrayed as an adult. Coleman, however, suggested that the character be portrayed as a "really driven kid" chasing Aang. It was followed by Bryan Konietzko asking whether he could have a scar, to which Coleman agreed. As a result, Coleman was dubbed "the godfather of Zuko" by Konietzko and Michael Dante DiMartino, the series' creators.

In the Avatar Extras for "The Avatar Returns" it is stated that "Zuko was originally going to be the love interest for Katara", and in "The Ember Island Players" it is stated that "the creators and writers toyed with the idea of Zuko and Katara falling in love". Co-creators Michael Dante DiMartino and Bryan Konietzko deny that they ever considered Zuko and Katara getting together, and claim that Katara becoming a couple with Aang was planned from the start. However, the initial proposal of the series as outlined in the development bible does not have Katara enter a romantic relationship with anyone, directly countering their claims that Katara was always intended to end up with Aang. Multiple writers who worked on the series have also made statements contradicting the co-creators. Writer John O'Bryan said that the topic of Zuko and Katara becoming a couple came up a lot in the writers' room. This is corroborated by writer Joshua Hamilton who says that the crew argued about who Katara should be with, and that there was a plan where Zuko and Katara ended up together. When reflecting on the writing process for The Ember Island Players, writer Tim Hedrick stated that Katara's rejection of Aang's romantic advances and the allusions to a potential relationship between Zuko and Katara in the episode allowed the writers to keep their options open, as Aang and Katara becoming a couple in the series finale was not a foregone conclusion, and Aang could have remained single. This aligns with comments made by M. Night Shyamalan, director of The Last Airbender film, who recalled that during the production of Book Three: Fire, DiMartino and Konietzko were uncertain, "At that time they hadn't even decided where things were going to end, even like who Katara was going to end up with."

Zuko was originally going to switch sides and join Team Avatar at the end of Book Two: Earth, in "The Crossroads of Destiny", but head writer Aaron Ehasz felt that "he wasn't ready" at that point. According to the Avatar Extras of "The Cave of Two Lovers", Zuko was no longer a sheltered prince and was forced to experience life as a refugee, and thus his journey reflected the experiences of the Buddha.

In Book Two: Earth, Mai was established to have a crush on Zuko since childhood, but Zuko did not reciprocate her feelings. However, the two are in a relationship in the season premiere of Book Three: Fire, "The Awakening", as Zuko's characterization was retconned in the "Going Home Again" comic to turn Mai's one-sided feelings into a mutual crush. Director Giancarlo Volpe has stated that he was shocked by this development because co-creators Bryan Konietzko and Michael Dante DiMartino constantly telegraphed their storyline plans to the crew far in advance, but they never mentioned that Zuko and Mai would become a couple or that Zuko even had any romantic interest in Mai in the first place.

The Blue Spirit design was inspired from a Dragon King Nuo mask from Chinese opera. His mask was made blue, because the creators thought that a red mask would give away the Blue Spirit's secret identity to the audience too easily.

== Characterization ==
=== Personality ===
Zuko as the crown prince of the Fire Nation has been saddled with great responsibility from a young age. He is traumatized by his mother's disappearance, and the abuse he experienced from his father Ozai and sister Azula. His uncle Iroh becomes the one stable source of support in his life. Zuko begins the series selfishly obsessed with regaining his honor and is in a near perpetual state of rage but he eventually learns to let go of this anger to become a much calmer, rational, and selfless person. Zuko is a complex character who demonstrates a number of contradictory traits, beliefs, and behaviors. As Fire Nation royalty, he has a superiority complex and considers many people to be inferior to him. Though at the same time he has a great sense of justice and refuses to view people as expendable. Zuko felt that he did not need luck so he could be the master of his own fate; but he also believed that he was "lucky to be born" in contrast to Azula who was "born lucky", and that his bad luck had turned the whole world against him. His journey parallels that of the protagonist Aang, and the two serve as foils for each other.

He is skilled in "Dao duel-wielding," as in the episode "The Blue Spirit" wherein he withstands a large number of adversaries. In "Avatar: The Lost Adventures," it was revealed that he studied under Master Piandao, his uncle's colleague and Sokka's master sword fighting instructor. Zuko has also demonstrated an ability in stealth and unarmed combat, as when able to infiltrate a Fire Nation fortress, the Northern Water Tribe's city, and the Dai Li's base in the Earth Kingdom without detection.

=== Firebending ===
Zuko is highly skilled in Firebending and is one of the most powerful firebenders by the end of the show. Firebending is mostly based on Northern Shaolin, with firebenders utilizing Chinese martial arts techniques of changquan, Shaolin kung fu, Southern Dragon kung fu and xingyiquan. The series' creators consulted a professional martial artist in the design of the show's fighting style. Firebending represents the element of power, and is categorized as the most aggressive of the "four bending arts." Many, including Zuko, believe that being a better firebending comes from more efficiently channeling the strength and rage of the wielder. In reality, true firebending power comes from self-restraint, focus, and breath control as a means of directing and containing the fire manifested. Poor breath control means dangerously poor control of any fire generated. Zuko accepts this only after meeting the last dragons, who were the original firebenders.

== Critical reception ==
Zuko's character development and redemption arc has received acclaim from critics and audiences alike. Tory Ireland Mell of IGN thought it was "painful" to watch Zuko try to win the trust of Team Avatar as he was "completely vulnerable, and no one cared." Mell found his reunion with Iroh to be "heartwarming." Zuko was listed by Zach Blumenfeld from Paste as the best character from the Avatar universe, with Blumenfeld noting his complex transformation and redemption story over the course of the series. John Maher of The Dot and Line stated that Zuko's character development throughout the series is "the best redemption arc in the history of television". Dante Basco received praise for his voice acting and portrayal of the character.

== Family tree ==
Fire Nation Royal Family tree

Fire Lord Yosor
Generations
Keohso Clan	Fire Lord Gonryu	Saowon Clan
Generations	Huazo's; Parents	High Sage (Huazo's Uncle)
Sulan (Note: In The Shadow of Kyoshi (2020), Fire Lord Chaeryu is explained to have married Sulan, while having Huazo as a mistress. Chaeryu has a legitimate son, Zoryu, with Sulan, and an illegitimate son, Chaejin, with Huazo.)	Fire Lord Chaeryu	Huazo	Huazo's Sibling
Fire Lord Zoryu	Chaejin	Koulin
Generations
Fire Lord Taiso r. ?–58 BG	Hazei	Roku's Parents
Fire Lord Sozin r. 58 BG – 20 AG	Princess Zeisan	Yasu	Roku	Ta Min
Fire Lord Azulon r. 20–95 AG	Ilah	Jinzuk	Rina
General Iroh	Fire Lord Ozai r. 95–100 AG	Ursa (Note: In The Search (2013), Zuko's and Azula's mother Ursa is revealed to have eloped with her old boyfriend Ikem, both hiding their identities from Ozai as "Noriko" and "Noren", and together having a daughter: Kiyi.)	Noren
Prince Lu Ten	Fire Lord Zuko r. 100–167 AG	Princess Azula	Kiyi
Fire Lord Izumi r. 167 AG – present
General Iroh II	Izumi's; Daughter (Note: Izumi's daughter is an unseen character, mentioned as existing in the DVD commentary to the Legend of Korra episode "The Coronation".)

Key:
Item	Description
	Fire Lord
BG	Before Genocide (Note: The terms "BG" and "AG" stand for "Before Genocide" and "After Genocide", referring to the genocide of the Air Nomads that occurs 100 years before the start of Avatar: The Last Airbender; this event is marked as year 0.)
AG	After Genocide
