= Kiyoshi =

- Gender: Different genders depending on the kanji used

Origin
- Origin: Japanese
- Meaning: Different meanings depending on the kanji used

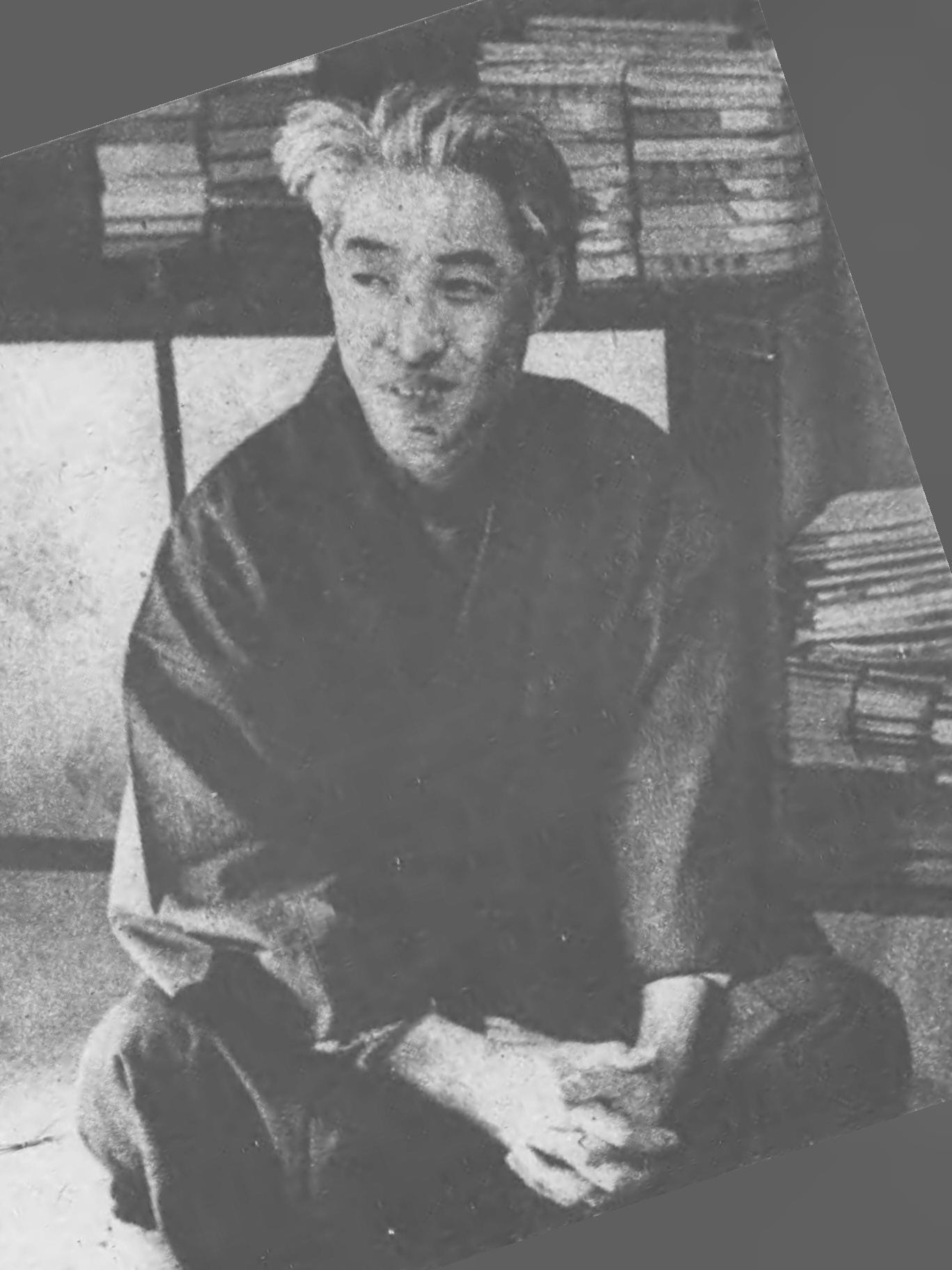
Kiyoshi Watatani (Japanese Novelist)

Kiyoshi, (きよし or キヨシ), is a Japanese given name, also spelled Kyoshi.

== Possible meanings ==
- Kyōshi, a form of Japanese poetry
- Kyōshi, a Japanese honorific

== Written forms ==
- 清, "cleanse"
- 淳, "pure"
- 潔, "undefiled"
- 清志, "cleanse, intention"
- 清司, "cleanse, official"
- 聖, "holy"
- 澄, "lucidity"
- 潔司, "undefiled, official"

== People with the name ==
- Akira Kawabata ("Kiyoshi"), pro wrestler
- Kiyoshi Abe (阿部 巨史; born 1947), Japanese sport wrestler
- Kiyoshi Adachi (安達 清; 1914–????), Japanese pole vaulter
- Kiyoshi Adachi (安達 澄; born 1969), Japanese politician
- Kiyoshi Aki (安藝 清; born 1947), Japanese owner and founder of Aeon Corporation
- Kiyoshi Akita (秋田 清; 1881–1944), Japanese politician and cabinet minister
- Kiyoshi Arai (新井 潔; born 1969), Japanese former professional baseball player
- Kiyoshi Arakaki (新垣 清; born 1954), Japanese karate practitioner, historian and novelist
- Kiyoshi Asai (浅井 浄; born 1940), Japanese sprinter
- Kiyoshi Atsumi (渥美 清; 1928–1996), Japanese film actor
- Kiyoshi Awazu (粟津 潔; 1929–2009), Japanese graphic designer
- Kiyoshi Doi (土井 淳; born 1933), Japanese baseball player
- Kiyoshi Ejima (江島 潔; born 1957), Japanese politician
- Kiyoshi Esashika (江刺家 清; born 1948), Japanese ice hockey player
- Kiyoshi Fujita (藤田 キヨシ; born 1972), Japanese ice hockey player
- Kiyoshi Hasegawa (admiral) (長谷川 清; 1883–1970), Japanese admiral
- Kiyoshi Hasegawa (artist) (長谷川 潔; 1891–1980), Japanese artist
- Kiyoshi Hatanaka (畑中 清詞; born 1967), Japanese retired boxer
- Kiyoshi Hayasaka (早坂 毅代司; born 1954), Japanese cross-country skier
- Kiyoshi Hikawa (氷川 きよし; born 1977), Japanese Enka singer
- Kiyoshi Hiraizumi (平泉 澄; 1895–1984), Japanese historian and Shinto priest
- Kiyoshi Igarashi (五十嵐 清; born 1969), Japanese politician
- Kiyoshi Igusa (born 1949), Japanese-American mathematician
- Kiyoshi Ijichi (伊地知 潔; born 1977), Japanese drummer of Asian Kung-Fu Generation
- Kiyoshi Ikeda (池田 清; 1885–1966), Japanese bureaucrat, police official, and politician
- Kiyoshi Ikenaga (池永 清; born 1966), a Shiatsu Master, Shiatsupractor (SPR),
- Kiyoshi Imazumi (今泉 清; born 1967), Japanese former rugby union player
- Kiyoshi Inoue (井上 清; 1913–2001), Japanese academic, historian and writer
- Kiyoshi Itô (伊藤 清; 1915–2008), Japanese mathematician
- Kiyoshi Jinzai (神西 清; 1903–1957), Japanese novelist, Russian translator and literary critic
- Kiyoshi Kase (加瀬 清; 1903–????), Japanese wrestler
- Kiyoshi Katsuki (香月 清司; 1881–1950), Japanese general soldier
- Kiyoshi Kawakami (河上 清; 1873–1949), Japanese Christian journalist
- Kiyoshi Kawakubo (川久保 潔; 1929–2019), Japanese voice actor
- Kiyoshi Kimura (木村 清; born 1952), Japanese businessman
- Kiyoshi Kitagawa (北川 潔; 1958–2026), Japanese-American jazz double bassist
- Kiyoshi Kiyosawa (清沢 洌; 1890–1945), Japanese journalist and writer
- Kiyoshi Kobayashi (小林 清志; 1933–2022), Japanese actor
- Kiyoshi Kobayashi (professor) (小林 潔司; born 1953), Japanese president of the Japan Society of Civil Engineers
- Kiyoshi Kodama (児玉 清; 1934–2011), Japanese TV personality and actor
- Kiyoshi Koishi (小石 清; 1908–1957), Japanese photographer
- Kiyoshi Kuromiya (1943–2000), Japanese American author and advocate
- Kiyoshi Kurosawa (黒沢 清; born 1955), Japanese film director
- Kiyoshi Maekawa (前川 清; born 1948), Japanese singer and tarento
- Kiyoshi Maita (真板 潔; born 1959), Japanese golfer
- Kiyoshi Miki (三木 清; 1897–1945), Japanese philosopher
- Kiyoshi Misaki (見崎 清志; born 1946), Japanese former racing driver
- Kyoshi Miura (三浦 恭資; born 1961), Japanese cyclist
- Kiyoshi Miyazato (宮里 聖志; born 1977), Japanese professional golfer
- Kiyoshi Mizuuchi (水内 潔), Japanese biochemist
- Kiyoshi Murota (室田 淳; born 1955), Japanese professional golfer
- Kiyoshi Mutō (武藤 清; 1903–1989), Japanese architect and structural engineer
- Kiyoshi K. Muranaga (村永 清; 1922–1944), United States Army soldier
- Kiyoshi Myōbudani (明歩谷 清; 1937–2024), Japanese sumo wrestler
- Kiyoshi Nagai (長井 潔; 1949–2019), Japanese structural biologist
- Kiyoshi Nakahata (中畑 清; born 1954), Japanese former Nippon Professional Baseball player
- Kiyoshi Nakakura (中倉 清; 1910–2000), Japanese kendoka, iaidoka and aikidoka
- Kiyoshi Nakamura (runner) (中村 清; 1913–1985), Japanese middle-distance runner
- Kiyoshi Nakamura (footballer) (中村 聖; born 1971), Japanese former football player
- Kiyoshi Nakano (中野 清; born 1936), Japanese politician
- Kiyoshi Nakarai (半井 清; 1888–1982), Japanese bureaucrat, colonial official, and politician
- Kiyoshi Nishikawa (西川 きよし; born 1946), Japanese comedian, actor and former politician
- Kiyoshi Nishimura (西村 潔; 1932–1993), Japanese film director and screenwriter
- Kiyoshi Nishiyama (西山 清; 1893–1983), Japanese photographer
- Kiyoshi Nishiyama (handballer) (西山 清; born 1959), Japanese handball player
- Kiyoshi Niwa (丹羽 清; born 1947), Japanese track and field athlete
- Kiyoshi Nobutoki (信時 潔; 1887–1965), Japanese composer
- Kiyoshi Noda (野田 清; born 1946), Japanese handball player
- Kiyoshi Noguchi (野口 清; 1877–1930), Japanese martial artist
- Kiyoshi Odawara (小田原 潔; born 1964), Japanese politician
- Kiyoshi Ogawa (小川 清; 1922–1945), Japanese navy pilot
- Kiyoshi Oka (岡 潔; 1901–1978), Japanese mathematician
- Kiyoshi Ōkubo (大久保 清; 1935–1976), Japanese murderer
- Kiyoshi Okuma (大熊 清; born 1964), Japanese former football player
- Kiyoshi Oshikawa (押川 清; 1881–1944), Japanese baseball player
- Kiyoshi Saitō (artist) (斎藤 清; 1907–1997), Japanese sōsaku-hanga artist
- Kiyoshi Saito (table tennis) (斎藤 清; born 1962), Japanese former international table tennis player
- Kiyoshi Sakai (酒井 澄), Japanese anime producer and animator
- Kiyoshi Sasabe (佐々部 清; born 1958), Japanese film director
- Kiyoshi Sekiguchi (関口 潔; born 1969), Japanese professional football manager
- Kiyoshi Shiga (志賀 潔; 1871–1957), Japanese physician and bacteriologist
- Kiyoshi Shigematsu (重松 清; born 1963), Japanese writer
- Kiyoshi Sonobe (薗部 澄; 1921–1996), Japanese photographer
- Kiyoshi Sumiya (角谷 清; born 1925), Japanese diplomat
- Kiyoshi Suzuki (鈴木 清; 1943–2000), Japanese photographer
- Kyoshi Takahama (高浜 虚子; 1874–1959), Japanese poet
- Kiyoshi Takayama (髙山 清司; born 1946), Japanese Yakuza
- Kiyoshi Tamura (田村 潔司; born 1969), Japanese professional wrestler
- Kiyoshi Tanabe (田辺 清; born 1940), Japanese boxer
- Kiyoshi Tanabe (tennis) (田辺 清; born 1950), Japanese former professional tennis player
- Kiyoshi Tanimoto (谷本 清; 1909–1986), Japanese Methodist minister
- Kiyoshi Tomizawa (富沢 清司; born 1943), Japanese footballer
- Kiyoshi Toyoda (豊田 清; born 1971), Japanese baseball player
- Kiyoshi Uchiyama (内山 清), Japanese consul
- Kiyoshi Ueda (上田 清司; born 1948), Japanese politician
- Kiyoshi Uehara (植原 清; born 1948), Japanese fencer
- Kiyoshi Uematsu (キヨシ ウエマツ; born 1978), Japanese judōka
- Kiyoshi Umegaki (梅垣 清; born 2007), Japanese racing driver
- Kiyoshi Yabuuchi (薮内 清; 1906–2000), Japanese astronomer and historian of science
- Kiyoshi Yamashita (山下 清; 1922–1971), Japanese artist
- Kiyoshi Yoshida (吉田 潔; born 1964), Japanese composer
- Kiyoshi Yoshimoti (吉用 清; 1948–2020), Japanese kobudōka

== Fictional characters ==
- Kiyoshi, from Hanazuki: Full of Treasures
- Kiyoshi Minamoto (皆本 清), from Battle Royale II: Requiem
- Kiyoshi Tani, from the novel We Are Not Free by Traci Chee
- Roy Kiyoshi, from the Indonesian program television show in Menembus Mata Bathin and Karma
- Avatar Kyoshi, a minor character from Avatar: The Last Airbender and The Legend of Korra, in which she is deceased but eventually became the heroine in her own book series
- Kiyoshi Teppei, from Kuroko's Basketball

== Literature ==
- The Legend of Kyoshi, a fantasy novel duology set in the Avatar franchise
  - The Rise of Kyoshi, the first book in the series, published on July 16, 2019
  - The Shadow of Kyoshi, the second book in the series, published on July 21, 2020

== See also ==
- Kyoshi (disambiguation)
- 清 (disambiguation)
