= Kyoshi =

Kyoshi may refer to:

== People ==
- Kyoshi Miura (三浦 恭資; born 1961), Japanese former cyclist
- Kyoshi Takahama (高浜 虚子; 1874–1959), Japanese poet

== Places ==
- Kyōshi Station, is a passenger railway station

== Other uses ==
- Kyoshi (教師, "sutra master") is a type of Buddhist clergy in Japanese Buddhism
- Avatar Kyoshi, a fictional supporting character from Avatar: The Last Airbender and The Legend of Korra. She has two novels centering on her journey as the Avatar, The Rise of Kyoshi and The Shadow of Kyoshi
- Kōkō Kyōshi, Japanese TV series
- Kyōshi, a form of Japanese poetry
- Kyōshi, a Japanese honorific

== See also ==
- Kiyoshi (disambiguation)
