= Gin'yō Ika-shū =

Gin'yō Ika-shū (銀葉夷歌集) is a Japanese kyōka anthology in five volumes.

== Compiler and date ==
Gin'yō Ika-shū, an anthology of kyōka poetry, was compiled by Seihakudō Gyōfū (生白 堂行風) and first printed in the second month of Enpō 7 (1679) by Iseya San'uemon (伊勢屋山右衛門) in Osaka.

== Title ==
Gin'yō Ika-shū was Gyōfū's third collection, following Kokin Ikyoku-shū and Gosen Ikyoku-shū. The names of these earlier two works are derived from the first two imperial anthologies of waka poetry, the Kokin Waka-shū and Gosen Waka-shū, and so it appears Gyōfū intended to follow this pattern in calling this work the Kin'yō Ikyoku-shū (金葉夷曲集) after the Kin'yō Waka-shū, but for whatever reason he changed his mind, with both the preface (序題) and title page (内題) showing signs of having been amended to the present title.

== Contents ==
The collection contains roughly 1,000 kyōka, in ten volumes. The volumes' topics are, respectively, "Spring", "Summer", "Autumn", "Winter", "Felicitations (and Shinto)", "Partings (and Travel)", "Love", "Miscellaneous I (Names of Things and Acrostic Poetry)", "Miscellaneous II", and "Buddhism".
