= Cheong =

Cheong may refer to:

- Cheong (food), various sweetened food in the form of syrups, marmalades, and fruit preserves
- Cheongsanseong, a mountain fortress in South Korea

== Surnames ==
- Chung (Korean name), a Korean surname
- Jeong (surname), Korean surname written 정
- Zhang (surname), Chinese surname written 張, 张, and 章
- Zhong (surname), Chinese surname written 鍾, 钟, and 仲
- Chang (surname), Chinese surname written 常
- Jiang (surname), Chinese surname written 蔣 and 蒋

== See also ==
- 清 (disambiguation)
