= Sharaku =

Japanese ukiyo-e artist

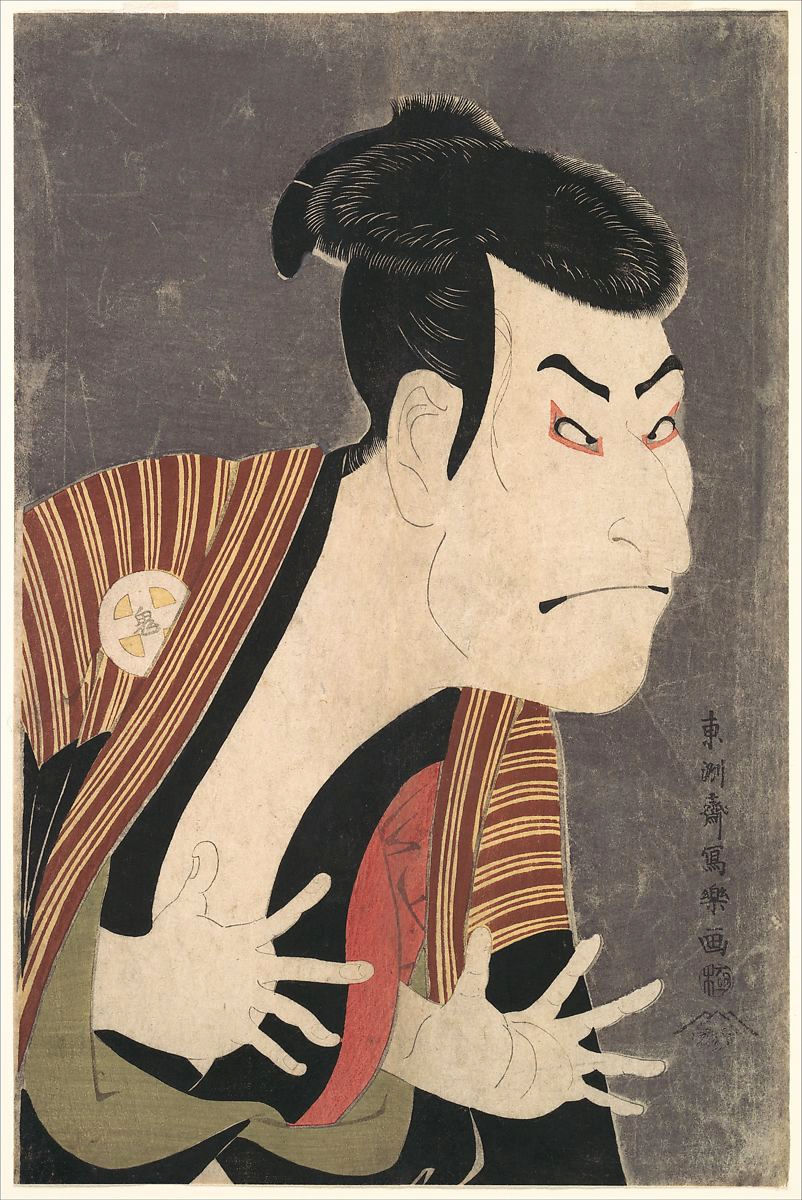
Ōtani Oniji III in the Role of the Servant Edobei, nishiki-e colour print, 1794

Tōshūsai Sharaku (東洲斎 写楽; Japanese pronunciation: [toː.ɕɯꜜː.sai | ɕaꜜ.ɾa.kɯ], fl. 1794–1795) was a Japanese ukiyo-e print designer, known for his portraits of kabuki actors. Neither his true name nor the dates of his birth or death are known. His active career as a woodblock artist spanned ten months; his prolific work met disapproval and his output came to an end as suddenly and mysteriously as it had begun. His work has come to be considered some of the greatest in the ukiyo-e genre.

Sharaku made mostly yakusha-e portraits of kabuki actors. His compositions emphasize poses of dynamism and energy, and display a realism unusual for prints of the time—contemporaries such as Utamaro represented their subjects with an idealized beauty, while Sharaku did not shy from showing unflattering details. This was not to the tastes of the public, and the enigmatic artist's production ceased in the first month of 1795. His mastery of the medium with no apparent apprenticeship has drawn much speculation, and researchers have long tried to discover his true identity—amongst the dozens of proposals, some suggest he was an obscure poet, others a Noh actor, or even the ukiyo-e master Hokusai.

== Background ==
Ukiyo-e art flourished in Japan during the Edo period from the 17th to 19th centuries. The artform took as its primary subjects courtesans, kabuki actors, and others associated with the ukiyo "floating world" lifestyle of the pleasure districts. Alongside paintings, mass-produced woodblock prints were a major form of the genre. Ukiyo-e art was aimed at the merchants at the bottom of the social scale, especially of the administrative capital of Edo (modern Tokyo). Its audience, themes, aesthetics, and mass-produced nature kept it from consideration as serious art.

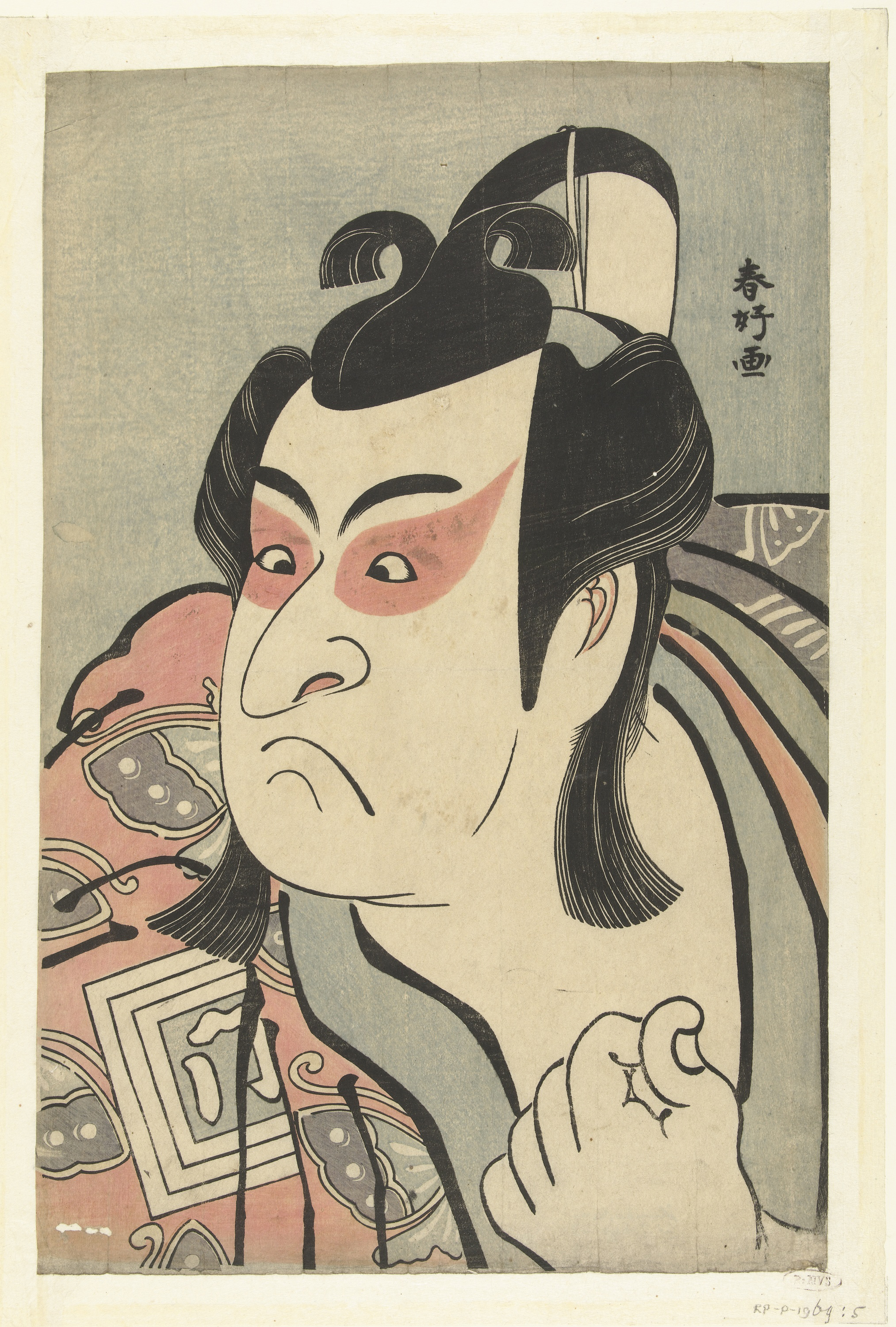
Ichikawa Monnosuke II as Soga no Gorō (1789) by Shunkō, a pioneer in ōkubi yakusha-e head portraits of actors

After the mid-18th century, full-colour nishiki-e prints became common, printed with a large number of woodblocks, one for each colour. Critics have come to see the late 18th century as a peak period in the general quality of the work. Shunshō of the Katsukawa school introduced the ōkubi-e "large-headed picture" in the 1760s. He and other members of the Katsukawa school popularized ōkubi yakusha-e actor prints and the dusting of mica in the backgrounds to produce a luxurious glittering effect. In contrast to earlier actor prints, which used stereotyped features and poses of anonymous actors, these ōkubi yakusha-e aimed for recognizable likenesses.

Tōshūsai (Note: Tōshūsai may have been pronounced Tōjūsai in the artist's time.) Sharaku's works appeared in the middle of the Kansei era (1789–1801), when the nation faced hard economic times that the military government responded to with reactionary policies such as the Kansei Reforms intended to strengthen the feudalistic shogunal system. Some of the policies restricted extravagant fashions, and Kabuki theatres faced strict control over their perceived excesses and limits on actors' incomes. Late Edo-period art nevertheless flourished, and new works and popular actors continued to rapidly appear in kabuki theatre, where realistic performances came in vogue. Yakusha-e came to favour a greater emphasis on the individuality of the actors, and buyers came to expect pictures with the actors' likenesses, (Note: 似顔絵 nigao-e, "facial likeness picture[s]") rather than the stereotyped images of the past, such as those by the once-dominant Torii school.

During his ten-month career Sharaku produced 144 known portraits of kabuki actors, an average of one every two days; by comparison, Utamaro, one of the most celebrated ukiyo-e artists of the period, is said to have taken roughly a decade to produce around 140 works. Explanations for the mysterious brevity of Sharaku's career have often drawn on a statement by the artist and writer Ōta Nanpo, according to whom Sharaku's excessive realism was regarded as strange by his contemporaries.

== Works ==
Over 140 prints have been established as the work of Sharaku; the majority are portraits of actors or scenes from kabuki theatre, and most of the rest are of sumo wrestlers or warriors. The prints appeared in the common print sizes aiban, hosoban, and ōban. (Note: The approximate dimensions of these sizes are: aiban — 23 by 33 centimetres (9.1 in × 13.0 in); hosoban — 15 by 33 centimetres (5.9 in × 13.0 in); ōban — 25 by 36 centimetres (9.8 in × 14.2 in)) They are divided into four periods. The prints of the first two periods are signed "Tōshūsai Sharaku", the latter two only "Sharaku". The print sizes became progressively smaller and the focus shifts from busts to full-length portraits. The depictions become less expressive and more conventional. Two picture calendars dating to as early as 1789 and three decorated fans as late as 1803 have been attributed to Sharaku, but have yet to be accepted as authentic works of his. Sharaku's reputation rests largely on the earlier prints; those from the eleventh month of 1794 and after are considered artistically inferior.

=== First period ===
28 ōban prints make up the first period from the fifth month (Note: The 5th month of the 6th year of Kansei fell from 29 May to 26 June 1794.) of Kansei 6 (in 1794). They depict actors from kabuki plays performed at three theatres: Hana-ayame Bunroku Soga at the Miyako-za; Katakiuchi Noriyaibanashi and the jōruri Hana-shōbu Omoi no Kanzashi at the Kiri-za; and the kiri-kyōgen Yoshitsune Senbon Zakura at the Kawarazaki-za. These prints are ōkubi yakusha-e against black mica backgrounds, made with a precise, fine line and simple colour scheme. There are printing variants of these early prints, suggesting they went through multiple printings and thus sold relatively well.

First-period kabuki portraits

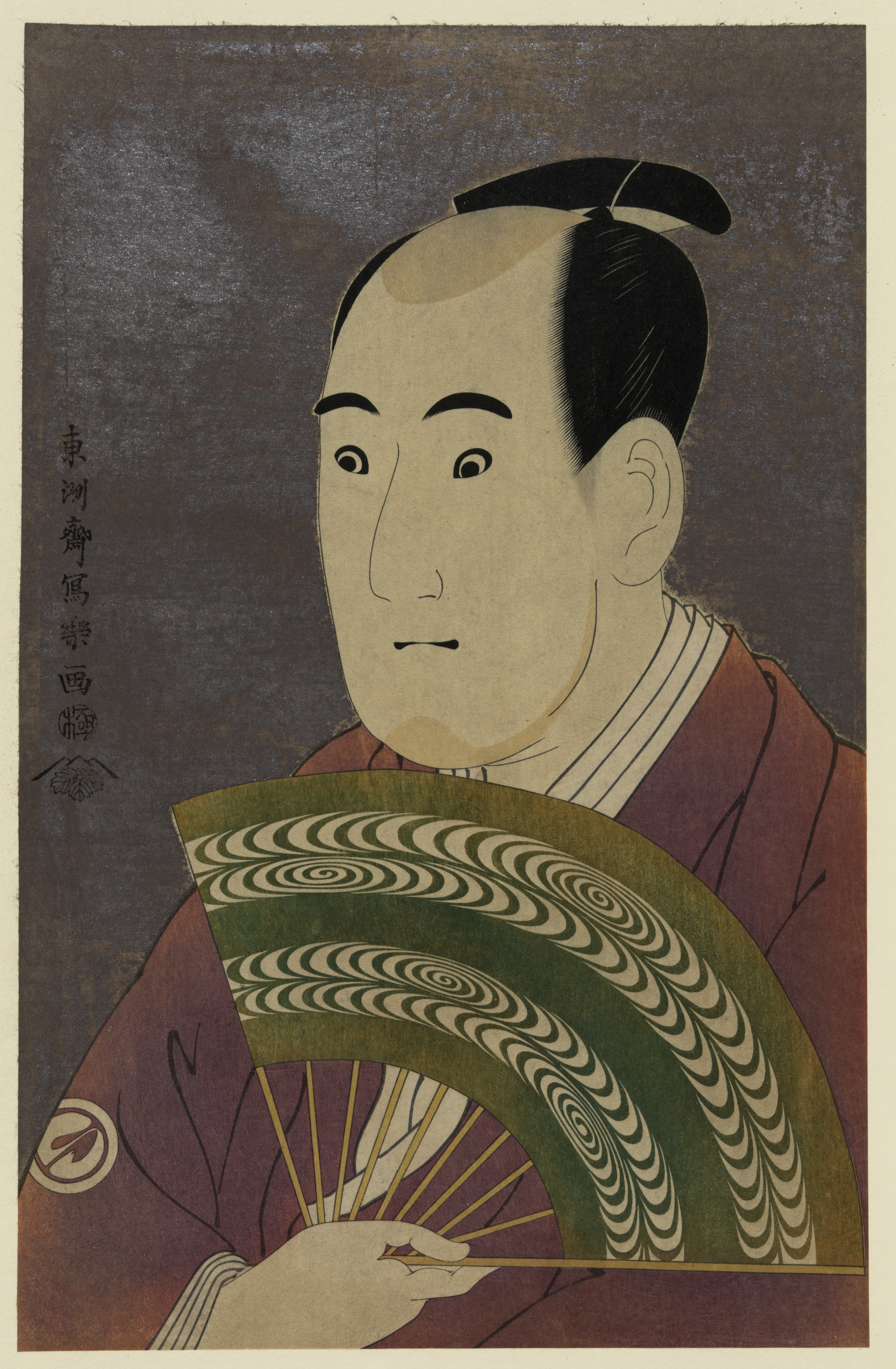
Sawamura Sōjurō III as Ogishi Kurando

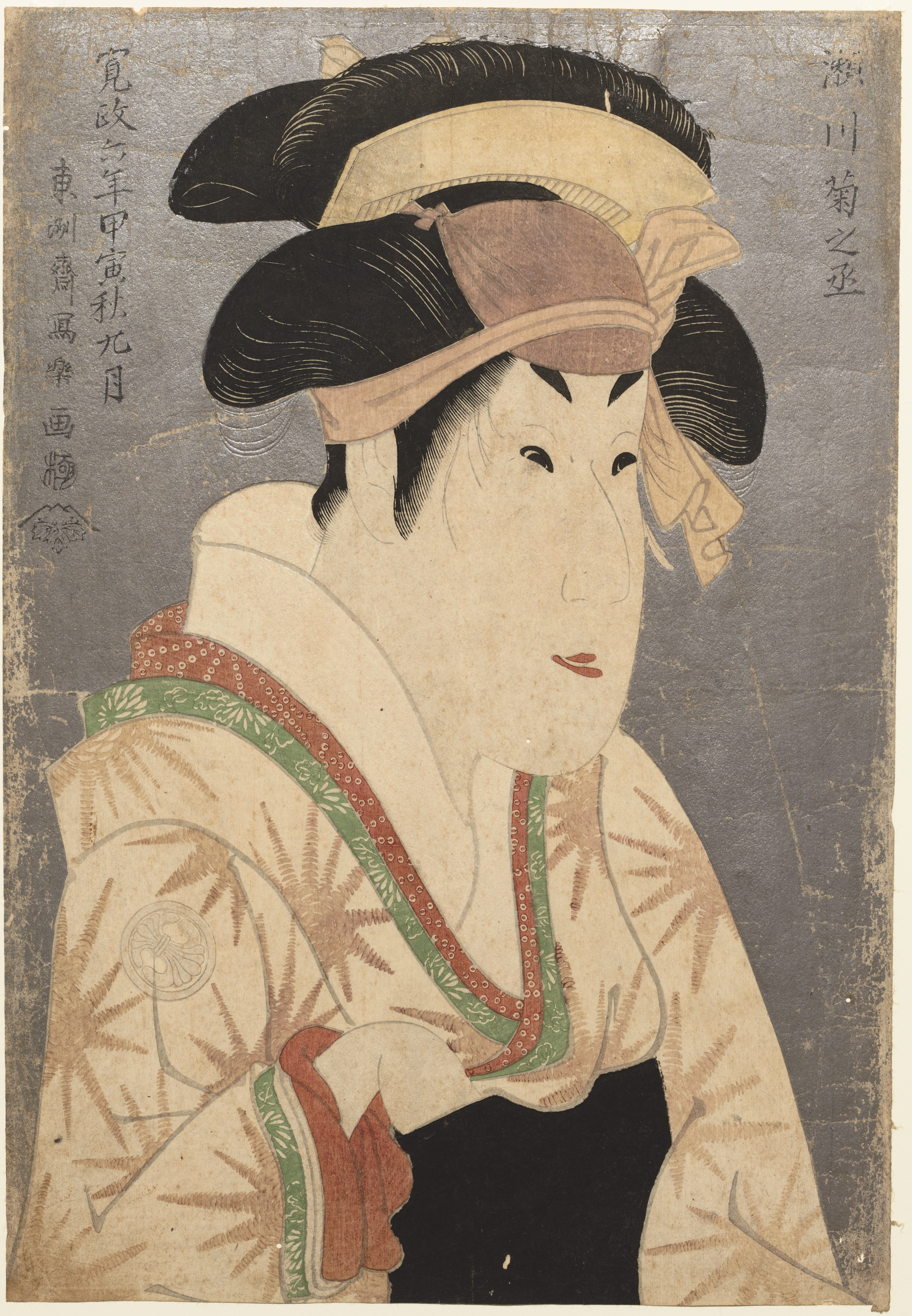
Segawa Kikujurō III as Oshizu, Wife of Tanabe

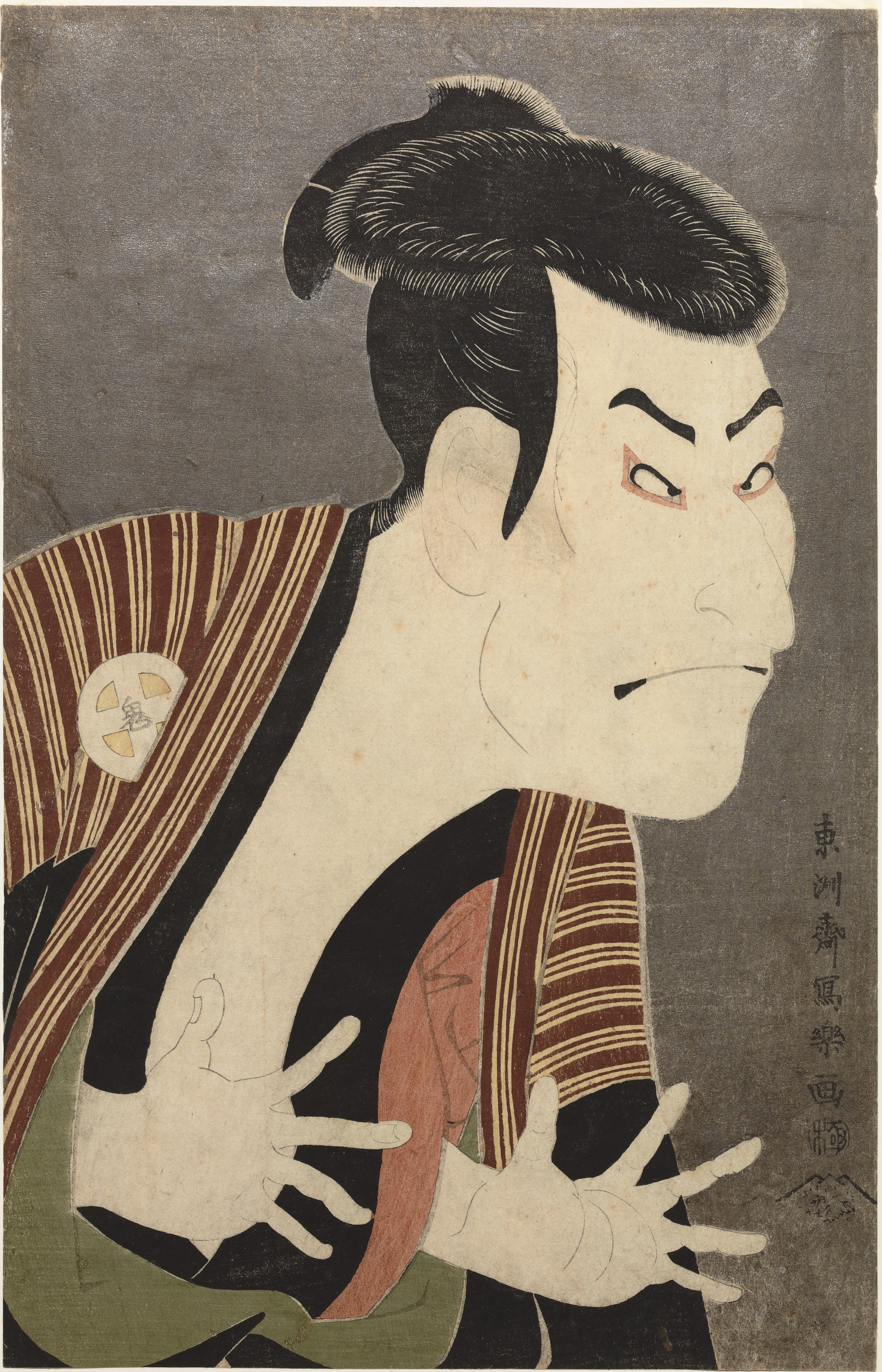
Ōtani Oniji III as Yakko Edobei

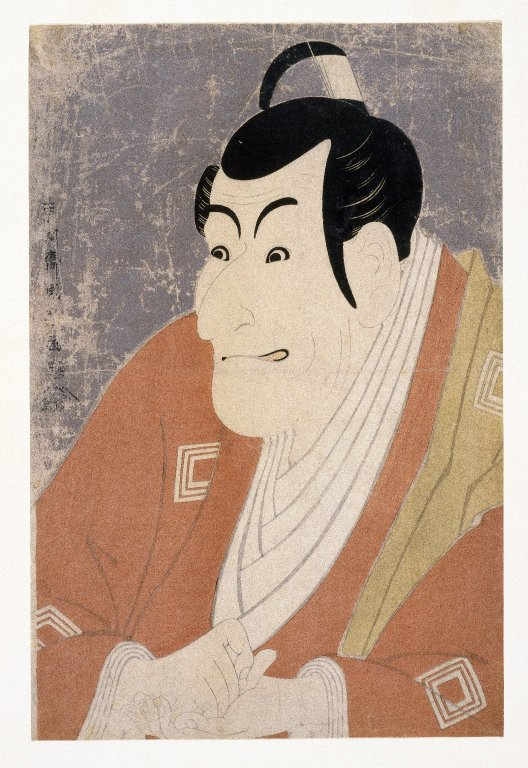
Ichikawa Ebizo IV as Takemura Sadanoshin

=== Second period ===
8 ōban and 30 hosoban prints make up the second period from the seventh (Note: The 7th month of the 6th year of Kansei fell from 27 July to 25 August 1794.) and eighth (Note: The 8th month of the 6th year of Kansei fell from 26 August to 23 September 1794.) months of Kansei 6 (1794). 16 prints are from the jidai-kyōgen Keisei Sanbon Karasaka at Miyako-za in the seventh month; 10 from Nihon Matsu Michinoku Sodachi and the jōruri Katsuragawa Tsuki no Omoide at the Kawarazaki-za in the seventh month; 11 from the jidai-kyōgen Shinrei Yaguchi no Watashi, Yomo no Nishiki Kokyō no Tabiji, and the jōruri Tsuki no Mayu Koi no Monaka at the Kiri-za in the eighth month; and one portrait of Shinozuka Uraeimon as the announcer at Miyako-za.

Of the 8 ōban prints, 7 are full-length portraits of pairs of actors; the other is of the announcer at Miyako-za—the only full-body yakusha-e of a single subject in Sharaku's œuvre. The only one of these ōban prints to employ black mica is that of Ichikawa Komazō III as Kameya Chūbei and Nakayama Tomisaburō as Umegawa from Tsuki no Mayu Koi no Monaka. The hosoban prints are all full-body portraits of a single actor against a yellowish background, with the exception of the portraits of Ōtani Oniji II as Kawashima Jibugorō and Ichikawa Omezō I as Tomita Hyōtarō, which are on grey backgrounds.

Second-period prints

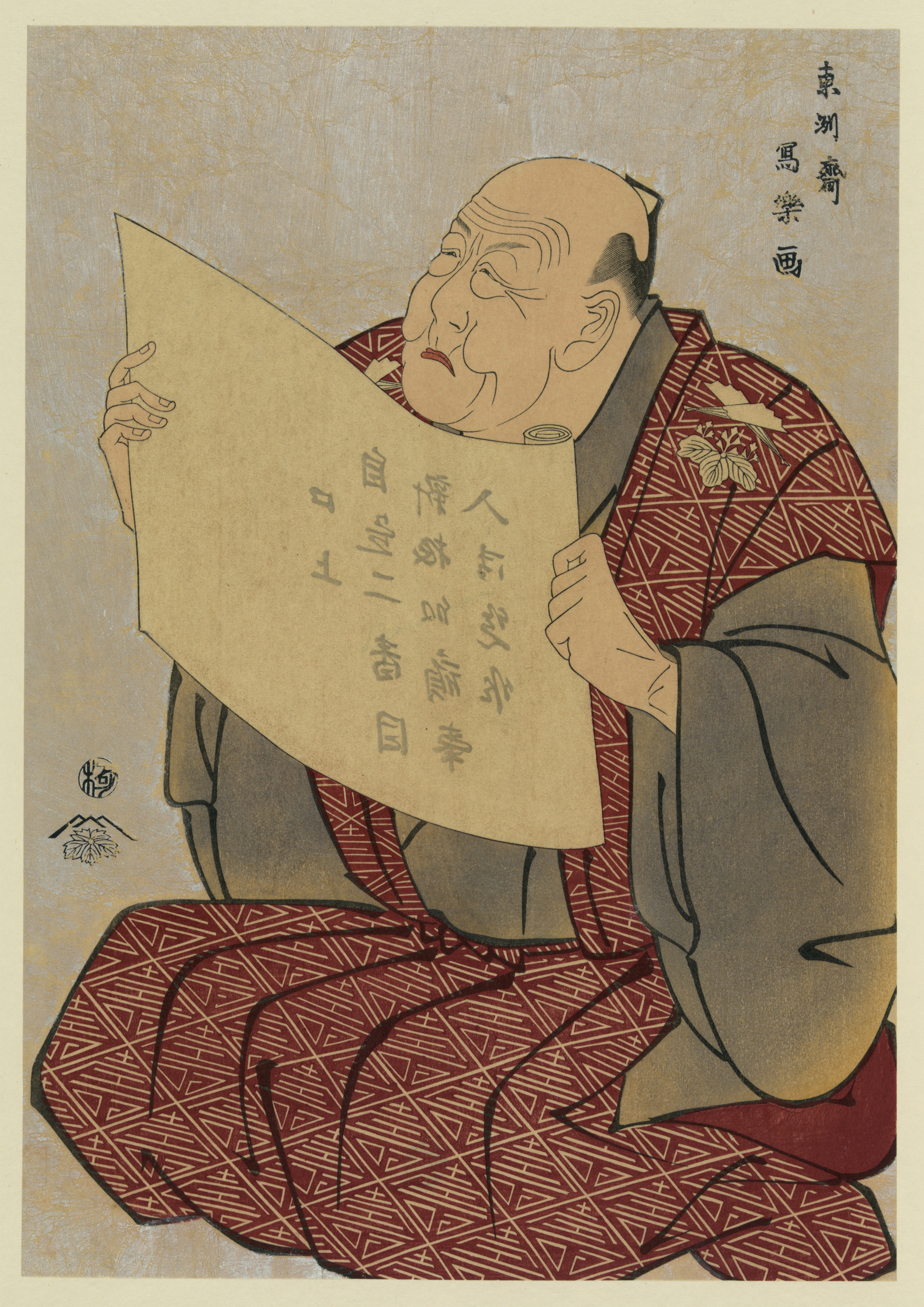
Shinozuka Uraeimon as the announcer at Miyako-za

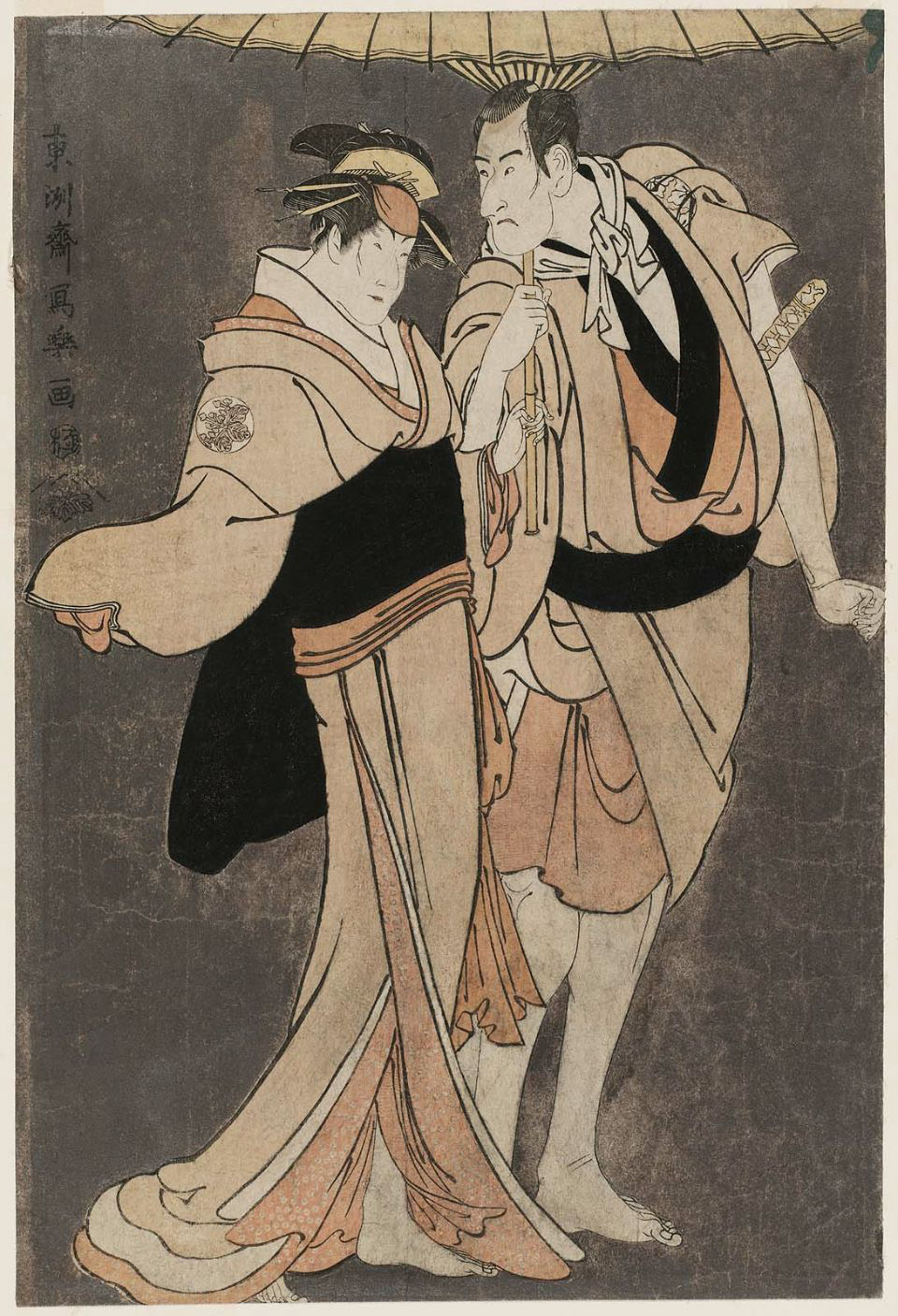
Ichikawa Komazō III as Kameya Chūbei and Nakayama Tomisaburō as Umegawa

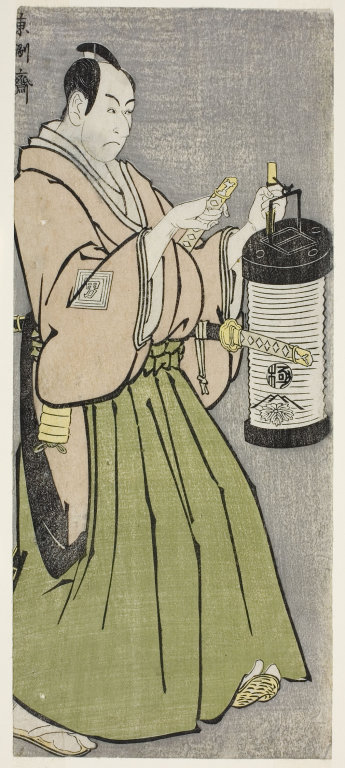
Ichikawa Omezō I as Tomita Hyōtarō

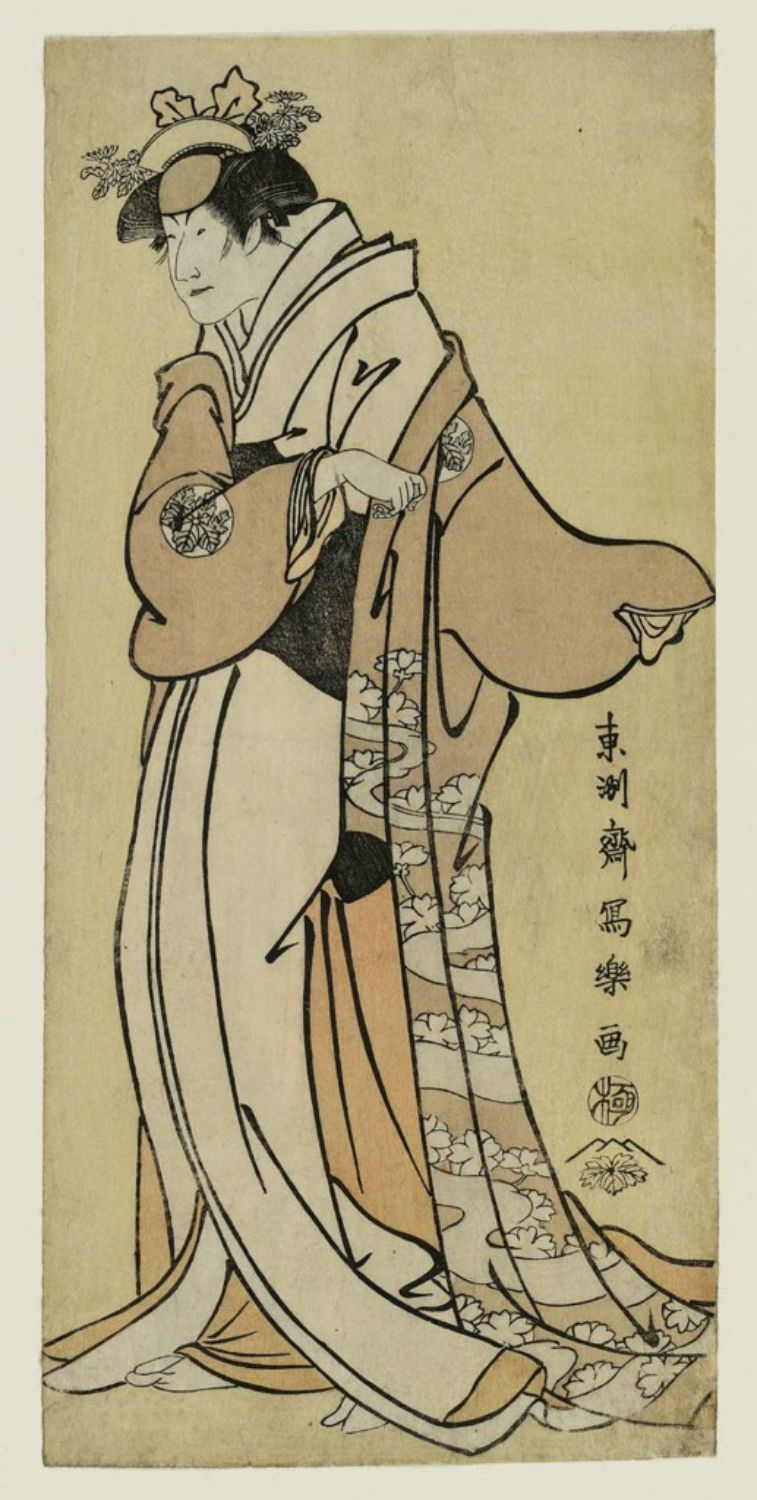
Nakayama Tomisaburō as Tsukuba Gozen

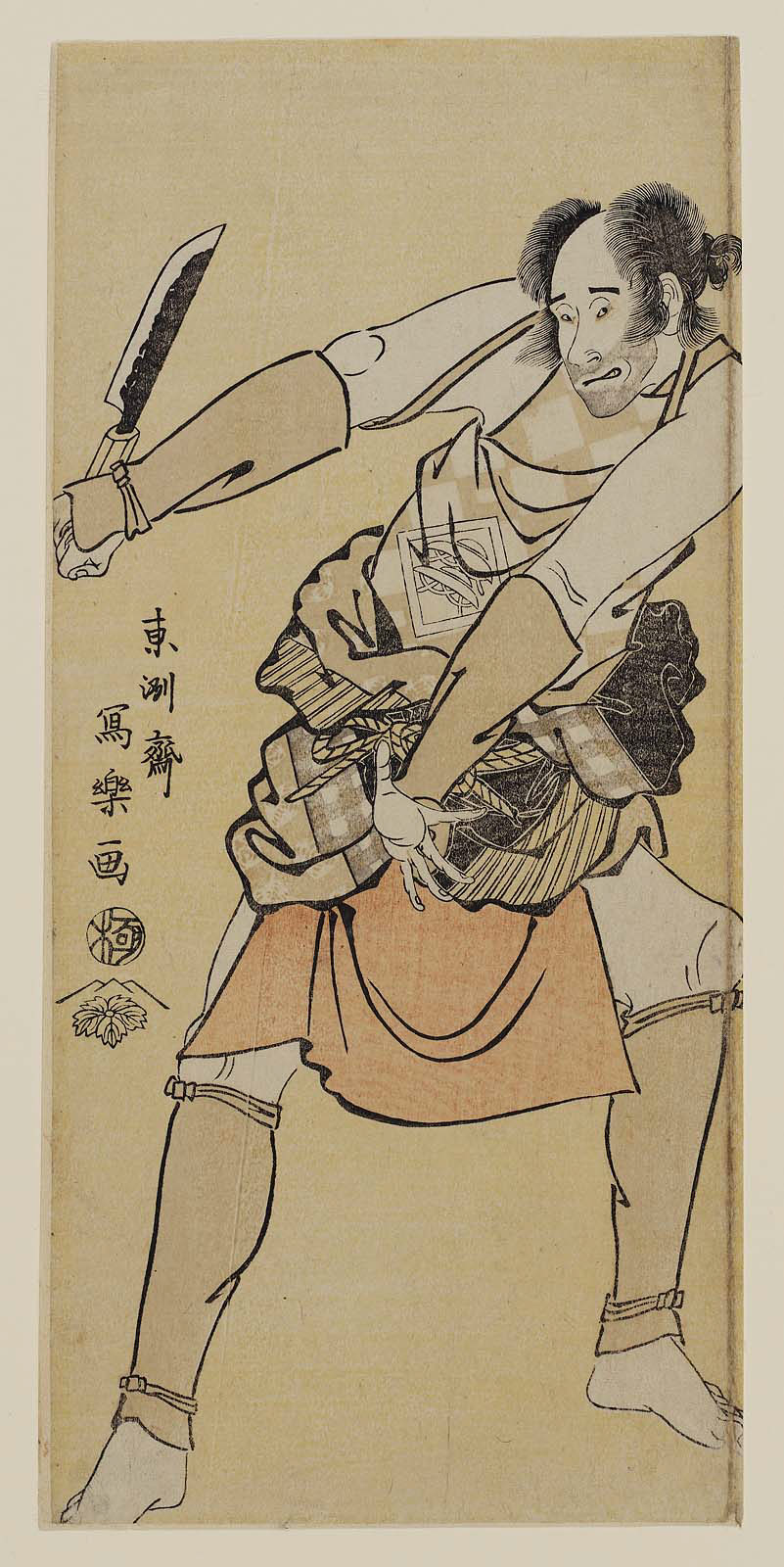
Nakajima Kanzō as Negoto no Chōzō

=== Third period ===
47 hosoban, 13 aiban, and 4 ōban prints make up the third period (1794–1795). From the eleventh (Note: The 11th month of the 6th year of Kansei fell from 23 November to 22 December 1794.) month of Kansei 6, 18 of the prints come from Oshukubai Koi no Hatsune at the Miyako-za; 21 from Otokoyama Oedo no Ishizue and the jōruri Shinobu Koi Suzume no Irodoki at the Kiri-za; 15 from Matsuhamisa Onna Kusunoki and the jōruri Kagurazuki Iwai no Iroginu at the Kawarazaki-za; 4 are of sumo wrestlers, one of which is a triptych; and two are a memorial to Ichikawa Monnosuke II. From the intercalary 11th (Note: The intercalary 11th month of the 6th year of Kansei fell from 23 December 1794 to 20 January 1795.) month, 3 prints are from Hana no Miyako Kuruwa no Nawabari at the Miyako-za. By this period the artistry in Sharaku's work has noticeably deteriorated and displays less of Sharaku's individual touch.

Most of the hosoban prints distinguish themselves in Sharaku's œuvre by having backgrounds of trees or other stage scenery, though a few have empty yellowish ones. Sharaku focuses on transitional poses as before, but the busier designs weaken the effect by drawing attention away from the actors' expressions to other elements of the composition. Most of the aiban prints are more typically Sharaku in that they focus on the upper body and facial expressions against an empty background, this time yellowish.

Third-period prints

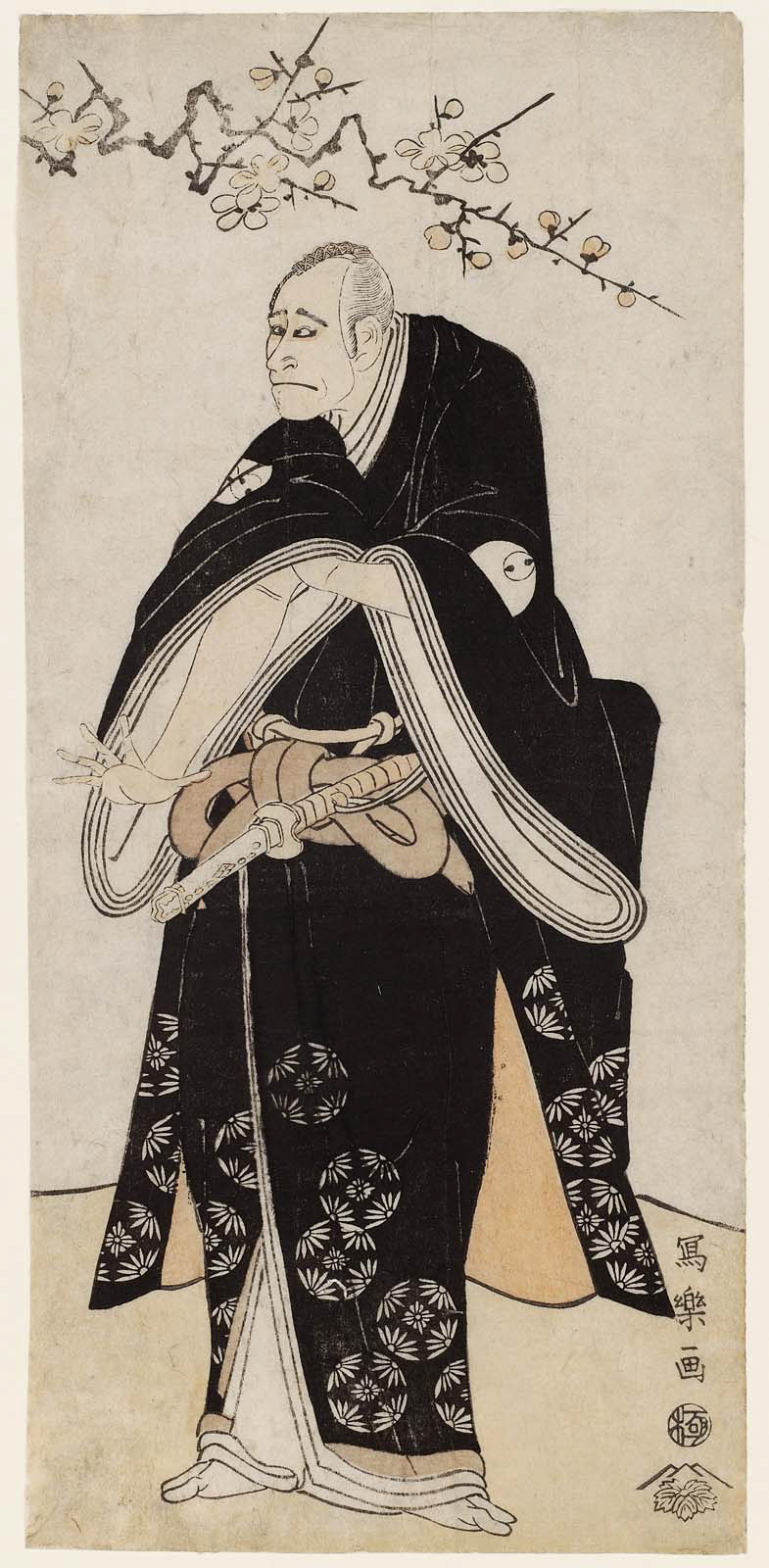
Arashi Ryūzō II as Ōtomo Yamanushi

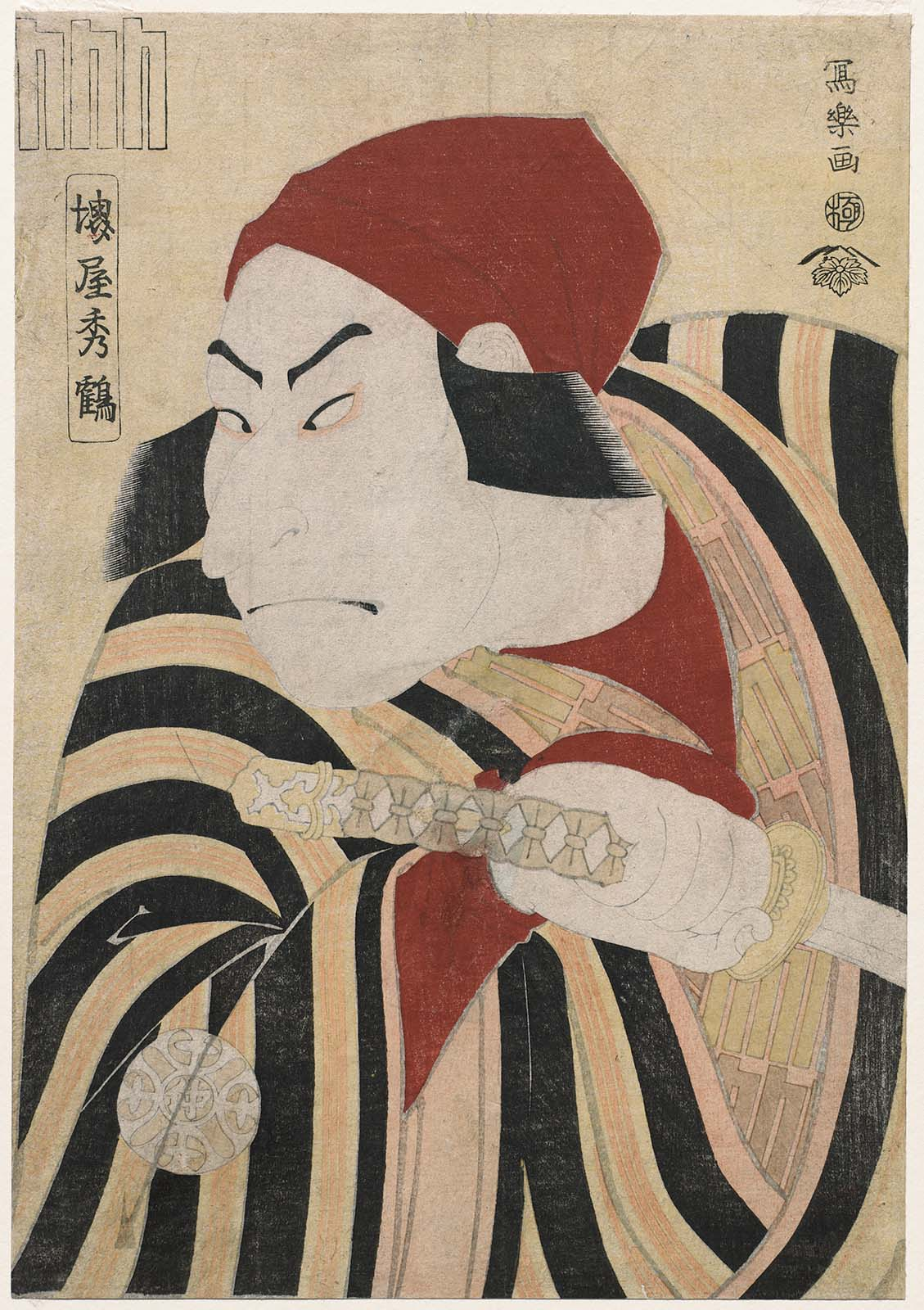
Nakamura Nakazō II as the farmer Tsuchizō, actually Prince Koretaka

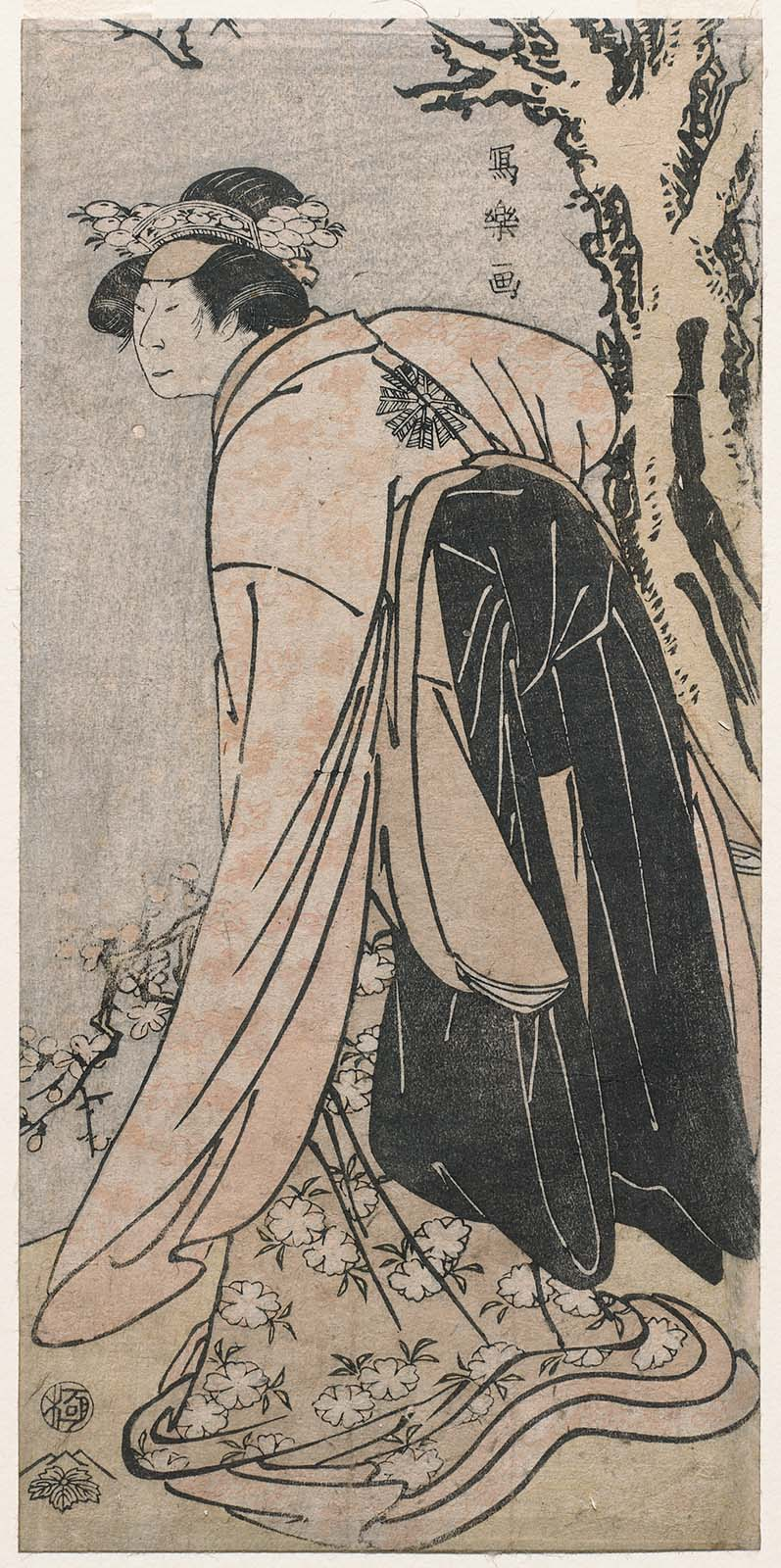
Nakamura Noshio II as Konohana, Daughter of Ki no Tsurayuki

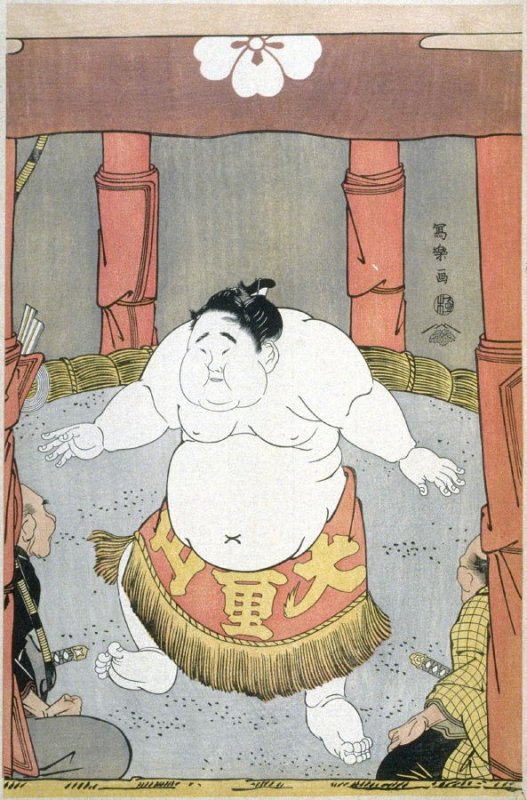
Daidōzan Bungorō enters the sumo ring

=== Fourth period ===
10 hosoban and 5 aiban prints make up the fourth period from the first (Note: The 1st month of the 7th year of Kansei fell from 19 February to 20 March 1795.) month of Kansei 7 (1795). 3 prints come from Nido no Kake Katsuiro Soga at the Kiri-za; 7 from Edo Sunago Kichirei Soga and Godairiki Koi no Fūjime at the Miyako-za; 1 is a sumo print; 2 are musha-e warrior prints; and 1 is of the god of luck Ebisu.

Fourth-period prints

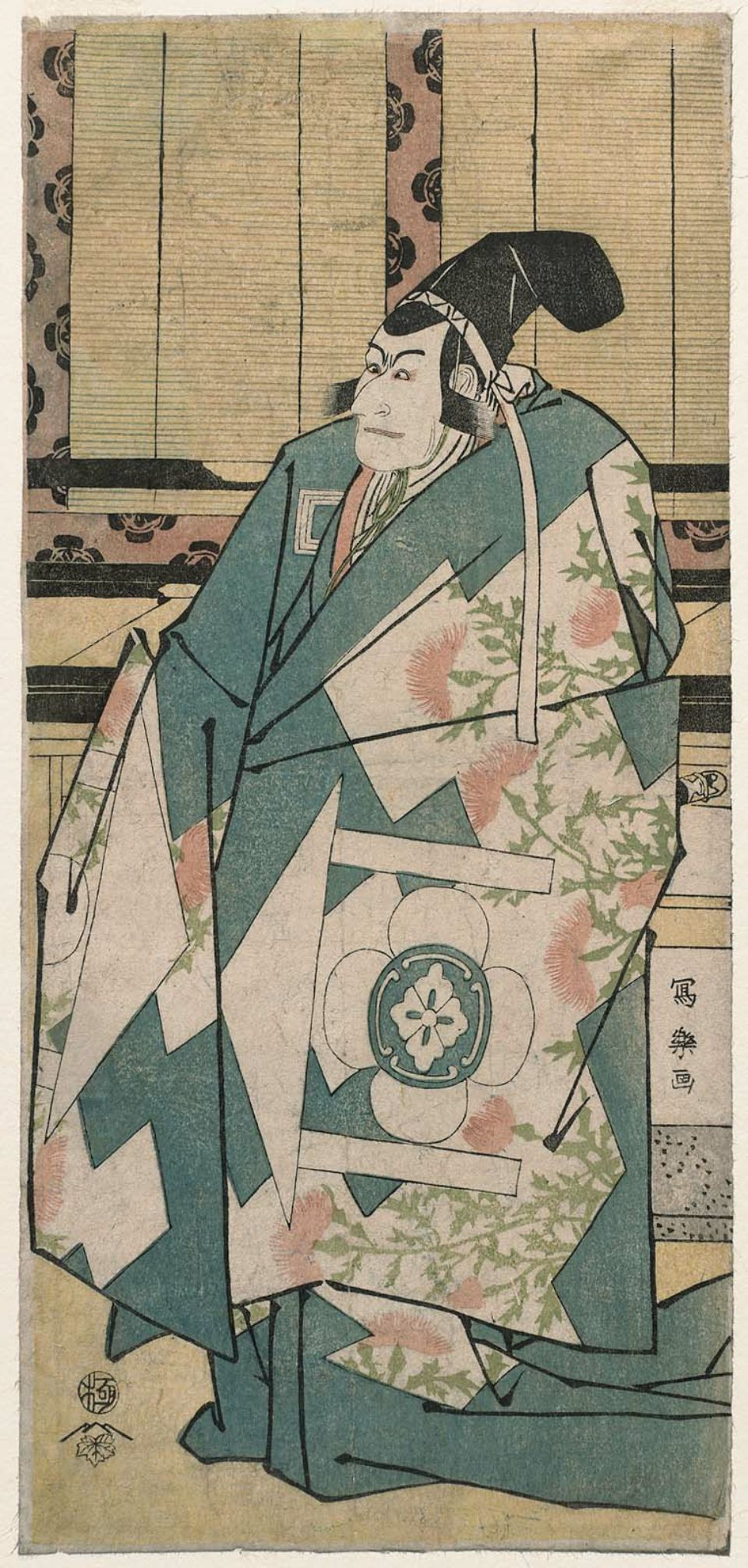
Ichikawa Ebizō as Kudō Saemon Suketsune

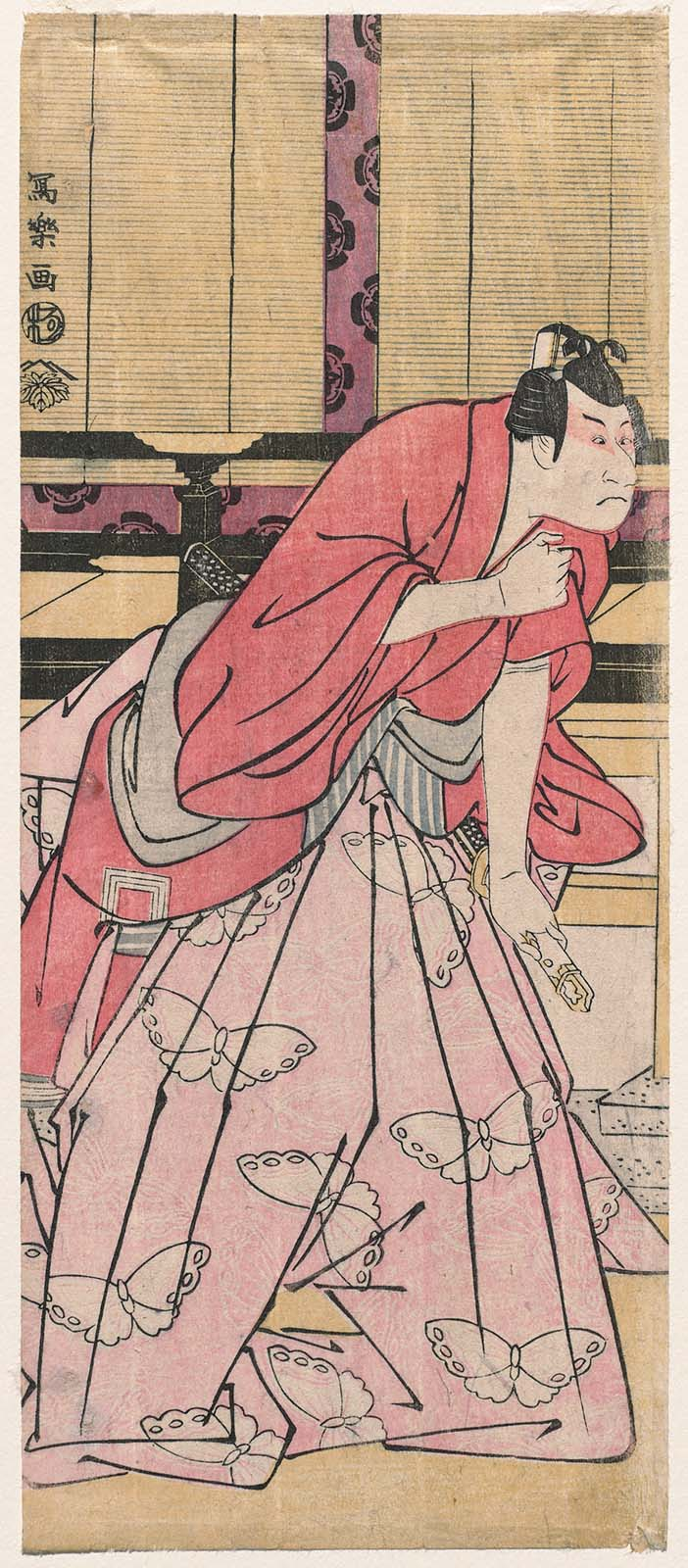
Ichikawa Danjūrō VI as Soga no Gorō Tokimune

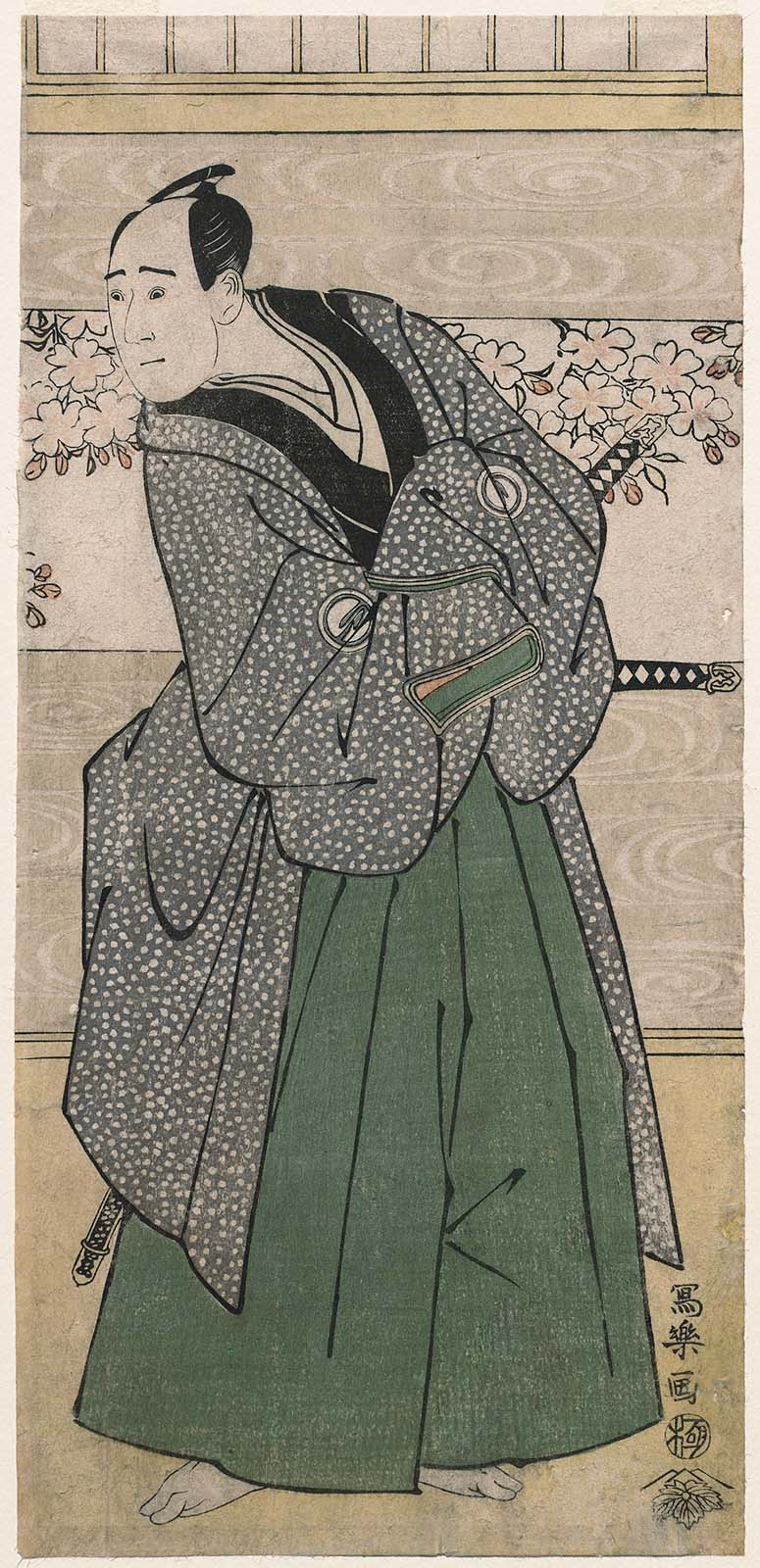
Sawamura Sōjūrō III as Satsuma Gengobei

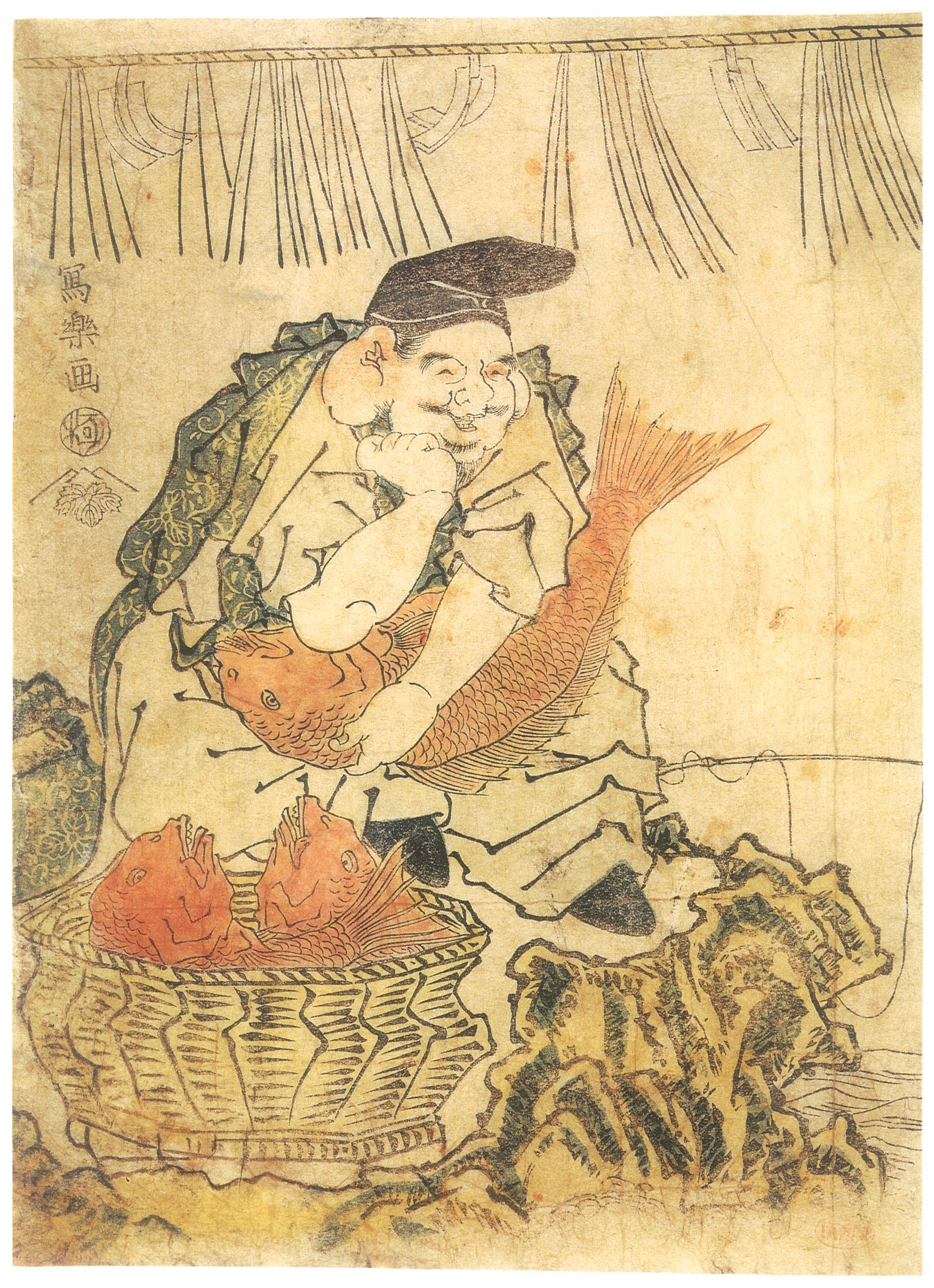
Ebisu

== Style and analysis ==
Energy and dynamism are the primary features of Sharaku's portraits, rather than the idealized beauty typical of ukiyo-e—Sharaku highlights unflattering features such as large noses or the wrinkles of aging actors.

In his actor prints Sharaku usually depicts a single figure with a focus on facial expression. To Muneshige Narazaki Sharaku was able "to depict, within a single print, two or three levels of character revealed in the single moment of action forming the climax to a scene or performance". In contrast to the static actor prints of a contemporary artist such as Katsukawa Shun'ei, who emphasized the narrative moment of his subjects in the plays depicted, Sharaku focused on the actor's and character's psychology, delivering an "almost caricature-like exaggeration, a heightened sense of theatrical gesture", according to art historian David Bell. Occasionally two figures appear, revealing a contrast of types, as of different facial shapes, or a beautiful face contrasted with one more plain.

Most ukiyo-e artists gained apprenticeship experience and connections by working for an artistic school, such as the Torii or Utagawa school. Sharaku did not, which likely contributed to his failure to find a sufficient audience to succeed. Sharaku shows the skill of a master, despite scant evidence that he had prior experience designing prints. Nonetheless, from the first Sharaku's prints appeared amongst the technical vanguard, with unusually realistic portrayals of their subjects and using extravagant techniques such as the dusting of mica in the backgrounds. From such beginnings, though, the quality of his work quickly fades.

To Jack Ronald Hillier, there are occasional signs of Sharaku struggling with his medium. Hillier compares Sharaku to French painter Paul Cézanne, who he believes "has to struggle to express himself, hampered and angered by the limitations of his draughtsmanship".

== Identity ==
Ukiyo-e artists had low social status, and what personal details remain in the record tend to be sparse; Sharaku nevertheless presents an exceptional case in the utter absence of these details. Biographers have long searched, but have had no luck in shining light on the identity of Sharaku. The popularity the prints have attained feeds interest in the mystery, which in turns contributes further to interest the prints. Of the more than fifty theories proposed, few have been taken seriously, and none has found wide acceptance.

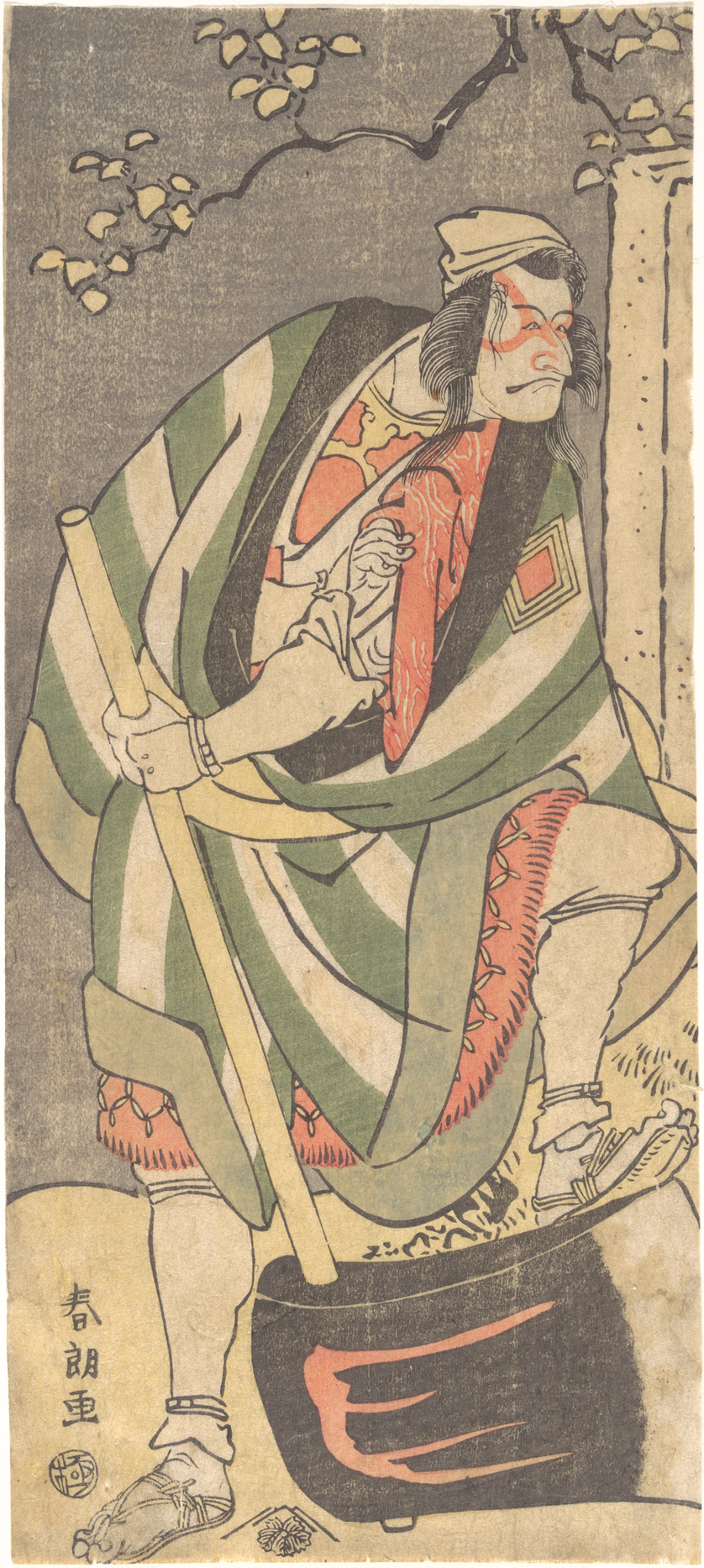
Ichikawa Ebizō, Hokusai, 1791

Sharaku has been speculated to have been either a Noh actor, a poet from Western Japan, or even Hokusai.

A book on haiku theory and aesthetics from 1776 includes two poems attributed to a Sharaku, and references to a Nara poet by the same name appear in a 1776 manuscript and a 1794 poetry collection. No evidence aside from proximity in time has established a connection with the artist Sharaku. A Shinto document of 1790 records the name Katayama Sharaku as husband of a disciple of the sect in Osaka. No further information is known of either the disciple or her husband. A resemblance of Sharaku's kinetic kabuki portraits to those of Osaka-based contemporaries Ryūkōsai and Nichōsai has further fueled the idea of an Osaka-area origin.

Rare calendar prints from 1789 and 1790 that bear the pseudonym "Sharakusai" have surfaced; that they may have been by Sharaku has not been dismissed, but they bear little obvious stylistic resemblance to Sharaku's identified work.

Though disputed, Sharaku's prints have been said to resemble the masks of Noh theatre; connections have been deduced from numerous documents that suggest to some researchers that Sharaku was a Noh actor serving under the lord of Awa Province, in modern Tokushima Prefecture. Amongst these documents are those that suggest Sharaku died between 1804 and 1807, including a Meiji-era manuscript that specifies the seventeenth day of the fifth month of 1806, and that his grave was marked in Kaizenji Temple in Asakusa in Edo. Other similar theories, some discredited, include those that Sharaku was Noh actor Saitō Jūrōbei, (Note: 斎藤 十郎兵衛 Saitō Jūrōbei) Harutō Jizaemon, (Note: 春藤 次左衛門 Harutō Jizaemon) or Harutō Matazaemon. (Note: 春藤 又左衛門 Harutō Matazaemon)

In 1968 Tetsuji Yura proposed that Sharaku was Hokusai. The claim is also found in the Ukiyo-e Ruikō ("Various Thoughts on Ukiyo-e"), and Sharaku's prints came during an alleged period of reduced productivity for Hokusai. Though known primarily for his landscapes of the 19th century before Sharaku's arrival Hokusai produced over a hundred actor portraits—an output that ceased in 1794. Hokusai changed his art name dozens of times throughout his long career—government censorship under the Kansei Reforms (Note: The Kansei Reforms put restrictions with severe penalties on luxurious displays by the common people. Tsutaya's publication of an Utamaro portrait of a woman printed with mica in the background ink was considered too opulent, and Tsutaya had half his fortune seized. Penalties for other publishers included the confiscation or destruction of their printing blocks.) may have motivated him to choose a name to distance his actor portraits from his other work. As ukiyo-e artists normally do not carve their own woodblocks, a change in carver could explain differences in line quality.

Others proposed identities include Sharaku's publisher Tsutaya or Tsutaya's father-in-law; the artists Utamaro, Torii Kiyomasa, Utagawa Toyokuni, or Maruyama Ōkyo; the painter-poet Tani Bunchō; the writer Tani Sogai; an unnamed Dutch artist; or actually three people. Yet another proposed identity is the author Santō Kyōden; Tani Minezō points out that Sharaku's brief career is concurrent with Kyōden's temporary break from writing gesaku due to grief over the sudden death of his wife Kikuzono around 1793.

== Reception and legacy ==
The Edo public reacted poorly to Sharaku's portraits. More copies of the larger, first-period works remain, suggesting they enjoyed greater popularity than the later works; most for which only a single copy remains come from the later periods.

Contemporaries such as Utamaro who also worked in a relatively realistic style presented their subjects in a positive, beautifying way. Sharaku did not avoid depicting less flattering aspects of his subjects—he was the "arch-purveyor of vulgarities" to 19th-century art historian Ernest Fenollosa. An inscription on Utamaro's portrait of 1803 appears to target criticism at Sharaku's approach; appearing eight years after Sharaku's supposed disappearance suggests that Sharaku's presence was still somehow felt, despite his lack of acceptance.

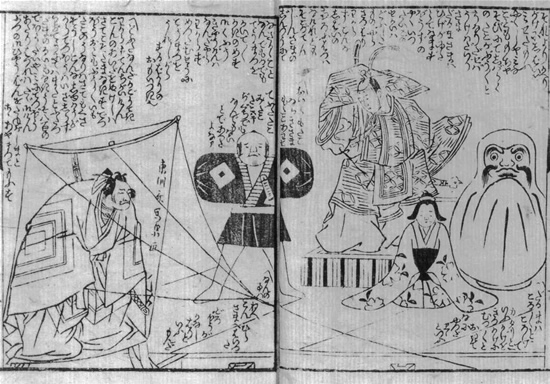
Sharaku's Ichikawa Ebizō IV appears on a kite on a page of Jippensha Ikku's Shotōzan Tenarai Hōjō (1796)

The subject of an Eishōsai Chōki portrait of Takashimaya O-Hisa holds a hand fan decorated with Sharaku's Kōshirō Matsumoto IV as Sakanaya Gorobee. On a decorated kite illustrated in Jippensha Ikku's book Shotōzan Tenarai Hōjō (1796) appears Sharaku's depiction of kabuki actor Ichikawa Ebizō IV; the accompanying text is filled with puns, jargon, and double entendres that have invited interpretation as commentary on the decline of Sharaku's later works and events surrounding his departure from the ukiyo-e world, including speculation that he had been arrested and imprisoned. Ikku published under Sharaku's publisher Tsutaya from late 1794, and the book is the earliest to mention Sharaku. The Ukiyo-e Ruikō, the oldest surviving work on ukiyo-e, contains the oldest direct comment on Sharaku's work:

"Sharaku designed likenesses of kabuki actors, but because he depicted them too truthfully, his prints do not conform to accepted ideas, and his career was short, ending after about a year." (Note: 「これは歌舞伎役者の似顔をうつせしが、あまり真を画かんとて、あらぬさまにかきなせしば長く世に行われず一両年にて止む」)

The Ukiyo-e Ruikō was not a published book, but a manuscript that was hand-copied over generations, with great variations in content, some of which has fueled speculation as to Sharaku's identity. including a version (Note: The Kazayamabon Ukiyo-e Ruikō of 1822) that calls Sharaku "Hokusai II". Shikitei Sanba wrote in 1802 of ukiyo-e artists, and included an illustration of active and inactive artists and their schools as a map; Sharaku appears as an inactive artist depicted as a solitary island with no followers. Essayist Katō Eibian wrote in the early 19th century that Sharaku "should be praised for his elegance and strength of line".

Sharaku's work was popular among European collectors, but rarely received mention in print until German collector Julius Kurth's book Sharaku appeared in 1910. Kurth ranked Sharaku's portraits with those of Rembrandt and Velázquez, and asserted Sharaku was Noh actor Saitō Jūrōbei. The book ignited international interest in the artist, resulting in a reevaluation that has placed Sharaku amongst the greatest ukiyo-e masters. In his Chats on Japanese Prints of 1915 Arthur Davison Ficke declared, "Sharaku stands on the highest level of genius, in a greatness unique, sublime, and appalling." The first in-depth work on Sharaku was Harold Gould Henderson and Louis Vernon Ledoux's The Surviving Works of Sharaku in 1939. Certain portraits such as Ōtani Oniji III are particularly well known.

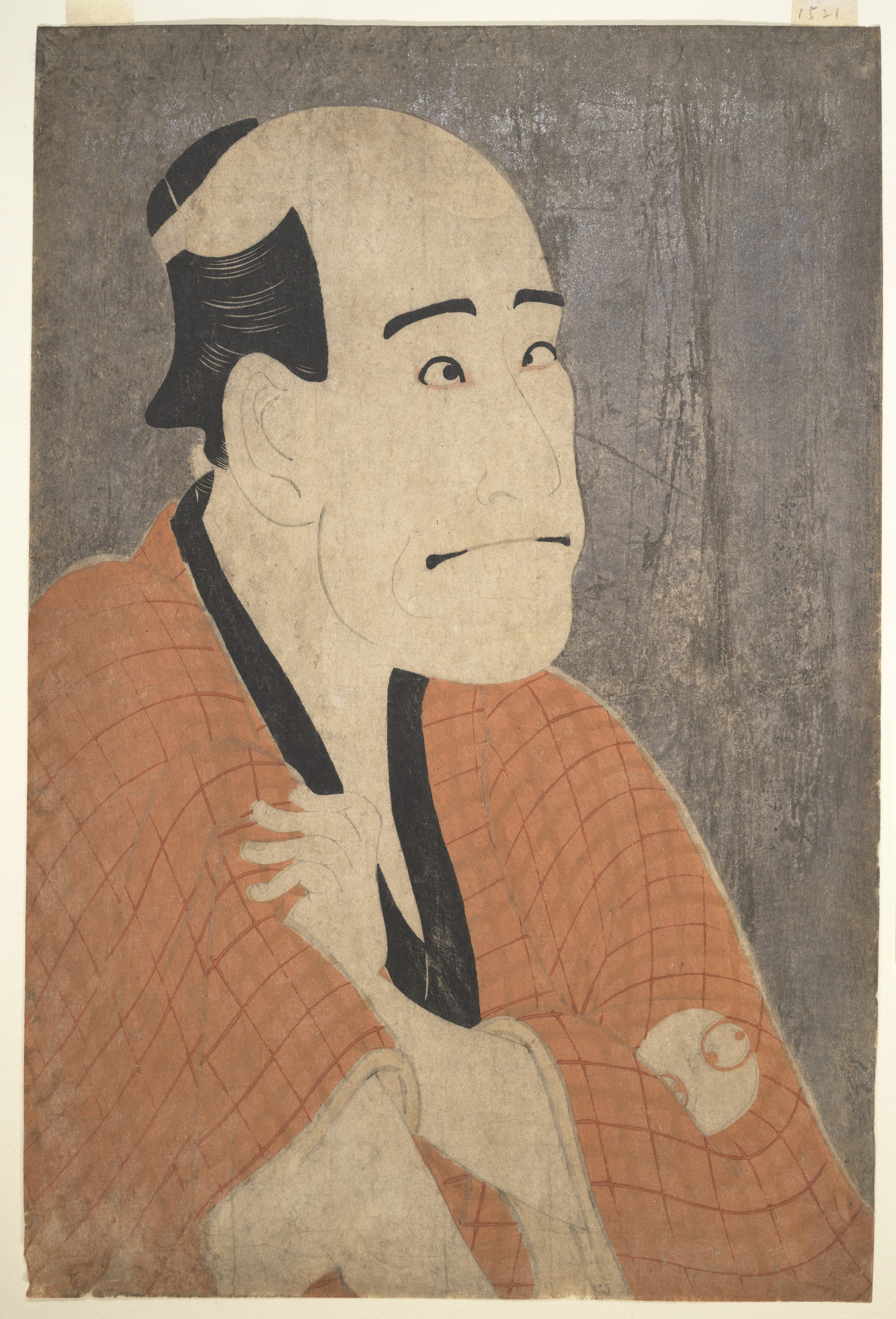
Arashi Ryūzō I as Ishibe Kinkichi (1794) set a record price for an ukiyo-e print sold at auction.

Just over 600 copies of Sharaku's prints are known; only about 100 remain in Japan. As they are in collections scattered throughout the world general research on Sharaku's works has followed different threads in Japan and the West has proved time-consuming. Japanese researchers have better knowledge of and access to documents and literature related to Sharaku's time and conditions. On the other hand, Sharaku's works tend to be in Western collections, including prints for which only one copy is known—of which there are about three dozen. Sharaku's ōban prints with mica backgrounds most likely cost more than the average, though prices can be only speculated due to a lack of records. (Note: Determining at what prices prints sold is a challenge for experts, as records of hard figures are scanty and there was great variety in the production quality, size, supply and demand, and methods, which went through changes such as the introduction of full-colour printing. How expensive prices can be considered is also difficult to determine as social and economic conditions were in flux throughout the period.) Values of the prints today vary depending on size, condition, and subjective quality. Prices for them at auction have risen steadily from the turn of the 19th and 20th centuries: for a print with a mica background sold in Japan prices jumped from a typical 15 yen (roughly a third of a banker's initial monthly salary) in 1895 to 300 yen in 1915. Sharaku's Arashi Ryūzō I as Ishibe Kinkichi sold at Sotheby's for US$25000 in 1975, at Christie's for GBP£22000 in 1989, and €389,000 at Piasa in Paris in 2009, setting a record auction price for a Sharaku print.

Identifying the period into which Sharaku's work falls posed difficulties that have since become clear. The prints bear no dates. Kurth first proposed that they spanned the nine years of 1787 to 1795. Further research led Kazuo Inoue (ja) to reduce the date span to 17 months from 1794 to 1795, which Henderson and Ledoux further narrowed to 10 months in those years. Such dates have been determined based on comparative research into theatre programmes and chronologies.

Soviet filmmaker Sergei Eisenstein believed that objective realism was not the only valid means of expression. He found Sharaku "repudiated normalcy" and departed from strict realism and anatomical proportions to achieve expressive, emotional effects.

1983 saw the appearance of the novels Phantom Sharaku by Akiko Sugimoto—a novel whose protagonist is Tsutaya—and The Case of the Sharaku Murders by Katsuhiko Takahashi. In 1995 Masahiro Shinoda directed a fictionalized film of Sharaku's career, Sharaku.
