= 清 =

清 or 淸, meaning 'clear' or 'clean', may refer to:

- Cheong, a Korean cuisine
- Kiyoshi, a masculine Japanese given name
- Qing (disambiguation), Chinese transliteration
- Sei (disambiguation)#People, a Japanese–Ryukyuan name

== See also ==
- Cheong (disambiguation)
