= Japan Society of Civil Engineers =

Scientific nonprofit organization

- Founded: 1914
- Type: Professional Scientific Organization
- Purpose: Science, Education, Professional Development
- Location: Sotobori Park, Yotsuya 1-chome, Shinjuku-ku, Tokyo JAPAN 160-0004
- Region served: Worldwide
- Method: Lectures, Symposia, Workshops, Publications
- Key people: Kiyoshi Kobayashi, President 2018-19
- Website: http://www.jsce-int.org/

Japan Society of Civil Engineers (JSCE) (土木学会, doboku gakkai) is a professional scientific nonprofit organization of the civil engineering field of Japan. It was established as an incorporated association in 1914 and its offices are located in Yotsuya, Shinjuku, Tokyo. JSCE currently has 35,553 members.
