= Ukiyo-e Ruikō =

Japanese collection of commentaries and biographies of ukiyo-e artists

The Ukiyo-e Ruikō (浮世絵類考, "Various Thoughts on Ukiyo-e") is a Japanese collection of commentaries and biographies of ukiyo-e artists. It did not appear in print during the Edo period in which it was produced, but was circulated in handwritten copies subject with numerous additions and alterations. The writer Ōta Nanpo produced the first version in 1790.

More than 120 variants of the Ukiyo-e Ruikō are known. An edition with updates by Santō Kyōden, Sasaya Shishichi Kuninori, and Shikitei Sanba in 1802 is the earliest extant copy, produced under the title Ukiyo-e Kōshō. This version lists 37 artists and focuses mainly on ukiyo-e painters and major print designers. The ukiyo-e artist Keisai Eisen produced a continuation of the work around 1833, titled Zoku Ukiyo-e Ruikō and also known as Mumei'ō Zuihitsu, providing an updated account of the lives of ukiyo-e artists.

The document has also served as evidence in later scholarly debates over the identity of the ukiyo-e artist Sharaku: in 1968, Tetsuji Yura cited the Ukiyo-e Ruikō in support of a theory identifying Sharaku with Hokusai, arguing that Sharaku's prints were produced during a presumed period of reduced output for Hokusai.

The Ukiyo-e Ruikō ranks artists regarded for their paintings higher than those mainly associated with their print designs, and highlights artists training in painterly schools such as the Kanō or painting traditions such as Yamato-e, suggesting the prestige painting held over printing.
