= Kiyoshi Kiyosawa =

Japanese journalist and writer

- Born: 8 February 1890; Kitahotoka Village (now Azumino), Nagano, Japan
- Died: 21 May 1945 (aged 55); Tsukiji, Tokyo, Japan

Kiyoshi Kiyosawa (清沢 洌 Kiyosawa Kiyoshi, 8 February 1890 – 21 May 1945) was a Japanese journalist and writer who is most well-known for his wartime diary that was written between 1942 and 1945, but was first published under the name of A Diary of Darkness (暗黒日記) after the war, in 1948, where it caused a sensation. It was first published in the English-speaking world as A Diary of Darkness: The Wartime Diary of Kiyosawa Kiyoshi in 1999. Kiyosawa had a liberal perspective which supported free speech, and as a result most of his diary is dedicated to criticism of the militaristic atmosphere of the Japanese public, the decisions of the military government during the war, and increasing bureaucracy. He was friends with the fellow liberal journalist Tanzan Ishibashi, who appears several times in his diary entries and who would later become the prime minister of Japan.

== Biography ==
Kiyosawa was born in Nagano prefecture, but later moved to the United States in 1906. He became the chief of the Tacoma branch of the Japanese-language Seattle newspaper "North American Current Affairs" (北米時事). In 1914, he switched over to the "New World" newspaper in San Francisco, another major Japanese newspaper. In 1918, Kiyosawa returned to Japan to work for the Kanagawa Trading Company in Yokohama, and continued to work in the worlds of business and journalism throughout the 1920's. In 1919, he switched over to the Chugai Shogyo Simpo newspaper (today known as the Nikkei) and became a writer on foreign affairs, particularly Korea, Manchuria, and China. He advocated for relinquishing Japan's colonial claims and focusing on being a trade nation, a position then known as "Little Japanism."

In the 1930s, he switched to become a freelance writer. Kiyosawa was critical of Japanese newspapers in the militaristic era because they reinforced the hysteria of the Japanese public to chase profit and increase readership rather than publishing critical viewpoints. The Japanese education system was also a common theme in his writings for the same reason, that is, they only promote one view and did not permit opposing views. He also criticised the education system for excessive focus on technical subjects conducive to the military rather than subjects such as the humanities. Finally, in 1941, the Cabinet Information Bureau placed Kiyosawa on its list of censored persons who were forbidden to speak. In 1943, Kiyosawa founded the Japanese Institute for Diplomatic History (日本外交史研究所) with future prime minister Hitoshi Ashida.

Throughout his life, he was influenced by some contemporary Japanese Christians, such as those in the non-church movement, although he never became a Christian himself.

Kiyosawa died on 21 May 1945 from acute pneumonia shortly before the war ended.

== Legacy ==
Kiyosawa's diaries are among the most notable war-time diaries in Japan given that they voice private thoughts that were not allowed to be published at the time, and also show examples of how every day people behaved in the militaristic atmosphere. Takashi Naganuma, who was at one time the secretary general of Kiyosawa's hometown of Azumino, claimed that reading Kiyosawa's essays dissuaded him from supporting the war after having been a Navy Air Corps flight trainee who was "struck by militarism from head to toe."

In 2013, Kiyosawa's daughter Mariko donated the original manuscripts of the Diary of Darkness to Azumino City and its archives.

== See also ==
- Yoko Moriwaki
