= Yoko Moriwaki =

Diarist and atomic bomb victim (1932–1945)

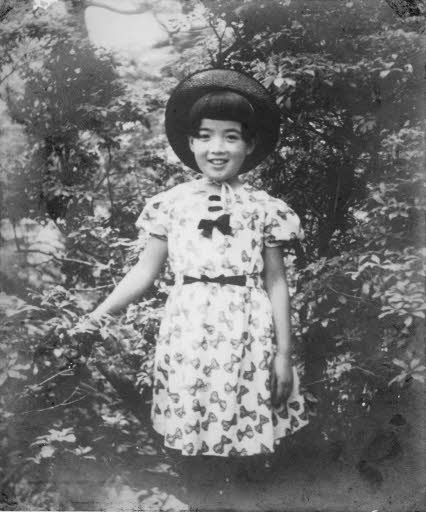
- Portrait of Yoko Moriwaki
- Born: 7 June 1932; Hiroshima, Japan
- Died: 6 August 1945 (aged 13); Hiroshima, Japan
- Writing career
- Language: Japanese

Yoko Moriwaki (森脇 瑤子, Moriwaki Yōko; 7 June 1932 – 6 August 1945) was a thirteen-year-old Japanese schoolgirl who lived in Hiroshima during World War II. Her diary, a record of wartime Japan before the bombing of Hiroshima, was published in Japan in 1996. It was published by HarperCollins in English in 2013 as Yoko's Diary.

She lived in Hiroshima during World War II and died during the atomic bombing of the city by the United States. Her brother, Koji Hosokawa, who survived the attack on Hiroshima, made her diary available for publication. In 2018, he donated some of her surviving items, including her school uniform and lunch box, to the Hiroshima Peace Memorial Museum.

Moriwaki started keeping her diary as an assignment at her school, the Hiroshima Prefectural Girls' HS #1. In addition to chronicling her daily life, it kept a record of wartime Japan, covering topics from what classes she was taking to sightings of war planes flying overhead. The diary starts on 6 April 1945, shortly before she started school, and the last entry is from 5 August 1945, the day before the atomic bomb was dropped on Hiroshima. Although she survived the initial bombing, she was badly burned on her back, legs, and hands, and crawled for hours to safety until she was picked up by a military vehicle and taken to a relief center. She was comforted by a local housewife named Hatsue Ueda, who reported that Moriwaki asked "Isn't Mother here yet?" before her death from her injuries that same day.

Moriwaki has been compared by Westerners to fellow World War II diarist Anne Frank, known for her record of being Jewish in the Netherlands during the War. Like Moriwaki, Frank died during the course of the war.
