= Ch'ŏngsansŏng =

Ancient fortress in Buyeo, South Korea

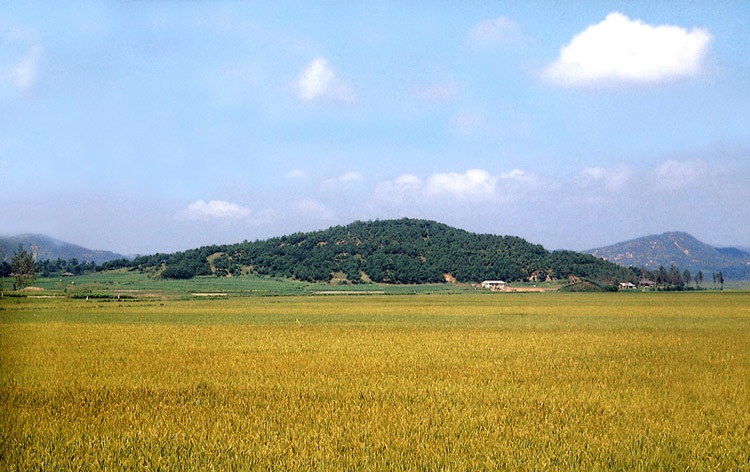
- The former location of the fortress
- Interactive map of the Ch'ŏngsansŏng area

General information
- Location: Buyeo County, South Chungcheong Province, South Korea
- Coordinates: 36°17′41″N 126°55′44″E

Design and construction
- Designations

Historic Sites of South Korea
- Designated: 1963-01-21
- Reference no.: 59

Ch'ŏngsansŏng (Korean: 청산성; Hanja: 靑山城; RR: Cheongsanseong) was a Baekje-era Korean fortress in Buyeo County, South Chungcheong Province, South Korea. On January 21, 1963, its former location was declared Historic Site of South Korea No. 59.

It was possibly built around 605 (Korean calendar). It is connected to the Naseong City Wall, and was possibly built around the same time as that wall. The fortress had two sets of walls, an inner wall with circumference 300 m (980 ft) and outer wall with circumference 500 m (1,600 ft). It was on top of a small mountain. It is mentioned in the Samguk sagi. The only significant remains of the fortress that still exist are earthen ramparts.
