= Kiyoshi Kobayashi (professor) =

Japanese academic

Kiyoshi Kobayashi (小林 潔司, Kobayashi Kiyoshi) is the current (2018–19) president of the Japan Society of Civil Engineers, Director of the Management Research Center of the Graduate School of Management and Professor of Engineering, Infrastructure Economics and Management at the Department of Urban Management of Kyoto University. He was born in 1953 in Himeji, Hyōgo, Japan.

== Life and academic career ==
Kobayashi got his B.Sc. in civil engineering from Kyoto University in 1976, his M.Sc. from Kyoto University in 1978 and his PhD from Kyoto University in 1984. He is the recipient of several awards and prizes for his research, including the Hinomaru Prize in 1988, the JSCE (Japan Society of Civil Engineers) Research Prize in 1993, 2001 and 2007. In 2007 he was included in the Top 50 City Creators and Urban Experts of the Ministry of the Environment of Denmark.

From 1978 to 1986, Kobayashi was a research associate in the Graduate School of Engineering of Kyoto University. In 1987 he became an associate professor at the Department of Social Systems Engineering at Tottori University, where in 1990 he became a full-time professor. In 1996 he returned to Kyoto University as a full-time professor at the Graduate School of Engineering. In 2006 he became the vice dean of the Graduate School of Management of Kyoto University and in 2010 he became the dean. He held that position until April 2012.

== Research activities ==
- 1985, research scholar, International Institute for Applied Systems Analysis, Austria
- 1986-1988, visiting scholar, CERUM (Center of Regional Science), Umeå University
- 1987-1990, visiting scholar, Institute for Futures Studies, Sweden
- 1989–present, editorial board member, The Annals of Regional Science
- 1994-1998, editorial board member, Journal of JSCE
- 1997-2002, editor-in-chief, Journal of Applied Regional Science
- 1999–present, editorial board member, Papers in Regional Science
- 2001-2003, secretary, Japan Society of Civil Engineers (Planning Division)
- 2002-2006, editorial board member, American Society of Civil Engineers
- 2004-2005, vice president, Applied Regional Science Conference
- 2006–present, co-editor in chief, American Society of Civil Engineers
- 2006–present, editor in chief, Japan Journal of Civil Engineering
- 2006–present, member of Japan Council of Infrastructure
- 2006–present, member of Japan Council of Transport Policy
- 2007–present, president, Applied Regional Science
- 2007–present, member of Japan Academy of Science

== Works ==
- Ake E. Andersson, David F. Batten, Kiyoshi Kobayashi, and Kazuhiro Yoshikawa, (eds.), 1993, The Cosmo-Creative Society, Logistical Networks in a Dynamic Economy, Springer-Verlag, Berlin, Heidelberg, New York, London,
- Kiyoshi Kobayashi and Ake E. Andersson, 1999, Creativity and the Future of Metropolis, Morikita.
- Kiyoshi Kobayashi, 1999, Cities in Knowledge Society, Morikita.
- K. Kobayashi, H. Westlund, K. Matsushima (eds.)，2005，Social Capital and Development Trends in Rural Areas, MARG.
- K. Ito, H. Westlund, K. Kobayashi and T. Hatori(eds.), 2006, Social Capital and Development Trends in Rural Areas, Vol.2, MARG.
- K. Kobayashi, T. R. Lakshmanan, and W. P. Anderson, 2007, Structural Change in Transportation and Communications in the Knowledge Society, Edward Elgar
- C. Scawthorn C. and K. Kobayashi, 2008, Asian Catastrophe Insurance, Risk Books.
- K.Kobayashi, A.R. Khairuddin, G.Ofori, and S.Ogunlana, S. (eds.), 2009, Joint Ventures in Construction, Thomas Telford.
