= Ōta Nanpo =

Japanese poet and writer (1749–1823)

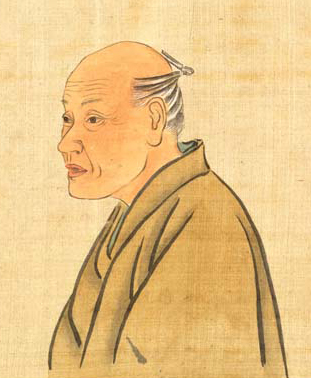
Ōta Nanpo

Ōta Nanpo (大田 南畝; April 19, 1749 – May 16, 1823) was the most oft-used pen name of Ōta Tan, a late Edo-period Japanese poet and fiction writer. Ōta Nanpo wrote primarily in the comedic forms of kyōshi, derived from comic Chinese verse, and kyōka, derived from waka poetry. Ōta Nanpo's pennames also include Yomo no Akara (四方赤良), Yomo Sanjin, Kyōkaen, and Shokusanjin (蜀山人; Japanese pronunciation: [ɕo.kɯ̥.saꜜɲ.dʑiɴ, ɕo.kɯ̥.saɲ.dʑiꜜɴ]).

Born into a lower-status samurai family in Edo, Nanpo served the shogunate in various ways throughout his life. He began his literary career as a student of Chinese Ming-dynasty writings, and adapted traditional Chinese comic verse (called kyōshi in Japanese), under the mentorship of playwright Hiraga Gennai, to daily life in Edo. His first collection of work was called Neboke sensei bunshū, or the Literary Works of Master Groggy.

Nanpo soon began to write kyōka, comic waka verses, as well. His popularity grew in the 1760s and 1770s, as a result of his down-to-earth subject matter and unabashed style. During this time he also wrote a number of works of popular literature, and edited a collection of comic verses called Manzai kyōkashū, which truly cemented his position as a central literary figure of his time.

For political reasons, he was forced to abandon his writings for a time in the 1780s. He committed himself for several years to shogunal duties, but eventually returned to poetry.

Nanpo also collaborated with many different artists such as Hokusai, Eishi, Hokuba, Sakai Hōitsu and many others. Many paintings bears his original calligraphy and poem, he also worked together with artists in making prints, surimono and ehon. Nanpo made calligraphies (calligraphy) mainly in the tanzaku and kakemono format. He also produced paintings; these are now extremely rare.

The most famous of Nanpo's paintings are in the album Shokusanjin ennyo meisekishu ("A collection of Shokusanjin memorabilia"). The album consists of 41 double pages of letters, paintings, fan paintings, sketches, and poems; ink and colour on paper and silk. The album size is 15 × 9in (40 x 24 cm). Date;1804. All of the works bears Nanpo's writing. Some works was coproduced and inscribed by other gifted people. The inscribed works includes examples by the kabuki actor Ichikawa Danjūrō V, the geisha Katsu, the courtesan Nareginu, the kyōka master Shikatsube Magao, the novelist Santō Kyōden, and the kanshi (Chinese-style verse) poets Kikuchi Gozan and Ōkubo Shibutsu. There are paintings by the ukiyo-e artists Hokusai and Hokuba in the album. A further two fan paintings, one with a Chinese-style landscape by Haruki Nanmei (1795–1878) and a playful image of the Chinese poet Li Bai in his cups by Unshitsu Dojin, shows Shokusanjin's links to the more aloft of the literati artists.

The album is a compendium of material documenting the interaction between prominent members of literary, theatre, and art circles of the day. Shokusanjin as Nanpo signs himself here produced two small sketches which were mounted into the album. The first sketch is of a geisha and the other of an oiran (courtesan).

The album is in the Chiba city Museum of Art, ex. provenance; Azabu Museum and Anders Rikardson Collection.

Nanpo produced the first version of the Ukiyo-e Ruikō (浮世絵類考, "Various Thoughts on Ukiyo-e") in 1790. The Ukiyo-e Ruikō is a collection of commentaries and biographies of ukiyo-e artists was circulated in handwritten copies subject with numerous additions and alterations over the years; it did not appear in print in the Edo period.
