= Kiyoshi Uchiyama =

Japanese diplomat

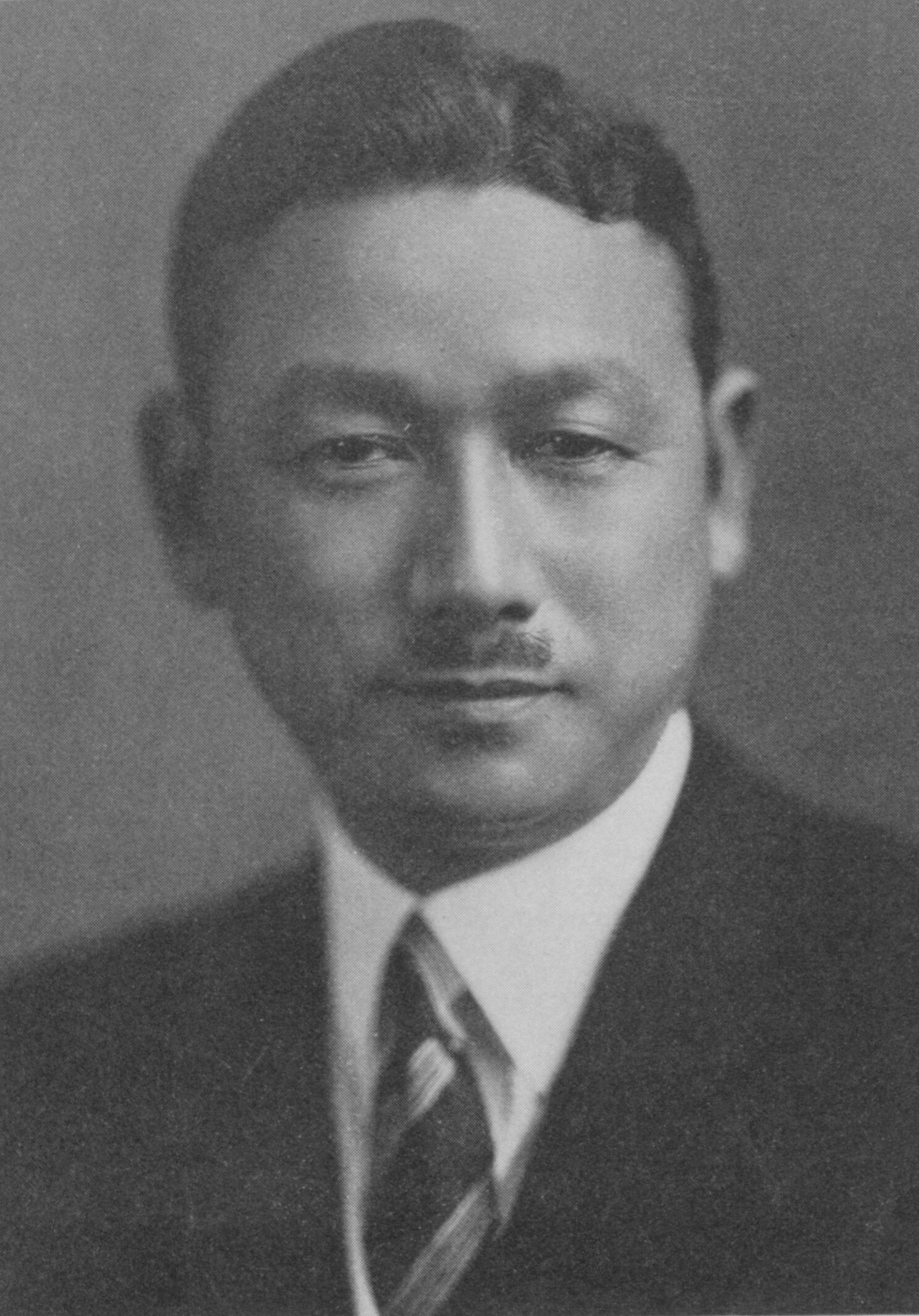

Kiyoshi Uchiyama (内山 清, Uchiyama Kiyoshi) was a Japanese diplomat.

In the 1930s he was Japan's consul in Seattle, and was involved in the investigation of the bombing of Japanese-owned farms in the Yakima Valley in the state of Washington during racial unrest related to Filipino agricultural laborers. From 1931 to 1933, as part of ongoing Japanese efforts to keep strong diplomatic ties with the US, he toured Washington state extensively, lecturing for many major organizations on the Sino-Japanese conflict; his efforts were described as "indefatigable". In 1935 he advocated the teaching of Japanese in US high schools to bring East and West closer together, and defended the Japanese invasion of Manchuria in an atmosphere of anti-Japanese sentiment.

At the beginning of World War II, he was consul-general to the Philippines stationed in Manila, trying to gain support from the Filipinos for Japan. In the buildup to the war Uchiyama implemented the Japanese policy of subsidizing Japanese farmers in the Philippines.
