= Avatar: The Last Airbender – The Shadow of Kyoshi =

2020 novel by F.C. Yee and Michael Dante DiMartino

- Author: F.C. Yee; Michael Dante DiMartino
- Illustrator: Jung Shan Chang
- Language: English
- Series: Chronicles of the Avatar
- Genre: Fantasy
- Publisher: Amulet Books
- Publication date: July 21, 2020
- Publication place: United States
- ISBN: 978-1-4197-3505-9
- Preceded by: The Rise of Kyoshi

Avatar: The Last Airbender – The Shadow of Kyoshi is an American fantasy novel and the second young adult novel written by American authors F.C. Yee and Avatar co-creator Michael Dante DiMartino in the Chronicles of the Avatar novel series, published in July 2020. It is based on the character Kyoshi and the Avatar franchise created by Michael Dante DiMartino and Bryan Konietzko. It is a New York Times bestseller.

Set in the world of the animated television series Avatar: The Last Airbender, it takes place 400 years prior to the series and follows the life of Kyoshi, an Avatar born in the Earth Kingdom, two generations before Aang. Yee cited several "old school kung fu movies" and John Wick as influences.

== Synopsis ==
One year after being discovered as the Avatar, Kyoshi travels the world subduing petty criminals and searching for Yun, her childhood friend who was misidentified as the Earth Avatar and presumed dead at the hands of a spirit named Father Glowworm. Kyoshi is also attempting to decipher her predecessor Avatar Kuruk's pleas for her help. Kyoshi's aid is requested by Fire Lord Zoryu of the Fire Nation, who explains that the Fire Nation is suffering from a famine and his avaricious older half-brother Chaejin is taking advantage of the tension to raise support for a coup and claim the throne for himself. She also reunites with her friend and lover Rangi. During a banquet at the royal palace, the group is attacked by Yun, who seeks revenge on everyone who ever lied to him about being the Avatar, including Rangi's mother Hei-Ran. Yun kills several palace guards before escaping, and Avatar Kyoshi concludes that Father Glowworm has possessed him.

Avatar Kyoshi, Rangi, and Hei-Ran travel to North Chung-Ling to seek the counsel of Kuruk's former companion Nyahitha, who offers to aid her in contacting Avatar Kuruk's spirit for advice against Father Glowworm. After defusing a confrontation between Zoryu's supporters and Chaejin's henchmen led by his mother Huazo, Nyahitha attempts to guide Avatar Kyoshi into the Spirit World, to little success. After the session, a message saying "Hail Fire Lord Chaejin" is burned into some local farmland, provoking a full-scale battle between Zoryu's and Chaejin's supporters. Yun takes advantage of the distraction to attack Hei-Ran, who barely survives when Kyoshi squanders an opportunity to pursue him in order to save her. Kyoshi deduces that Yun is working with Chaejin to undermine Zoryu in exchange for help in his crusade against his former mentors. Hei-Ran realizes that if a link between the two can be proven, Chaejin's coup will lose all legitimacy.

Avatar Kyoshi captures Huazo and Chaejin and threatens to kill them unless they give up Yun, but Avatar Kuruk's spirit admonishes her and she realizes that they aren't actually working with Yun. When she returns to the royal palace, she discovers that Fire Lord Zoryu has arrested an imposter of Yun and intends to execute him to stop the war, then purge Chaejin's entire clan. Kyoshi rescues the imposter, but Fire Lord Zoryu warns her that she must find the real Yun before his duplicity is revealed and a civil war is sparked. Kyoshi travels to the ruins of an island charged with spiritual energy and finally opens a direct line of communication with Kuruk. The Water Avatar shows her a memory of a confrontation with Father Glowworm, enabling her to track Yun, and reveals that although Yun has consumed Father Glowworm's powers upon merging with him, he is still in total control of his own actions.

Avatar Kyoshi pursues Yun to their childhood home, the estate of their deceased former mentor Jianzhu. Yun, now completely deranged and vengeful for having been deceived, swears to kill everyone who falsely worshiped him as the Avatar, leaving Avatar Kyoshi with no choice but to battle him. Aided by Rangi and her former companions in the Flying Opera Company, Avatar Kyoshi kills Yun in a final battle. In the aftermath, Fire Lord Zoryu plans to go through with his purge of Chaejin's clan, but is stopped by Avatar Kyoshi through her old mentor Lao Ge. This confrontation leads Zoryu to come up with the idea of stripping all clans of influence, leaving the Fire Lord as supreme ruler.

== Reception ==
Insider called it a "character-driven and full of worldbuilding details that make it a rewarding read for both Avatar fans and newcomers alike", referring to its "weighty, political conflict [a]s just as thrilling as the action sequences" of the series and its "intense, pivotal moments [making] a harrowing read, bringing an emotional resonance and vibrancy that cuts through the page". Screen Rant lauded Yee's use of "a far darker and more tragic ending than anything the Avatar: The Last Airbender franchise has ever seen before", noting it for "plac[ing] great emphasis on the mental and emotional toll" of being the Avatar, expressing interest in a future television adaptation of the series, a sentiment echoed by Den of Geek and Comic Book Resources.
