= Kiyoshi Arai =

Japanese baseball player

- Infielder
- Born: April 11, 1969 (age 56)
- Batted: Both Threw: Right

NPB debut
- April 16, 1993, for the Yakult Swallows

Last appearance
- July 3, 2001, for the Yokohama BayStars

Teams
- Yakult Swallows (1991–1996); Yokohama BayStars (1997–2000); Orix BlueWave (2001–2002)

Kiyoshi Arai is a former professional baseball player for Japan. He initially played in the California League for the Salinas Spurs He later played for the Yakult Swallows in the Japan Central League. He later played for Yokohama BayStars in the Japan Central League and the Orix BlueWave in the Japan Pacific League.
