= Kyōshi =

Form of Japanese poetry using only Chinese characters

Kyōshi (狂詩) or "wild poetry," is a hybrid form of Japanese poetry that uses the tradition of kanshi (Japanese poetry written in Chinese characters). It was popular around 1770-1790 and avoids typical poetic forms, often including humorous expressions and puns on alternate readings or meanings of the same characters.

Mostly written by low-ranking samurai and chōnin (townspeople), the form is closely related to kyōka (comic waka), kyōbun ("wild prose") and, senryū, a form of Japanese comic poetry. The subject matter typically contains components of social satire, banter, and vulgar topics such as farting and/or itching which challenges the more conventional styles of Japanese poetry like classical waka.

The form of poetry was very popular for a short time, having gained majority of its popularity during the age of Tanuma Okitsugu (c. 1780–1786) but declined quickly and disappeared after the turn of the 19th century.

Although Kyōshi was a rather frivolous poetry style, its intended audience remained relatively small and restricted to the samurai class due to its challenging rules and "Chinese-style versifications."

== History ==
The true origin of kyōshi poetry is somewhat unclear due to its subjective nature however, it is said to have had an extensive history, dating back to the Heian period.

Some notable works of kyōshi include kyōshi of the medieval "mad" monk poet Ikkyū (1394–1481) and the formal album of Zen monk Bunshi, Nanpo bunshū (1615) which included early forms of playful or comical wording.

The first conventional publication of kyōshi poetry was Kobun teppō zengo shū (Treasures of ancient lie-terature, first and last installments; 1761).

=== Notable Pioneers ===
Two pioneers that played a significant role in the birth and development of kyōshi were Ōta Nanpo (1749–1823) in Edo an Dōmyaku Sensei (1752–1801) in Kyoto.

Nanpo, who published Neboke Sensei bunshū shohen (Master Groggy's literary collection, part the first, 1767), gained popularity for his comical style and literary parodies. Dōmyaku Sensei, who published Taihei gafu (Ballads for an age of great tranquility, 1769), was recognized for his social criticism and satire.

The contribution of both their publications strongly established the two poets' reputations as experts of the literary genre and contributed to a small collection of kyōshi 'classics'.

==== To Master Groggy, from Afar ====
Below is kyōshi written by Dōmyaku Sensei from Taihei gafu, addressed to Ōta Nanpo:

Priests make a brothel's flushest clients;

Among buddhas, Zuigu is foremost.

But I get a chilly reception at all the teahouses;

My bills have piled into mountains.

Pleasures and reprimands jointly accumulate;

Relatives hold solemn family council to debate my case.

But I head straight for the brothels, make the long

nights fly by-

Even by breakfast, I'm still not home.

The day I'm disowned, whenever that may be,

I'll make my way to the East.

Just as I reached the last word in looniness

I happened to make the acquaintance of Master Groggy.

(Marcus, 26)

== Purpose ==
Throughout the early eighteenth century, there was little opportunity for poets and followers of the Ogyū Sorai school to express discontent with contemporary society and politics other than through conventional and elegant Chinese poetry. As a result, an alternate approach had developed and the mindset of a "mad person" (kyōsha) would emerge as the foundation for kyōshi.

Kyōshi poetry was used by the poets Ōta Nanpo and Dōmyaku Sensei as a way to express discontent with contemporary society. Additionally, during the late eighteenth century, samurai who considered themselves "mad", used kyōshi as forms of expression.

As collections of kyōshi were published, it became more clear that the primary intent of kyōshi was to loosely conform to formal poetic requirements while portraying satirical parodies of contemporary Japanese life with the use of slang and/or obscenity.

== Development ==
The majority kyōshi's development occurred during the eighteenth century, serving as an expression of the last periods of the Tokugawa Rule. A result of the later Edo period, kyōshi was published in large quantity while authors and poets began the early development of "schools".

By the 1720s, kyōshi was on obvious genre unto itself and further, the publishment of Nanpo and Dōmyaku Sensei's kyōshi collections served as a fundamental step in the dissemination of the poetic style.

There was a brief resurgence in the 1880s after kyōshi poets discovered new and useful content for their art within discrepancies of the new Meiji order however, by the nineteenth century, preference for conventional waka and kanshi poetry was re-established, and kyōshi was ultimately discarded as a poetic style.
