= Avatar: The Last Airbender – The Rise of Kyoshi =

2019 novel by F.C. Yee and Michael Dante DiMartino

- Author: F.C. Yee; Michael Dante DiMartino
- Illustrator: Jung Shan Chang
- Language: English
- Series: Chronicles of the Avatar
- Genre: Fantasy
- Publisher: Amulet Books
- Publication date: July 16, 2019
- Publication place: United States
- ISBN: 978-1-419-73504-2
- Followed by: The Shadow of Kyoshi

Avatar: The Last Airbender – The Rise of Kyoshi is an American fantasy novel and the first young adult novel written by American authors F.C. Yee and Avatar co-creator Michael Dante DiMartino in the Chronicles of the Avatar novel series, published in July 2019. It is based on the character Kyoshi and the Avatar franchise created by Michael Dante DiMartino and Bryan Konietzko. It is a New York Times bestseller.

Set in the world of the animated television series Avatar: The Last Airbender, it takes place 400 years prior to the series and follows the life of Kyoshi, an Avatar born in the Earth Kingdom, two generations before Avatar Aang, and three before Avatar Korra.

The second book in the series, titled The Shadow of Kyoshi, was released on July 21, 2020.

== Synopsis ==
Seven years after the death of 33-year-old Avatar Kuruk of the Northern Water Tribe, his companions Jianzhu and Kelsang, a powerful Earth Kingdom sage and an Air Nomad, respectively, search the Earth Kingdom for the next Avatar. They come to Yokoya village to try and find the Avatar among the children there. Kyoshi, then a homeless outcast child left in the village by her outlaw parents, briefly participates in their test, but runs off midway through it, unused to displays of kindness. She is later taken in by Kelsang, who becomes a father figure to her.

Nine years later, young Kyoshi works as a servant in a mansion built to accommodate Yun, an Earth Kingdom teenager whom Jianzhu has identified as the Avatar, and who is one of Kyoshi's friends. Yun's identity as the Avatar is thrown into question after Kyoshi performs a feat of Avatar-level earthbending during a confrontation with pirates. Jianzhu, Yun, and Kyoshi seek the counsel of a spirit who confirms Kyoshi is the true Avatar, then attacks Yun; Jianzhu abandons Yun to die and murders Kelsang when he confronts him. The resultant trauma causes Kyoshi to go into the mighty Avatar State and nearly kill Jianzhu. She swears vengeance and flees the mansion with her friend Rangi, a teenage firebender serving as Yun's bodyguard.

Kyoshi follows the instructions left in a journal left by her parents to enlist the aid of the Flying Opera Company, her parents' former outlaw gang now consisting of the earthbenders Lek and Wong, the waterbender Kirima, and the immortal assassin Lao Ge. They take her to the outlaw town Hujiang, where they are strong-armed into helping a powerful crime syndicate calling itself the Autumn Bloom Society break one of its members out of prison in Zigan. Over the course of the next month, Kyoshi and Rangi confess their love for each other, Kyoshi reveals herself as the Avatar to the Flying Opera Company, and her bending companions teach her to master the four elements. Lao Ge teaches her how to prolong her own life and enlists her aid in assassinating the corrupt governor of Zigan, Te Sihung.

Kyoshi and the Autumn Bloom besiege Zigan and rescue the prisoner, and Kyoshi spares Governor Te after discovering he is only a teenager. The prisoner is revealed to be Xu Ping An, a ruthless gang lord who terrorized the Earth Kingdom years ago before apparently being defeated by Jianzhu. When Xu attacks and attempts to murder an innocent family of farmers, Kyoshi unleashes the Avatar State and kills him in a duel. Meanwhile, Jianzhu seeks to bring the Avatar back under his control; he poisons several Earth Kingdom nobles and Rangi's mother Hei-Ran, then sends assassins who capture Rangi and kill Lek. Kyoshi confronts Jianzhu, who is killed by a surviving Yun. In the aftermath, Kirima and Wong decide to lie low, Rangi travels to the Northern Water Tribe to seek healing for Hei-Ran, Lao Ge vanishes, and Kyoshi travels to the Southern Air Temple to reveal herself as the Avatar. There, she is approached by the spirit of Avatar Kuruk.

== Reception ==
Entertainment Weekly called it a "stunning revitalization of Avatar storytelling", and observed how the use of prose enabled a deeper exploration of the worldbuilding. Kirkus Reviews lauded Yee's use of "political entanglements (and) complex cultural identities", but noted that familiarity with the source material was necessary for "full enjoyment".
