= Avatar Aang: The Last Airbender (soundtrack) =

2026 film soundtrack album

Avatar Aang: The Last Airbender (Music from the Motion Picture)

Film score by Jeremy Zuckerman
- Released: July 24, 2026
- Recorded: 2025–2026
- Studios: Newman Scoring Stage, 20th Century Studios, Los Angeles; Barbara Streisand Scoring Stage, Sony Pictures Studios, Culver City; The Village, Los Angeles
- Genre: Film score
- Length: 87:39
- Label: Milan
- Producer: Jeremy Zuckerman

Jeremy Zuckerman chronology
A Body in the Snow: The Trial of Karen Read (2025)	Avatar Aang: The Last Airbender (2026)

Avatar Aang: The Last Airbender (Music from the Motion Picture) is the film score composed by Jeremy Zuckerman to the 2026 film Avatar Aang: The Last Airbender directed by Lauren Montgomery, which is the continuation of the animated television series Avatar: The Last Airbender (2005–2008). The original score featured 36 tracks, along with few songs performed by Varijashree Venugopal, Hong Waig, Vanessa Freebairn-Smith and Celia Liu. The album was released through July 24, 2026, a day prior to the film's release through Paramount+, through Milan Records.

== Background ==
Jeremy Zuckerman, who composed for the animated series, returned to score the film in November 2025. Zuckerman said that he was granted full access to an orchestra, stating that the bigger budget for the film enables him to try new things he could not do on the television series due to technological limits at the time. For the musical voice of Sonam, Grammy Award-winning Indian flautist Varijashree Venugopal was brought to provide themes for the character. Bryan Konietzko stated that Zuckerman was connected through Venugopal from a mutual friend, and both musicians worked on the project Seven Havens based on the franchise. Konietzko and Montgomery acknowledged the Indian influences in the show and their interest to lean towards ancient cultures' mysticism, fantasy and spirituality across India, that provided an ethereal quality of Sonam which Venugopal's voice provided that haunting quality.

== Release ==
The soundtrack was released through Milan Records on July 24, 2026, a day prior to the film's worldwide release on Paramount+.

== Track listing ==
No.	Title	Artist(s)	Length
1.	"Aang's Dream"		2:44
2.	"Our Old Home – Looking for Relics"		1:39
3.	"The Denied – Avatar State"		3:55
4.	"The Four Elements"		3:43
5.	"Who Is Sonam?"		3:18
6.	"Avatar Xian – Note to Katara"		2:45
7.	"Need Your Help – Southern Water Tribe"		0:44
8.	"Earth Kingdom – Greatest Earthbender in the World"		0:59
9.	"Mount Baihu"		2:12
10.	"Man in the Ice"		1:25
11.	"Escape from Avalanche"		2:43
12.	"Tagah Wakes"		1:55
13.	"Tagah's Tale"		1:06
14.	"Sonam's Staff – The Great Sphere"	Varijashree Venugopal	3:40
15.	"Heal the Past"		1:54
16.	"Bond That Tethers"		1:24
17.	"Under the Stars"		1:23
18.	"Sky Attack"		1:25
19.	"The Immortal Storm"		3:14
20.	"Push Forward"		3:21
21.	"Lion Turtle Islands"	Varijashree Venugopal	2:50
22.	"Sonam's Grotto"		2:59
23.	"Betrayal"		2:42
24.	"Recruits"		2:25
25.	"Sonam's Story"		3:47
26.	"Resurrected"		0:59
27.	"The Ocean Spirit"		1:13
28.	"Out of Balance"		1:05
29.	"Great Spirit"		1:45
30.	"Confrontation"		1:31
31.	"Battle for Republic City"		6:07
32.	"Tagah Transformed"		2:29
33.	"Aang Overcomes"		3:47
34.	"Return to the Eternal Wind"	Hong Wang; Vanessa Freebairn-Smith	2:44
35.	"The Original Airbenders"		2:52
36.	"Sonam's Song"	Varijashree Venugopal; Celia Liu	2:55
Total length:			87:39

== Reception ==
Sam Nelson of Polygon wrote "Jeremy Zuckerman handled the music for Avatar and Korra, and in Avatar Aang, he's created another awe-inspiring score that shows his mastery for building tension and creating exultant moments of peace and triumph." Reuben Baron of Looper wrote "The franchise has never looked better, and Jeremy Zuckerman's musical themes have never sounded better." Allyson Johnson of But Why Tho stated "The return of composer Jeremy Zuckerman is another key feature that adds to the grounding of this world, which so often takes flight. His compositions are (pardon) instrumental to the epic-scale atmosphere that the series and now film produce. By melding different styles of music and influences, it conjures the feeling of living in a world so overtaken by spiritual influence and endless wonders. That youthful exuberance in the belief that anything is possible with friends by your side and endless skies ahead."

== Personnel ==
Credits adapted from Paramount Music:

- Music composer and producer: Jeremy Zuckerman
- Music editor: Kevin Crehan
- Choir lyrics: Rohner Segnitz
- Conductor: Anthony Parnther, Joey Newman
- Lead orchestrator: Jeff Kryka
- Orchestrators: Brian Herald, David Neville
- Music preparation supervision: Thanh Tran
- Music preparation: Madison Lam, Benjamin Allendorf, Kyle Vu, Nathan Vu, Hannah Doan, Victoria Sun
- Recording and mixing: Scott Michael Smith
- Score recorded at: Newman Scoring Stage, Fox Studio Lot; Barbra Streisand Scoring Stage, Sony Pictures Studios; The Village Studios, Los Angeles, California
- Pro Tools recordists: Larry Mah, Chandler Harrod, Jeff Fitzpatrick, and Allise Laymac
- Scoring stage recordists: Tim Lauber and Keith Ukrisna
- Scoring stage managers: Hoss Yekband, Peter Nelson, Damon Tedesco, Jeff Fitzpatrick, Greg Dennen
- Scoring stage engineers: Jim Wright and Assen Stoyanov
- Fox executive sound staff: Stacey Robinson (Vice President, Post Sound Operations)
- Sony executive sound staff: Julianne McCormack
- Score mixed at: Studio S, The Village Studios, Los Angeles, California
- Score coordinator: Taylor Lipari-Hassett
- Score mix assistant: Jacob William Bauman
- Assistant engineer: Pedro Laet
- Soundtrack album mastering: Stephen Marsh, Justin Fleuriel (Marsh Mastering, Los Angeles)
- Art direction: Dan Goldwasser at Warm Butter Design
- Orchestra contractor: Mark Robertson
- Choir contractor and conductor: Jasper Randall
- Vocal coordination: Pat Cahill

Featured musicians

- Indian vocals and flute: Varijashree Venugopal
- Erhu, zhonghu, chaoer, dizi, xiao, xun, and duduk: Hong Wang
- Guzheng and pipa: Celia Liu
- Guzheng: Jeremy Zuckerman
- Native American flutes: Tony Duncan
- Featured cello: Vanessa Freebairn-Smith
- Featured percussion: Brian Kilgore

Orchestra musicians

- Violins: Mark Robertson (concert master), Alyssa Park, Abby Abdel-Khalek, Agatha Blevinaiko Richter, Ana Landauer, Ben Jacobson, Bruce Dukov, Camille Miller, Chad Cannon, Charlie Bisharat, Christian Hebel, Daphne Chen, Delaney Harter, Ellen Jung, Eugenia Choi, Eun-Mee Ahn, Haesol Lee, Jennifer Choi Fischer, Jessica Guideri, Jiyoung An, Jordan Ann Martone, Katie Sloan, Luanne Homzy, Maia Jasper, Marisa Kuney, Max Karmazyn, Mina Hong, Nicolai Kurganov, Paul Henning, Radu Pieptea, Rene Mandel, Robert Chen, Roger Wilkie, Shalini Vijayan, Steve Zander, Tammy Hatwan, Tereza Stanislav, Yu-Tong Sharp, Yvette Holzwarth
- Violas: Andrew Duckles, Alma Fernandez, Carolyn Riley, Corinne Sobolewski, David Walther, Erik Rynearson, Hanbyul Jang, Jonah Sirota, Jonathan Moerschel, Leah Katz, Linnea Powell, Luke Maurer, Meredith Crawford, Rhea Hosanny, Rob Brophy
- Cellos: David Low, Alisha Bauer, Ben Lash, Charlie Tyler, Chris Ahn, David Mergen, Evgeny Tonka, Ginger Murphy, Hillary Smith Ahn, Irina Chirkova, Jacob Braun, Jason Lippman, Julie Jung Yoo, Leah Metzler, Mindia Luo, Trevor Jarvis
- Double basses: Tom Harte, Eric Shetzen, Evan Hillis, Ian Walker, Luca Alemanno, Nate Farrington, Ryan Baird, Stephanie Payne, Steve Pfeifer, Timothy Eckert
- Flutes: Amy Tatum, Jenni Olson
- Oboes: Jennifer Cullinan, Marissa Honda
- Clarinets: Joshua Ranz, Chris Stoutenborough, Jonathan Sacdalan
- Bassoons: Andrew Brady, Alex Rosales Garcia, Jonathan Stehney
- French horns: Dylan Hart, Danielle Ondarza, David Cooper, John Mason, Laura Brenes, Lisa McCormick, Sarah Bach, Stephanie Thomas, Teag Reaves
- Trumpets: Rob Schaer, Adam Bhatia, Barry Perkins, Wayne Bergeron
- Trombones: Nick Daley, Alan Kaplan, Ido Meshulam, Jim Miller, Noah Gladstone, Steve Suminski
- Tuba: Gabriel Sears
- Cimbasso: Scott Sutherland
- Percussion: Brian Kilgore, Ted Atkatz
- Timpani: Wade Culbreath
- Harp: Alison Bjorkedal

Choir vocalists

- Sopranos: Anna Schubert, Andrea Zomorodian, Suzanne Waters, Julia Metzler, Alina Roitstein, Elissa Johnston, Janet Szepei Todd, SunJoo Yeo, Kathryn Shuman, Courtney R. Taylor, Ayo Awosika, Chloé Malia Vaught, Madeline Reynolds, Karen L. Mitchell
- Altos: Callista Hoffman-Campbell, Lindsay Patterson Abdou, Sara Mann, Jessica Rotter Murphy, Jessie Schulman, Niké St. Clair, Lesley Leighton, Sharon Chohi Kim, Sarah Lynch, Baraka May, Emily Lasalle, Laura Flores Jackman, Rebecca Tomasko
- Tenors: Gerald White, Michael Lichtenauer, Jj Lopez, Todd Strange, David Morales, Adrien Redford, Dermot Kiernan, Jamal M. Moore, Saunder Choi, Jon Lee Keenan, Edmond Rodriguez, Fletcher Sheridan, Frank Hobbs
- Basses: James Hayden, Luc Kleiner, Dylan Gentile, Abdiel González, Ben Han-Wei Lin, Scott T. Graff, Michael Bannett, Reid Bruton, Chung Uk Lee, Mark Edward Smith, David A. Castillo, Brett McDermid, Joe Santoni

== Charts ==
Chart performance for Avatar Aang: The Last Airbender (Music from the Motion Picture)
Chart (2026)	Peak position
UK Classical Albums (Official Charts)	9
