= Avatar Studios =

American production company

- Type: Division
- Industry: Animation
- Founded: February 2021; 5 years ago
- Founder: Nickelodeon
- Headquarters: Burbank, California, U.S.
- Key people: Eric Coleman (CEO); Michael Dante DiMartino (CCO); Bryan Konietzko (CCO)
- Brands: Avatar: The Last Airbender
- Owner: Skydance Corporation
- Parent: Nickelodeon Animation Studio
- Website: www.avatarstudiosofficial.com

Avatar Studios is an American production company and a division of Nickelodeon Animation Studio. it was formed in February 2021 to oversee the Avatar: The Last Airbender franchise. Franchise co-creators Michael Dante DiMartino and Bryan Konietzko serve as co-chief creative officers.

== Background ==
Avatar: The Last Airbender, an animated television series created by Michael Dante DiMartino and Bryan Konietzko, aired on the cable channel Nickelodeon from 2005 to 2008. During its run, it would achieve high ratings as well as garner critical acclaim and several awards. It was succeeded by a sequel series, The Legend of Korra, which ran from 2012 to 2014. The property would grow into a multi-media franchise consisting of an ongoing comics series, a prequel novel series, video games, and a live-action film.

== History ==
In 2018, Netflix announced that a live-action remake of Avatar: The Last Airbender was to start production in 2019. The series' original creators, Michael Dante DiMartino and Bryan Konietzko, were initially announced to be the executive producers and showrunners. In June 2020, the creators departed the series due to creative differences. That same year, Nickelodeon licensed the original The Last Airbender as well as The Legend of Korra to Netflix, which led to a resurgence in popularity for both series. This success convinced Nickelodeon to rekindle their relationship with Konietzko and DiMartino and explore further opportunities.

In February 2021, ViacomCBS announced during its annual Investor Day the formation of Avatar Studios, a new division of Nickelodeon centered on developing animated series and films set in the universe of the franchise, to be distributed via Nickelodeon's linear and digital services, Paramount+, theatres, and other third-party platforms. The division is helmed by DiMartino and Konietzko, who are its co-chief creative officers and report to Nickelodeon Animation Studio president Ramsey Ann Naito. It was also announced that the studio's first project would be an animated theatrical film that was initially planned to begin production in 2021.

The film, titled Avatar Aang: The Last Airbender, released on Paramount+ on July 25, 2026. It serves as a continuation of the original animated series. In June 2022, it was reported that two additional theatrical animated films were also in the works, but as of 2026, the creators stated that no additional films are in production. In February 2025, it was announced that a new series, titled Avatar: Seven Havens, was in production at Avatar Studios, as well as an additional untitled series directed by co-creator Bryan Konietzko. At the 2026 New York Comic Con, this series was revealed to be Avatar Kuruk: Wave of Chaos.

== Filmography ==
=== Films ===
Film	Release date	Director	Screenplay by	Story by	Producers	Composer	Animation services	Production status	Ref.
Avatar Aang: The Last Airbender	July 25, 2026	Lauren Montgomery Co-directors: William Mata; Steve Ahn	Tim Hedrick; Christopher Yost	Bryan Konietzko; Michael Dante DiMartino; Tim Hedrick; Kenneth Lin	Maryann Garger; Latifa Ouaou; Bryan Konietzko; Michael Dante DiMartino	Jeremy Zuckerman	Flying Bark Productions / Studio Mir / Studio Ppuri	Released	

=== Television series ===
Years	Title	Season(s) / Episode(s)	Creator(s) / Developer(s)	Animation services	Network	Production status	Ref.
2026–present	Avatar: Seven Havens	1 season 13 episodes	Michael Dante DiMartino; Bryan Konietzko Developed by: Sehaj Sethi	La Chouette Compagnie	Paramount+	Airing (Season 2 planned to be release in May 2027) Renewed for seasons 3 and 4	
TBD	Avatar Kuruk: Wave of Chaos	1 season TBD	Bryan Konietzko	TBD	Paramount+	Ordered	
