= Avatar: The Last Airbender (franchise) =

Skydance media franchise

- Created by: Michael Dante DiMartino; Bryan Konietzko
- Original work: Avatar: The Last Airbender (2005–2008)
- Owners: Nickelodeon Group (Skydance)
- Years: 2005–present

Print publications
- Books: List of books
- Comics: List of comics

Films and television
- Films: The Last Airbender (2010); Avatar Aang: The Last Airbender (2026)
- Television series: Avatar: The Last Airbender (2024–present)
- Animated series: Avatar: The Last Airbender (2005–2008); The Legend of Korra (2012–2014); Avatar: Seven Havens (2026–present)
- Television shorts: Avatar Chibi Shorts (2007); Republic City Hustle (2013); Avatar: Chibi Minis (2025–2026)

Games
- Video games: List of video games

Audio
- Soundtracks: List of soundtracks

Official website
- https://www.avatarstudiosofficial.com/

Avatar: The Last Airbender, also known as Avatar Legends, is an American multimedia franchise created by Michael Dante DiMartino and Bryan Konietzko. The franchise began with the animated television series Avatar: The Last Airbender, which aired on Nickelodeon from 2005 to 2008. The franchise is set in an Asian-inspired fantasy world in which some people can telekinetically manipulate (or "bend") one of the four classical elements: air, water, earth, or fire. Only the titular "Avatar" can bend all four elements and is responsible for maintaining balance in the world.

Avatar is a franchise spanning works in various forms of media. A sequel animated series to Avatar: The Last Airbender, The Legend of Korra, ran from 2012 to 2014. The storylines of both animated series have been continued in comic book form. Other franchise tie-ins include novelizations, art books, companion books, video games, and home media releases. In 2010, the first season of the original animated series was adapted into a live-action film titled The Last Airbender. A live-action television remake of the original series, also named Avatar: The Last Airbender, was co-produced by Netflix and premiered in 2024.

In February 2021, Nickelodeon announced the formation of Avatar Studios, a division dedicated to the creation of Avatar projects. The first project, an animated sequel film titled Avatar Aang: The Last Airbender, released in July 2026. A second sequel series, Avatar: Seven Havens, premiered in October 2026.

== Premise ==
The franchise is set in an Asian-inspired fantasy world that is divided into four nations: the Water Tribes, the Fire Nation, the Air Nomads, and the Earth Kingdom. People of each nation are capable of telekinetically manipulating (referred to as "bending" in the franchise) one of the four elements: water, earth, fire, or air.

The titular "Avatar" is the only person who can bend all four elements, and they are responsible for maintaining spiritual and physical balance in the world. After an Avatar's death, the Avatar Spirit, Raava, is reborn into a new person of a different nation, who is the new Avatar and who must master the bending arts of the four elements, and take on their Avatar responsibilities.

== Television series ==
Four television series make up the Avatar franchise: The Last Airbender (animated, 2005–2008), The Legend of Korra, The Last Airbender (live-action, 2024–present), and Seven Havens. All series in total amount to 141 episodes across 10 seasons of television.

Series	Season	Name	Episodes	Originally released			Showrunner(s)	Status
Series	Season	Name	Episodes	First released	Last released	Network	Showrunner(s)	Status
Animated series
Avatar: The Last Airbender	1	Water	20	February 21, 2005	December 2, 2005	Nickelodeon	Michael Dante DiMartino; Bryan Konietzko	Concluded
Avatar: The Last Airbender	2	Earth	20	March 17, 2006	December 1, 2006	Nickelodeon	Michael Dante DiMartino; Bryan Konietzko	Concluded
Avatar: The Last Airbender	3	Fire	21	September 21, 2007	July 19, 2008	Nickelodeon	Michael Dante DiMartino; Bryan Konietzko	Concluded
The Legend of Korra	1	Air	12	April 14, 2012	June 23, 2012	Nickelodeon	Michael Dante DiMartino; Bryan Konietzko	Concluded
The Legend of Korra	2	Spirits	14	September 13, 2013	November 22, 2013	Nickelodeon	Michael Dante DiMartino; Bryan Konietzko	Concluded
The Legend of Korra	3	Change	13	June 27, 2014	August 22, 2014	Nickelodeon	Michael Dante DiMartino; Bryan Konietzko	Concluded
The Legend of Korra	4	Balance	13	October 3, 2014	December 19, 2014	Nickelodeon	Michael Dante DiMartino; Bryan Konietzko	Concluded
Avatar: Seven Havens	1	Survival	13	October 9, 2026	October 30, 2026	Paramount+	Ethan Spaulding	Released
Avatar: Seven Havens	2	Discovery	13	May 21, 2027	June 11, 2027	Paramount+	Ethan Spaulding	In production
Avatar: Seven Havens	3	TBA	13	2027	TBA	Paramount+	Ethan Spaulding	In production
Avatar: Seven Havens	4	TBA	TBA	TBA	TBA	Paramount+	Ethan Spaulding	In production
Avatar Kuruk: Wave of Chaos	1	TBA	TBA	TBA	TBA	Paramount+	Bryan Konietzko	In development
Live-action series
Avatar: The Last Airbender	1	–	8	February 22, 2024		Netflix	Albert Kim; Christine Boylan	Released
Avatar: The Last Airbender	2	–	7	June 25, 2026		Netflix	Albert Kim; Christine Boylan	Released
Avatar: The Last Airbender	3	–	TBA	2027		Netflix	Albert Kim; Christine Boylan	Post-production

=== Animated series ===
==== Avatar: The Last Airbender (2005–2008) ====
The first series in the franchise, Avatar: The Last Airbender follows the young Avatar Aang as he attempts to end the Fire Nation's war of conquest against the other three nations. Aang, who is the last surviving Air Nomad due to a genocide perpetrated by the Fire Nation, is joined by a teenage waterbender of the Southern Water Tribe, Katara, her non-bending brother Sokka, and later the young blind earthbending prodigy Toph, as he journeys to master bending the elements so that he can defeat the Fire Nation's leader, Fire Lord Ozai, and restore peace throughout the four nations. The series also depicts the journey of Prince Zuko, Ozai's disgraced and exiled son, as he tries to restore his honor. When Ozai exiled him, he sent him on a quest to find the Avatar, a task thought impossible at the time. Zuko stays devoted to capturing Aang throughout the first season, but would go on to join Aang’s group later in the series.

==== The Legend of Korra (2012–2014) ====
Set 70 years after the original series, The Legend of Korra follows Aang's successor as the Avatar, a waterbender from the Southern Water Tribe named Korra, who moves to the new, multi-ethnic Republic City to learn airbending from Aang's youngest son, Tenzin. She befriends a firebending and earthbending pair of brothers, Mako and Bolin, and the industrial heiress Asami Sato, and contends with a series of political upheavals, including a rising anti-bending movement, a civil war in the Water Tribes, an anarchist conspiracy, and the rise of an authoritarian government in the Earth Kingdom.

==== Avatar: Seven Havens (2026–present) ====
In celebration of the 20th anniversary of Avatar: The Last Airbender, Nickelodeon and Avatar Studios announced Avatar: Seven Havens, a new 2D animated series. Set 225 years after the events of The Legend of Korra, Avatar: Seven Havens takes place in the aftermath of a global cataclysmic event, with civilization on the verge of collapse. The series follows Korra's successors as the Avatar, Pavi and Nisha. Twin earthbenders who are blamed for humanity's destruction whilst attempting to survive. The series was created by Michael Dante DiMartino and Bryan Konietzko, and Ethan Spaulding and Sehaj Sethi serve as executive producers. Seven Havens consists of 26 half-hour episodes spread across two seasons, or books. On December 23, 2025, it was announced the series would be released on Paramount+. On July 23, 2026, it was announced at San Diego Comic-Con that the series would premiere on October 9. Seven Havens is set to conclude after its fourth season.

==== Avatar Kuruk: Wave of Chaos ====
On October 9, 2026, alongside the announcement of Seven Havens being renewed for additional seasons, a new animated series was given a production order for Paramount+. Described as an action comedy, it is a prequel set before Aang's story about a 14 year old Kuruk during a time of peace. Co-creator Bryan Konietzko will be showrunning the series.

=== Live-action series ===
==== Avatar: The Last Airbender (2024–present) ====
Produced by Netflix in partnership with Nickelodeon, Avatar: The Last Airbender is a live-action adaptation of the first series by Albert Kim. Michael Dante DiMartino and Bryan Konietzko, originally set to be the showrunners, abandoned the project due to creative differences. The first season was released on February 22, 2024, on Netflix, and consists of eight episodes. On March 6, 2024, the series was renewed for a second and third season, which it is set to conclude with.

== Films ==
Avatar: The Last Airbender films
Film	U.S. release date	Directed by	Screenplay by	Produced by
Live-action film
The Last Airbender	July 1, 2010	M. Night Shyamalan	M. Night Shyamalan	M. Night Shyamalan, Sam Mercer and Frank Marshall
Animated film
Avatar Aang: The Last Airbender	July 25, 2026	Lauren Montgomery	Tim Hedrick and Christopher Yost	Maryann Garger, Latifa Ouaou, Bryan Konietzko and Michael Dante DiMartino

=== Live-action films ===
==== The Last Airbender (2010) ====
The Last Airbender is a 2010 live-action adaptation of the first season of the animated series Avatar: The Last Airbender by M. Night Shyamalan. The film was widely panned by critics and fans of the animated series, and has since been considered one of the worst films ever made and took in $319 million at the worldwide box office.

=== Animated films ===
==== Avatar Aang: The Last Airbender (2026) ====
In February 2021, along with the announcement of the formation of Avatar Studios, it was reported that the studio's first project would be an animated theatrical film that would begin production later in 2021. In June 2022, it was announced that Lauren Montgomery, a former storyboard artist on Avatar and a supervising producer for Korra, would serve as director. In April 2024, Paramount revealed the film's tentative title, Aang: The Last Airbender, along with the casting of Eric Nam as Aang, Dionne Quan as Toph, Jessica Matten as Katara, Román Zaragoza as Sokka, and Dave Bautista as an antagonist. The film was originally set to be released theatrically on October 9, 2026 by Paramount Pictures. In April 2025, the title of the film was announced as The Legend of Aang: The Last Airbender. On December 23, 2025, it was announced the film would instead be released on Paramount+. In March 2026, Montgomery revealed that production had wrapped and the final cut of the film had been screened for the entire cast and crew. Posts from the screening by Eric Nam and Román Zaragoza revealed that the film had been retitled Avatar Aang: The Last Airbender. In April 2026, the entire film was leaked on social media platform X. Investigations were underway by Paramount Pictures to determine the source of the leak. Sources familiar with the situation say the company determined it did not originate internally. Avatar Aang: The Last Airbender was released on Paramount+ on July 25, 2026, with a limited theatrical release in Los Angeles and New York City.. The film received generally positive reviews from critics, fans, and audiences.

== Critical and public response ==
Critical response of Avatar: The Last Airbender films
Title	Rotten Tomatoes	Metacritic	CinemaScore
The Last Airbender	5% (193 reviews)	20 (33 reviews)	C
Avatar Aang: The Last Airbender	90% (48 reviews)	68 (11 reviews)	

Critical response of Avatar: The Last Airbender television series
Title	Season	Rotten Tomatoes	Metacritic
Avatar: The Last Airbender (2005–2008)	1	100% (12 reviews)	—N/a
Avatar: The Last Airbender (2005–2008)	2	100% (7 reviews)	—N/a
Avatar: The Last Airbender (2005–2008)	3	100% (7 reviews)	—N/a
The Legend of Korra	1	91% (11 reviews)	—N/a
The Legend of Korra	2	64% (11 reviews)	—N/a
The Legend of Korra	3	100% (10 reviews)	—N/a
The Legend of Korra	4	100% (13 reviews)	—N/a
Avatar: The Last Airbender (2024–present)	1	62% (86 reviews)	55 (27 reviews)
Avatar: The Last Airbender (2024–present)	2	68% (22 reviews)	68 (7 reviews)
Avatar: Seven Havens	1	100% (21 reviews)	80 (11 reviews)

== Comics ==
=== Avatar: The Last Airbender (2006–present) ===
Title	Release date(s)	Media type	Ref.
Avatar: The Last Airbender	January 25, 2006 – August 6, 2008	Film comic series	
Published by Tokyopop; Eight-part film comic of the animated series Avatar: The Last Airbender; Republished by Del Rey Books in 2010
Free Comic Book Day issues	May 7, 2011 – August 25, 2021	Mini-comic	
Written by Johane Matte and Gene Luen Yang, Nadia Shamas; Art by Johane Matte, Ryan Hill, Faith Erin Hicks, Carla Speed McNeil, and Sara Alfageeh; Published by Dark Horse Comics for Free Comic Book Day; Five original stories: "Relics" (May 7, 2011), "Rebound" (May 4, 2013), "Shells" (May 3, 2014), "Sisters" (May 2, 2015), "Matcha Makers" (August 25, 2021)
Avatar: The Last Airbender – The Lost Adventures	June 15, 2011	Anthology	
Written by Aaron Ehasz, Josh Hamilton, Tim Hedrick, Dave Roman, J. Torres and Alison Wilgus; Art by Joaquim Dos Santos, Elsa Garagarza, Gurihiru, Corey Lewis, Johane Matte, Ethan Spaulding, and others; Published by Dark Horse Comics (ISBN 978-1-59582-748-7); Collection of comics previously published in Nickelodeon Magazine and the Avatar: The Last Airbender DVDs
Avatar: The Last Airbender – The Promise	January 25 – September 26, 2012	Graphic novel trilogy	
Written by Gene Luen Yang, with art by Gurihiru; Published by Dark Horse Comics on January 25, 2012 (ISBN 978-1-59582-811-8), May 30, 2012 (ISBN 978-1-59582-875-0), September 26, 2012 (ISBN 978-1-59582-941-2); Collected in a library edition, released on February 20, 2013 (ISBN 978-1-61655-074-5); Sequel to the animated series Avatar: The Last Airbender; Dark Horse Comics' best-selling graphic novel of 2012
Avatar: The Last Airbender – The Search	March 20 – October 30, 2013	Graphic novel trilogy	
Written by Gene Luen Yang, with art by Gurihiru; Published by Dark Horse Comics on March 20, 2013 (ISBN 978-1-61655-054-7), July 10, 2013 (ISBN 978-1-61655-190-2), October 30, 2013 (ISBN 978-1-61655-184-1); Collected in a library edition, released on February 5, 2014 (ISBN 978-1-61655-226-8); Sequel to Avatar: The Last Airbender – The Promise; Dark Horse Comics' best-selling graphic novel of 2013
Avatar: The Last Airbender – The Rift	March 5 – November 18, 2014	Graphic novel trilogy	
Written by Gene Luen Yang, with art by Gurihiru; Published by Dark Horse Comics on March 5, 2014 (ISBN 978-1-61655-295-4), July 2, 2014 (ISBN 978-1-61655-296-1), November 5, 2014 (ISBN 978-1-61655-297-8); Collected in a library edition, released on February 11, 2015 (ISBN 978-1-61655-550-4); Sequel to Avatar: The Last Airbender – The Search; Dark Horse Comics' best-selling graphic novel of 2014
Avatar: The Last Airbender – Smoke and Shadow	October 6, 2015 – March 16, 2016	Graphic novel trilogy	
Written by Gene Luen Yang, with art by Gurihiru; Published by Dark Horse Comics on September 23, 2015 (ISBN 978-1-61655-761-4), December 16, 2015 (ISBN 978-1-61655-790-4), March 16, 2016 (ISBN 978-1-61655-838-3); Collected in a library edition, released on September 21, 2016 (ISBN 978-1-5067-0013-7); Sequel to Avatar: The Last Airbender – The Rift; Dark Horse Comics' best-selling graphic novel of 2015
Avatar: The Last Airbender – North and South	September 14, 2016 – April 26, 2017	Graphic novel trilogy	
Written by Gene Luen Yang, with art by Gurihiru; Published by Dark Horse Comics on September 14, 2016 (ISBN 978-1-5067-0022-9), January 25, 2017 (ISBN 978-1-5067-0129-5), April 26, 2017 (ISBN 978-1-5067-0130-1); Collected in a library edition, released on October 25, 2017 (ISBN 978-1-5067-0195-0); Sequel to Avatar: The Last Airbender – Smoke and Shadow
Avatar: The Last Airbender – Imbalance	December 18, 2018 – October 1, 2019	Graphic novel trilogy	
Written by Faith Erin Hicks, with art by Peter Wartman; First volume published by Dark Horse Comics on December 18, 2018 (ISBN 978-1-5067-0489-0); Second and third volume planned for publication on April 16, 2019 (ISBN 978-1-5067-0652-8), TBA; Sequel to Avatar: The Last Airbender – North and South
Avatar: The Last Airbender – Team Avatar Tales	October 15, 2019	Anthology	
Written by Gene Luen Yang, Dave Scheidt, Sara Goetter, Ron Koertge, and Kiku Hughes; Art by Gene Luen Yang, Faith Erin Hicks, Sara Goetter, Ryan Hill, Carla Speed McNeil, Johane Matte, and Sara DuVall; Published by Dark Horse Comics on March 6, 2019 (ISBN 978-1-5067-0793-8); Collection of the Free Comic Book Day issues and original short stories
Avatar: The Last Airbender – Katara and the Pirate's Silver	October 14, 2020	Graphic novel	
Written by Faith Erin Hicks; Art by Peter Wartman; Published by Dark Horse Comics on October 14, 2020 (ISBN 978-1-5067-1711-1); Original story which takes place in book 2 of Avatar: The Last Airbender
Avatar: The Last Airbender – Toph Beifong's Metalbending Academy	February 17, 2021	Graphic novel	
Written by Faith Erin Hicks; Art by Peter Wartman; Published by Dark Horse Comics on February 17, 2021 (ISBN 978-1-5067-1712-8); Original story which takes place between Avatar: The Last Airbender – The Rift and Avatar: The Last Airbender – Smoke and Shadow
Avatar: The Last Airbender – Suki, Alone	July 28, 2021	Graphic novel	
Written by Faith Erin Hicks; Art by Peter Wartman; Published by Dark Horse Comics on July 28, 2021 (ISBN 978-1-5067-1713-5); Original story which takes place in book 2 and book 3 of Avatar: The Last Airbender
Avatar: The Last Airbender – Azula in the Spirit Temple	November 1, 2023	Graphic novel	
Written by Faith Erin Hicks; Art by Peter Wartman; Published by Dark Horse Comics on November 1, 2023 (ISBN 978-1-5067-3771-3); Original story which takes place after Avatar: The Last Airbender – Smoke and Shadow
Avatar: The Last Airbender – The Bounty Hunter and the Tea Brewer	August 21, 2024	Graphic novel	
Written by Faith Erin Hicks, Michael Dante DiMartino, Bryan Konietzko; Art by Peter Wartman; Published by Dark Horse Comics on August 21, 2024 (ISBN 978-1-5067-3772-0); Original story which takes place after Avatar: The Last Airbender
Avatar: The Last Airbender – Ashes of the Academy	March 25, 2025	Graphic novel	
Written by Faith Erin Hicks, Michael Dante DiMartino, Bryan Konietzko; Art by Peter Wartman; Published by Dark Horse Comics on March 25, 2025 (ISBN 978-1-5067-3773-7); Original story which takes place after Avatar: The Last Airbender – Smoke and Shadow

=== The Last Airbender (2010) ===
Title	Release date(s)	Media type	Ref.
The Last Airbender Prequel: Zuko's Story	May 18, 2010	Graphic novel	
Written by Dave Roman and Alison Wilgus, with art by Nina Matsumoto; Published by Del Rey Books (ISBN 978-0-345-51854-5); Manga-influenced prequel to the live-action film The Last Airbender
The Last Airbender	June 22, 2010	Graphic novel	
Written by Dave Roman and Alison Wilgus, with art by Joon Choi; Published by Del Rey Books (ISBN 978-0-345-51855-2); Manga-influenced adaptation of the live-action film The Last Airbender; The New York Times Manga bestseller

=== The Legend of Korra (2016–present) ===
Title	Release date(s)	Media type	Ref.
Free Comic Book Day issues	May 7, 2016 – May 7, 2022	Mini-comic	
Written by Michael Dante DiMartino, Kiku Hughes, and Meridith McClaren, with art by Heather Campbell, Jayd Aït-Kaci, Sam Beck, and Meredith McClaren; Published by Dark Horse Comics for Free Comic Book Day; Four original stories: "Friends for Life" (May 7, 2016), "Lost Pets" (May 5, 2018), "Clearing the Air" (August 25, 2021), "Beach Wars" (May 7, 2022)
The Legend of Korra: Turf Wars	July 26, 2017 – August 22, 2018	Graphic novel trilogy	
Written by Michael Dante DiMartino, with art by Irene Koh; Published by Dark Horse Comics on July 26, 2017 (ISBN 978-1-5067-0015-1), January 17, 2018 (ISBN 978-1-5067-0040-3), August 22, 2018 (ISBN 978-1-5067-0185-1); Collected in a library edition, released on March 13, 2019 (ISBN 978-1-5067-0202-5); Sequel to the animated series The Legend of Korra; Dark Horse Comics' best-selling graphic novels of 2017 and 2018
The Legend of Korra: Ruins of the Empire	May 21, 2019 – February 26, 2020	Graphic novel trilogy	
Written by Michael Dante DiMartino, with art by Michelle Wong; Published by Dark Horse Comics on May 21, 2019 (ISBN 978-1-5067-0894-2), November 22, 2019 (ISBN 978-1-5067-0895-9), February 26, 2020 (ISBN 978-1-5067-0896-6); Collected in a library edition, released on September 9, 2020 (ISBN 978-1-5067-0893-5); Sequel to The Legend of Korra: Turf Wars
The Legend of Korra: Patterns in Time	November 30, 2022	Anthology	
Written by Michael Dante DiMartino, Kiku Hughes, Rachel Silverstein, Blue Delliquanti, Victoria Ying, and Delilah Dawson; Art by Heather Campbell, Jayd Aït-Kaci, Sam Beck, Blue Delliquanti, Jen Xu, K. Rhodes, Victoria Ying, and Alexandria Monik; Published by Dark Horse Comics on November 30, 2022 (ISBN 978-1-5067-2186-6); Anthology of Free Comic Book Day issues and original short stories
The Legend of Korra: The Mystery of Penquan Island	March 4, 2025	Graphic novel	
Written by Kiku Hughes; Art by Alex Monik; Published by Dark Horse Comics on March 4, 2025 (ISBN 978-1-5067-4391-2); Original story which takes place after The Legend of Korra

== Books ==
=== Novels ===
Title	Release date	Age category	Media type	Ref.
The Earth Kingdom Chronicles	May 8, 2007 – April 8, 2008	Children	Novelization series	
Written by Michael Teitelbaum, with art by Patrick Spaziante; Published by Simon Spotlight and Nickelodeon; Six-part adaptation of Avatar: The Last Airbender season two, with each book told from a different character's perspective; The Tale of Aang, released on May 8, 2007 (ISBN 978-1-4169-3606-0); The Tale of Azula, released on June 26, 2007 (ISBN 978-1-4169-3608-4); The Tale of Toph, released on October 23, 2007 (ISBN 978-1-4169-3797-5); The Tale of Sokka, released on November 27, 2007 (ISBN 978-1-4169-3829-3); The Tale of Zuko, released on February 5, 2008 (ISBN 978-1-4169-4984-8); The Tale of Katara, released on April 8, 2008 (ISBN 978-1-4169-5062-2); First four books collected in Journeys Through the Earth Kingdom, released on April 6, 2010 (ISBN 978-1-4169-9446-6)
Ready-to-Read	July 1 – December 16, 2008	Children	Novelization series	
Written by Michael Teitelbaum, Sherry Gerstein, and Molly Reisner, with art by Patrick Spaziante; Published by Simon Spotlight and Nickelodeon; Two-part adaptation of events from Avatar: The Last Airbender season three and an original story; Sokka, the Sword Master, released on July 1, 2008 (ISBN 978-1-4169-5491-0); Aang's School Days, released on July 1, 2008 (ISBN 978-1-4169-5813-0); Love Potion #8, released on December 16, 2008 (ISBN 978-1-4169-6082-9)
Sozin's Comet: The Final Battle	May 20, 2008	Children	Novelization	
Written by David Bergantino, with art by Patrick Spaziante; Published by Simon Spotlight and Nickelodeon; Adaptation of Sozin's Comet (ISBN 978-1-4169-5827-7)
The Last Airbender Movie Novelization	May 25, 2010	Children	Novelization	
Written by Michael Teitelbaum; Published by Simon Spotlight and Nickelodeon; Adaptation of The Last Airbender (ISBN 978-1-4424-0174-7)
The Last Airbender Movie	May 25, 2010	Children	Novelization series	
Written by Emily Sollinger, Michael Teitelbaum, Brian James, and Irene Kilpatrick, with art by Shane L. Johnson; Published by Simon Spotlight and Nickelodeon; Four-part adaptation of The Last Airbender; Aang's Destiny (ISBN 978-1-4169-9938-6); Trial by Fire (ISBN 978-1-4424-0290-4); Battle of the North (ISBN 978-1-4169-6085-0); The Avatar's Return (ISBN 978-1-4169-9939-3)
Nickelodeon: Legend of Korra	January 8 – July 9, 2013	Young adult	Novelization series	
Written by Erica David; Published by Random House; Two-part adaptation of The Legend of Korra season one; Revolution, released on January 8, 2013 (ISBN 978-0-449-81554-0); Endgame, released on July 9, 2013 (ISBN 978-0-449-81734-6)
The Kyoshi Novels	July 16, 2019 – July 21, 2020	Young adult	Novel series	
Written by F. C. Yee; Published by Amulet Books; Two-part original prequel story about Avatar Kyoshi, set four centuries before the events of the animated series Avatar: The Last Airbender; The Rise of Kyoshi, released on July 16, 2019 (ISBN 978-1-4197-3504-2); The Shadow of Kyoshi, released on July 21, 2020 (ISBN 978-1-4197-3505-9)
The Yangchen Novels	July 19, 2022 – July 18, 2023	Young adult	Novel series	
Written by F. C. Yee; Published by Amulet Books; Two-part original prequel story about Avatar Yangchen, set more than four centuries before the events of the animated series Avatar: The Last Airbender; The Dawn of Yangchen, released on July 19, 2022 (ISBN 978-1-4197-5677-1); The Legacy of Yangchen, released on July 18, 2023 (ISBN 978-1-4197-5679-5)
The Roku Novels	July 23, 2024 – December 30, 2025	Young adult	Novel series	
Written by Randy Ribay; Published by Amulet Books; Two-part original prequel story about Avatar Roku, set one century before the events of the animated series Avatar: The Last Airbender; The Reckoning of Roku, released on July 23, 2024 (ISBN 978-1-4197-7603-8); The Awakening of Roku, released on December 30, 2025 (ISBN 978-1-4197-8066-0)
Avatar Legends	July 22, 2025 – present	Young adult	Novel series	
Written by Judy I. Lin; Published by Amulet Books; Follows "unsung heroes" from the animated series Avatar: The Last Airbender and The Legend of Korra; Avatar Legends: City of Echoes, released on July 22, 2025 (ISBN 978-1-4197-7604-5)
Avatar Legends Bending Academy: Fire	November 18, 2025 – present	Children	Novel series	
Written by Ash J. Wu; Published by Random House Books for Young Readers; Illustrated chapter books with stories set in the Avatar Legends world; Light it Up, released on November 18, 2025 (ISBN 979-8-217-02589-3)

=== Art books ===
Title	Release date	ISBN	Media type	Ref.
How to Draw Avatar: The Last Airbender	March 28, 2007	978-1-56010-783-5	Drawing book	
Illustrated by Shane Johnson; Published by Walter Foster Publishing
Avatar: The Last Airbender Drawing Book and Kit	September 28, 2007	978-1-60058-060-4	Drawing book	
Illustrated by Shane Johnson; Published by Walter Foster Publishing
Avatar: The Last Airbender – The Art of the Animated Series	May 19, 2010	978-1-59582-504-9	Concept art	
Published by Dark Horse Comics; Concept, design, and production art from the development of Avatar: The Last Airbender, with commentary by Bryan Konietzko and Michael Dante DiMartino
The Legend of Korra Book One: Air – The Art of the Animated Series	July 17, 2013	978-1-61655-168-1	Concept art	
Published by Dark Horse Comics; Concept, design, and production art from the development of The Legend of Korra season one, with commentary by Bryan Konietzko and Michael Dante DiMartino
How to Draw The Legend of Korra	August 15, 2014	978-1-60058-379-7	Drawing book	
Published by Walter Foster Publishing
The Legend of Korra Book Two: Spirits – The Art of the Animated Series	September 3, 2014	978-1-61655-462-0	Concept art	
Published by Dark Horse Comics; Concept, design, and production art from the development of The Legend of Korra season two, with commentary by Bryan Konietzko, Michael Dante DiMartino, and Joaquim Dos Santos
The Legend of Korra Book Three: Change – The Art of the Animated Series	January 21, 2015	978-1-61655-565-8	Concept art	
Published by Dark Horse Comics; Concept, design, and production art from the development of The Legend of Korra season three, with commentary by Bryan Konietzko, Michael Dante DiMartino, and Joaquim Dos Santos
Avatar: The Last Airbender – The Poster Collection	August 12, 2015	978-1-61655-737-9	Posters	
Published by Dark Horse Comics; Collection of Avatar: The Last Airbender posters by various artists
The Legend of Korra Book Four: Balance – The Art of the Animated Series	September 2, 2015	978-1-61655-687-7	Concept art	
Published by Dark Horse Comics; Concept, design, and production art from the development of The Legend of Korra season four, with commentary by Bryan Konietzko, Michael Dante DiMartino, and Joaquim Dos Santos
The Legend of Korra – The Poster Collection	September 28, 2016	978-1-5067-0119-6	Posters	
Published by Dark Horse Comics; Collection of The Legend of Korra posters by various artists
Avatar: The Last Airbender Coloring Book	October 5, 2016	978-1-5067-0236-0	Adult coloring book	
Art by Jed Henry; Published by Dark Horse Comics
The Legend of Korra Coloring Book	July 12, 2017	978-1-5067-0246-9	Adult coloring book	
Art by Jed Henry; Published by Dark Horse Comics
Beasts of the Four Nations: Creatures from Avatar: The Last Airbender and The Legend of Korra	September 23, 2025	978-1-5067-4720-0	Concept art	
Published by Dark Horse Comics; Art on animals depicted in Avatar: The Last Airbender and The Legend of Korra by various artists

=== Others ===
Title	Release date	ISBN	Media type	Ref.
The Lost Scrolls	December 26, 2006 – January 23, 2007	Various	Companion book series	
Written by Michael Teitelbaum, Tom Mason, and Dan Danko; Art by Patrick Spaziante and Shane L. Johnson; Published by Simon Spotlight and Nickelodeon; Four-part series with each book compiling information on one of the four in-universe nations; The Lost Scrolls: Water, released on December 26, 2006 (ISBN 978-1-4169-1878-3); The Lost Scrolls: Fire, released on December 26, 2006 (ISBN 978-1-4169-1880-6); The Lost Scrolls: Earth, released on January 23, 2007 (ISBN 978-1-4169-1877-6); The Lost Scrolls: Air, released on January 23, 2007 (ISBN 978-1-4169-1879-0); Collected in The Lost Scrolls Collection, released on June 23, 2009 (ISBN 978-1-4169-7822-0)
The Ultimate Pocket Guide	July 24, 2007	978-1-4169-4736-3	Companion book	
Written by Tom Mason and Dan Danko; Published by Simon Spotlight and Nickelodeon; Collection of Avatar: The Last Airbender facts and trivia
Battle of the Benders	January 8, 2008	978-0-375-84331-0	3D book	
Published by Random House Children's Books; Children's book with 3D pictures and activities
Brainbenders from the Four Nations	January 8, 2008	978-1-4169-5350-0	Quiz book	
Written by Sherry Gerstein; Published by Simon Spotlight and Nickelodeon; Children's quiz book based on Avatar: The Last Airbender seasons one and two
Mindbenders and Brainbusters: The Ultimate Avatar Challenge	September 9, 2008	978-1-4169-6057-7	Quiz book	
Written by Michael Teitelbaum; Published by Simon Spotlight and Nickelodeon; Children's quiz book based on Avatar: The Last Airbender season three
The Legend of Korra: Enhanced Experience	July 2, 2013	978-1-61263-394-7	E-book	
Published by Nickelodeon on iTunes; Supplemental material for The Legend of Korra seasons one and two
Avatar: The Last Airbender: Legacy	October 13, 2015	978-1-60887-447-7	Illustrated fiction	
Written by Michael Teitelbaum; Published by Insight Editions; Presented as an in-universe scrapbook made by Aang for his son Tenzin
The Legend of Korra: An Avatar's Chronicle	August 6, 2019	978-1-68383-393-2	Illustrated fiction	
Written by Andrea Robinson, with art by Sora Medina; Published by Insight Editions; Presented as an in-universe scrapbook made by characters from The Legend of Korra
Avatar: The Last Airbender: Legacy of The Fire Nation	February 4, 2020	978-1-68383-392-5	Illustrated fiction	
Written by Joshua Pruett; Published by Insight Editions; Presented as an in-universe scrapbook made by Iroh for his nephew Zuko

== Video games ==
Game	Details
Avatar: The Last Airbender Original release date(s): NA: October 10, 2006; EU: December 31, 2006; AU: December 31, 2007	Release years by system: 2006 – Game Boy Advance, Windows, GameCube, Nintendo DS, PlayStation 2, PlayStation Portable, Wii, Xbox
Avatar: The Last Airbender Original release date(s): NA: October 10, 2006; EU: December 31, 2006; AU: December 31, 2007	Notes: Developed by THQ Studio Australia, Tose (Nintendo DS and PlayStation Portable) and Halfbrick Studios (Game Boy Advance), published by THQ; Released in the United Kingdom and Australia under the title Avatar: The Legend of Aang
Avatar: The Last Airbender – The Burning Earth Original release date(s): NA: October 16, 2007; AU: October 25, 2007; EU: October 26, 2007	Release years by system: 2007 – Wii, Nintendo DS, Game Boy Advance, PlayStation 2, Xbox 360
Avatar: The Last Airbender – The Burning Earth Original release date(s): NA: October 16, 2007; AU: October 25, 2007; EU: October 26, 2007	Notes: Developed by THQ Studio Australia, Tose (Nintendo DS) and Halfbrick Studios (Game Boy Advance), published by THQ; Released in the United Kingdom and Australia under the title Avatar: The Legend of Aang – The Burning Earth
Avatar: The Last Airbender – Into the Inferno Original release date(s): NA: October 13, 2008; AU: October 30, 2008; EU: October 31, 2008	Release years by system: 2008 – Wii, Nintendo DS, PlayStation 2
Avatar: The Last Airbender – Into the Inferno Original release date(s): NA: October 13, 2008; AU: October 30, 2008; EU: October 31, 2008	Notes: Developed by THQ Studio Australia and Halfbrick Studios (Nintendo DS), published by THQ; Released in the United Kingdom and Australia under the title Avatar: The Legend of Aang – Into the Inferno
Avatar: Legends of the Arena Original release date: WW: September 19, 2008	Release years by system: 2008 – Windows, Mac OS X
Avatar: Legends of the Arena Original release date: WW: September 19, 2008	Notes: Developed and published by Nickelodeon; Massively multiplayer online role-playing game
The Last Airbender Original release date(s): NA: June 29, 2010; EU: August 6, 2010; AU: September 9, 2010	Release years by system: 2010 – Wii, Nintendo DS
The Last Airbender Original release date(s): NA: June 29, 2010; EU: August 6, 2010; AU: September 9, 2010	Notes: Developed by THQ Studio Australia and Halfbrick Studios (Nintendo DS), published by THQ
The Legend of Korra Original release date(s): NA: October 21, 2014	Release years by system: 2014 – Windows, PlayStation 3, PlayStation 4, Xbox 360, Xbox One
The Legend of Korra Original release date(s): NA: October 21, 2014	Notes: Developed by PlatinumGames and published by Activision
The Legend of Korra: A New Era Begins Original release date(s): NA: October 28, 2014	Release years by system: 2014 – Nintendo 3DS
The Legend of Korra: A New Era Begins Original release date(s): NA: October 28, 2014	Notes: Developed by Webfoot Technologies and published by Activision; Turn-based strategy game
Avatar: The Last Airbender – Quest for Balance Original release date(s): WW: September 22, 2023	Release years by system: 2023 – Nintendo Switch, PlayStation 4, PlayStation 5, Windows, Xbox One, Xbox Series X/S
Avatar: The Last Airbender – Quest for Balance Original release date(s): WW: September 22, 2023	Notes: Developed by Bamtang Games and published by GameMill Entertainment; Action-adventure game
Avatar Generations Original release date: WW: January 31, 2023	Release years by system: 2023 – iOS, Android
Avatar Generations Original release date: WW: January 31, 2023	Notes: Developed by Navigation Games and published by CDE Entertainment; Turn-based strategy role-playing mobile game
Avatar Legends: The Fighting Game Original release dates: WW: July 2, 2026 (Early access); WW: July 23, 2026 (Full access)	Release years by system: 2026 – Windows, PlayStation 5, Nintendo Switch, Nintendo Switch 2, Xbox Series X/S
Avatar Legends: The Fighting Game Original release dates: WW: July 2, 2026 (Early access); WW: July 23, 2026 (Full access)	Notes: 2D fighting game developed by Gameplay Group International, published by PM Studios and Paramount Games Studio

== Music ==
=== Albums ===
Game	Details
The Last Airbender June 29, 2010 – Compact disc, digital	Notes: Soundtrack to The Last Airbender; Composed by James Newton Howard; Released by Lakeshore Records; 12 tracks on a single disc with a duration of 1:06:46
The Legend of Korra: Original Music from Book One July 16, 2013 – Compact disc, digital	Notes: Soundtrack to Book One: Air; Composed by Jeremy Zuckerman; Released by Nickelodeon and Legacy Recordings; 26 instrumental tracks on a single disc with a duration of 1:04:38
Avatar: The Last Airbender – Book 1: Water (Music From The Animated Series) November 17, 2023 – Digital, vinyl September 7, 2024 – Compact disc	Notes: Soundtrack to Book One: Water; Composed by Jeremy Zuckerman; Released by Paramount Global and Kids / Republic Records; 35 tracks with a duration of 1:22:08
Avatar: The Last Airbender – Season 1 (Soundtrack from the Netflix Series) February 22, 2024 – Digital, vinyl	Notes: Soundtrack to Season 1: Water; Composed by Takeshi Furukawa; Released by Netflix Music; 28 tracks with a duration of 1:16:46
Avatar: The Last Airbender – Book 2: Earth (Music From The Animated Series) July 25, 2025 – Digital, vinyl	Notes: Soundtrack to Book Two: Earth; Composed by Jeremy Zuckerman; Released by Paramount Global and Kids / Republic Records; 24 tracks with a duration of 1:16:12
Avatar: The Last Airbender – Season 2 (Soundtrack from the Netflix Series) June 25, 2026 – Digital, vinyl	Notes: Soundtrack to Season 2: Earth; Composed by Takeshi Furukawa; Released by Netflix Music; 26 tracks with a duration of 1:17:46
Avatar: The Last Airbender – Book 3: Fire (Music From The Animated Series) July 17, 2026 – Digital, vinyl	Notes: Soundtrack to Book Three: Fire; Composed by Jeremy Zuckerman; Released by Paramount Global and Kids / Republic Records; 38 tracks with a duration of 1:52:16
Avatar Aang: The Last Airbender (Music From The Motion Picture) July 24, 2026 – Digital December 11, 2026 – vinyl	Notes: Soundtrack to Avatar Aang: The Last Airbender; Composed by Jeremy Zuckerman; Released by Milan Records; 36 tracks with a duration of 1:27:39
Avatar: Seven Havens – Book 1: Survival (Music From The Animated Series) October 30, 2026 – Digital	Notes: Soundtrack to Book One: Survival; Composed by Jeremy Zuckerman; Released by Paramount Global and Kids / Republic Records; 38 tracks with a duration of 1:03:18

=== Singles ===
Game	Details
Aang Becomes Ocean July 28, 2023 – Digital	Notes: Track from the soundtrack to Book One: Water; Composed by Jeremy Zuckerman; Released by Paramount Global and Kids / Republic Records
Roku Destroys the Temple September 29, 2023 – Digital	Notes: Track from the soundtrack to Book One: Water; Composed by Jeremy Zuckerman; Released by Paramount Global and Kids / Republic Records
Secret Tunnel June 13, 2025 – Digital September 1, 2025 – 7-inch vinyl	Notes: Digital includes the track from the soundtrack to Book Two: Earth; Vinyl includes an additional live version of the same track, exclusively sold at the merchandise booth of the Avatar: The Last Airbender in Concert – The 20th Anniversary Tour (2025–2026); Composed by Jeremy Zuckerman; Released by Paramount Global and Kids / Republic Records

== Other media ==
=== Podcast ===
Avatar: Braving the Elements is a podcast by Nickelodeon in which Dante Basco, the voice actor for Prince Zuko, and Janet Varney, who voiced Korra, revisit the animated television series. The podcast's main focus are deep dives into each TV episode in chronological order; other episodes explore individual characters, important themes in the Avatar universe or the craft and artistic work which went into creating it. Varney and Basco are often joined by other people who were involved in bringing the series to life, including fellow voice actors, writers, directors, producers and the show creators themselves. Avatar: Braving the Elements has also featured fans of the show as guests and been live-recorded by its hosts at conventions. Beginning with season 3, video recordings of the podcast were uploaded to Youtube.

=== Tabletop roleplaying game ===
On July 12, 2021, Magpie Games announced that on August 3 of the same year they'd be launching a Kickstarter campaign for Avatar Legends: The Roleplaying Game, an officially licensed tabletop roleplaying game set in the universe of Avatar: The Last Airbender and The Legend of Korra. The campaign raised USD $9.53M, becoming the most successful campaign for a tabletop game in Kickstarter's history. Pre-orders for much of the game's content opened on October 12, 2022.

=== Concert ===
In October 2023, Nickelodeon and GEA Live announced Avatar: The Last Airbender in Concert, an ongoing concert tour featuring Zuckerman's score for the series. The tour was initially announced for four dates and locations in the UK, US, and France, and premiered in London on January 21, 2024. The concert runs for over two hours and the music is performed by an orchestral ensemble, while several moments from the series are displayed on a large screen. Zuckerman, in assistance with DiMartino, Konietzko, and original editor Jeff Adams expanded the series' score and compositions for the concert. The concert is produced by Nickelodeon, GEA Live, and Senbla.

=== Trading Card Game ===
On October 28th, 2025, Wizards of the Coast announced their newest Magic the Gathering crossover to be with Avatar: The Last Airbender. The series was released on November 21st, 2025, with a set of 414 cards; an additional eternal release releasing soon after while providing more artwork and some rereleases of cards. On November 17th, 2025 a secret lair, a handful of cards, was also released.
