= Avatar: The Last Airbender in Concert =

2024 concert tour by Jeremy Zuckerman

- Concert by Jeremy Zuckerman
- Original run promotional poster
- Location: North America; Europe; Malaysia; Australia; New Zealand; Singapore
- Associated albums: Avatar: The Last Airbender – Book 1: Water (Music from the Animated Series)
- Start date: January 21, 2024
- Website: www.avatarinconcert.com

Avatar: The Last Airbender in Concert is an ongoing concert tour featuring Jeremy Zuckerman's musical score for the animated television series Avatar: The Last Airbender (2005–2008), performed by an orchestral ensemble. The concert is produced by Nickelodeon, GEA Live, and Senbla.

== Background ==
In July 2023, Nickelodeon and Republic Records announced the release of the first season soundtrack for Avatar: The Last Airbender (2005–2008), which includes an expanded score by series composer Jeremy Zuckerman. In October 2023, Nickelodeon and GEA Live announced Avatar: The Last Airbender in Concert, an ongoing concert tour that showcases Zuckerman's expanded score. The tour was initially announced with four dates across the United States, United Kingdom, and France. Avatar: The Last Airbender in Concert premiered in London on January 21, 2024, with series creators Michael Dante DiMartino and Bryan Konietzko in attendance.

Later in January 2024, Nickelodeon announced that the concert would expand into a 100-city world tour, covering North America, Europe, and the Asia-Pacific beginning in September 2024. In April 2025, it was announced that a special edition of the concert to coincide with the original series' twentieth anniversary would debut in September 2025. Subtitled The 20th Anniversary Tour, it features new elements absent from the original run and will arrive in over 80 cities worldwide.

== Show synopsis ==
The concert runs for approximately two hours, featuring a live orchestral ensemble performing music as selected footage from the series is shown on a large screen. Composer Jeremy Zuckerman, worked with Michael Dante DiMartino, Bryan Konietzko, and original editor Jeff Adams to expand the series' score and compositions for the concert. In addition to standard Western orchestral instruments, the production incorporates taiko drums and the erhu to reflect the series’ Asian-inspired musical elements, along with lighting effects synchronized to specific on-screen moments.

== Reception ==
Joanna Magill of Radio Times gave the concert a 4 out 5 star rating. Although she criticized some audio mixing issues, Magill referred to it as a "flawless production". Jack Periccos of Music-News.com gave it a 5 out of 5 star rating, describing the concert as a "mesmerising symphony of nostalgia and a testament to the enduring impact of this beloved series". Kieran Hurwood of The Beaver rated the concert a 4.5 out of 5, praising the integrated visuals and lighting for enhancing the concert experience, but criticizing the non-chronological presentation of events from the series. Alexandra Ramos of CinemaBlend praised the concert, remarking that she had a newfound appreciation for the series' music and themes after it finished. Zachary Miller of Front Row Reviewers commended the orchestra's performance for "bringing the magic of the story to the audience in real time".
