= Varijashree Venugopal =

Indian singer and flautist

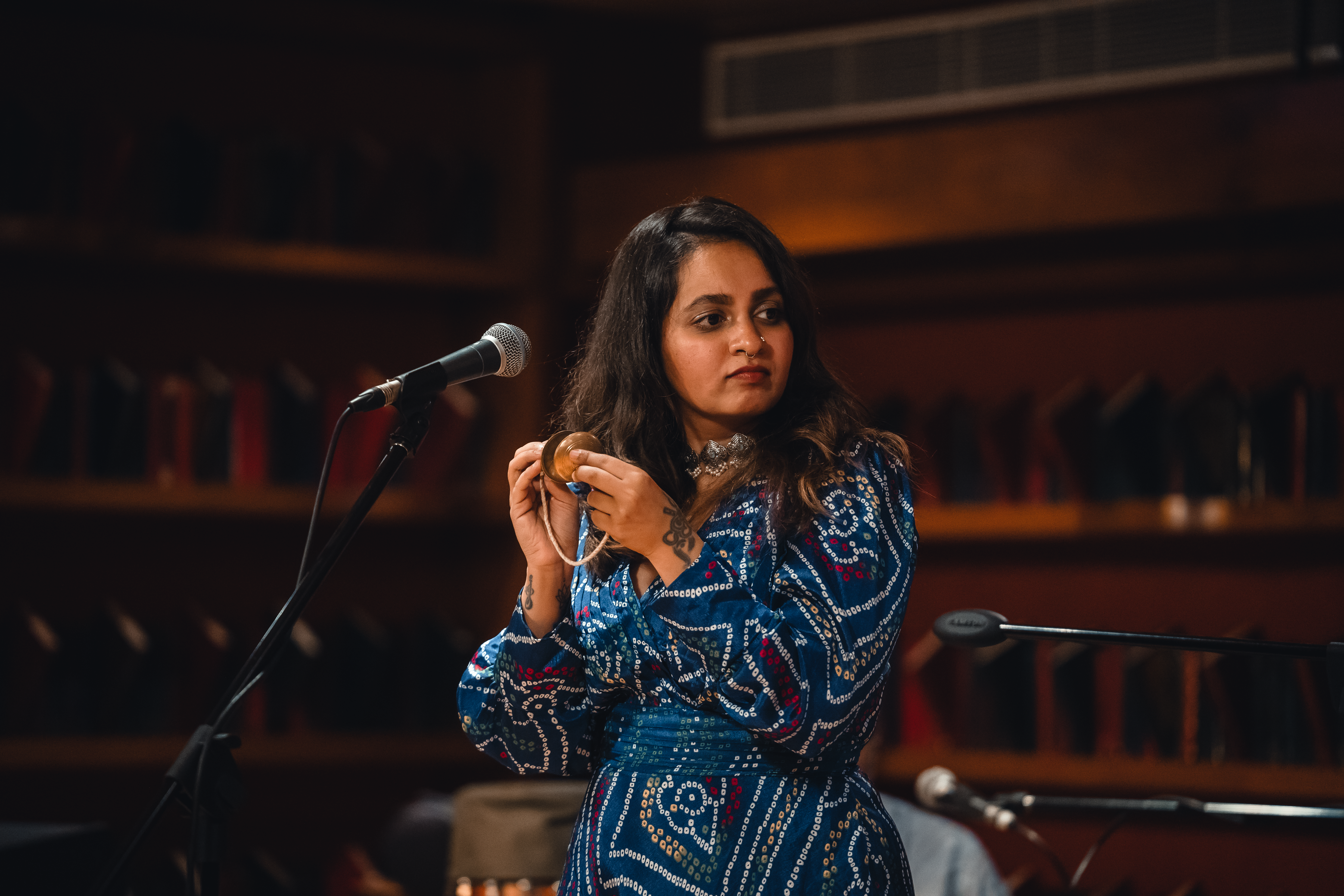

Background information
- Born: Varijashree Venugopal; 6 March 1991 (age 35); Mysore, India
- Occupations: Singer, flautist
- Years active: 1995–present
- Spouse: Raghu Dixit (married 2025–present)

Varijashree Venugopal, born in Bangalore, India on 6 March 1991, is a Grammy nominated Indian singer and flautist. In 2024 she received her first Grammy nomination along with Jacob Collier and Anoushka Shankar for the work A Rock Somehere. She works as an independent artist featuring with bands such as Charkafonics, EYM Trio, Snarky Puppy and is the creator of the art form "Carnatic Scat Singing" which is a blend of carnatic music and Jazz.

== Early life ==
Varijashree was born to an Indian Brahmin family of HS Venugopal and TV Rama both accomplished musicians. She was found to have the rare ability to identify about 40 ragas at the age of one and a half and about 200 ragas at the age of 4. She was initially trained by her father and then started undergoing formal training in Carnatic music under Vidhushi H. Geetha at the age of 4. She later underwent learnt rare compositions classes an essential for Vidwath ( Senior level performance artistry training ) from Vidhushi Vasantha Srinivasan and Vidwan D.S. Srivatsa.

Her music has been vastly shaped by her guru Gaanakalanidhi Vidwan Salem P. Sundaresan. She is also a trained and accomplished flutist with her father Vid. H. S. Venugopal being her guru from the past twelve years. Her first format concert was conducted at the Bangalore Gayana Samaja at the age of seven.

Varijashree is part of the Bangalore band "Chakrafonics" along with musicians Praveen D Rao, Ajay Warrier and Pramath Kiran. Chakrafonics is famous for its unique blend of traditional classical music with other genres of music.

Her works also include singing and composing for Kannada soaps and is popularly known for rendering her voice for Helvanakatte Giriyamma and Magalu Janaki for which she has received widespread public acclaim.

== Music Training ==
Guru	Genre	Time period	Description
HS Venugopal and Rama Venugopal	Carnatic	1992–present	Started her initial lessons as a toddler.
Vidushi H Geeta	Carnatic	1998–2005	Foundations in carnatic music.
Sri. Vid. Sundareshan	Carnatic	2005–2011	Furtherment in music and training.
Vidhushi Vasantha Srinivasan and Vidwan D.S. Srivatsa	Carnatic	2008	Rare compositions of Saints.

== Experiments with World Music ==
In 2018, Varijashree started to explore world music and Jazz in particular owing to a childhood inclination and started posting a unique blend of her thought process which added layers of carnatic music into Jazz for which she coined the term "Carnatic Scat" singing. She used the online medium to reach out to audiences and artists alike. To her surprise found people such as Bobby McFerrin reaching out to her trying to understand the new progress in the field. It was then that her collaborations started with bands such as EYM Trio, Snarky Puppy as well as several independent artists such as Hamilton Hollanda started.

== Kalaarnava Music Festival ==
Varijashree along with her father H.S Venugopal and her mother are the running directors of the Bengaluru Based Art Festival Kalaarnava ( meaning the blooming of art forms ) which has been an avenue for performing artists of all kinds from across the globe. The festival has been running since the year 2005. The festival has featured artists all across the country including Hariharan (singer) and S. P. Balasubrahmanyam who were awardees of the festival's event presentation Kalavatamsa.

== Awards ==
- In 2024 she received her first Grammy Nomination in the Best Global Music Performance category for "A Rock Somewhere," by Jacob Collier

She has also received several awards which include recognition from the state and central governments of India.

== Albums ==
Varijashree has music albums ‘Arpana’ and ‘Upasana’, and the recently released ‘Mela raga malika’, ‘Bidiru’ and ‘Kaayo enna gopala’ to her credit. She has scored music for the documentary films like ‘Ashtaavadhaana’ directed by Vid. Shataavadhani Dr.R.Ganesh, short films 'Chiguru' and 'Little Treasures' directed by Sri Karthik and Sri Vivek Aaraga.

She is featured in several tracks on "Sensurround", the third album of the Italian group "Trio Bobo", a side of the Italian progressive group Elio e le storie tese.

She has also created an independent album 'Vari' in collaboration with Grammy awarded artist Michael League along with the team including Hamilton Hollanda, Rajesh Vaidhya, Pramath Kiran, Praveen D Rao.

The album features 7 tracks with each bringing a unique dimensional flavor which expresses the Indian way of thought and its universalness which enables a smooth blend of multiple art forms.

== Performing Bands ==
Band Name	Language	Co-artists	Genre
Chakraphonics	Multi lingual	Pramath Kiran, Praveen D Rao, Ajay Warrier	Carnatic Fusion
EYM Trio	Multi Lingual	Elie Dufour, Yann Phayphet, Marc Michel	Jazz
Collaboration with Micheal League	Multi Lingual	Rajesh Vaidya, Micheal League, Pramath Kiran and others	Multi Genre
Collaboration with Trio HLK	Carnatic Scat	Rich Harrold	Rich Harrold, Ant Law, Rich Kass

== Filmography ==
Songs in Commercial Films as lead.
Song name	Movie	Language	Co-artists	Music direction
Darling Darling	Darling	Kannada	Anoop Seelin	Anoop Seelin
Madhura Madhura	Kadala Theerada Bhargava	Kannada	Anil CJ	Anil CJ
Neene Nanna Alapane	Kadala Theerada Bhargava	Kannada	Solo	Anil C J
Yaare Neenu Chathure	Tagaru	Kannada	Solo	Charan Raj
Paayum Theeye	Por	Tamil	Sanjith Hegde	Sanjith Hegde
Naa Pranam	Mehbooba	Telugu	Solo	Sandeep Chowta
Saptaswara	Aachaar and Co	Kannada	Solo	Bindumalini

Featured in American Films as a guest artist
Year	Movie	Language	Composer	Notes	Source
2026	Avatar Aang: The Last Airbender	English	Jeremy Zuckerman		

=== Songs Varijashree Featured from Avatar Aang: The Last Airbender ===
- Sonam’s Staff - The Great Sphere
- Lion Turtle Islands
- Sonam's Song - with Celia Liu

Featured in Amercian TV shows
Year	Title	Role	Notes	Source
2026	Avatar: Seven Havens	Guest Vocalist	Co-Composer	

=== Songs Varijashree Featured from Avatar: Seven Havens ===
- Avatar: Seven Havens Main Title/Main Theme (composer version)
- Really Your Fault
- The Cosmic Plane
- The Anomaly
- The Second Chakra
