= Michael Dante DiMartino =

American animation director (born 1974)

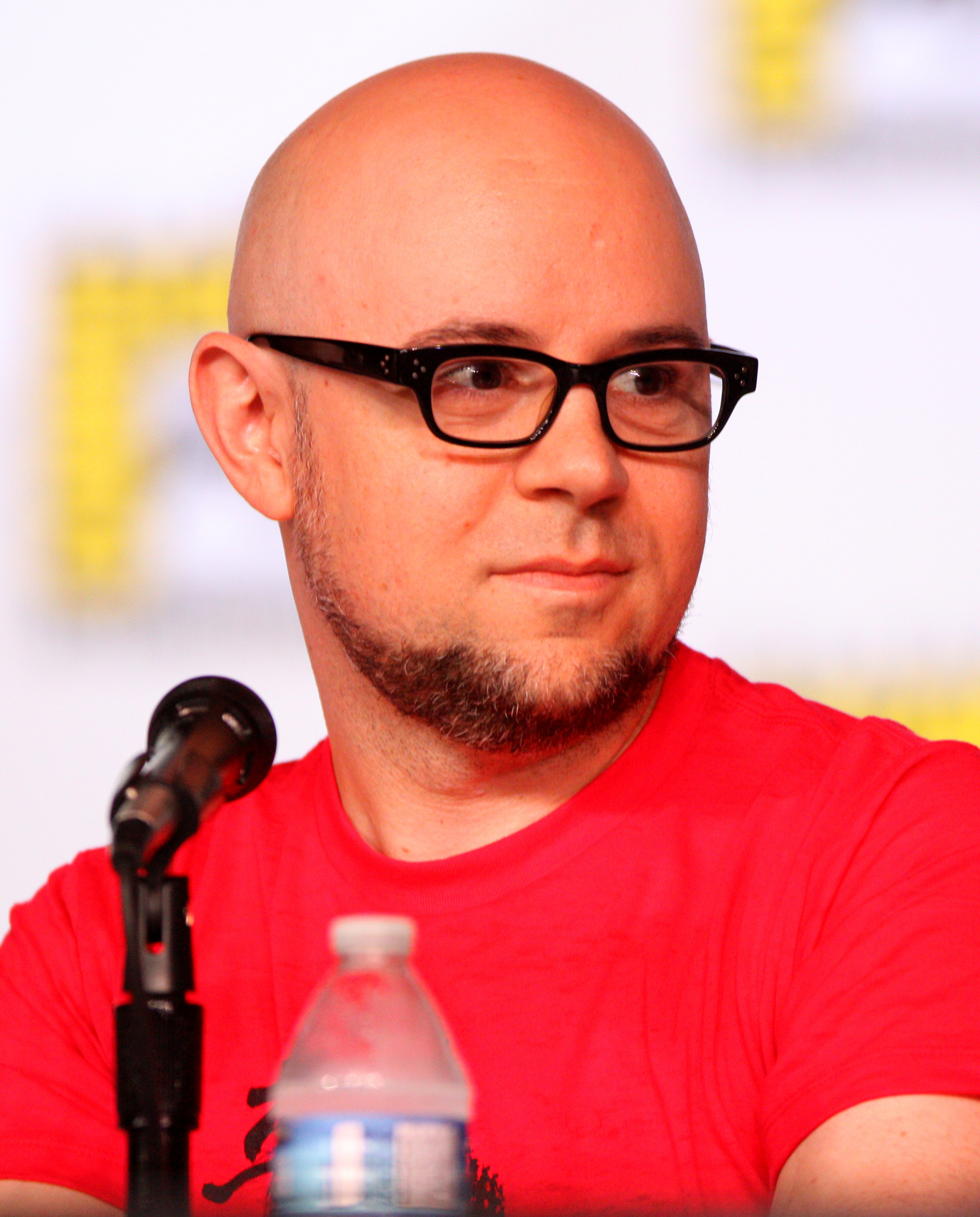
- DiMartino at the 2012 San Diego Comic-Con
- Born: Shelburne, Vermont, U.S.
- Education: Rhode Island School of Design (BFA)
- Occupations: Animator, producer, writer, director
- Years active: 1993–present
- Known for: Co-creator of Avatar Legends
- Title: Co-Chief Creative Officer, Avatar Studios
- Spouse: Shoshana Stolove (m. 2014)
- Children: 2

Michael Dante DiMartino is an American animator, producer, writer, and director. He is best known, together with Bryan Konietzko, as the co-creator of the Avatar Legends franchise.

== Career ==
Before Avatar, DiMartino worked for twelve years at Film Roman, helping to direct King of the Hill, Family Guy and Mission Hill, in addition to his own animated short, Atomic Love, which was screened at a number of high-profile film festivals. The dedication to his father's memory can be seen in the penultimate episode of Avatar: The Last Airbender.

In 2007, DiMartino and Konietzko became interested in developing a live action film adaptation of Avatar: The Last Airbender, choosing to develop the film over a fourth season, even when the film's director, M. Night Shyamalan insisted they work on a fourth season instead. After the critical and commercial failure of the film, the pair would later claim they never wanted the live action film to be made in the first place.

In a 2010 interview the president of Nickelodeon, Cyma Zarghami, confirmed that DiMartino and Konietzko were developing a new series for the network, called The Legend of Korra. The series premiered on April 14, 2012, running 12 episodes for the first book "Air" and 14 for the second book "Spirits", which premiered on September 13, 2013, to 2.60 million viewers in the U.S., then the third book "Change" and the fourth and final book "Balance" of 13 episodes each.

On October 4, 2016, DiMartino released a new original novel, Rebel Genius. The story features a 12-year-old protagonist, Giacomo, who discovers he has a magical 'Genius,' the living embodiment of an artist's creative spirit, in a world where artistic expression is outlawed. Intended to be trilogy, Macmillan Publishers released two books in the series before canceling the publication of the third. The series received mixed to negative reviews.

In September 2018, it was announced that Konietzko and DiMartino would serve as executive producers and showrunners for Netflix's live-action adaptation series of Avatar: The Last Airbender. On August 12, 2020, Konietzko and DiMartino revealed on social media that they had both departed the show due to creative differences with the Netflix team.

In February 2021, ViacomCBS announced the formation of Avatar Studios, a division of Nickelodeon centered on developing newer animated series and movies set in the same universe as Avatar: The Last Airbender and The Legend of Korra, with both DiMartino and Konietzko helming the studio as co-chief creative officers. The studio's first film, Avatar Aang: The Last Airbender was expected to release on October 10, 2025, then was delayed to January 30, 2026, and then was delayed again to its current release date of October 9, 2026.

== Personal life ==
DiMartino was born in Shelburne, Vermont. He graduated from the Rhode Island School of Design in 1996, where he majored in animation. He met Bryan Konietzko, with whom he created Avatar, while in college. DiMartino is married to Shoshana Stolove (born 1970), a yoga teacher and jewelry designer who promotes New Age beliefs such as crystal healing. The couple have fraternal twins, a son named Hawk and a daughter named Opal, born in 2016. DiMartino resides in the Highland Park neighborhood of Los Angeles, California with his family.

== Filmography ==
Year	Title	Creator / Showrunner	Director	Writer	Executive Producer	Story Editor	Actor	Role	Notes
1999–2002	Family Guy	No	Yes	No	No	No	No	—N/a	6 episodes
2000–2003	King of the Hill	No	Yes	No	No	No	No	—N/a	3 episodes
2002	Mission Hill	No	Yes	No	No	No	No	—N/a	Episode "Unemployment: Part 2"
2005–2008	Avatar: The Last Airbender	Co-creator	Yes	Yes	Yes	Yes	No	—N/a	
2010	The Last Airbender	Co-creator	No	No	Yes	No	No	—N/a	
2012–2014	The Legend of Korra	Co-creator	Yes	Yes	Yes	Yes	Yes	Various voices	
2021	Adventures in Wonder Park	No	Yes	No	No	No	No	—N/a	Pilot only
2024–	Avatar: The Last Airbender	Co-creator	No	Yes	No	No	No		
2026	Avatar Aang: The Last Airbender	Co-creator	No	story	Yes	No	No		
2026–	Avatar: Seven Havens	Co-creator	No	No	Yes	No	No		
