= Bryan Konietzko =

American animation director (born 1976)

- Konietzko at the 2025 New York Comic Con
- Born: Bryan Joseph Konietzko; May 26, 1976 (age 50); Cleveland, Ohio, U.S.
- Education: Rhode Island School of Design (BFA)
- Occupations: Animator, producer, writer, director
- Years active: 1998–present
- Known for: Co-creator of Avatar Legends
- Title: Co-Chief Creative Officer, Avatar Studios
- Spouse: Elisabeth Louisa Wahlander (m. 2010)

Bryan Joseph Konietzko (born May 26, 1976) is an American animator, writer, producer, director, and voice actor. He is best known, together with Michael Dante DiMartino, as the co-creator of the Avatar Legends franchise. He also provided additional voice roles in both shows, most notably the Pirate Barker and Foaming Mouth Guy in Avatar: The Last Airbender and the Equalist Guard in The Legend of Korra.

== Career ==
Konietzko has worked as a character designer at Film Roman for Family Guy and as assistant director for Mission Hill and King of the Hill. He was hired as a storyboard artist and art director for the Nickelodeon animated series Invader Zim in 2000. When Invader Zim concluded in 2002, Konietzko and his friend, Michael Dante DiMartino, were recruited by Eric Coleman to pitch their own series to Nickelodeon, which resulted in the creation of Avatar: The Last Airbender.

Between 2002 and 2014, Konietzko, together with DiMartino, were mainly occupied with writing and producing the animated series Avatar: The Last Airbender and its sequel The Legend of Korra for Nickelodeon. Konietzko's and DiMartino's long-standing creative partnership is collectively referred to as "Bryke" by fans, in reference to "shipping" naming conventions.

Avatar: The Last Airbender head writer Aaron Ehasz believed that a fourth season would be created, but this plan was interrupted when Konietzko and DiMartino decided to focus on assisting M. Night Shyamalan as executive producers for The Last Airbender film. Konietzko and DiMartino have denied Ehasz's statements, asserting that a fourth season was never considered by them or Nickelodeon. Nonetheless, Konietzko and DiMartino stated they offered their input during the film's production but it was largely ignored.

As of 2015, Konietzko was working on writing and illustrating a sci-fi graphic novel series, Threadworlds, that is to be published by First Second Books, but there is no release date.

In September 2018, Netflix announced that Konietzko and DiMartino would serve as executive producers and showrunners for the live-action series based on Avatar: The Last Airbender, which released in 2024. On August 12, 2020, Konietzko and DiMartino revealed on social media that they had both departed the show, due to creative differences with the Netflix team.

In February 2021, ViacomCBS announced the formation of Avatar Studios, a division of Nickelodeon centered on developing newer animated series and movies set in the same universe as Avatar: The Last Airbender and The Legend of Korra, with both DiMartino and Konietzko helming the studio as co-chief creative officers. The studio's first film, Avatar Aang: The Last Airbender was expected to release on October 10, 2025, then was delayed to January 30, 2026, and then was delayed again to its current release date of October 9, 2026.

== Personal life ==
Konietzko was born on May 26, 1976 in a suburb of Cleveland, Ohio. He grew up around Atlanta and Louisville, Kentucky and graduated from Roswell High School in Roswell, Georgia, a suburb north of Atlanta. In 1994, he went back to Ohio and did his foundation year at the Art Academy of Cincinnati. He transferred to the Rhode Island School of Design where he met his friend and future collaborator, Michael Dante DiMartino. He earned a Bachelor of Fine Arts (BFA) in Illustration in 1998. He joined DiMartino in Los Angeles, California, where the latter helped the former get his foot in the door of the TV animation industry. He lived in Waterbury, Vermont in 2023. Konietzko is married to professional dancer Elisabeth "Lisa" Wahlander (born 1981). Wahlander was an employee of his, whom he met during the production of Avatar: The Last Airbender, where she worked as a martial arts coordinator and videographer.

Konietzko is also active in photography and has a band, Ginormous, with which he has released several albums. These include Our Ancestors' Intense Love Affair and At Night, Under Artificial Light. In 2017, he founded a heavy metal band named Eonothem.

== Filmography ==
Year	Title	Creator / Showrunner	Director	Writer	Executive Producer	Actor	Art Director	Notes
1999–2000	Family Guy	No	No	No	No	No	No	8 episodes, character designer
2002	Invader Zim	No	No	No	No	No	Yes	1 episode
2005–2008	Avatar: The Last Airbender	Co-creator	Yes	Yes	Yes	Yes	Yes	Voiced Pirate Barker and Foaming Mouth Guy
2010	The Last Airbender	Co-creator	No	No	Yes	No	No	
2012–2014	The Legend of Korra	Co-creator	Yes	Yes	Yes	Yes	Yes	Voiced Equalist Guard
2013	Republic City Hustle	Yes	No	Yes	Yes	No	No	TV mini series
2021	Dota: Dragon's Blood	No	No	No	No	No	No	1 episode, television story by
2024–	Avatar: The Last Airbender	Co-creator	No	Yes	No	No	No	
2026	Avatar Aang: The Last Airbender	Co-creator	No	story	Yes	No	No	
2026–	Avatar: Seven Havens	Co-creator	No	No	Yes	No	No	
