= The Last Airbender (film) =

2010 film by M. Night Shyamalan

- Theatrical release poster
- Directed by: M. Night Shyamalan
- Written by: M. Night Shyamalan
- Based on: Avatar: The Last Airbender by: Michael Dante DiMartino; Bryan Konietzko
- Produced by: M. Night Shyamalan; Sam Mercer; Frank Marshall
- Starring: Noah Ringer; Dev Patel; Nicola Peltz; Jackson Rathbone; Shaun Toub; Aasif Mandvi; Cliff Curtis
- Cinematography: Andrew Lesnie
- Edited by: Conrad Buff
- Music by: James Newton Howard
- Production companies: Nickelodeon Movies; Blinding Edge Pictures; The Kennedy/Marshall Company
- Distributed by: Paramount Pictures
- Release dates: June 30, 2010 (Alice Tully Hall); July 1, 2010 (United States)
- Running time: 103 minutes
- Country: United States
- Language: English
- Budget: $150 million
- Box office: $319.7 million

The Last Airbender is a 2010 American fantasy action-adventure film based on the first season of the animated television series, Avatar: The Last Airbender (2005–2008). Written and directed by M. Night Shyamalan, the film stars an ensemble cast featuring Noah Ringer, Dev Patel, Nicola Peltz, Jackson Rathbone, Shaun Toub, Aasif Mandvi, and Cliff Curtis. The plot follows Aang, a young Avatar who must master all four elements of air, water, earth, and fire to bring balance to the world while stopping the Fire Nation from conquering the Water Tribes and the Earth Kingdom.

Development for the film began in January 2007, with casting and pre-production taking place in 2008. Principal photography began in March 2009 and ended in September, with two weeks' shooting in Greenland, and the rest of the film being shot in various locations in Pennsylvania, United States. Post-production began in August and took several months due to the extensive visual effects. The name Avatar was dropped from the title to avoid confusion with James Cameron's 2009 film, Avatar.

The Last Airbender premiered at the Alice Tully Hall in New York City on June 30, 2010, and was theatrically released in the United States the following day by Paramount Pictures. The film was universally panned by critics, audiences, and fans of the animated series alike upon release, who criticized Shyamalan's direction and screenplay, the acting performances, editing, visual effects, action sequences, use of voice-over, whitewashed casting, unfaithfulness to the source material, and use of 3D, though some did praise Lesnie's cinematography and Howard's musical score. It is often considered one of the worst films of all time, and has been publicly disavowed by fans and the creators of the original series. Despite the film making a profit at the box office, grossing $319.7 million worldwide against a $150 million budget, it was still considered a box-office disappointment. The film's scathing critical reception and disappointing box-office results led to the studio canceling a planned trilogy of films. A live-action television series adaptation of the original animated series produced by Netflix would premiere fourteen years later to an improved reception.

== Plot ==
A century has passed since the Fire Nation declared war on the other three nations of air, water, and earth in its attempt to conquer the world. Sokka and his younger sister Katara, who live in the Southern Water Tribe, discover an unusual iceberg. Breaking into the iceberg releases a beam of light and reveals a twelve-year-old boy named Aang and his pet flying bison Appa.

Zuko, the disgraced prince of the Fire Nation, detects the light from Aang's release and arrives at the Southern Water Tribe to demand the villagers hand over the Avatar: the only person capable of manipulating, or "bending", all four elements of air, water, earth, and fire. Aang surrenders himself to save the village, but escapes the Fire Nation ship and flies to Appa, brought by Katara and Sokka. The trio travel to Aang's homeland at the Southern Air Temple, where Aang learns he was in the iceberg for a century and that the Fire Nation wiped out the other Air Nomads, including his guardian Monk Gyatso. In despair, Aang enters the Avatar State and finds himself in the Spirit World where he encounters a Dragon Spirit. Katara's pleas bring Aang out of the Avatar State.

The group arrives at an Earth Kingdom village controlled by the Fire Nation. When they are arrested and imprisoned, they incite a rebellion, battling and defeating the Fire Nation soldiers occupying the village. Aang tells Katara and Sokka that he only knows airbending and has yet to master the other three elements. They make their way to the Northern Water Tribe where Aang can learn from waterbending masters.

During a side trip to the Northern Air Temple, Aang is betrayed by a peasant and captured by Fire Nation archers led by Commander Zhao. However, a masked marauder called the Blue Spirit helps Aang escape. Zhao realizes that Zuko is the Blue Spirit, and has a crossbowman fire a bolt that knocks Zuko out, but Aang uses his skills to escape with the unconscious Zuko. Aang watches over Zuko until morning, then leaves to reunite with Sokka and Katara. Zhao tries again to kill Zuko by blowing up his ship, but Zuko secretly survives and sneaks aboard Zhao's ship.

Upon arriving, Aang and company are welcomed by the citizens of the Northern Water Tribe, and waterbending master Pakku teaches Aang and Katara. The Fire Nation arrives and Zhao begins his attack while Zuko continues his independent search for the Avatar. After defeating Katara in battle, Zuko captures Aang, who reenters the Avatar State to search for the Dragon Spirit for help to defeat the Fire Nation. The Dragon Spirit advises him to "use the ocean and show the power of water".

Returning to his body, Aang battles Zuko until Katara freezes Zuko in ice, then leaves to join the battle. Zuko's uncle Iroh and Zhao make their way to a sacred cave where Zhao captures the Moon Spirit. Despite Iroh's pleas, Zhao kills the Moon Spirit to strip all the waterbenders of their abilities. Enraged by Zhao's sacrilege, Iroh reveals his mastery of firebending, frightening Zhao and his entourage out of the sacred cave. Princess Yue gives her life to revive the Moon Spirit. Zhao finds out Zuko survived and they prepare to fight, but Iroh talks Zuko out of it and Zhao is drowned by waterbenders. Recalling his life before being trapped in the ice, Aang enters the Avatar State and raises the ocean into a gigantic wall to drive the Fire Nation back.

Zuko's father Fire Lord Ozai learns of the defeat and tasks his daughter Princess Azula with preventing the Avatar from mastering earth and fire before the return of Sozin’s Comet in three years.

== Cast ==
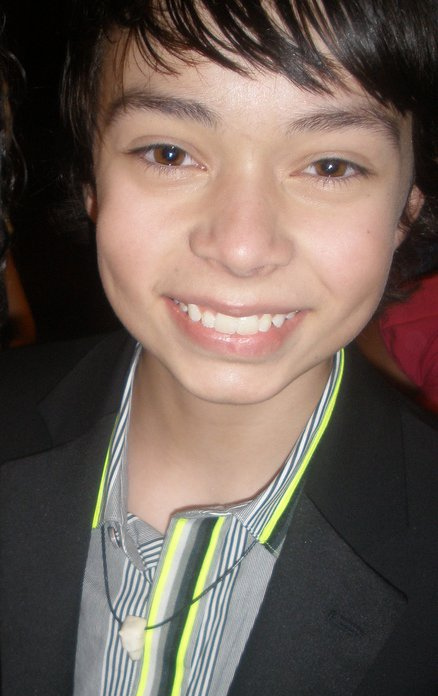
Noah Ringer made his acting debut in the film as Aang. A practitioner of Taekwondo, Ringer shaved his head to stay cool during his training. His resemblance to the television series' protagonist led to him being nicknamed "Avatar".

- Noah Ringer as Aang:
  A young boy who is one of the last Airbenders who disappeared from public sight a hundred years ago. While chronologically 112 years old, Aang still retains his biological age of 12. He is the latest incarnation of the Avatar Spirit. Though he is capable of bending all four elements, at the beginning of the film he has only learned to airbend.
- Dev Patel as Prince Zuko:
  A sixteen-year-old Fire Nation prince who travels with his Uncle Iroh. The former heir to the throne, he was exiled by his father, Fire Lord Ozai, who caused him a facial scar following a battle with him and ordered him to capture the Avatar (who had not been seen in almost a century, making the assignment a wild-goose chase) in order to regain his lost honor.
- Nicola Peltz as Katara:
  A fourteen-year-old girl of the Southern Water Tribe and its last remaining waterbender. Since the death of her mother, Kya, she has served as the motherly figure in her family and is no stranger to responsibility despite her young age.
- Jackson Rathbone as Sokka:
  Katara's fifteen-year-old brother and a warrior from the Southern Water Tribe. He can be condescending and has no waterbending abilities. He often takes up leadership roles, by virtue of coming up with most of the workable plans and tactics.
- Shaun Toub as General Iroh:
  Zuko's paternal uncle and the brother of Fire Lord Ozai. He is very easy-going and friendly and often acts as a surrogate father to Zuko. Formerly a great general of the Fire Nation, personal tragedies led to his retirement, and the role of heir-presumptive passed to his younger brother. He is the only firebender shown in the film who is advanced enough to bend fire using only his ch'i.
- Aasif Mandvi as Commander/Admiral Zhao:
  A hot-tempered Fire Nation Commander in pursuit of the Avatar. He is Zuko's principal rival. Also, unlike his animated series counterpart, he has an obsession with libraries.
- Seychelle Gabriel as Princess Yue:
  The princess of the Northern Water Tribe, who was Sokka's love interest. In a tragic turn of events, she sacrificed herself to save the water tribe and the balance of the planet, by turning into the moon.
- Francis Guinan as Master Pakku:
  A waterbending master of the Northern Water Tribe who taught Aang to waterbend.
- Randall Duk Kim as Old man in temple:
  An Earth Kingdom villager, who often visits the remains of the Northern Air Temple.
- Isaac Jin Solstein as Haru:
  He started the prison uprising by earthbending a pebble to the back of the lead Fire Nation soldier's head.
- Keong Sim as Tyro:
  He and other earthbenders in his occupied village agreed to be imprisoned in exchange for the non-benders being allowed to live in peace.
- John Noble as the voice of the Dragon Spirit:
  A new composite character taking over the roles of Avatar Roku, Fang, Koh and Guru Pathik from the animated series.
- Katharine Houghton as Kanna (Gran Gran):
  Katara and Sokka's paternal grandmother. She gives her grandchildren her blessing to rescue and travel with Aang, as she believes him to be the Avatar and that they're destined to travel with him to save the world.
- Damon Gupton as Monk Gyatso:
  He was Aang's mentor and best friend in the Northern Air Temple, providing him spiritual guidance. He is long dead by the time Aang is awakened, having died when the Fire Nation first attacked the Air Nomads 100 years prior to the events of the film.
- Summer Bishil as Princess Azula:
  The fourteen-year-old daughter of Fire Lord Ozai and sister to Prince Zuko. She appears once at the battle where Zuko refuses to fight and again at the end where she accepts the role as hunter of her older brother and uncle, and destroyer of the Avatar.
- Cliff Curtis as Fire Lord Ozai:
  The mighty leader of the Fire Nation, the brother of Iroh, and the father of Prince Zuko and Princess Azula.

== Production ==
=== Development ===
On January 8, 2007, Paramount Pictures and Nickelodeon Movies announced that they had signed M. Night Shyamalan to write, direct, and produce a trilogy of live-action films based on Avatar: The Last Airbender. The first of these films was to be a faithful adaptation of the main characters' adventures in Book One: Water. According to an interview with the co-creators in SFX magazine, Shyamalan came across Avatar: The Last Airbender when his daughter wanted to be Katara for Halloween. Intrigued, Shyamalan researched and watched the series with his family. "Watching Avatar has become a family event in my house... so we are looking forward to how the story develops in season three," said Shyamalan. "Once I saw the amazing world that Mike and Bryan created, I knew it would make a great feature film". He added he was attracted to the spiritual and martial arts influences on the show.

Avatar: The Last Airbender co-creators Michael Dante DiMartino and Bryan Konietzko voiced their opinion in an interview regarding Shyamalan writing, directing, and producing the film. The two displayed much enthusiasm over Shyamalan's decision for the adaptation, stating that they admire his work and, in turn, he respects their material. In a 2014 interview, Konietzko and DiMartino said that the project was given the go-ahead without their approval, and when they tried to provide input, it all got pushed to the wayside. Konietzko added even further that "A) We didn't want it to be done at all. Before anyone was attached, we didn't want it. And then B) If it was going to be done, we wanted to do it, but they weren't going to let us. C) When they attached Night, we just thought, 'Well, this is what we've been dealt. We'll just offer help when it's asked of us, and if it's not, we'll stay out of the way'. In the beginning, it was more positive and we offered help, but then we had a big falling out". Producer Frank Marshall stated he hoped for the film to achieve a family-friendly rating: "I'm not even sure we want to get in the PG-13 realm." Furthermore, Shyamalan said, "A lot of the inspiration for the direction we took comes from a friend of mine. A Nathan Blackmer helped shape this Idea into the film it became. I took away a little bit of the slapsticky stuff that was there for the little little kids, the fart jokes and things like that...We grounded Katara's brother...and that really did wonderful things for the whole theme of the movie." Brad Grey said that despite the director's career being inconsistent, he "believed in [Shyamalan's] vision and that he could execute it," adding that "It's a bold step because he had to create a potential new franchise." The studio was willing to spend $250 million on a trilogy of films, one for each season. The Last Airbender's budget wound up being $150 million, in addition to over $130 million spent on marketing costs, making it Shyamalan's most expensive film. During production, the name Avatar was removed from the title to avoid confusion with the 2009 film Avatar.

=== Casting ===
Shyamalan originally offered the roles of Aang to Noah Ringer; Sokka to Jackson Rathbone; Katara to Nicola Peltz; and Zuko to Jesse McCartney. In an interview with People, Shyamalan claimed that he did not want to make The Last Airbender without Nicola Peltz, "I said that only once before in my career, and that was when I met Haley in The Sixth Sense auditions." In February 2009, Dev Patel replaced Jesse McCartney, whose tour dates conflicted with a boot camp scheduled for the cast to train in martial arts. However, McCartney has since claimed that he had been replaced by the producers for political reasons shortly before filming began, and had no say in the matter. Katharine Houghton played "Gran Gran", the grandmother of Katara and Sokka, and Seychelle Gabriel portrayed Princess Yue, a love interest of Sokka's and princess of the Northern Water Tribe. Isaac Jin Solstein played an earthbending boy. Comedian Aasif Mandvi was cast as Commander Zhao, Cliff Curtis as Fire Lord Ozai, and Keong Sim was cast in the role of an Earthbender.

Ringer began practicing Taekwondo – the martial art and national sport of Korea – at the age of 10. He began shaving his head during his martial arts training to help cool off, which gave him the nickname "Avatar" due to his resemblance to Aang from the animated series. When he heard about the film adaptation, he made an audition tape with his instructor and sent it to the filmmakers. Having not acted before, Ringer was required to attend acting school a month before filming commenced. Peltz was familiar with the character before submitting for the part of Katara, having been a fan of the animated series.

Before Slumdog Millionaire was released, Patel auditioned for the role of Zuko by submitting a tape to the studio. Shyamalan called Patel personally to inform him that he got the part. Training for the film was intense, as he had to learn Wushu and different martial arts. Patel recalls fighting, punching, and throwing, and said the experience was "truly amazing." While he was filming Slumdog in India, he would finish a take and turn one of the channels over to the animated series. Even though it is based on a cartoon, he wanted to bring as much of himself as possible to the character he was portraying. Shaun Toub, who was cast as Iroh, describes his character in the first film as "loose" and "free". He compares Zuko's "obsession" to his childhood memories and how kids are always looking for their parents' approval, saying that Zuko just wants his father's. "He isn't necessarily bad; he just has a great deal of built up anger and forgets to consider others. I think people will understand that he's not bad, he's just angry and hurting because he really wants his father to love him, but his father is too busy with other things." He says that Patel was able to influence him into appreciating the business of filmmaking more. While comparing the animated series to the film, he says the film is much more serious. He attributed this change to the director trying to relate to every age group, rather than just kids.

==== Casting controversy ====
The casting of white actors in the East Asian and Amerindian-influenced Avatar universe, as well as the fact that the casting of the heroes and villains seemed to be racially backward from the show, triggered negative reactions from fans marked by accusations of racism, a letter-writing campaign, and various protests. "To take this incredibly loved children's series, and really distort not only the ethnicity of the individual characters but the message of acceptance and cultural diversity that the original series advocated, is a huge blow," said Michael Le of Racebending.com, a fan site calling for a boycott of the film. As a result of the casting, the Media Action Network for Asian-Americans also called for a boycott of the film. "This was a great opportunity to create new Asian-American stars...I'm disappointed," stated Guy Aoki, president of the organization. After a casting call specifically looking for "Caucasians and other ethnicities," Shyamalan explained that "Ultimately, this movie, and then the three movies, will be the most culturally diverse tent-pole movies ever released, period," to reassure critics. Furthermore, Paramount provided a statement about the casting choices, "The movie has 23 credited speaking roles – more than half of which feature Asian and Pan Asian actors of Korean, Japanese and Indian descent. The filmmaker's interpretation reflects the myriad qualities that have made this series a global phenomenon. We believe fans of the original and new audiences alike will respond positively once they see it."

Shyamalan commented on the issues regarding fans' perceptions of the casting, "Anime is based on ambiguous facial features. It's meant to be interpretive. It's meant to be inclusive of all races, and you can see yourself in all these characters...This is a multicultural movie and I'm going to make it even more multicultural in my approach to its casting. There's African-Americans in the movie...so it's a source of pride for me. The irony that [protesters] would label this with anything but the greatest pride, that the movie poster has Noah and Dev on it and my name on it. I don't know what else to do." Rathbone also dismissed the complaints saying, "I think it's one of those things where I pull my hair up, shave the sides, and I definitely need a tan. It's one of those things where, hopefully, the audience will suspend disbelief a little bit." The controversy was poorly received by critics as well. Film critic Roger Ebert was one of the critical voices against the casting. When asked about casting a white cast to portray the characters, he said, "The original series Avatar: The Last Airbender was highly regarded and popular for three seasons on Nickelodeon. Its fans take it for granted that its heroes are Asian. Why would Paramount and Shyamalan go out of their way to offend these fans? There are many young Asian actors capable of playing the parts."

In July 2013, series co-creator Bryan Konietzko responded to an online comment about skin color in The Legend of Korra. Konietzko wrote that his work on the two series "speaks for itself which obviously does not include the gross misinterpretations and misrepresentations of our work in [Shyamalan's] work."

=== Filming ===
Pre-production began in late 2008, while filming began on 13 March 2009 in Greenland. After two weeks, the cast and crew moved to Reading, Pennsylvania, where production designers and visual effects crews worked for several weeks, preparing the local site for the film. A production team scouting the area found the pagoda on Mount Penn, which served as an ancient temple in the film. Reading mayor Tom McMahon explained that crews made road improvements and buried electrical lines surrounding the structure.

Filming also took place in Ontelaunee Township and at the William Penn Memorial Fire Tower in Pennsylvania after the production crew finished at the Pagoda. Some scenes were also shot in Philadelphia after the Berks Economic Development company showed the production "a number of buildings, but couldn't come up with enough to meet their requirements" because "they needed buildings to shoot all the interiors, and were looking for a group of buildings with high ceilings and specific column spacing". The production offices were leased from Temple University Health System at its corporate offices located at 2450 West Hunting Park Avenue. Rehearsals also took place at this location. Filming took place inside the abandoned Budd Company complex across the street, which was fitted out as a studio including temporary air conditioning piped into the set. Filming ended on 26 September 2009.

=== Visual effects ===
Pablo Helman, who previously worked on Star Wars: Episode II – Attack of the Clones, was the visual effects supervisor for the Industrial Light & Magic (ILM) team on the film. He worked with Shyamalan and a crew of about 300 people to realize the director's vision.

Upper: Water being animated. Lower: Final version of animated scene.

Industrial Light & Magic was tasked with creating the "bending" styles of the elemental tribes, as well as the mythical creatures and action stunts. Quickly generated previews allowed Shyamalan to direct as many as seventy takes to ensure the "performance" of each effect was right.

The large amount of particles involved in the earthbending effects were hardware intensive, but ILM team members have said that firebending and waterbending were the hardest to get right, as there was a dual challenge of making the elements look realistic but act in unrealistic ways. ILM's previous work on fire effects in the sixth Harry Potter film was built on for the firebending, as were practical references involving flames being pushed by giant air fans. To create the airbending effect, visual effects art director Christian Alzman and digital matte department supervisor Barry Williams took inspiration from the animated series and focused on dust and snow particles rather than seeing the air itself.

The film also used 3D matte paintings to accommodate long-duration shots with a constantly moving camera. For the fantastic creatures, the team studied real-world animal examples of the same size and weight as the animated character and then produced hybrids from different species. For example, the winged lemur Momo's flying was based on a giant fruit bat. Texturing, hair simulation, and light and shadow were added to make the final animation appear as real as possible during the later stages of character development.

Paramount Pictures made an announcement in late April 2010, revealing that The Last Airbender would be released in 3D. This decision came after an increasing number of films being made or converted to 3D, such as Avatar, Alice in Wonderland and Clash of the Titans, made a decent profit at the box office. Although Helman stated that Shyamalan's way of shooting without fast edits and the film's visuals could lend itself to the 3D conversion well, James Cameron voiced his disapproval on any film being converted using this process, saying, "You can slap a 3-D label on it and call it 3-D, but there's no possible way that it can be done up to a standard that anybody would consider high enough." Despite this, Shyamalan opted to work with Stereo D LLC, the company who worked on James Cameron's own Avatar. The conversion process for the film cost between $5 million and $10 million, adding to the reported $100 million that already went into the film.

=== Music ===
In December 2008, James Newton Howard was announced as the composer for The Last Airbender. The film marks the seventh collaboration between Howard and M. Night Shyamalan, with the latest being the 2008 film The Happening. On May 13, 2009, producer Frank Marshall announced that Howard was recording music for the teaser trailer that was later released that summer; it was later confirmed by Marshall that all of the film's trailers featured original music by Howard himself. The soundtrack, released by Lakeshore Records on June 29, 2010, required Howard to hire a 119-member ensemble. Running at about 66 minutes, it contains eleven tracks ranging from three to seven minutes, and one track, "Airbender Suite", that is nearly eleven minutes long. Reviews for the score were overwhelmingly positive.

== Marketing and release ==
=== Promotion ===
The teaser trailer for the film was attached to Transformers: Revenge of the Fallen, released in theaters on June 24, 2009. The teaser trailer was also shown exclusively on the June 22, 2009 episode of Entertainment Tonight. The trailer shows Aang airbending in a temple which is being attacked by a multitude of Fire Nation ships. Three additional trailers were released leading up to the film's release.

The first TV spot aired during Super Bowl XLIV on February 7, 2010. It showed parts of the film that were not shown in the teaser trailer and had no diegetic dialogue, but merely narration. On February 10, the theatrical trailer was released online.

On February 9, 2010, Nickelodeon Consumer Products also debuted the upcoming line of toys based on The Last Airbender. It includes various 3 3/4-inch action figures, as well as larger, action-enabled figures, costumes, and other props. Among the toys featured in the line were figures based on Aang, Prince Zuko, Sokka, Katara, and a fully ride-able Appa the Sky Bison. "We worked very closely with M. Night, the rest of the Paramount team and our in-house design team, along with our partner Spin-Master, to come up with the right assortment, the right size for these action figures and make sure we had representation of all the nations within the 'Airbender' series," said Nickelodeon's Lourdes Arocho. The Last Airbender action figures released in three "waves"; with wave one beginning on June 1, wave two near the film's July release date, and wave three near the 2010 holiday season. THQ Studio Australia also developed a video game based on the film, which was released on June 29, 2010, for the Wii and the Nintendo DS.

=== Release ===
To avoid confusion with James Cameron's Avatar, the title was changed from Avatar: The Last Airbender to simply The Last Airbender. The film premiered in New York City on June 30, 2010, and opened the following day in 3,169 theaters, against The Twilight Saga: Eclipse which also stars Jackson Rathbone.

=== Home media ===
The Last Airbender was released on DVD and Blu-ray on November 16, 2010. At the same time, a Blu-ray 3D version was also made available exclusively at Best Buy locations. The Last Airbender was re-released on DVD and Blu-ray on April 25, 2017. The film has earned $48.7 million from DVD/Blu-ray sales, with 1.6 million DVDs and 300,000 Blu-ray discs sold as of December 2010. The Last Airbender will be released on 4K Ultra HD Blu-ray on November 3, 2026.

== Reception ==
=== Box office ===
The Last Airbender grossed $131,772,187 in the United States, and $187,941,694 in other countries, making for a total of $319,713,881 worldwide. On its opening day in the United States, The Last Airbender made $16,614,112, ranking fifth overall for Thursday openings, and placed second behind The Twilight Saga: Eclipse. For its opening three-day, Fourth of July weekend, The Last Airbender accumulated a total of $40,325,019. The following Monday, it grossed $11,479,213. 54% of its total gross was from 3D presentations at 1,606 screens. On Thursday, July 1, 2010, its opening day, it debuted at #2 behind The Twilight Saga: Eclipse. Opening internationally in 923 sites, the film grossed an estimated $9 million, $8 million of which was from 870 sites in Russia, making it the number one film there. The film grossed $9.4 million from its second weekend in international markets. The film was the twentieth highest-grossing film of 2010, and is the fourth-highest-grossing film produced by Nickelodeon Movies, behind The SpongeBob Movie: Sponge Out of Water (2015), Teenage Mutant Ninja Turtles (2014), and The Adventures of Tintin (2011).

=== Critical response ===
The Last Airbender was universally panned by critics, audiences and fans alike. On Rotten Tomatoes, 5% of 192 reviews are positive, with an average rating of 2.9/10, making it the lowest-rated film produced by Nickelodeon Movies and Shyamalan's worst-reviewed film to date. The site's critical consensus reads, "The Last Airbender squanders its popular source material with incomprehensible plotting, horrible acting, and detached joyless direction." On Metacritic, it has a weighted average score of 20 out of 100, based on 33 reviews, indicating "generally unfavorable reviews". Audiences polled by CinemaScore gave the film an average rating of "C" on an A+ to F scale.

Liam Lacey of The Globe and Mail stated the film had little chance to develop its characters and therefore suffered, with the overall storyline of the film becoming a run-on narrative. According to Owen Gleiberman from Entertainment Weekly, who gave the film a C, "The Last Airbender keeps throwing things at you, but its final effect is, in every way, flat." Roger Ebert of the Chicago Sun-Times gave the film half a star in his review, stating that it "bores and alienates its audiences," and notes the poor use of 3D among the film's faults. Keith Phipps of The A.V. Club gave the film an F, criticizing the performances of the child actors, overuse of exposition, and shoehorned 3D special effects, calling it the worst summer blockbuster of 2010. Kirk Honeycutt of The Hollywood Reporter said that the lack of correct casting caused the film to lose substantial credibility in regard to its source material, but did praise the casting and acting of Ringer as Aang. Peter Debruge of Variety criticized the casting and the score, saying that the overall effect of each play into making the film a bore. Rifftrax put the film at number 5 of The Top 10 Worst Movies of All Time, saying "We CAN state for the record that it is quite easy to detest this movie even if you've never seen a frame of the TV show."

"The Last Airbender" is an agonizing experience in every category I can think of and others still waiting to be invented. The laws of chance suggest that something should have gone right. Not here. It puts a nail in the coffin of low-rent 3D, but it will need a lot more coffins than that.

— Roger Ebert, Sun Times

Charlie Jane Anders in the review by io9 criticized "the personality-free hero, the nonsensical plot twists, the CG clutter, the bland romance, the new-age pablum", concluding that "Shyamalan's true achievement in this film is that he takes a thrilling cult TV series, Avatar: The Last Airbender, and he systematically leeches all the personality and soul out of it – in order to create something generic enough to serve as a universal spoof of every epic, ever." Anders summarized the experience of watching the film by stating that, "Actually, my exact words when I walked out of this film were, 'Wow, this makes Dragonball Evolution look like a masterpiece.'" Ain't It Cool News's review questioned why Shyamalan was allowed to write the script, as well as why he was even chosen to direct such a high-profile film after a string of previous flops: "Burdened by [a] never-ending onslaught of expository dialogue awkwardly delivered by actors giving career-worst performances across the board, The Last Airbender is so outrageously bad it's a wonder it ever got before cameras."

Scott Bowles of USA Today gave a generally favorable review, claiming that Shyamalan delivered on fight scenes and the film worked as a kid's film, although he also added that poor scriptwriting made some of the performances sound wooden. Another favorable review came from Stephanie Zacharek of MovieLine, who praised the way Shyamalan captures the art of action and human motion. David Roark of Relevant Magazine accused other critics of having a bias against Shyamalan and gave the film a positive review, stating that its visuals and heart far outweighed the clunky plotting and "awful" dialogue.

Peter Bradshaw of The Guardian noted an unfortunate linguistic problem that reduced British viewers to "a state of nervous collapse" due to laughter. In British English, 'bent' is a slang term for gay, with 'bender' meaning a gay man, giving an entirely different meaning to lines such as, "I could tell at once that you were a bender." Bradshaw commented that the response from the audience to such lines was "deafeningly immature" and would "inevitably be repeated in every cinema in the land showing The Last Airbender." Bradshaw expressed his amazement that Shyamalan has managed to make a film worse than Lady in the Water or The Happening. Kirk Honneycut of The Hollywood Reporter wrote, "Shyamalan, who never has mounted an epic film before, gets only passing grades. Huge sets and unit work from Greenland to New Zealand all look strangely underlit. One wonders whether the projector blew a light bulb. The movie was foolishly converted to 3D after principal photography, but if anything, this conversion is worse than Clash of the Titans." A Collider.com review says: "I'm calling it: The Last Airbender is the worst movie of 2010. It's too disturbing to consider that there could be something even more hideous out there."

=== Crew responses ===
Shyamalan initially argued that his style and art-form of storytelling resulted in the negative reviews of the film and compared it to asking a painter to change to a different style: "I bring as much integrity to the table as humanly possible. It must be a language thing, in terms of a particular accent, a storytelling accent. I can only see it this certain way and I don't know how to think in another language. I think these are exactly the visions that are in my head, so I don't know how to adjust it without being me."

Shyamalan also addressed criticisms about the barely 90-minute runtime of the film, which was considered bizarre given that it had to condense a 20-episode TV season into one film, and is a far shorter runtime than is typical for summer blockbusters. Shyamalan's response was that all of his previous films were 90 minutes because they were small-scale supernatural thrillers, and as a result, his instinct for the pacing of the film was to edit it down to 90 minutes. This short runtime indirectly led to several other problems which multiple critics objected to: characters frequently resort to giving long speeches of exposition to summarize entire scenes that were cut for time, and a running voiceover commentary by Katara was added in which she summarizes entire subplots (e.g. Sokka's relationship with Yue) that barely appear on-screen. When Shyamalan gave the Ashok C. Sani Distinguished Scholar-in-Residence lecture at NYU's Stern School of Business on April 16, 2019, he revealed that he regretted accepting the directing position on the film, stating:

There has always been this inexorable pull to join the group, a constant seduction in the form of whatever you want to tally, in the form of money, or safety, ease, not getting criticized. I did these movies, and I rightfully got crushed, because they rightfully said, 'You don't believe in yourself, you don't believe in your own voice, and you don't believe in your values.

Shyamalan would go on to begin financing his own projects as a result. When Aasif Mandvi was asked about the film during a 2015 Q&A on Reddit, he said

Airbender was one the most awesome experiences I have ever had making a movie. I'm very glad i got to play that role and got to work with those people. No regrets! I think the film received an unfair level of criticism and that was partly because of a negative attitude and a thirst for blood towards M. Night. I'm not saying it was the greatest movie in the world but it somehow got singled out more than it deserved.

In a 2020 interview with Bustle, Giancarlo Volpe, who was a director on the original animated series, said

I thought the set design was great. I also think that CG Appa and Momo look great. If you squinted, it looked like the show. But where they sort of went wrong was that the characters and casting weren't really right. I thought that was unfortunate. I've said this multiple times: if there was ever any doubt that Avatar took place in sort of a mythical Asia or mythical China... it absolutely did. Don't let anyone tell you differently. And to cast it differently was an odd choice. I also think that they were trying to squeeze in 20 episodes [of plot] in a two-hour block, and what they really needed to do was simplify the story, which is hard to do. The fans can always watch the show again if they miss a particular story. They didn't have to squeeze everything into a two-hour movie, in my opinion.

Dev Patel expressed regret and dislike for his role and his experience with the film. At a 2016 actor's roundtable with The Hollywood Reporter while promoting his film Lion during Oscar contender season, Patel said,

I don't know what I would like to play, but I know what I'm afraid of playing: those big studio movies. After Slumdog, I did a film that was not well received at all. The budget of Slumdog was like the budget of the craft services of this movie. [...] I completely felt overwhelmed by the experience. I felt like I wasn't being heard. That was really scary for me, and that's really when I learned the power of no, the idea of saying no. Listen to that instinct you get when you read those words for the first time.

He described his performance as Prince Zuko as being as though he "saw a stranger on the screen that I couldn't relate to."

In a question-and-answer session on Reddit with Dante Basco, the original voice of Prince Zuko, when he was asked what he thought of the Last Airbender film, he responded by saying that he didn't see the film because the show's creators, Konietzko and DiMartino, told him not to see it.

=== Accolades ===
The Last Airbender received nine nominations at the 31st Golden Raspberry Awards including Worst Picture. The film went on to sweep the Razzies with five awards: Worst Picture, Worst Director (Shyamalan), Worst Screenplay (Shyamalan), Worst Supporting Actor (Jackson Rathbone), and a special award, "Worst Eye-Gouging Mis-Use of 3D."

Year	Award	Category	Nominee	Result	Ref.
2010	Teen Choice Awards	Choice Summer: Movie	The Last Airbender	Nominated	
2010	International Film Music Critics Association	Film Music Composition of the Year for "Flow Like Water"	James Newton Howard	Nominated	
2010	International Film Music Critics Association	Best Original Score for a Fantasy/Science Fiction/Horror film	James Newton Howard	Nominated	
2010	Young Artist Award	Best Performance in a Feature Film (Leading Young Actor)	Noah Ringer	Nominated	
2010	Young Artist Award	Best Performance in a Feature Film (Supporting Young Actress)	Seychelle Gabriel	Nominated	
2010	31st Golden Raspberry Awards	Worst Picture	Frank Marshall, Sam Mercer and M. Night Shyamalan	Won	
2010	31st Golden Raspberry Awards	Worst Director	M. Night Shyamalan	Won	
2010	31st Golden Raspberry Awards	Worst Screenplay	M. Night Shyamalan	Won	
2010	31st Golden Raspberry Awards	Worst Supporting Actor	Dev Patel	Nominated	
2010	31st Golden Raspberry Awards	Worst Supporting Actor	Jackson Rathbone (also for The Twilight Saga: Eclipse)	Won	
2010	31st Golden Raspberry Awards	Worst Supporting Actress	Nicola Peltz	Nominated	
2010	31st Golden Raspberry Awards	Worst Screen Couple / Worst Screen Ensemble	The Entire Cast	Nominated	
2010	31st Golden Raspberry Awards	Worst Prequel, Remake, Rip-off or Sequel	The Last Airbender	Nominated	
2010	31st Golden Raspberry Awards	Worst Eye-Gouging Mis-Use of 3D	The Last Airbender	Won	

== Cancelled sequel ==
While filming The Last Airbender, Shyamalan mapped out a rough draft for a second film that was "darker" and includes Azula, portrayed by Summer Bishil, as the main antagonist. In a July 2010 interview with New York Magazine, Shyamalan commented "In the next few months we'll be able to know whether we have that opportunity or not" when asked about the sequel. No such announcement was made, and in a September 2010 interview when asked if he knew when the sequel will be made, he replied, "I don't, because there are so many factors they take into account", adding, "I guess it will get into an area where it becomes a discussion – like pros and cons." In September 2015, Shyamalan told Metro UK that he may work on the sequel after completing his next thriller, which was supposed to start shooting in November 2015. Ultimately, due to the film's poor critical and financial reception, a sequel was never developed.

== Tie-ins ==
The Last Airbender Prequel: Zuko's Story cover

Two original black-and-white graphic novels, entitled The Last Airbender Prequel: Zuko's Story and The Last Airbender, drawn in the manga style, were written by Dave Roman and Alison Wilgus. "Avatar: The Last Airbender has shown incredible crossover appeal with manga fans. The release of The Last Airbender movie and original tie-in manga gives us the chance to share completely new stories with Avatar fans looking for more about Aang, Zuko, and their favorite characters." Dallas Middaugh, Associate Publisher of Del Rey Manga said in a statement. The second graphic novel was released on June 22, 2010. The plot, like the film, is a condensed version of the first season of the series.

The prequel, Zuko's Story, is co-written by Benjamin Alison Wilgus and Dave Roman and illustrated by Nina Matsumoto and was released on May 18, 2010. The synopsis for the graphic novel was released in early 2010, "When Prince Zuko dared to question authority, his father, Fire Lord Ozai, banished him from the Fire Nation. Horribly scarred and stripped of everything he held dear, Zuko has wandered the earth for almost three years in search of his only chance at redemption: the Avatar, a mystical being who once kept the four nations in balance. Everyone he encounters believes that this is an impossible task, as the Avatar disappeared a century ago. But Zuko stubbornly continues the search. He must regain his honor, so his quest is all he has left."

Roman and Wilgus, who developed comics based on the series for Nick Magazine, consulted series creators Mike Dante DiMartino and Bryan Konietzko, and the head writer for the show Aaron Ehasz while they were developing Zuko's Story. The four wanted to try a comic that would fit into with the continuity of the show. The prequel, though mostly associated with the film, was meant to be a prequel to the series. Roman explained, "In a lot of ways, it's like an expanded origin. With the film and the series, there are differences and there are places where they split off, but the setup for both is exactly the same – so when you're introduced to the characters, that's the part where they're completely identical." The prequel allowed the expansions of different details told in the series; for example, an episode called "The Blue Spirit" in the series was seen in the film. However, since explaining everything that happened in that episode was hard to translate onto film, the prequel allowed for them to "delve" into that specific story. What more, when asked about whether he answered some questions that were left open at the end of the series, Roman stated that, while he had a strong relationship with the show's creators and got their blessing for his project, it wasn't his plot to address.

== See also ==
- List of Avatar: The Last Airbender characters
- List of 21st-century films considered the worst
