= Avatar Aang: The Last Airbender =

2026 film by Lauren Montgomery

- Official release poster
- Directed by: Lauren Montgomery
- Screenplay by: Tim Hedrick; Christopher Yost
- Story by: Bryan Konietzko; Michael Dante DiMartino; Tim Hedrick; Kenneth Lin
- Based on: Avatar: The Last Airbender by: Michael Dante DiMartino; Bryan Konietzko
- Produced by: Maryann Garger; Latifa Ouaou; Bryan Konietzko; Michael Dante DiMartino
- Starring: Eric Nam; Dave Bautista; Jessica Matten; Román Zaragoza; Dionne Quan; Taika Waititi; Geraldine Viswanathan; Ronny Chieng; Ken Jeong; Dee Bradley Baker; Steven Yeun; Freida Pinto; Ke Huy Quan
- Cinematography: Damon O'Beirne
- Edited by: Michelle Mendenhall
- Music by: Jeremy Zuckerman
- Production companies: Paramount Pictures; Nickelodeon Movies; Avatar Studios
- Distributed by: Paramount+
- Release dates: July 24, 2026 (San Diego Comic-Con) (Note: In addition to its premiere at San Diego Comic-Con, Avatar Aang: The Last Airbender was released in two American theaters—one in Los Angeles, and one in New York—as part of a limited engagement.); July 25, 2026 (Paramount+)
- Running time: 99 minutes
- Country: United States
- Language: English
- Budget: $80 million

Avatar Aang: The Last Airbender is a 2026 American animated fantasy action-adventure film directed by Lauren Montgomery from a screenplay by Tim Hedrick and Christopher Yost, based on a story by Bryan Konietzko, Michael Dante DiMartino, Hedrick, and Kenneth Lin. A continuation of the animated television series Avatar: The Last Airbender (2005–2008) created by Konietzko and DiMartino and the first production of Avatar Studios, the film stars the voices of Eric Nam, Dave Bautista, Jessica Matten, Román Zaragoza, Dionne Quan, Taika Waititi, Geraldine Viswanathan, Ronny Chieng, Ken Jeong, Dee Bradley Baker, Steven Yeun, Freida Pinto, and Ke Huy Quan. The story follows Aang and his friends as they discover Tagah, a surviving airbender, and join him in searching for an airbending staff to bring back the Air Nomads.

The film was announced in February 2021, along with the formation of Avatar Studios, a new division of Nickelodeon dedicated to the creation of projects set in the universe of the Avatar: The Last Airbender franchise. By June 2022, Montgomery was attached as director. Principal cast members were announced in the following years, with the main voice roles from the series being mostly recast in respect to character ethnic and racial backgrounds. Animation for the film was mainly handled at Flying Bark Productions, with Studio Mir and Studio Ppuri providing additional support, combining 2D hand-drawn animated characters with 3D computer-animated environments.

Originally slated to release in theaters worldwide, Avatar Aang: The Last Airbender premiered both at San Diego Comic-Con and two theaters in Los Angeles and New York as part of a limited engagement on July 24, 2026, and was released globally on Paramount+ on July 25. Before release, the entire film was leaked online, prompting staff members of the project to condemn the leaker's actions, while fans advocated for Paramount to revert to their theatrical release plan. The film received generally favorable reviews from critics, who praised the animation but criticized the overall narrative.

== Plot ==
Thirteen years after the end of the Hundred Year War, (Note: As depicted in the Avatar: The Last Airbender finale "Sozin's Comet" (2008)) Avatar Aang and his friends further establish Republic City as a home for people of all nations, causing Aang to increasingly mourn the absence of his own people. While visiting the desolate Southern Air Temple, Aang is ambushed by the Denied, a group of non-bending outlaws. Aang repels their attack, but the Denied steal a map connected to an unknown airbender Avatar named Sonam.

Aang travels to Republic City to warn his longtime girlfriend and sitting Council Representative, Katara. Aang also consults his past lives and learns that Sonam was a forgotten Avatar whose staff could channel the energy of the Spirit World and grant others airbending. Aang believes the Denied seek the staff and leaves Katara to gather their friends—Sokka, Toph, and Fire Lord Zuko—and meet him at the staff's last known location atop Mount Baihu.

At the top of the mountain, Aang discovers the frozen body of an airbender. The group rescues him and learns he is Tagah, an ancient follower of Sonam. Tagah persuades them to accompany him to a hidden island surrounded by a cyclone where the staff is said to rest. Aang hopes to use the staff to restore the Air Nomads. Although Tagah shares this vision, he expresses resentment toward the other bending nations. While they travel to the island, the Denied launch a surprise attack on their airship. Tagah retaliates and nearly kills the Denied, but is stopped by Aang. Aang and Tagah airbend a path through the storm as the rest of the group work to keep the airship flying. Noting Tagah's ruthless methods and the danger of their mission, Katara pleads with Aang to abandon the mission, but he prioritizes his desire for the staff over the safety of his friends.

On the island, Aang retrieves the staff by wielding all four elements. Tagah tries to follow, but is stopped and confronted by Katara. Tagah reveals his true intentions by killing the group—including Aang—and stealing the staff to restore what he believes to be Air Nomad supremacy. Landing in a pool of spirit water, Katara revives herself and then the others. Before he is saved, Aang sees Sonam's spirit and learns that Tagah betrayed her too. Tagah was traumatized by a brutal war and he stole her staff to seek vengeance against non-airbenders. Sonam imprisoned him atop the mountain and hid the staff for a future Avatar; she urges Aang to recover the staff and bring the world in balance.

The group pursues Tagah through the Spirit World to Republic City. They find the city under attack by the Denied, whom Tagah granted airbending through the staff. While his friends battle the Denied, Aang confronts Tagah and reclaims the staff. Aang succumbs to a corrupted Avatar State after becoming enraged by Tagah's accusations that he failed to protect the Air Nomads. Childhood memories of Monk Gyatso and his teachings influence Aang to spare Tagah. He instead destroys Sonam's staff, which strips the Denied of their airbending and causes Tagah to fade away. Before he disappears, Aang tells Tagah that they both must forgive themselves for failing to save their people.

In the aftermath, Aang oversees construction of a new Air Temple on an island near Republic City. (Note: As depicted in The Legend of Korra (2012–2014)) Speaking with Sonam's spirit, he concludes that the true power of the Air Nomads is their values, which can be passed on to future generations. Afterwards, Aang and his friends welcome a new group of Air Acolytes, including a reformed member of the Denied. Together, they discover a surviving herd of sky bison, which strengthens Aang's hope for the future of his culture.

== Voice cast ==
- Eric Nam as Avatar Aang, the last living Air Nomad of the Southern Air Temple and the current Avatar. He was kept unnaturally alive in an iceberg for a century and is now chronologically 125 years old. He was originally voiced by Zach Tyler Eisen as a child.
  - Sander Argabrite as younger Aang
- Dave Bautista as Tagah, an ancient airbender from Avatar Sonam's time who remained frozen in ice for approximately 5,000 years, much like Aang himself.
- Jessica Matten as Katara, a Southern Water Tribe waterbender. She is Sokka's younger sister and Aang's girlfriend who taught him waterbending. She was originally voiced by Mae Whitman.
- Román Zaragoza as Sokka, a Southern Water Tribe warrior, strategist, and Katara's older brother. He was originally voiced by Jack DeSena.
- Dionne Quan as Toph Beifong, a blind earthbender who can "see" by sensing vibrations in the ground. She was Aang's earthbending teacher during the Hundred-Year War and now runs a metalbending academy. She was originally voiced by Michaela Jill Murphy.
- Steven Yeun as Fire Lord Zuko, the current ruler of the Fire Nation and a former enemy-turned-ally of Aang who taught him firebending to help defeat his father, Fire Lord Ozai as he was succeeded by his own son. He was originally voiced by Dante Basco.
- Taika Waititi as the Gorillavark, a spirit who helps Team Avatar escape from the Spirit World and get to Republic City.
- Geraldine Viswanathan as Kallik, a member of the Denied who has a change of heart and becomes an Air Acolyte.
- Ronny Chieng as a Fire Nation messenger.
- Ken Jeong as the Cabbage Merchant, an unlucky Vegetable salesman from the Earth Kingdom who occasionally crossed paths with Team Avatar in the past. He was originally voiced by James Sie.
- Dee Bradley Baker as Appa and Momo, Aang's pet flying sky bison, and lemur. Baker is the sole actor from the original series to reprise his roles.
- Freida Pinto as Avatar Sonam, an Avatar from the distant past of the Air Nomads. She was the original owner of an ancient staff during a golden age of airbenders in the city of Jharana.
- Ke Huy Quan as Avatar Xian, an Avatar from the Earth Kingdom and a gifted scholar. He is the only one of Aang's past lives who knows who Sonam was and the power of her staff.

Other cast members for the film include Peta Sergeant as Jie, the leader of the Denied, Jonathan Ohye and Vic Chao as Yuddah and Hong, members of the Denied under Jie, François Chau, who portrayed the Great Sage in the live-action Netflix series, as Monk Gyatso, an Air Nomad Monk and Aang's mentor and father figure who was originally voiced by Sab Shimono, Tim Dang, who previously voiced Yon Rha of the Southern Raiders, as the Grand Chamberlain of the Fire Nation, and Keone Young, who previously voiced Jeong Jeong, as Roku, Aang's spirit guide and predecessor of the Avatar mantle who was originally voiced by James Garrett.

== Production ==
=== Background and development ===
In 2018, Netflix announced that a live-action remake of the original Avatar: The Last Airbender (2005–2008) was to start production in 2019. The series' original creators, Michael Dante DiMartino and Bryan Konietzko, were initially announced to be the executive producers and showrunners. In June 2020, the creators departed the series due to creative differences. That same year, Nickelodeon licensed the original The Last Airbender as well as The Legend of Korra (2012–14) to Netflix, which led to a boom in popularity for both series. This success convinced Nickelodeon to rekindle their relationship with Konietzko and DiMartino and explore further opportunities.

In February 2021, ViacomCBS announced during its annual Investor Day the formation of Avatar Studios, a new division of Nickelodeon dedicated to the creation of projects based on animated television series Avatar: The Last Airbender and The Legend of Korra. The series creators and executive producers Konietzko and DiMartino would serve as co-chief creative officers. It was also announced that the first project of the studio is an animated theatrical film that would begin production later in 2021. Original series executive producer Eric Coleman takes executive producer credit, with Bryan Konietzko, Michael Dante DiMartino, Latifa Ouaou, and Maryann Garger as the film's producers.

In June 2022, it was announced that Lauren Montgomery, who was a storyboard artist on the original series and a supervising producer for Korra, would serve as director. In July 2022, Janet Varney, the voice of Korra, revealed that the plot of the film would revolve around the original series' characters. A sneak peek of the film was revealed at Paramount Pictures' CinemaCon presentation in April 2023, confirming that the film would follow the characters in their young adulthood. In April 2024, it was reported that William Mata would serve as co-director, alongside Montgomery. In April 2025, the title of the film was announced as The Legend of Aang: The Last Airbender.

In March 2026, Montgomery revealed that production had wrapped and the final cut of the film had been screened for the entire cast and crew. Posts from the screening by Eric Nam and Román Zaragoza revealed that the film had been retitled Avatar Aang: The Last Airbender. The next month, it was reported that the film's budget cost US$80 million.

=== Casting ===
In May 2023, Mae Whitman, the original voice actress for Katara, confirmed that she would not be reprising the role. She remarked that despite cherishing her experience, Whitman was excited to see "actors come in, who honestly fit the role much better" as she expressed an interest to have an actress who isn't white succeed her. The following year, at CinemaCon in April 2024, Paramount announced the casting of Eric Nam as Aang, Dionne Quan as Toph Beifong, Jessica Matten as Katara, Román Zaragoza as Sokka, and Dave Bautista as the antagonist. In March 2025, Variety reported that Steven Yeun, who had previously voiced Avatar Wan in The Legend of Korra, joined the cast in an undisclosed role. He was later confirmed to be voicing Zuko four months later, succeeding the character's original voice actor Dante Basco. Later that December, more additional actors were announced to join the film, consisting of Taika Waititi, Geraldine Viswanathan, Freida Pinto, Ke Huy Quan, Peta Sergeant, and Dee Bradley Baker. Baker was revealed to be reprising his roles as Appa and Momo from the original series.

According to the film's casting director, Jenny Jue, the decision to recast the principal characters was on behalf of DiMartino and Konietzko. This direction was influenced by the increased emphasis on matching voice actors' ethnic and racial backgrounds to those of the characters they portray, a topic that arose in the industry in the years following the conclusion of the original series. Jue said, "ATLA is a fictional world, but there are cultural influences for each nation/kingdom, and we wanted to explore the talent from those groups".

=== Animation ===
In October 2022, it was reported that the Australian studio Flying Bark Productions would primarily provide the animation for the film. In May 2025, it was reported that Studio Mir in South Korea which previously provided animation for The Legend of Korra, would also provide additional animation services for the film. Alexia Gates-Foale, director of production for Flying Bark, said that working on the film will be "a dream project" for the studio due to multiple employees being fans of the franchise. The animation style used in the feature combines 2D hand-drawn animated characters with computer-animated environments taking inspiration from the Deep Canvas technology. Pioneered at Walt Disney Animation Studios, Deep Canvas had extensively been used in titles such as Tarzan (1999) and Treasure Planet (2002).

=== Music ===
Jeremy Zuckerman, who composed for the animated series, was revealed to be serving as the film's composer in November 2025. Zuckerman said that he was granted full access to an orchestra, stating that the bigger budget for the film enables him to try new things he could not do on the television series due to technological limits at the time. The soundtrack was released on the day of the film's San Diego Comic-Con premiere on July 24.

== Release ==
Avatar Aang: The Last Airbender was released on Paramount+ on July 25, 2026. It was originally set to be released theatrically by Paramount Pictures on October 9, 2026. The film was previously expected to release on October 10, 2025, then was delayed to January 30, 2026, and then was delayed again to October 9, 2026, before the theatrical release was canceled and moved to Paramount+. While there was originally no confirmation of the film's streaming date, Montgomery revealed in March 2026 that the film would still release in October. According to Animation Magazine, "unspecified delays in physical animation production" led to the second release date push. On July 15, it was announced that the film will have a limited theatrical run in two theaters located in Los Angeles and New York from July 24 to July 30 in order to qualify the film for potential Oscars shortlist consideration.

=== Home media ===
Avatar Aang: The Last Airbender released on Blu-ray and DVD on November 3, 2026, with a 4K Ultra HD Blu-ray steelbook scheduled for February 9, 2027 by Paramount Home Entertainment.

=== Online leak ===
We worked on the Aang movie for years with the expectation that we'd get to celebrate all our hard work in theaters... Just to see people unceremoniously leak the film and pass our shots around Twitter like candy... This is incredibly disrespectful to all of the hard work the artists put in.

— Animator Julia Schoel

On April 12, 2026, portions of the film were leaked on X, with the leaker claiming that Nickelodeon accidentally emailed him the film. The leak revealed Dave Bautista and Taika Waititi's characters in the film, as well as Team Avatar being together. On April 13, reports emerged that the full film had leaked online in high quality. Following the leak, many fans and commentators used the positive reception of the footage to advocate for a reversal of the decision to not show the film in cinemas, arguing the "cinematic" quality of the animation warranted a big-screen release. However, the leak drew sharp condemnation from the film's production staff and animators, who argued that the unauthorized release disrespected years of professional labor and undermined the project's official launch. Animator Julia Schoel and artist Tom Barkel criticized the leak as "disrespectful", with Barkel noting that bypassing official releases could jeopardize future work for artists in a "hostile industry". Other crew members, including Henry Thurlow, Ilkwang Kim, and Tessa Bright, expressed that the leak robbed the creators of the professional milestone of a formal premiere and urged fans to wait for the official release to support the artists' efforts.

By April 16, an internal investigation by Paramount concluded that the leak was not caused by a vulnerability in their own systems, though the film was widely mirrored across the Internet despite copyright takedown efforts. The incident drew comparisons to a 2017 breach of Netflix's Orange Is the New Black and the leak of the 2009 film X-Men Origins: Wolverine, as it represented a major title being compromised months in advance. Michaela Jill Murphy, the original voice actress for Toph Beifong, condemned the leak by posting a message on social media to urge fans not to share art or clips of the film. During a panel at Supanova Expo that same week, Murphy expressed support for the film being officially released in theaters based on words of encouragement by co-star Olivia Hack, the voice actress for Ty Lee. The following week, on April 24, a 26-year-old man, identified as the person responsible for the leak of the film, was arrested in Singapore for accessing a media server without authorization. If convicted, he could face up to 7 years in prison, a fine of up to $50,000, or both.

== Reception ==
=== Critical response ===
On the review aggregation website Rotten Tomatoes, 90% of 48 critics' reviews are positive, with an average rating of 7.3/10. The website's consensus reads, "Avatar Aang is a glowing continuation of The Last Airbender series, giving audiences an audacious update to their favorite characters while being technically proficient and visually captivating." Metacritic, which uses a weighted average, assigned the film a score of 68 out of 100, based on 13 critics, indicating "generally favorable" reviews.

Wilson Chapman of IndieWire gave the film a C+ grade, calling it a "visually stunning work of animation, and one loaded with enough callbacks and references to the original that it will probably satisfy the show's very devoted fanbase," though criticized the film's decision to age up the characters, saying it "loses touch with the charm that made the original show so beloved in the first place." TheWrap's William Bibbiani gave the film a positive review, saying "it's powerful stuff, and fans of the series will take away additional nuance, since we know what Aang's decisions lead to, for better and worse," also noting that others "will find the film dazzling visually but undercooked in other ways." In a negative review, Frank Scheck of The Hollywood Reporter wrote: "Some heavy themes are also injected into the mix, such as the corruptive effects of power. But mostly the film seems content to wow you with its visuals, feeling rushed in its narrative and lurching from one violent episode to another."

Rend Jones of RogerEbert.com gave the film three out of four, saying it "justifies [the] theatrical experience", and added: "Considering that "Aang" is the first in a long line of "Avatar" productions, the debut venture for Avatar Studios makes a rock-solid mark that one can only hope gets sturdier in future entries. Nevertheless, it delivers a gratifying cinematic experience to the fanbase, as visually mesmerizing as it is a worthy storytelling contribution to a brilliant fantasy series." Joshua Rivera of The A.V. Club gave the film a C grade, writing: "For longtime fans, it is a generous gesture, a pleasurable reassurance that the creative voices stewarding these characters have not lost a beat and kept this world exactly as you remember it," while also saying that, "[a]fter suffering so many indignities, the embattled film turns out to be entirely inconsequential." Jesse Hassenger of The Guardian gave the film three out of five, calling it an "engaging TV-to-movie adventure", and noted: "If Avatar Aang is meant to serve as a proof of concept that this world can work on the big screen, consider that mission finally accomplished."

=== Accolades ===
Award	Date of ceremony	Category	Recipient(s)	Result	Ref.
Nickelodeon Kids' Choice Awards	November 14, 2026	Favorite Animated Movie	Avatar Aang: The Last Airbender	Nominated	
