= Eric Coleman (producer) =

American television producer

- Born: February 24, 1968 (age 58)
- Occupation: Producer at Paramount Pictures
- Years active: 1992–present

Eric Coleman (born February 24, 1968) is an American producer for television and film. From 2008 to 2019, he was the senior vice president of Disney Television Animation (owned by The Walt Disney Company). He currently is a producer at Paramount Pictures.

== Biography ==
Coleman enrolled in Duke University, where he majored in English literature. In his junior year, he stayed for six months in Florence, Italy, to absorb himself in art; in London, he stayed another six months for his literature studies. After he graduated with a baccalaureate, Coleman continued to travel, moving from Southeast Asia to Australia, while staying in Nepal and New Zealand. Wanting to work in a creative industry after he returned to the United States, Coleman sat in on a job fair, where he networked with and took advice from those in the field, including an executive of MTV. Afterward, Coleman got a job as an assistant to the vice president of animation at Nickelodeon. At their animation studio, he worked from 1992 to 1993 on The Ren & Stimpy Show and Rugrats. His liking of animation came from the way it combines "so many art forms", he said, among which are "painting and graphic design, writing, music and acting".

Nickelodeon promoted Coleman to manager of development from 1995 to 1997, before serving as coordinator of current series since 1993. For the network, he helped develop SpongeBob SquarePants, on which he found that the qualities of a character in a show are more important than its concept. Coleman also learned that taking risks "if the fundamentals are solid but it just seems unusual or uncertain" is necessary in taking pitches. Later, he became executive in charge of production from 1997 to 2003, and vice president of animation development and production from 2003 to 2008. Among the most popular shows on the network he had supervised include SquarePants and Avatar: The Last Airbender. In 2007, he was conominated for a Primetime Emmy Award for the latter show.

By then a veteran of Nickelodeon, Coleman left the network to work for Disney Television Animation, where he was hired as senior vice president of the studio on February 4, 2008, replacing Meredith Roberts, who moved to DisneyToon Studios to serve as its general manager and senior vice president. Coleman described the vision of his studio as "looking for people who can create specific and authentic characters". In 2010, he approved Gravity Falls, created by Alex Hirsch, as a series on Disney Channel, as well as a second season of Fish Hooks. On the network, he helped develop Star vs. the Forces of Evil, Penn Zero: Part-Time Hero, Milo Murphy's Law, DuckTales, Big City Greens, Amphibia, and The Owl House before leaving in 2019 to go back to Paramount Pictures as a producer.
