= Jeremy Zuckerman =

American composer (born 1975)

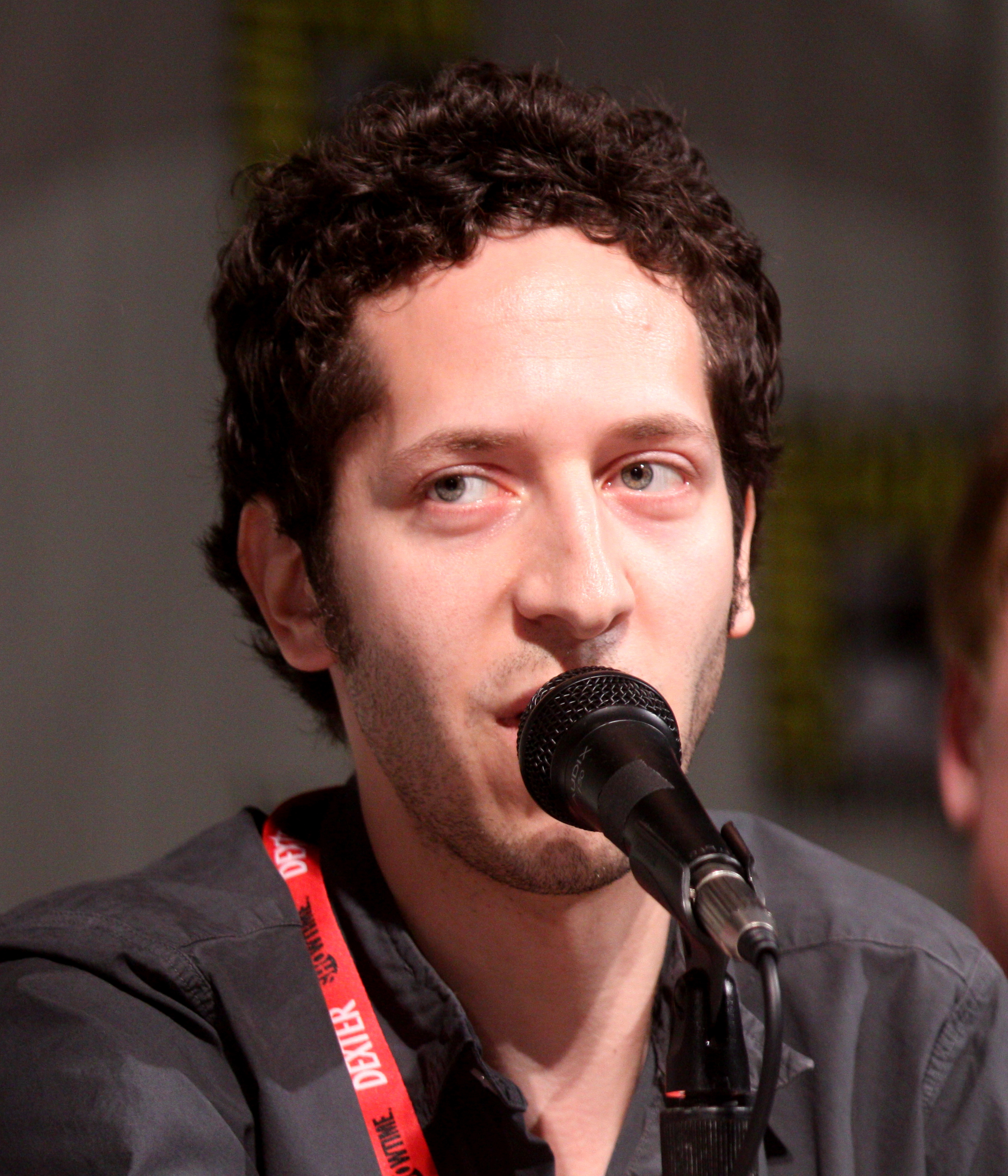
- Zuckerman at San Diego Comic-Con in 2011
- Born: July 31, 1975 (age 51); Newburgh, New York, U.S.
- Education: Berklee College of Music; California Institute of the Arts
- Occupations: Composer; musician
- Years active: 2001–present
- Notable work: Avatar: The Last Airbender; The Legend of Korra
- Website: jeremyzuckerman.com

Jeremy Zuckerman (born July 31, 1975) is an American composer of concert music, film and television music, music for modern dance, and experimental music. He is best known as the composer for the animated series Avatar: The Last Airbender, its sequel series The Legend of Korra, as well as other entries in the series' franchise.

== Education ==
At age five, Zuckerman began learning piano with his mother as his teacher. As a teenager and into his early 20s, he played guitar and synthesizer in heavy metal and coldwave bands. Zuckerman studied jazz and computer music at the Berklee College of Music, where he earned a bachelor's degree. He earned a master's degree at the California Institute of the Arts, where he studied modern composition with a focus on computer music and sonic art with Morton Subotnick, Mark Trayle, and Tom Erbe.

== Career ==
=== Film/TV ===
Zuckerman began his career as a television/film composer as one half of The Track Team, a music and sound design company based in Los Angeles. He started The Track Team in 2004 with co-founder Benjamin Wynn (a.k.a. Deru). Zuckerman created the music for the critically acclaimed Nickelodeon television series, Avatar: The Last Airbender, which won a Peabody Award in 2008. Zuckerman also solo composed the music for the Avatar sequel series, The Legend of Korra,Seven Havens, and for the Paramount+ feature film Avatar Aang: The Last Airbender. His score is also featured in DC's The Spectre, Jonah Hex, Green Arrow, and Superman/Shazam!: The Return of Black Adam, all of which were collaborations with the Joaquim Dos Santos, one of episode directors of Avatar: The Last Airbender.

Together, Zuckerman and Wynn composed the music for another Nickelodeon TV series Kung Fu Panda: Legends of Awesomeness, the work on which earned them four Daytime Emmy Award nominations and two wins. They also collaborated for indie feature films Just Peck and A Leading Man.

In 2017, Zuckerman and Wynn announced the dissolution of The Track Team to pursue their creative and professional paths independently.

Zuckerman went on to score the first three seasons of MTV and VH1's Scream, as well as the PBS documentaries Nature: Snow Monkeys and Nature: Yosemite. Other documentaries include Beartrek, Stuntman, and This Little Land of Mines.

His other notable film and TV projects include the 2020 Jeff Baena film Horse Girl, and an episode of the experimental Showtime series Cinema Toast; both of them are collaborations between Zuckerman and Josiah Steinbrick. The Cinema Toast episode, titled "Quiet Illness", is written by Aubrey Plaza, and is her directorial debut.

Zuckerman has also composed the music for director Natasha Kermani's films Lucky and V/H/S/85.

=== The Echo Society/Concert music ===
Zuckerman is a founding member of The Echo Society, a Los Angeles-based collective whose mission is to gather, inspire, enrich and connect the community through the creation and performance of new sonic and visual art. The Echo Society's other founding members include composers Brendan Angelides (a.k.a. Eskmo), Judson Crane, Nathan Johnson, Rob Simonsen, Joseph Trapanese, and Benjamin Wynn.

Zuckerman's music for The Echo Society concert series is predominantly chamber music, and the work "focuses on creating highly specific and controlled masses of sound using a combination of home-grown, semi-algorithmic processes and intuition. Using traditional orchestral instruments, these works explore complexity and transformation of sound and form, instead of the traditional melody/harmony paradigm."

The Echo Society's most well-known project in which Zuckerman was a part of was composing the score to the Darren Aronofsky's 2023 film Postcard from Earth, which also became the first film to be created for and presented at Sphere in Las Vegas.

=== Modern dance ===
Zuckerman has worked with choreographer Benjamin Levy on Everyone, Intimate, Alone, Visibly, "in which extended vocal techniques performed and processed in real-time by Jeremy, intersect with Levy’s choreography to form a complex gestural dialog." He also worked with Levy on Khaos, which was commissioned by the Scottish Dance Theatre. Zuckerman created the score for dancer/choreographer Lisa Wahlander's The Impermanent Sky, which was composed and performed live by Zuckerman using the audio programming language SuperCollider.

=== Theatre ===
Zuckerman composed the music to playwright Juli Crockett's theatre pieces [or, the whale], a spoken word opera which debuted in Los Angeles in 2001, and Orpheus Crawling, an experimental opera which premiered in 2007 at the New Original Works (NOW) Fest at REDCAT.

=== Discography ===
- Avatar: Seven Havens - Book 1: Survival (Music From The Animated Series) (2026)
- Avatar Aang: The Last Airbender (Music From The Motion Picture) (2026)
- Avatar: The Last Airbender - Book 3: Fire (Music From The Animated Series) (2026)
- Avatar: The Last Airbender – Book 2: Earth (Music From The Animated Series) (2025)
- Avatar: The Last Airbender – Book 1: Water (Music From The Animated Series) (2023)
- Lucky (Original Motion Picture Soundtrack) (2021)
- This Little Land of Mines (Original Motion Picture Soundtrack) (2019)
- Beartrek (Original Motion Picture Soundtrack) (2019)
- Yosemite (From PBS’s "Nature") [Original Television Soundtrack] (2019)
- Snow Monkeys (From PBS’s "Nature") [Original Television Soundtrack] (2019)
- Scream: The TV Series Seasons 1 & 2 (Original Television Soundtrack) (2016)
- Khaos (2016) - dance score
- The Legend of Korra (Original Music from Book One) (2013)
- A Leading Man (Original Score) (2013 - with Benjamin Wynn)
- DC Showcase: Superman / Shazam! The Return of Black Adam (2011 - with Benjamin Wynn) - score soundtrack
- Egantic (2010) - Ginormous remix album. Tracks 1 and 4
- Diamond Dave (2003) - David Lee Roth album. Credits include: guitar, accordion, Fender Rhodes piano, Hammond B-3 organ, percussion, programming, engineer, producer, digital editing, sound design
- The Trailer Park Singles EP (2016) - Tommy MV$ERVTI extended play. Co-production (sampling) on track 1

=== Awards/Achievements ===
- 2019 Doc LA Film Festival (won) - Best Composer (tie) for This little Land of Mines
- 2018 News & Documentary Emmy Awards (nominated) - Outstanding Music and Sound for Nature: Yosemite
- 2017 Daytime Emmy Awards (nominated) - Outstanding Sound Editing (Music) for Kung Fu Panda: Legends of Awesomeness
- 2015 Daytime Emmy Awards (won) - Outstanding Sound Editing (Music) for Kung Fu Panda: Legends of Awesomeness
- 2015 News & Documentary Emmy Awards (nominated) - Outstanding Individual Achievement in a Craft: Music and Sound for Nature: Snow Monkeys
- 2014 Daytime Emmy Awards (nominated) - Outstanding Sound Editing (Music) for Kung Fu Panda: Legends of Awesomeness
- 2014 Playfest (Malaga, Spain) - Featured composer. Avatar: The Last Airbender and The Legend of Korra suites performed by orchestra and choir
- 2013 Daytime Emmy Awards (nominated) - Outstanding Sound Editing (Music) for Kung Fu Panda: Legends of Awesomeness
- 2013 GoldSpirit Awards (nominated) - Best TV Soundtrack for Legend of Korra (Original Music from Book One)
- 2012 Daytime Emmy Awards (won) - Outstanding Sound Editing (Music) for Kung Fu Panda: Legends of Awesomeness
- 2011 Motion Picture Sound Editors, USA (nominated) - Best Sound Editing for DC Showcase: Jonah Hex
- 2009 Motion Picture Sound Editors, USA (nominated) - Best Sound Editing for Avatar: The Last Airbender

== See also ==
- List of soundtrack composers
