= Zuko Alone =

- Avatar: The Last Airbender episode
- Zuko protects the village from the Earth Kingdom soldiers.
- Episode no.: Season 2 Episode 7
- Directed by: Lauren MacMullan
- Written by: Elizabeth Welch
- Story by: Michael Dante DiMartino; Bryan Konietzko
- Original air date: May 12, 2006
- Running time: 25 minutes

Guest appearances
- Jen Cohn as Ursa; Gary Sturgis as Gow; Elijah Runcorn as young Zuko; Walker Edmiston as Azulon; Susan Eisenberg as Sela; Brian O'Neill as Gansu; Robby Bruce as Lee

Episode chronology
← Previous "The Blind Bandit"	Next → "The Chase"
- Avatar: The Last Airbender (season 2)

"Zuko Alone" is the seventh episode of the second season of the American animated television series Avatar: The Last Airbender, and the 27th episode overall. Written by Elizabeth Welch and directed by Lauren MacMullan, it aired in the United States on Nickelodeon on May 12, 2006. The only episode in the series to not feature Zach Tyler Eisen as series protagonist Aang, it follows Zuko as he comes across an Earth Kingdom village and meets a family whose eldest son is in the war. The episode also contains flashbacks to five years prior to the series' start showing how Zuko's father, Ozai, became Firelord.

The episode received critical acclaim and is regarded as one of Avatar: The Last Airbender's best.

== Plot ==
Zuko, weary and hungry after travelling alone, reaches an Earth Kingdom village. The Earth Kingdom soldiers assigned to protect the village use their power to get what they want. After Zuko takes the fall for a young boy named Lee, who threw an egg at the soldiers, Lee invites Zuko to his farm for dinner. Zuko learns from Lee's parents that their eldest son, Sensu, is fighting in the war, and that the town does not like the soldiers. That night, Lee sneaks Zuko's dual swords out into a field to practice with them. Zuko catches and trains him.

Five years earlier, Zuko and his mother Ursa receive a letter from Iroh stating that he has broken through the Outer Wall of Ba Sing Se. Iroh gifts Zuko an Earth Kingdom knife and Zuko's sister Azula an Earth Kingdom doll, which she sets ablaze. Azula points out to Zuko and Ursa that if Iroh dies, their father Ozai will become Fire Lord. The next morning, Ursa tells the two children that Iroh's son, Lu Ten, did not survive the siege.

Lu Ten's death causes Iroh to return home, being seen as a disgrace by Azula. Zuko and his family meet with Fire Lord Azulon, and Ozai argues that he should be the next Fire Lord instead of Iroh. Azulon orders Ozai to kill Zuko so that he may feel the pain of losing a son.

In the present, Lee learns from the Earth Kingdom soldiers that Sensu has been captured. Zuko gives Lee the knife Iroh gifted him before departing. Lee's mother seeks out Zuko's help after the Earth Kingdom soldiers take Lee for threatening them with the knife. Zuko rides back into town and faces down the soldiers using his swords. After Zuko defeats three of the soldiers, he is knocked unconscious by the final soldier and flashes back to the night he last saw his mother: Ursa tells him to "never forget who you are," before vanishing into the night. Zuko wakes up and uses Firebending to defeat the final soldier. He proclaims to the village that he is the son of Ursa and Fire Lord Ozai and heir to the throne, causing Lee and the town to turn against him. Seeing that he and Lee are no longer friends, Zuko decides to leave the town.

In the past, after Ursa's disappearance, Azulon is found dead (Note: In The Search comic series, it is revealed that Ursa was responsible for creating an untraceable poison used by Ozai to kill Fire Lord Azulon in order to protect Zuko from Azulon. Ozai, fearing that Ursa would one day use the same poison against him, banished Ursa from the palace the same night.) and Ozai succeeds him as Fire Lord.

== Credits ==
Dante Basco, Grey DeLisle and Mako are the only main cast members in this episode, making this the first episode is which Zach Tyler Eisen, Mae Whitman and Jack DeSena do not provide their voices as Aang, Katara and Sokka respectively. Guest actors in the episode include Jen Cohn as Ursa, Walker Edmiston as Azulon and Mark Hamill as Ozai. This is Edmiston's last role before his death in February 2007.

Lauren MacMullan directed this episode, having previously directed five episodes from Book One, "The Cave of Two Lovers" and "Avatar Day". Elizabeth Welch wrote the episode having previously written three prior episodes.

== Production ==
Ursa makes her first appearance in this episode, voiced by Jen Cohn. Cohn later returned for two more episodes, "The Earth King" and part three of the four-part series finale. Showrunners Michael Dante DiMartino and Bryan Konietzko made sure not to include the letter 'Z' in Ursa's name to distinguish her and her morals and beliefs from the rest of the Fire Nation royal family who all have a 'Z' in their name.

The Fire Lord's throne room is fully introduced in this episode after a glimpse of it was seen in "The Storm". DiMartino and Konietzko took inspiration from the facial features of a dragon. It is later revealed that dragons were the first firebenders. According to DiMartino and Konietzko, the final fight in the episode takes place at high noon, to emulate a western feeling, as most western standoffs take place around this time.

== Critical reception ==
Tony Ireland Mell of IGN gave this episode a rating of 9.1 out of 10 commenting: "This was a very deep episode that had many layers. The narrative was that of a prime time drama in which a boy lost must search to find himself." Hayden Childs of The A.V. Club praised the episode, in particular the journey Zuko takes through it writing "It's hard to talk about the realism in the magic world of the Avatar, but what 'Zuko Alone' exhibits is just this: realism. Zuko has always been one of the most realistic and compelling characters in Avatar, and this episode gives him meaningful backstory and a meaningful arc. It may have little to do with the main action of the show, but it has everything to do with the emotional growth of Zuko."

In March 2022, Screen Rant placed "Zuko Alone" as the fourth-best episode of the series – behind its three season finales – calling the episode "a heartbreaking tale of an anti-hero who's still a likable character in Avatar, as Zuko's issues continue to pile up." In 2020, The Harvard Crimson ranked "Zuko Alone" as the 40th best out of the total 61 episodes, and Entertainment Weekly ranked it as it second best of the show behind the four-part series finale.
