= The Avatar Returns =

- Avatar: The Last Airbender episode
- Episode no.: Season 1 Episode 2
- Directed by: Dave Filoni
- Written by: Michael Dante DiMartino; Bryan Konietzko
- Production code: 102
- Original air date: February 21, 2005
- Running time: 23 minutes

Guest appearances
- Melendy Britt as Gran Gran; Mako Iwamatsu as Iroh

Episode chronology
← Previous "The Boy in the Iceberg"	Next → "The Southern Air Temple"

"The Avatar Returns" is the second episode of the first season of the American animated television series Avatar: The Last Airbender. The episode was directed by Dave Filoni and was written by series creators Michael Dante DiMartino and Bryan Konietzko, with additional writing being done by Aaron Ehasz, Peter Goldfinger and Josh Stolberg. It originally aired on Nickelodeon on February 21, 2005, alongside the previous episode, "The Boy in the Iceberg".

== Plot ==
The episode picks up from the end of the previous episode with Aang and Katara returning to the village from the site of a shipwreck after accidentally triggering a flare alerting Zuko of their location. After an argument, Sokka decides to banish Aang from the village. Katara initially wanted to leave with Aang since Aang offered to take her to the Northern Water Tribe to find a waterbender to teach her. But Aang did not want to come between Katara and her family and she ended up staying. Aang and Appa then depart the village to head towards for the Southern Air Temple.

While Sokka gets prepared to defend his village, Aang and Appa rest on an ice formation before spotting Zuko's ship approaching the village. When Zuko's ship arrives at the village, it collapses the wall and towers. Sokka charges at Zuko but Zuko easily takes him down. Zuko then demands the location of the Avatar and grabs Gran Gran saying he would be around her age. Aang then arrives, knocking Zuko off his feet. Zuko in his shock at Aang's age, reveals that Aang is the Avatar. Aang surrenders himself to Zuko in exchange for leaving the village alone.

Later, Katara tries to convince Sokka that they need to rescue Aang, but Sokka was already prepared and had a canoe and supplies waiting. In the end, they end up taking Appa. Inside of Zuko's ship, Aang is being taken by two guards to his prison cell. Aang then uses air bending to blow a big gust of wind and defeating both of the guards. Aang then quickly jumps onto the deck and forces his way using airbending. He ends up in Zuko's personal quarters where they end up fighting and Zuko falls down defeated.

Aang and Zuko end up on the ship's deck where they begin to fight for a third time. Appa flies over with Katara and Sokka; Aang is then knocked unconscious into the water by Zuko's fire blasts. Aang then enters the Avatar state and flies himself back onto the ship. Appa lands down on the ship to get Aang and fly away. Zuko and Iroh then launch a combined fireball at Appa but Aang reflects the fireball with a wind burst knocking the fire ball onto the side of an iceberg. This causes the ice to collapse onto Zuko's ship, damaging it, and allowing the group to escape.

Katara questions why Aang hid that he was the Avatar, he admits that he never wanted to be. Accepting that he must learn to bend Water, Earth, and Fire respectively, the group sets out for the Northern Water Tribe.

== Credits ==
Main cast members Zach Tyler Eisen, Mae Whitman, Jack DeSena, Dante Basco and Dee Bradley Baker appear as the voices of Aang, Katara, Sokka, Zuko, and Appa respectively. Mako guest stars as Zuko's wise uncle Iroh, and Melendy Britt guest stars as Sokka and Katara's grandmother Kanna, who goes by the name of Gran Gran.

The episode was directed by Dave Filoni, who directed a total of eight episodes in the first season. The episode was written by series creators Michael Dante DiMartino and Bryan Konietzko, with additional writing by Aaron Ehasz, Peter Goldfinger and Josh Stolberg.

== Reception ==
The episode received positive reviews from critics. Tory Ireland Mell of IGN gave the episode a rating of 9.3 out of 10, commenting, "A very strong start for the series." Hayden Childs of The A.V. Club gave the episode an A− score praising the writing for introducing the characters well. Daniel Montesinos-Donaghy for Den of Geek loved the depictions of two different tribes preparing for battle but was annoyed by Katara at points.
