= Dave Filoni =

American film director (born 1974)

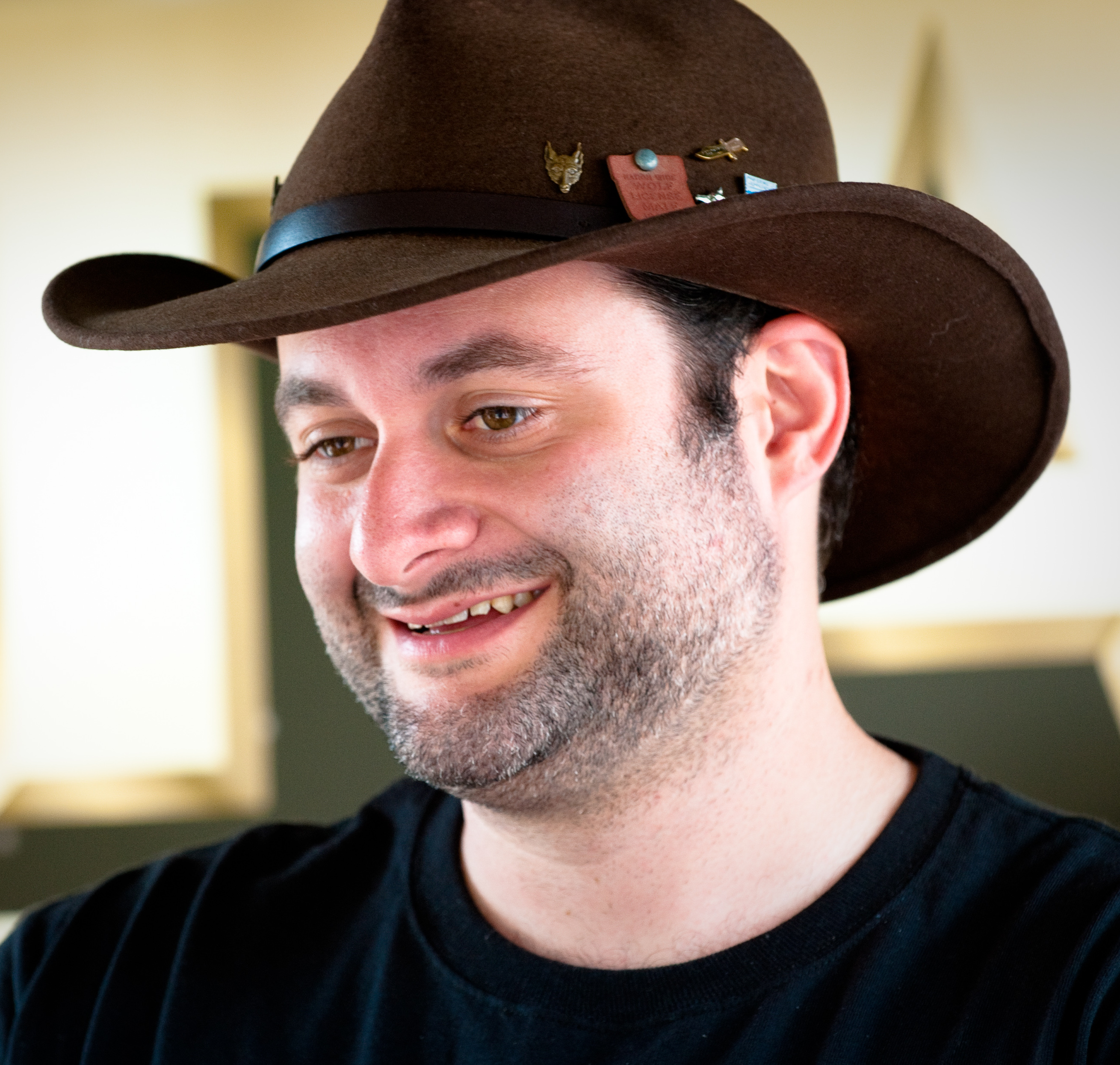
- Filoni in 2010
- Born: David Filoni; June 7, 1974 (age 52); Mt. Lebanon, Pennsylvania, U.S.
- Education: Edinboro University of Pennsylvania
- Occupations: Director; producer; writer; voice actor; animator
- Years active: 1997–present
- Employers: Film Roman; Disney; Nickelodeon; Lucasfilm (2005–present)
- Title: President and CCO of Lucasfilm
- Predecessor: Kathleen Kennedy as president
- Spouse: Anne Convery

David Filoni (born June 7, 1974) is an American filmmaker currently serving as the president and chief creative officer (CCO) of Lucasfilm. Widely considered the creative protégé of George Lucas, Filoni was personally hired and mentored by Lucas for nearly a decade. He is viewed as the "torchbearer" for Lucas's original vision of the Star Wars franchise, with Lucas having intended for Filoni to remain a central creative pillar following the studio's sale to The Walt Disney Company.

Filoni graduated from Edinboro University of Pennsylvania in 1996, earning a degree in animation. His early career included work as a director and storyboard artist on the first season of Nickelodeon's Avatar: The Last Airbender, which caught the attention of George Lucas. In 2005, Lucas recruited Filoni to Lucasfilm Animation to help build the studio and develop Star Wars: The Clone Wars, an Emmy Award-winning animated series (2008–2020) that he co-created, directed, wrote, and executive produced across seven seasons and over 100 episodes.

Filoni's influence grew with subsequent Star Wars projects, he later created the follow-up series The Bad Batch, Tales of the Jedi, Star Wars Rebels, Star Wars Resistance, executive producer on Star Wars Forces of Destiny, Skeleton Crew, and Maul – Shadow Lord, co-created and is an executive producer on The Mandalorian, The Book of Boba Fett, and Ahsoka, serving as the latter's sole writer. In 2023, Filoni was promoted to Chief Creative Officer of Lucasfilm, granting him creative oversight over all upcoming films and television projects in the franchise. In January 2026, Filoni was announced as president of Lucasfilm, alongside co-president Lynwen Brennan, taking over from Kathleen Kennedy. (Note: Attributed to multiple references:)

== Early life and education ==
Filoni was born in Mt. Lebanon, Pennsylvania, a suburb of Pittsburgh, on June 7, 1974. Filoni graduated from Mt. Lebanon High School in 1992 and Edinboro University of Pennsylvania in 1996, earning a degree in animation. Filoni's father was an opera and a classical music fan, according to composer Kevin Kiner, who did most of the music for The Clone Wars and Rebels. As such, he inherited appreciation for classical music and helped with the collaboration process, with Kiner crediting Filoni for suggesting the organ in Grand Admiral Thrawn's theme from Rebels.

== Career ==
=== Early career ===
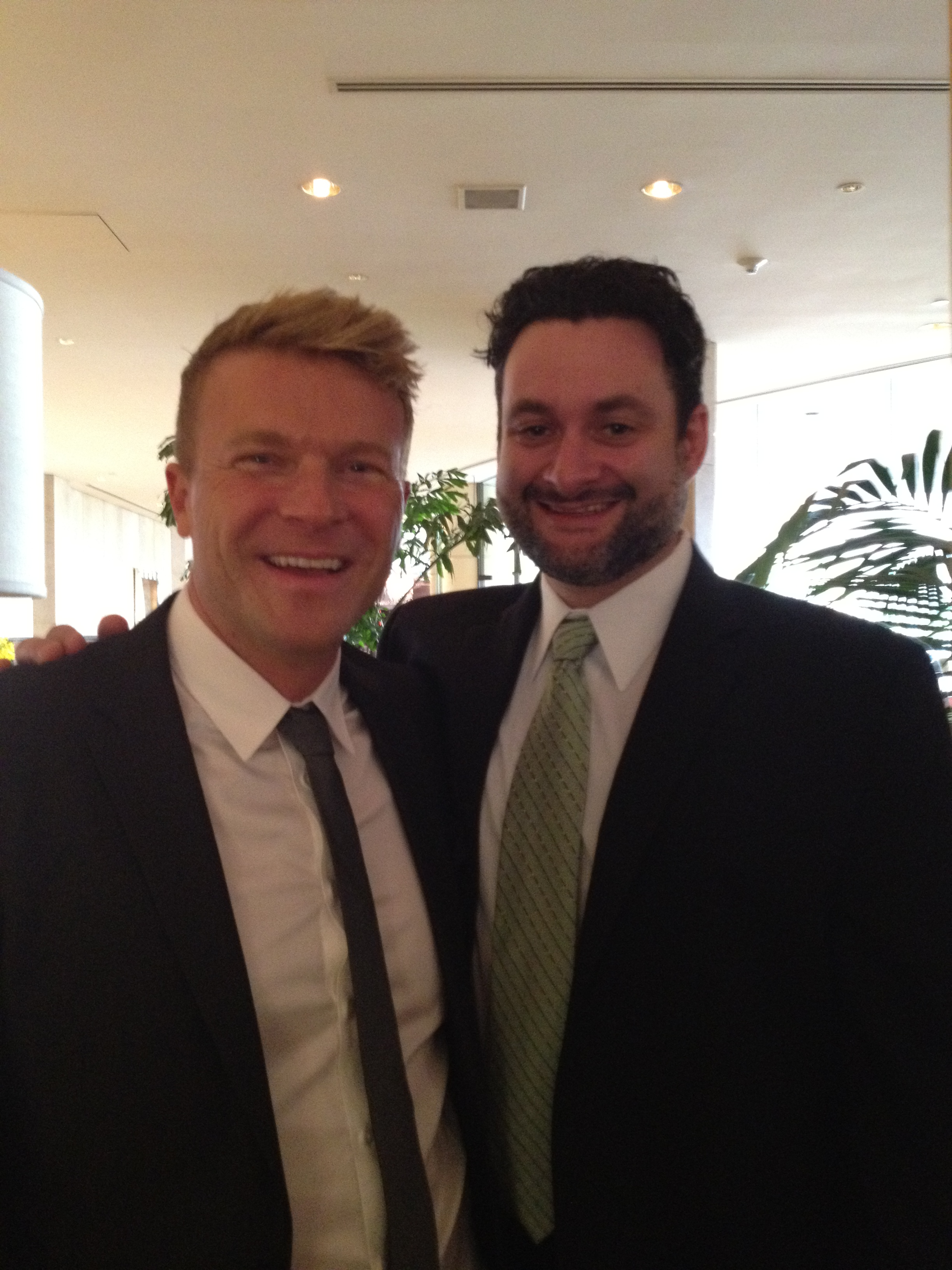
Dave Filoni with Christian Taylor at the Emmys

Prior to his work with Lucasfilm Animation, Filoni worked as a storyboard artist and/or assistant director for various animated series, including Mike Judge's King of the Hill and Disney Television Animation shows such as Teamo Supremo, Kim Possible, and Lilo & Stitch: The Series.

=== Avatar: The Last Airbender ===
Before the creation of Avatar: The Last Airbender, Dave Filoni introduced co-creators Bryan Konietzko and Michael Dante DiMartino to Hayao Miyazaki's film Princess Mononoke. Konietzko later described this as an "awakening and a turning point" in his own view of anime; he had previously perceived the medium overall as "misogynistic" and gratuitously violent before Filoni's introduction to Miyazaki's work. Which inspired Konietzko to work in animation in the first place, fundamentally changing his view of animation's directly inspiring him to pursue a more ambitious, dramatic project, such as Avatar: The Last Airbender.

Filoni was subsequently hired as a director and storyboard artist for the series, directing 8 of season one's 20 episodes, including the series premiere "The Boy in the Iceberg", and the season finale Part 2 of the "The Siege of the North" arc, marking a significant step in his career. (Note: Dave Filoni directed and contributed to storyboarding the following season-one episodes: "The Boy in the Iceberg": "The Avatar Returns": "Imprisoned": "Jet": "The Blue Spirit": "The Fortuneteller": "The Northern Air Temple": "The Siege of the North, Part 2":) His work on Avatar established him as a talented director and led directly to his recruitment by George Lucas. Filoni initially believed the job offer was a prank call from his colleagues at Nickelodeon, who often teased him about his well-known enthusiasm for Star Wars.

=== Lucasfilm and Star Wars ===
==== Early work and The Clone Wars ====
An avid Star Wars fan, particularly of character Plo Koon, Filoni dressed up as the Jedi Master for the opening of Revenge of the Sith. Filoni left Nickelodeon after George Lucas offered him a job, helping him develop a Star Wars animated series. While on The Star Wars Show, Filoni revealed that he originally believed he was being pranked when given the Star Wars job.

Filoni's office, as seen in the extra features on the Star Wars: The Clone Wars DVD, is filled with Plo Koon paraphernalia. He has a bust of Plo Koon's head, a model of Plo Koon's ship, an autographed portrait by the actor who played Plo Koon, a replica of Plo Koon's lightsaber on his desk, and his personal Plo Koon costume on display. Filoni also has a notebook-sized planner on his desk with Plo Koon's picture taped to the outside, and he has written the words "Plo Kool" on concept art designs for the Clone Wars, indicating that he liked those designs. Filoni also has a small model of the character Appa on his desk, from Avatar: The Last Airbender. Filoni has attended all the Clone Wars premieres and attended the fifth-season premiere in Orlando, Florida during the special event Celebration VI on August 24, 2012. He is most associated with developing the characters of Ahsoka Tano and Captain Rex.

==== Directing & producing ====
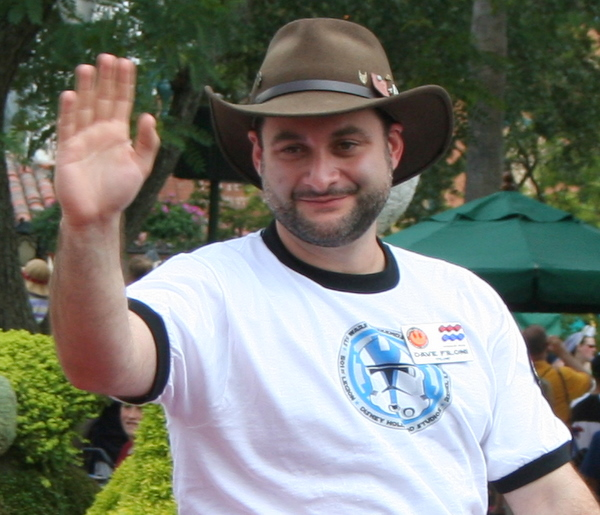
Filoni at Star Wars Weekend in 2009

In 2008, he served as director of the Star Wars: The Clone Wars animated feature film, and the supervising director of the Star Wars: The Clone Wars animated series.

Filoni made an appearance at Celebration IV in May 2007 with producer Catherine Winder to discuss the beginnings of the new television series and reveal how The Clone Wars was being created. At the time, he announced he would be writing for the Clone Wars monthly comic. Filoni voices the bounty hunter Embo during various episodes in different seasons. In February 2009, Filoni was inducted as an Honorary Member of the 501st Legion international costuming organization in recognition of his contributions to the continuing Star Wars saga.

==== Rebels ====
Filoni was as an executive producer of Star Wars Rebels, which debuted in fall 2014, alongside Greg Weisman and Simon Kinberg. For the first two seasons, he also served as its supervising director. He appointed Justin Ridge as his successor for the remainder of the show, though he still remained as executive producer. Filoni departed as supervising director in September 2016 when he was given the job as overseer of all future and current Lucasfilm Animation projects. He returned as supervising director for season four. Throughout the show's run, Filoni also voiced the astromech droid Chopper.

==== Live-action shows ====
In 2019, Jon Favreau invited Filoni to work with him to create The Mandalorian, a live-action Star Wars television series that premiered on Disney+ in November 2019. Referred to as a "Lucas encyclopedia", he contributes to and consults on many aspects of the series' production and began influencing the direction of the story in season two. He is an executive producer of the show and made his live-action debut as the director of episode one of the first season. Filoni has also been involved as executive producer of other Star Wars interconnected shows, The Book of Boba Fett, Ahsoka and Skeleton Crew. In April 2023, it was announced that Filoni would write and direct a Star Wars film, closing out these interconnected stories with a focus on the New Republic.

==== Promotion ====
In mid-2020, Lucasfilm quietly promoted Filoni as executive producer and executive creative director for the studio. His promotion was not announced to the public until Lucasfilm updated its list of executives on its website with the addition of Filoni in May 2021.

In November 2023, Filoni announced that he was promoted to chief creative officer at Lucasfilm, granting him creative oversight over all upcoming films and television projects in the Star Wars franchise. In January 2026, he was promoted to president at the studio. (Note: Attributed to multiple references:)

==== Voice and acting roles ====
Filoni provided the voice of the bounty hunter Embo and the droid CH-33P ("Cheep") in Star Wars: The Clone Wars. In the Star Wars Rebels season three episodes "The Holocrons of Fate" and "Legacy of Mandalore", Filoni voiced a Rebel Crewman, Stormtroopers, and Mandalorian Warrior, respectively. He also voiced Chopper for the entirety of the show, a fact not revealed until the end credits of the series finale.

Filoni made his live action acting debut in The Mandalorian as an X-Wing pilot named Trapper Wolf in "Chapter 6: The Prisoner". He later reprised the character in "Chapter 10: The Passenger", "Chapter 21: The Pirate", and The Mandalorian and Grogu.

== Creation process and influences ==
Filoni has frequently cited anime and manga as a primary creative influence on his works, notably Princess Mononoke using the character San as a blueprint for the design and temperament of Ahsoka Tano, and later integrated the film's spiritual and nature-based themes into Star Wars Rebels and the live-action Ahsoka series.

Filoni has also said that his grandfather and uncle were pilots, with the latter specializing in restoring planes. He cited this as a significant influence with regard to the concept of Star Wars Resistance.

== Filmography ==
=== Theatrical films ===
Title	Year	Credited as				Role	Notes
Title	Year	Director	Writer	Producer	Art department	Role	Notes
Star Wars: The Clone Wars	2008	Yes	No	No	Yes		animation film / development artist
Star Wars: The Force Awakens	2015	No	No	No	Yes	Screaming Jakku villager (voice)	live-action film / concept artist
Rogue One: A Star Wars Story	2016	No	No	No	No	Chopper (voice)	live-action film / special thanks
Star Wars: The Mandalorian and Grogu	2026	No	Yes	Yes	No	Trapper Wolf	live-action film / second unit director

=== Television and streaming ===
==== Live-action credits ====
Title	Year	Credited as					Role	Notes
Title	Year	Creator	Director	Writer	Executive producer	Art department	Role	Notes
The WIN Awards	2005	No	No	No	No	Yes		animation director
The Mandalorian	2019–2023	No	Yes	Yes	Yes	No	Trapper Wolf	live-action debut second unit director
Disney Gallery: The Mandalorian	2020–2023	No	No	No	Yes	No	Himself	documentary
The Book of Boba Fett	2021–2022	No	Yes	Yes	Yes	No		
Disney Gallery: The Book of Boba Fett	2022	No	No	No	Yes	No	Himself	documentary
Obi-Wan Kenobi	2022	No	No	No	No	No		Special Thanks to, Executive Creative Counsel
Ahsoka	2023–present	Yes	Yes	Yes	Yes	No	Chopper (voice)	
Skeleton Crew	2024–2025	No	No	No	Yes	No		

==== Animation credits ====
Title	Year	Credited as					Voice role(s)	Notes
Title	Year	Creator	Director	Writer	Executive producer	Animation department	Voice role(s)	Notes
King of the Hill	1997–1999	No	No	No	No	Yes		character & storyboard artist / assistant director
Mission Hill	1999–2002	No	No	No	No	Yes		storyboard artist / assistant director
The Oblongs	2001	No	No	No	No	Yes		retakes / assistant director
Teamo Supremo	2002	No	No	No	No	Yes		storyboard artist
Kim Possible	2003	No	No	No	No	Yes		storyboard artist & revisions
Fillmore!	2003	No	No	No	No	Yes		storyboard artist
Lilo & Stitch: The Series	2003–2004	No	No	No	No	Yes		storyboard artist
Dave the Barbarian	2004–2005	No	No	No	No	Yes		storyboard artist
American Dragon: Jake Long	2005	No	No	No	No	Yes		storyboard artist
Avatar: The Last Airbender	2005	No	Yes	No	No	Yes		storyboard artist / character designer
Star Wars: The Clone Wars	2008–2014, 2020	No	Supervising	Yes	Yes (Note: Only for Season 7.)	Yes	Embo / Various	development artist
Star Wars Rebels	2014–2018	Yes	Supervising (Note: For seasons 1, 2 and 4.)	Yes	Yes	Yes	Chopper / Various	storyboard artist
Star Wars Forces of Destiny	2017–2018	No	Additional	Additional	Yes	Yes	Chopper / Stormtrooper	storyboard artist
Lego Star Wars: All-Stars	2018	No	No	No	No	No	Chopper	
Star Wars Resistance	2018–2020	Yes / Developer	No	Story	Yes	No	Bo Keevil / Various	
Star Wars: The Bad Batch	2021–2024	Yes / Developer	No	Yes	Yes	No	Chopper	
Zen - Grogu and Dust Bunnies	2022	No	No	No	No	No		special thanks
Star Wars Tales	2022–present	Yes	Supervising	Yes	Yes	No		
Star Wars: Visions	2023	No	No	No	No	No		special thanks
Star Wars: Young Jedi Adventures	2023–2025	No	No	No	No	No		executive creative advisor
Star Wars: Maul – Shadow Lord	2026–present	Yes / Developer	No	No	Yes	No		

=== Episodic directing and writing credits ===
Title	Season	Episode	Name	Director	Writer	Notes
Avatar: The Last Airbender	1	1	"The Boy in the Iceberg"	Yes	No	
Avatar: The Last Airbender	1	2	"The Avatar Returns"	Yes	No	
Avatar: The Last Airbender	1	6	"Imprisoned"	Yes	No	
Avatar: The Last Airbender	1	10	"Jet"	Yes	No	
Avatar: The Last Airbender	1	13	"The Blue Spirit"	Yes	No	
Avatar: The Last Airbender	1	14	"The Fortuneteller"	Yes	No	
Avatar: The Last Airbender	1	17	"The Northern Air Temple"	Yes	No	
Avatar: The Last Airbender	1	20	"The Siege of the North, Part 2"	Yes	No	
Star Wars: The Clone Wars	Theatrical film			Yes	No	
Star Wars: The Clone Wars	1	2	"Rising Malevolence"	Yes	Add.	Teleplays written by Steven Melching
Star Wars: The Clone Wars	1	3	"Shadow of Malevolence"	No	Add.	Teleplays written by Steven Melching
Star Wars: The Clone Wars	1	4	"Destroy Malevolence"	No	Add.	Teleplays written by Steven Melching
Star Wars: The Clone Wars	1	9	"Cloak of Darkness"	Yes	No	
Star Wars: The Clone Wars	2	22	"Lethal Trackdown"	Yes	Yes	Co-written with Drew Z. Greenberg
Star Wars: The Clone Wars	3	1	"Clone Cadets"	Yes	No	
Star Wars: The Clone Wars	3	21	"Padawan Lost"	Yes	No	
Star Wars: The Clone Wars	3	22	"Wookiee Hunt"	Yes	No	
Star Wars: The Clone Wars	4	14	"A Friend in Need"	Yes	No	
Star Wars: The Clone Wars	5	2	"A War on Two Fronts"	Yes	No	
Star Wars: The Clone Wars	5	20	"The Wrong Jedi"	Yes	No	
Star Wars: The Clone Wars	7	2	"A Distant Echo"	No	Yes	Co-written with Matt Michnovetz & Brent Friedman
Star Wars: The Clone Wars	7	5	"Gone with a Trace"	No	Yes	Co-written with Charles Murray
Star Wars: The Clone Wars	7	6	"Deal No Deal"	No	Yes	Co-written with Charles Murray
Star Wars: The Clone Wars	7	7	"Dangerous Debt"	No	Yes	Co-written with Charles Murray
Star Wars: The Clone Wars	7	8	"Together Again"	No	Yes	Co-written with Charles Murray
Star Wars: The Clone Wars	7	9	"Old Friends Not Forgotten"	No	Yes	
Star Wars: The Clone Wars	7	10	"The Phantom Apprentice"	No	Yes	
Star Wars: The Clone Wars	7	11	"Shattered"	No	Yes	
Star Wars: The Clone Wars	7	12	"Victory and Death"	No	Yes	
Star Wars Rebels	Shorts	1	"The Machine in the Ghost"	Yes	No	
Star Wars Rebels	Shorts	4	"Property of Ezra Bridger"	Yes	No	
Star Wars Rebels	1	10	"Path of the Jedi"	Yes	No	
Star Wars Rebels	1	15	"Fire Across the Galaxy"	Yes	No	
Star Wars Rebels	Special		"The Ultimate Guide"	Yes	No	Co-directed with Steward Lee & Steven G. Lee
Star Wars Rebels	2	3	"The Lost Commanders"	Yes	No	Co-directed with Sergio Paez
Star Wars Rebels	2	7	"Wings of the Master"	Yes	No	Co-directed with Sergio Paez
Star Wars Rebels	2	21–22	"Twilight of the Apprentice"	Yes	Yes	Co-written with Melching & Simon Kinberg
Star Wars Rebels	3	12–13	"Ghosts of Geonosis"	No	Yes	Co-written with Melching & Michnovetz
Star Wars Rebels	3	15	"Trials of the Darksaber"	No	Yes	
Star Wars Rebels	3	20	"Twin Suns"	Yes	Yes	Co-written with Henry Gilroy
Star Wars Rebels	4	6	"Flight of the Defender"	No	Yes	Co-written with Melching
Star Wars Rebels	4	7	"Kindred"	No	Yes	Co-written with Gilroy
Star Wars Rebels	4	9	"Rebel Assault"	No	Yes	Co-written with Melching
Star Wars Rebels	4	10	"Jedi Night"	No	Yes	Co-written with Gilroy
Star Wars Rebels	4	11	"DUME"	No	Yes	Co-written with Christopher Yost
Star Wars Rebels	4	12	"Wolves and a Door"	Yes	Yes	Co-directed with Bosco Ng
Star Wars Rebels	4	13	"A World Between Worlds"	Yes	Yes	Co-directed with Steward Lee
Star Wars Rebels	4	14	"A Fool's Hope"	Yes	No	Co-directed with Saul Ruiz
Star Wars Rebels	4	15–16	"Family Reunion and Farewell"	Yes	Yes	Co-directed with Ng & Paez; Co-written with Gilroy, Kinberg, Melching & Kiri Hart
Star Wars: Forces of Destiny	Specials	2	"Volume 2"	No	Add.	Teleplays written by Jennifer Muro
Star Wars: Forces of Destiny	Specials	3	"Volume 3"	Add.	Add.	Directed by Brad Rau; Teleplays written by Muro
Star Wars Resistance	1	1–2	"The Recruit"	No	Story	Teleplay written by Brandon Auman
The Mandalorian	1	1	"Chapter 1: The Mandalorian"	Yes	No	
The Mandalorian	1	5	"Chapter 5: The Gunslinger"	Yes	Yes	
The Mandalorian	2	5	"Chapter 13: The Jedi"	Yes	Yes	
The Mandalorian	3	4	"Chapter 20: The Foundling"	No	Yes	Co-written with Jon Favreau
The Mandalorian	3	7	"Chapter 23: The Spies"	No	Yes	Co-written with Jon Favreau
The Mandalorian	Theatrical film			No	Yes	Co-written with Jon Favreau
Star Wars: The Bad Batch	1	1	"Aftermath"	No	Yes	Co-written with Jennifer Corbett
The Book of Boba Fett	1	6	"Chapter 6: From the Desert Comes a Stranger"	Yes	Yes	Co-written with Favreau
Star Wars: Tales	Tales of Jedi	1	"Life and Death"	No	Yes	
Star Wars: Tales	Tales of Jedi	2	"Justice"	No	Yes	
Star Wars: Tales	Tales of Jedi	4	"The Sith Lord"	No	Yes	
Star Wars: Tales	Tales of Jedi	5	"Practice Makes Perfect"	No	Yes	
Star Wars: Tales	Tales of Jedi	6	"Resolve"	No	Yes	
Star Wars: Tales	Tales of the Empire	1	"The Path of Fear"	No	Story	Teleplays written by Amanda Rose Muñoz
Star Wars: Tales	Tales of the Empire	2	"The Path of Anger"	No	Story	Teleplays written by Amanda Rose Muñoz
Star Wars: Tales	Tales of the Empire	3	"The Path of Hate"	No	Story	Teleplays written by Amanda Rose Muñoz
Star Wars: Tales	Tales of the Empire	4	"Devoted"	No	Story	Teleplay written by Nicolas Anasatassiou
Star Wars: Tales	Tales of the Empire	5	"Realization"	No	Story	Teleplays written by Michnovetz
Star Wars: Tales	Tales of the Empire	6	"The Way Out"	No	Story	Teleplays written by Michnovetz
Star Wars: Tales	Tales of the Underworld	1	"A Way Forward"	No	Story	Teleplays written by Michnovetz
Star Wars: Tales	Tales of the Underworld	2	"Friends"	No	Story	Teleplays written by Michnovetz
Star Wars: Tales	Tales of the Underworld	3	"One Warrior to Another"	No	Story	Teleplays written by Michnovetz
Star Wars: Tales	Tales of the Underworld	4	"The Good Life"	No	Story	Teleplays written by Michnovetz
Star Wars: Tales	Tales of the Underworld	5	"A Good Turn"	No	Story	Teleplays written by Michnovetz
Star Wars: Tales	Tales of the Underworld	6	"One Good Deed"	No	Story	Teleplays written by Michnovetz
Ahsoka	1	1	"Part One: Master and Apprentice"	Yes	Yes	
Ahsoka	1	2	"Part Two: Toil and Trouble"	No	Yes	
Ahsoka	1	3	"Part Three: Time to Fly"	No	Yes	
Ahsoka	1	4	"Part Four: Fallen Jedi"	No	Yes	
Ahsoka	1	5	"Part Five: Shadow Warrior"	Yes	Yes	
Ahsoka	1	6	"Part Six: Far, Far Away"	No	Yes	
Ahsoka	1	7	"Part Seven: Dreams and Madness"	No	Yes	
Ahsoka	1	8	"Part Eight: The Jedi, the Witch, and the Warlord"	No	Yes	
Ahsoka	2	1	TBA	Yes	Yes	
Ahsoka	2	2	TBA	No	Yes	
Ahsoka	2	3	TBA	No	Yes	
Ahsoka	2	4	TBA	No	Yes	
Ahsoka	2	5	TBA	No	Yes	
Ahsoka	2	6	TBA	No	Yes	
Ahsoka	2	7	TBA	No	Yes	
Ahsoka	2	8	TBA	Yes	Yes	

== Bibliography ==
Year	Title	Role	Notes
2008	The Clone Wars 1	Cover arts	Comics
2009	The Clone Wars 7: In Service of the Republic, Part 1	Cover arts	Comics
2012	The Clone Wars: The Sith Hunters	Cover arts	Comics
2015	Dark Disciple	Based on screenplays of eight unproduced episodes for The Clone Wars co-written with Filoni	Novels
2016	The Confidence Chronicles	Illustrations	Novels

== Accolades ==
Year	Award	Category	Nominated work	Result
2013	40th Daytime Creative Arts Emmy Awards	Outstanding Directing in an Animated Program	Star Wars: The Clone Wars	Nominated
2013	40th Daytime Creative Arts Emmy Awards	Outstanding Special Class Animated Program	Star Wars: The Clone Wars	Won
2014	41st Daytime Creative Arts Emmy Awards	Outstanding Special Class Animated Program	Star Wars: The Clone Wars	Won
2015	42nd Daytime Creative Arts Emmy Awards	Outstanding Directing in an Animated Program	Star Wars: The Clone Wars	Nominated
2015	42nd Daytime Creative Arts Emmy Awards	Outstanding Special Class Animated Program	Star Wars: The Clone Wars	Nominated
2017	69th Primetime Creative Arts Emmy Awards	Outstanding Children's Program	Star Wars Rebels	Nominated
2018	70th Primetime Creative Arts Emmy Awards	Outstanding Children's Program	Star Wars Rebels	Nominated
2019	71st Primetime Creative Arts Emmy Awards	Outstanding Children's Program	Star Wars Resistance	Nominated
2020	72nd Primetime Creative Arts Emmy Awards	Outstanding Children's Program	Star Wars Resistance	Nominated
2020	72nd Primetime Emmy Awards	Outstanding Drama Series	The Mandalorian	Nominated
2021	78th Golden Globe Awards	Best Television Series – Drama	The Mandalorian	Nominated
2021	73rd Primetime Emmy Awards	Outstanding Drama Series	The Mandalorian	Nominated
2021	73rd Primetime Emmy Awards	Outstanding Writing for a Drama Series ("Chapter 13: The Jedi")	The Mandalorian	Nominated
2026	4th Children's and Family Emmy Awards	Outstanding Young Teen Series	Star Wars: Skeleton Crew	Won
