= The Siege of the North =

- Avatar: The Last Airbender episodes
- The climax of the episode sees Aang merging with the ocean spirit to end the Fire Nation's attack on the Northern Water Tribe.
- Episode nos.: Season 1 Episodes 19/20
- Directed by: Lauren MacMullan (part 1); Dave Filoni (part 2)
- Written by: John O'Bryan (part 1); Aaron Ehasz (part 2)
- Production codes: 119 (part 1); 120 (part 2)
- Original air date: December 2, 2005

Guest appearances
- Jon Polito as Chief Arnook; Victor Brandt as Pakku; Johanna Braddy as Princess Yue; Ben Diskin as Hahn; Erik Todd Dellums as Koh

Episode chronology
← Previous "The Waterbending Master"	Next → "The Avatar State"
- Avatar: The Last Airbender (season 1)

"The Siege of the North" is the two-part season finale of the first season of the American animated television series Avatar: The Last Airbender, and comprises the 19th and the 20th episode of the season. The show follows Aang (Zach Tyler Eisen), the last airbender and the “Avatar”, on his journey to bring balance to a war-torn world by mastering all four elements: air, water, earth, and fire. On his quest, he is joined by companions Katara (Mae Whitman) and Sokka (Jack DeSena) and hunted down by Fire Nation prince Zuko (Dante Basco). The first part of the episode was written by John O'Bryan and directed by Lauren MacMullan, with the second part being written by Aaron Ehasz and directed by Dave Filoni.

The episode follows Aang and his friends fighting to save the Northern Water Tribe from a Fire Nation siege, led by Admiral Zhao (Jason Isaacs) who seeks to destroy the moon spirit, while Prince Zuko sneaks into the city to capture Aang. The episodes also mark the culmination of the arc concerning the conflict between Zuko and Zhao. The episodes mark Isaacs' final appearance in the series as Zhao, as well as the introduction of Koh the Face Stealer (Erik Todd Dellums) and Zuko's sister Princess Azula (non-speaking role). The episode premiered on Nickelodeon on December 2, 2005, and received critical acclaim.

== Plot ==
While Katara is making heavy progress in her training with Master Pakku, Sokka takes Princess Yue on a date aboard Appa, where they notice a fleet of Fire Navy ships approaching the Northern Water Tribe. Chief Arnook tells the citizens that war is approaching and that volunteers will be needed to fight the Fire Nation. Sokka volunteers, as does Hahn, a cocky soldier who is revealed to be engaged to Yue. After Hahn doesn't take any of Sokka's advice seriously, Sokka attacks him, leading to Arnook removing him from the mission to infiltrate Zhao's fleet. Arnook instead asks Sokka to guard Yue, a mission he gladly accepts.

Avatar Aang manages to take down one Fire Navy ship, but upon seeing the massive fleet of ships, realizes he cannot take them all down alone, and fears that he may let the Water Tribe down just like his people. (Note: As depicted in "The Storm") Hearing his worries, Yue takes him to the Spirit Oasis, a place where all spiritual energy in the North Pole is concentrated. There, Aang enters the Spirit World, as Katara and Yue stand guard over his body. Meanwhile, Iroh helps Zuko, who has snuck onto Zhao's ship in disguise, with his plan of infiltrating the Water Tribe during the attack to capture the Avatar. Iroh opens up to Zuko, telling him that ever since he lost his son to the war, he thinks of Zuko as his own. Zuko sneakily enters the city by himself by kayaking from Zhao's ship and free swimming underneath a glacier.

As nightfall nears, Iroh warns Zhao to halt the attack as the waterbenders would gain additional power from the full moon. Zhao cryptically notes he is working on a solution, but agrees with Iroh for the interim. Zuko arrives at the Spirit Oasis and engages in a battle with Katara, commenting that Katara has gotten much better at waterbending. As the sun rises, Zuko's power increases and he is able to defeat Katara and kidnap Aang's body, his spirit still adrift in the spirit world. The Fire Nation continues the attack on the Water Tribe, Zhao easily dealing with Hahn and his crew as they attack his ship. Iroh learns from Zhao that he found an underground secret library (Note: Later seen in "The Library") that revealed to him the identities of the Moon and Ocean spirit, from which the waterbenders derive their power. In the spirit world, Avatar Roku instructs Aang to find the only spirit old enough to remember the moon and ocean's spirit mortal forms: Koh, the Face Stealer. Aang visits Koh, a large, centipede-like spirit, who reveals he took a loved one's face from one of Aang's past lives, (Note: Avatar Kuruk) and tells Aang that the moon and ocean spirits' names are Tui and La, "Push and pull". Aang connects that their mortal forms must be the fish he saw earlier in the Spirit Oasis, which resembled yin and yang.

Zuko, dragging along Aang's body, struggles to find shelter in the middle of a blizzard. He eventually finds a cave to lay low where he laments on his struggles, comparing himself to his sister (Note: Princess Azula) who his father claimed was "born lucky" while he was "lucky to be born." Armed with new knowledge, Aang returns to the physical world, with help from the spirit Hei Bai. (Note: Seen earlier in "The Spirit World") Flying on Appa, Sokka, Katara and Yue find Zuko just as Aang exits the spirit world and enters back into his body. Katara quickly defeats Zuko, leaving him to die in the blizzard, but Aang decides to take Zuko with them, saving his life. As they fly back to the northern Water Tribe, Zhao enters the Spirit Oasis and captures the Moon Spirit, leading to the Moon turning red. Yue reveals that when she was born, her parents saved her life by allowing the Moon Spirit to heal her, granting her a part of itself, and now with the Moon spirit captured she feels weak. Aang and his friends return and try to convince Zhao to let the Moon spirit go, with Iroh furiously threatening Zhao once the Spirits were involved. Zhao lets the spirit go but quickly kills it, creating a lunar eclipse and depriving the waterbenders of their power.

Iroh begins attacking the firebenders while Zhao flees only to be chased down by Zuko, who looks to defeat him in retaliation for trying to have him killed. (Note: As depicted in "The Waterbending Master") Aang enters the Avatar State and merges with the Ocean spirit to create a kaiju-like monster that wreaks havoc on the Fire Nation forces, and drives away the fleet of ships attacking the Water Tribe. Iroh notices that Yue has some of the Moon Spirit in her, and gives her the idea to return it. Yue sacrifices her life and becomes the new Moon Spirit, giving Sokka a final farewell kiss. Zhao is dragged underwater to his demise by the vengeful Ocean spirit in retaliation for killing the Moon Spirit, (Note: It is later revealed in The Legend of Korra episode "Darkness Falls" that Zhao was taken into the Spirit World and remains trapped there 171 years later.) arrogantly refusing to accept Zuko's help, even in his final moments. The Fire Nation fully retreats, and the siege comes to an end. With the Moon returned to normal, the Ocean spirit separates from Aang, returning to the Spirit Oasis. Iroh and Zuko escape on a tiny boat that drifts into the unknown, while Aang prepares to set off on more adventures to stop the Fire Nation with Katara appointed as his new waterbending master.

In the Fire Nation, Fire Lord Ozai tasks Zuko's younger sister, Princess Azula to hunt down Zuko and Iroh, who have now been branded traitors.

== Credits ==
Main cast members Zach Tyler Eisen, Mae Whitman, Jack DeSena, Dante Basco and Dee Bradley Baker appear as the voices of Aang, Katara, Sokka, Zuko, and Appa respectively. Appearing in both parts are guest stars: Mako as Zuko's uncle Iroh, Jason Isaacs as Admiral Zhao, Jon Polito as Northern Water Tribe Chief Arnook, Victor Brandt as waterbending master Pakku, Johanna Braddy as Arnook's daughter Princess Yue, and Ben Diskin as Hahn.

Guest starring in part 2 only are Erik Todd Dellums as Koh the Face Stealer, James Garrett as Aang's previous incarnation Avatar Roku, and Mark Hamill as Fire Lord Ozai. This marks Garrett's third episode voicing Roku, and Hamill's second time voicing Ozai with this first time being the first appearance of Ozai in the present-day as his previous appearance in "The Storm" was in a flashback sequence.

The first part of the finale was directed by Lauren MacMullan, who would go on to direct many episodes from the show, and written by John O'Bryan. The second part of the finale was directed by Dave Filoni, his final episode for the series, and written by head writer Aaron Ehasz.

== Production ==
The animation for the first part of the episode was done by South Korean animation studio DR Movie and the second part by JM Animation.

According to series creators Michael Dante DiMartino and Bryan Konietzko, Hahn, a character that only appears in these two episodes, was designed after a storyboard artist on the crew, and the pupil Katara defeats at the beginning of part 1 is modelled after the brother of character designer, Angela Mueller. Also according to the series creators, before settling on 'the Face Stealer', Koh was originally going to be referred to as 'the Expression Taker,' or 'the Mug Mugger.'

The episode was later adapted into the finale of the first season of the Netflix live-action adaptation, titled "Legends"

== Critical reception ==
Tory Ireland Mell of IGN gave Part 1 a rating of 8.4 out of 10, commenting that "it was fun episode with some story problems", and gave Part 2 a rating of 9.3 out of 10, writing "From epic action to heartwarming storytelling, part two of the "Siege of the North" saga didn't pull a single punch and delivered what we expected to see when watch this show." Hayden Childs of The A.V. Club praised the two-part episode for its tension building and fairy tale feeling, stating "As in so many other stories, Book 1 all comes down to a giant holy fish monster and a girl who sacrifices her life to be the moon. It's like a fairy tale. A weird, unsettling, unsanitized fairy tale. While last week's episodes paused for a short breath, the two-parter this week is a breathless culmination of most of the plotlines from this season, constantly ratcheting up the tension until we get to the rampaging monster."

In 2020, The Harvard Crimson ranked part 1 and part 2 as the 36th and 12th best episode of the series respectively, writing that the second part elicited "chills." Max Nicholson from IGN ranked the second part of the finale as the second-best episode of the show, writing "There was something almost mythic about [the episode] that really nailed the dichotomy of fire and water, that push and pull. At the same time, it hit all the emotional beats and defining character moments. It was satisfactory on every level, and it got you pumped for the next season."
