= The Boy in the Iceberg =

- Avatar: The Last Airbender episode
- Aang, in the iceberg, serves as the namesake of the episode.
- Episode no.: Season 1 Episode 1
- Directed by: Dave Filoni
- Written by: Michael Dante DiMartino; Bryan Konietzko
- Production code: 101
- Original air date: February 21, 2005
- Running time: 23 minutes

Guest appearance
- Melendy Britt as Kanna

Episode chronology
← Previous —	Next → "The Avatar Returns"

"The Boy in the Iceberg" is the series premiere, and the first episode of the first season, of the American animated television series Avatar: The Last Airbender. The episode was directed by Dave Filoni and was written by series creators Michael Dante DiMartino and Bryan Konietzko, with additional writing being done by Aaron Ehasz, Peter Goldfinger and Josh Stolberg. It originally aired on Nickelodeon on February 21, 2005, alongside the following episode, "The Avatar Returns".

As the first episode of the series, it introduces the setting and the main characters of the show, and centers on two siblings from the Southern Water Tribe, Sokka (Jack DeSena) and Katara (Mae Whitman). The two find a young boy named Aang (Zach Tyler Eisen), trapped in an iceberg. They rescue him, while the banished prince of the Fire Nation, Zuko (Dante Basco), alongside his uncle Iroh (Mako), tries to track down the Avatar, the only person capable of bending all four elements; air, water, earth, and fire. The episode received mostly positive reviews from critics, who praised the writing and voice acting.

== Plot ==
The world is divided into four nations: the Water Tribe, the Earth Kingdom, the Fire Nation, and the Air Nomads, who each have certain individuals called "benders" who can bend one of the four elements. 100 years ago, the Fire Nation declared war on the other nations, and the only person capable of bending all four elements, the Avatar, mysteriously vanished.

Near the Southern Water Tribe, two siblings Katara and Sokka are fishing in the icy waters outside their village. Katara tries using her waterbending to catch a fish, but Sokka accidentally ruins her attempt, getting splashed with water in the process. After he makes a misogynistic comment, Katara becomes enraged, her waterbending quickly becoming out of control. Her outburst brings a sunken iceberg up to the surface, with a boy visibly enclosed in it, sitting cross legged. Katara, using Sokka's club, cracks the iceberg open, sending a beam of light into the air which Prince Zuko sees from his boat. Zuko's uncle, Iroh, encourages him not to waste any more of the crew's time, but Zuko is determined to follow the light, hoping that it might bring him to the elusive Avatar. The boy exits the iceberg and introduces himself as Aang and shows the two siblings his flying bison Appa. Katara learns Aang is an airbender, after he sneezes himself higher than 10 feet in the air, and due to his traditional blue tattoos.

Katara and Sokka take Aang back to the village where he meets their grandmother 'Gran-Gran' and showcases his gliding skills to the village. Aang begins to have fun with the village kids, but Sokka steps in claiming there's no time for fun and games with a war going on. Aang however claims he has never heard of any war. Katara asks Aang if he could teach her waterbending, however Aang reveals he knows nothing about it and instead offers to fly Katara to the Northern Water Tribe at the North Pole on Appa so she can learn from a master there. Aang and Katara go penguin sledding and end up near an abandoned Fire Nation ship from a previous attack on the southern Water Tribe. Entering the ship, Katara reveals that the war started 100 years ago and that Aang's ignorance of it must be due to him having been in the iceberg all that time. When exiting the ship, Aang accidentally sets off a booby trap, revealing the location of him and the village to Zuko, who claims he has found the Avatar.

== Unaired pilot ==
An original unaired pilot of the show was created by show creators Michael Dante DiMartino and Bryan Konietzko as a pitch to Nickelodeon to create the series. While the animation style and character designs remained mostly the same, there were many plot and character differences. Aang was voiced by Mitchel Musso and would later be replaced by Zach Tyler Eisen. Katara's name was originally Kya, a name that would later be used for Sokka and Katara's mother. The pilot follows Aang, Kya (Mae Whitman), and Sokka (Jack DeSena) as they try to escape the Fire Nation prince, Zuko (Dante Basco), who is hunting them.

The episode was directed and written by DiMartino and Konietzko, with additional writing from Scott Sonneborn and Sib Ventress. It was originally released on September 19, 2006, with the release of the first season on DVD, alongside a commentary from the series creators highlighting how aspects of the pilot made their way into the show. In August 2020, Nickelodeon streamed the pilot on Twitch and later uploaded it to the official Avatar YouTube channel.

== Credits ==
Main cast members Zach Tyler Eisen, Mae Whitman, Jack DeSena, Dante Basco and Dee Bradley Baker appear as the voices of Aang, Katara, Sokka, Zuko, and Appa respectively. Mako guest stars as Zuko's wise uncle Iroh, and Melendy Britt guest stars as Sokka and Katara's grandmother Kanna, who goes by the name of 'Gran Gran.'

The episode was directed by Dave Filoni, who would later direct seven more episodes in the first season. The episode was written by series creators Michael Dante DiMartino and Bryan Konietzko, with additional writing by Aaron Ehasz, Peter Goldfinger and Josh Stolberg. Ehasz would later serve as the head writer of the show and directly contribute to ten future episodes.

== Production ==
During the episode Aang and Katara go penguin sledding. According to the series creators, the animals they ride are penguin-otters, a mix of penguins and otters, and the whiskers were influenced by a moustache style called the Fu Manchu, a moustache style that was made popular by kung fu movies. The weapons Aang and Katara find in the abandoned Fire Nation ship are designed after those used in ancient China such as a guandao, a ji, and a podao.

== Critical reception ==
Tory Ireland Mell of IGN gave the episode a rating of 9.4 out of 10, commenting that "[it] was a fun and entertaining episode with a cast of unique and interesting characters" and that "the animation style is beautiful and well done." Hayden Childs of The A.V. Club gave the episode an A− score praising the writing for introducing the characters well. Daniel Montesinos-Donaghy for Den of Geek praised the episode for its worldbuiling writing "gosh, this episode does lay out quite a lot in under twenty-five minutes".

In 2020, The Harvard Crimson ranked "The Boy in the Iceberg" as the worst episode of the show, writing that "The first is the worst. It's a good sign when a series only goes up from the first episode."
