= Lauren MacMullan =

American animation director (born 1964)

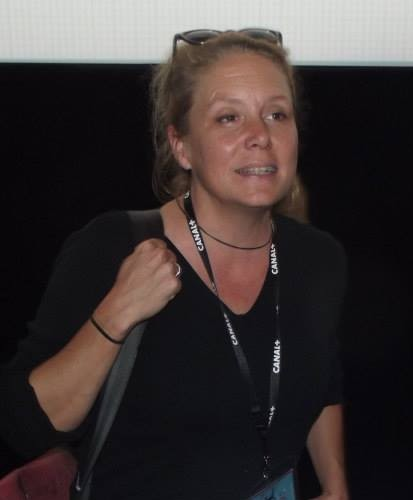
- MacMullan at the 2013 Annecy International Animated Film Festival
- Born: Lauren Hunter MacMullan; April 30, 1964 (age 62); Boston, Massachusetts, U.S.
- Occupation: Animation director
- Years active: 1994–present
- Notable work: King of the Hill; Mission Hill; The Simpsons; Avatar: The Last Airbender; Get a Horse!

Lauren Hunter MacMullan (born April 30, 1964) is an American animation director. She grew up in the Pennsylvania suburbs of Havertown, Lansdowne and Swarthmore, and graduated from Swarthmore High School in 1982. She attended Harvard University, and was on the staff of the Harvard Lampoon. Her first primetime TV job was on The Critic, where she directed the episode with guest stars Gene Siskel and Roger Ebert, followed by directing for King of the Hill. She went on to become the supervising director and designer for Mission Hill. After the show was cancelled quickly, she got a job directing on The Simpsons, and stayed for three seasons. She also has directed some episodes of Avatar: The Last Airbender, and won an Annie award for storyboarding on that show.

MacMullan was a sequence director on The Simpsons Movie, and in 2009 she was a member of the Pixar team working on the animated film Newt prior to its cancellation. She is currently at Walt Disney Animation Studios, where she worked on the storyboards to Wreck-It Ralph and Zootopia, as well as directing the 2013 Oscar-nominated animated short film Get a Horse!, featuring Mickey Mouse. With Get a Horse!, she became the first woman to solely direct a Disney animated film (short-length or feature-length).

== Filmography ==
=== The Critic episodes ===
She has directed the following episodes

- "A Little Deb Will Do You"
- "A Day at the Races and a Night at the Opera"
- "Siskel & Ebert & Jay & Alice"
- "I Can't Believe It's a Clip Show"

=== King of the Hill episodes ===
She has directed the following episodes:

- "Three Days of the Kahndo"
- "Death of a Propane Salesman"

=== The Simpsons episodes ===
She has directed the following episodes:

- "Bye Bye Nerdie"
- "Half-Decent Proposal"
- "Little Girl in the Big Ten"
- "Moe Baby Blues"
- "I, (Annoyed Grunt)-bot"
- "The Wandering Juvie"
- "Sleeping with the Enemy"

=== Avatar: The Last Airbender episodes ===
She has directed the following episodes:

- "The Southern Air Temple"
- "The Spirit World (Winter Solstice, Part 1)"
- "The Storm"
- "The Deserter"
- "Siege of the North, Part 1"
- "The Cave of Two Lovers"
- "Avatar Day"
- "Zuko Alone"
- "The Desert"
- "City of Walls and Secrets"
- "Lake Laogai"

=== Disenchantment episodes ===
She has directed the following episodes:

- "Last Splash"

=== Short films ===
- Get a Horse!
