= Avatar: The Last Airbender season 1 =

Animated television series episode list

Avatar: The Last Airbender
- Season 1 Book One: Water
- DVD cover for the first season
- Showrunners: Michael Dante DiMartino; Bryan Konietzko
- Starring: Zach Tyler Eisen; Mae Whitman; Jack DeSena; Dante Basco; Dee Bradley Baker; Mako; Jason Isaacs
- No. of episodes: 20

Release
- Original network: Nickelodeon
- Original release: February 21 – December 2, 2005

Season chronology
- Next → Book Two: Earth

Book One: Water is the first season of Avatar: The Last Airbender, an American animated television series created by Michael Dante DiMartino and Bryan Konietzko and produced by Nickelodeon Animation Studio. The first season aired on Nickelodeon from February 21 to December 2, 2005, and consisted of 20 episodes. The series stars Zach Tyler Eisen, Mae Whitman, Jack DeSena, Dante Basco, Dee Bradley Baker, Mako Iwamatsu and Jason Isaacs as the main character voices.

The season revolves around the protagonist Aang and his friends Katara and Sokka going on a journey to the North Pole to find a Waterbending master to teach Aang and Katara. The Fire Nation is waging a seemingly endless imperialist war against the Earth Kingdom and the Water Tribes, following the genocide of the Air Nomads one hundred years ago. Aang, the current Avatar, must master the four elements (Air, Water, Earth, and Fire) to end the war. Along the way, Aang and his friends are chased by various pursuers: the banished Fire Nation Prince Zuko, along with his uncle and former general Iroh, and Admiral Zhao of the Fire Navy.

Each episode of the season attracted more than a million viewers on its first airing. Between January 31 and September 19, 2006, five DVD sets were released in the United States, each containing four episodes from the season. On September 12, 2006, Nickelodeon also released the "Complete Book 1 Collection Box Set", which contained all of the episodes in the season as well as a special features disc. The original releases were encoded in Region 1, a DVD type that plays only in North American DVD players. From 2007 to 2009, Nickelodeon released Region 2 DVDs, which can play in Europe.

== Episodes ==
No. overall	No. in season	Title	Directed by	Written by	Storyboarded by	Original release date	Prod. code (Note: Production code format is taken from episode commentary for "Sozin's Comet: The Phoenix King")	U.S. viewers (millions)
1	1	"The Boy in the Iceberg"	Dave Filoni	Michael Dante DiMartino; Bryan Konietzko; Additional writing by: Aaron Ehasz; Peter Goldfinger; Josh Stolberg	Dave Filoni; Justin Ridge; Giancarlo Volpe	February 21, 2005	101	N/A
Katara and Sokka, two siblings from the Southern Water Tribe, discover a boy trapped inside an iceberg floating on the sea. They free him and he introduces himself as Aang, an airbender of the Air Nomads—a culture believed to be extinct for 100 years. Aang and his six-legged sky bison, Appa, accompany Katara and Sokka to their village. Meanwhile Prince Zuko of the Fire Nation, accompanied by his uncle Iroh, is patrolling the surrounding waters in search of the Avatar, a fabled bender who can master all four elements and restore balance to the world. Katara confides in Aang that she is a waterbender, but there are no other waterbenders in her tribe to teach her. Aang offers to take her to the Northern Water Tribe to find a teacher. An overturned fire nation warship reveals that Aang is unaware of the war that the Fire Nation has waged against the other nations of the world for 100 years, causing Katara to deduce that Aang must have been frozen for at least that long. The pair accidentally set off a signal flare on the ship alerting Zuko, who already suspects the Avatar is nearby.
2	2	"The Avatar Returns"	Dave Filoni	Michael Dante DiMartino; Bryan Konietzko; Additional writing by: Aaron Ehasz; Peter Goldfinger; Josh Stolberg	Dave Filoni; Chris Graham; Miyuki Hoshikawa; Justin Ridge; Giancarlo Volpe	February 21, 2005	102	N/A
After bringing Fire Nation attention to the village, Aang is banished despite Katara's objections. Zuko soon descends on the village and demands the Avatar be handed over to him. Aang returns to the village to defend it, where Zuko identifies him as the Avatar. He surrenders himself to Zuko, causing Katara and Sokka to pursue them on Appa. Aboard Zuko's ship, Aang manages to break free from the guards and battles with Zuko in the process. Aang is knocked into the water and almost drowns, but saves himself with the "Avatar State", in which he uses incredibly potent waterbending to overpower Zuko and his crew. As the three fly away on Appa, Aang explains his reluctance towards being the Avatar, and they set a course for the North Pole so that he and Katara can learn waterbending.
3	3	"The Southern Air Temple"	Lauren MacMullan	Michael Dante DiMartino	Li Hong; Lauren MacMullan; Ethan Spaulding	February 25, 2005	103	3.2
Aang returns to his home, the Southern Air Temple, where he remembers his teacher Gyatso. Katara and Sokka see a fire nation helmet, but cover it up for Aang. After they discover a group of statues of past Avatars, Aang finds that Fire Nation soldiers killed Gyatso, and enters the Avatar State, causing the statues to glow at the eyes. Zuko, having had his ship ruined, is repairing it while Commander Zhao, a high ranking Fire Nation leader, meets him and finds out the Avatar is alive. Zuko challenges him to an Agni Kai, and wins once he remembers his basics. Zhao tries to attack him while Zuko’s back is turned, but Iroh stops him and critiques his sportsmanship.
4	4	"The Warriors of Kyoshi"	Giancarlo Volpe	Nick Malis	Chris Graham; Kenji Ono; Giancarlo Volpe	March 4, 2005	104	3.7
Looking for a short break from their travels, Aang brings the group to the Earth Kingdom's Kyoshi Island, where he seeks to ride Elephant Koi. However, the group are captured by the Kyoshi Warriors, a group of female warriors who protect the island. The trio are freed when Aang proves he is the Avatar, a reincarnation of Avatar Kyoshi, and he quickly gains popularity. His popularity, especially among the girls, goes to his head and creates a rift between him and Katara. Meanwhile, Sokka is embarrassed after being bested by girls in combat training, and strives to prove himself stronger than the Kyoshi Warriors. When he suffers further embarrassment, he swallows his pride and asks to be trained by their leader Suki, who agrees. Aang's desire for popularity soon puts himself and Katara at risk when he tries to ride an Unagi serpent, and he endangers the whole island when Zuko gets word of his location. Zuko attacks, but Aang, Katara, and Sokka manage to escape and draw the Fire Nation away. Aang uses the Unagi to extinguish the fires caused by the attack.
5	5	"The King of Omashu"	Anthony Lioi	John O'Bryan	Ian Graham; Anthony Lioi; Bobby Rubio	March 18, 2005	105	3.6
The group arrives at the Earth Kingdom city of Omashu. There, Aang shows Katara and Sokka the Omashu mail delivery system, a massive network of stone causeways which he and his friend Bumi had once ridden for fun a hundred years previous. The trio gives the chutes a try but runs into trouble after they destroy a cabbage merchant's cart. Brought before the king of the city, an elderly neurotic man, the three are given a feast, during which the king outs Aang as being the Avatar and imprisons them and puts Aang through three deadly challenges the next day to test his skills and earn Katara and Sokka's freedom, culminating in a duel with the king himself. After Aang passes all of the challenges, the king forces Aang to guess his name. Aang ponders the question, finally deducing the king is his old friend Bumi. Bumi and Aang finally reunite, and Katara and Sokka are set free.
6	6	"Imprisoned"	Dave Filoni	Matthew Hubbard	Dave Filoni; Miyuki Hoshikawa; Justin Ridge	March 25, 2005	106	N/A
Aang, Katara, and Sokka camp near a small Earth Kingdom town where they meet a young earthbender named Haru. They find the town is occupied by the Fire Nation, and earthbending is forbidden with risk of imprisonment. Katara convinces Haru to save an old man using his earthbending, only for the same man to turn Haru in to the Fire Nation. Katara devises a plan to save Haru by getting herself arrested for earthbending, which she fakes with some help from Aang and Sokka. When she arrives at the Fire Nation prison, a metal sea fortress that is impervious to earthbending, she finds Haru and his long-imprisoned father Tyro. However, she also discovers that all of the prisoners have lost hope of escape due to their inability to bend. Katara successfully leads a rebellion with Aang and Sokka's help by delivering the earthbenders coal from the fortress, which Katara uses to inspire them into action. The earthbenders escape after battling the Fire Nation guards, and head for their occupied towns with plans to rebel against Fire Nation occupation. Haru thanks Katara for reuniting him with his father, and Katara is shocked when she realizes her late mother's necklace is missing, found by Zuko back on the fortress.
7	7	"Winter Solstice"	Lauren MacMullan	Aaron Ehasz	Jerry Langford; Lauren MacMullan; Ethan Spaulding	April 8, 2005	107	N/A
8	8	"Winter Solstice"	Giancarlo Volpe	Michael Dante DiMartino	Chris Graham; Kenji Ono; Giancarlo Volpe	April 15, 2005	108	N/A
Part 1: "The Spirit World": The trio find themselves in a small Earth Kingdom village that is being attacked by Hei Bai, a monster from the Spirit World. The villagers believe that Aang can make peace with the spirit, since the Avatar is the bridge to the Spirit World. Aang tries to calm the monster, which kidnaps Sokka. Aang pursues them, but fails to rescue Sokka and ends up in the Spirit World, where he can’t airbend. While there he is told that the previous Avatar, Roku, has a message for him on the Winter Solstice the next day, delivered by the spirit of Roku's dragon. After returning to the physical world, Aang calms the attacking spirit, who was upset that the nearby forest he watches over was destroyed by the Fire Nation. Hei Bai leaves in peace, returning all of the villagers and Sokka unharmed. Elsewhere, Iroh is captured by Earth Kingdom soldiers while bathing in a hot spring. The soldiers plan to take him to the Earth Kingdom capital, Ba Sing Se, to face justice, but Zuko eventually catches up with the soldiers to help free him, forgoing his chase for the Avatar for a while. Part 2: "Avatar Roku": Aang, Katara, and Sokka travel to a temple in the Fire Nation so Aang can receive Roku's message. The three bypass Zhao’s blockade, while Zuko pursues them. At the temple, Aang, Katara and Sokka discover that the sages who guard the temple have joined the fire lord. The sages attack, but one is still loyal and leads them to the sanctuary. Aang enters the sanctuary after narrowly avoiding capture. Zhao arrives having tracked Zuko, intending to apprehend both him and Aang. Avatar Roku informs Aang about a comet whose power Fire Lord Sozin used to begin the war. Sozin's Comet will return by the end of the coming summer and give Fire Lord Ozai the power to finish the war with a brutal assault, meaning Aang must master all four elements and defeat the Fire Lord. Roku's spirit manifests inside Aang's body, making everyone flee the temple before it is destroyed.
9	9	"The Waterbending Scroll"	Anthony Lioi	John O'Bryan	Ian Graham; Bryan Konietzko; Anthony Lioi; Bobby Rubio	April 29, 2005	109	N/A
Aang grows frantic about the comet, getting Katara to teach him her limited knowledge of Waterbending, which comes naturally for Aang, much to Katara's frustration. Later, while in town to buy supplies, Katara finds a waterbending scroll on a pirate ship, which she then steals. Katara struggles to learn the techniques in the scroll, while Aang picks them up quickly, further frustrating Katara. Meanwhile, Zuko runs into the pirates and agrees to help them find the scroll and Aang. They find and capture Aang, Katara, and Sokka, but Sokka turns the pirates against Zuko, and the three escape in the ensuing chaos, with Aang and Katara using their new waterbending skills to defeat the pirates.
10	10	"Jet"	Dave Filoni	James Eagan	Dave Filoni; Miyuki Hoshikawa; Justin Ridge	May 6, 2005	110	3.4
Sokka, Katara, and Aang fight a group of firebenders, and are saved by a group called the Freedom Fighters, led by Jet. Sokka turns against Jet after he frames an old man for attempted assassination, which causes Aang and Katara to think him jealous. Jet tells Katara and Aang to fill a reservoir to stop the Fire Nation, and Sokka finds out that Jet plans to flood an occupied Earth Nation town with it. Jet’s friends take Sokka away, but he escapes. He evacuates the town, where the old man vouches for him. Sokka, Katara, and Aang leave on Appa.
11	11	"The Great Divide"	Giancarlo Volpe	John O'Bryan	Michael Dante DiMartino; Chris Graham; Kenji Ono; Giancarlo Volpe	May 20, 2005	111	N/A
The group ventures into the Great Divide, the world's largest canyon. Katara and Sokka start bickering, so Aang decides to put his diplomatic skills to the test, as the Avatar is supposed to be a conciliator and promoter of peace. He successfully solves their minor disputes, but Aang's skills are soon put to a more substantial test when two Earth Kingdom tribes, the Zhang and the Gan-Jin, who have been in a feud for over a hundred years, are forced to cross the canyon together en route to Ba Sing Se. The Gan-Jin believe that their ancient leader was robbed by the ancient Zhang leader, while the Zhang believe their leader was only trying to help and was falsely imprisoned. The tribes are guided by an earthbender guide across the vast, dry landscape. Along the way, they are hunted down by large native predators called canyon crawlers. In the end, Aang is able to end the feud by lying that their legends are based on a children's ball game and that their leaders were twin brothers. The two tribes travel together with the guide to the famous capital city of the Earth Kingdom, Ba Sing Se.
12	12	"The Storm"	Lauren MacMullan	Aaron Ehasz	Jerry Langford; Lauren MacMullan; Ethan Spaulding	June 3, 2005	112	N/A
Sokka is hired to assist a fisherman with the group needing money. The fisherman berates Aang and angrily tells him that he "turned his back on the world". Guilt-ridden, Aang flies away and later reveals to Katara that he ran away from home after being excluded from activities with his friends and because the monks at the Southern Air Temple wanted to separate him from Gyatso to begin his Avatar training; after getting caught in a terrible storm, he inadvertently sealed himself and Appa in the iceberg after crashing into the ocean until Katara and Sokka found him. Meanwhile, after resolving a feud on Zuko's ship, Iroh tells the crew that the scar on Zuko's face was the result of a duel with his own father Ozai, who had taken offense when Zuko spoke out in a meeting opposing a plan to sacrifice Fire Nation soldiers. Zuko was subsequently banished for showing weakness by refusing to fight Ozai, and sent to capture the Avatar. When another storm hits, Sokka and the fisherman are rescued by Aang and Katara. Aang is forced to enter the Avatar State, mirroring the events that led to him being trapped in the iceberg, but this time he is able to escape with the fisherman, Appa, Katara and Sokka. Zuko also acts heroically when his ship is struck by lightning, rescuing a member of his crew who becomes trapped on the bridge, as Iroh redirect more lightning away from the ship. Zuko sees Aang flying away on Appa, but elects not to pursue them in order to bring his crew to safety.
13	13	"The Blue Spirit"	Dave Filoni	Michael Dante DiMartino; Bryan Konietzko	Michael Dante DiMartino; Ian Graham; Bryan Konietzko; Anthony Lioi; Bobby Rubio	June 17, 2005	113	N/A
Sokka suffers from an illness due to his exposure to the elements during the storm. When Katara contracts the illness as well, Aang goes to a nearby herbalist institute in hopes of finding a cure. On his way to collect the remedy (frozen wood frogs for Katara and Sokka to suck on) Aang is captured by the Yu Yan archers, commanded by the newly-promoted Admiral Zhao. However, a sword-wielding masked marauder, the "Blue Spirit", rescues Aang from Zhao's compound. The Blue Spirit is knocked unconscious during the escape, and is revealed to be Zuko. Aang saves him and wonders if they could've been friends before the war. Aang flees when he is violently rebuffed. Zuko sulks back to his ship while Aang successfully cures Katara and Sokka.
14	14	"The Fortuneteller"	Dave Filoni	Aaron Ehasz; John O'Bryan	Dave Filoni; Ian Graham; Miyuki Hoshikawa; Justin Ridge	September 23, 2005	114	N/A
Aang, Katara and Sokka come across a village that relies solely on the predictions of its fortuneteller, Aunt Wu. Sokka is skeptical and refuses to believe anything she says, trying to discredit all of her predictions. Katara, on the other hand, is obsessed and keeps returning to Aunt Wu for more predictions on her love life. Aang, who has developed feelings for Katara, attempts to win her attention throughout, with no success. Eventually he attempts to fetch a rare Panda Lily flower from the lip of a nearby volcano, which is revealed to be on the verge of erupting — a direct contradiction to Aunt Wu's cloud-reading predictions. Katara and Aang use waterbending to manipulate the clouds as a warning to Aunt Wu and the villagers, and the group manages to evacuate the village before the volcano erupts. As the lava comes toward the town, Aang pushes it back with strong airbending, causing Sokka to comment that Aang is a "powerful bender". This catches Katara by surprise, as Aunt Wu had earlier predicted that she would marry a "powerful bender". The trio depart the village, with Aunt Wu reminding Aang that just as he reshaped the clouds, he has the power to shape his own destiny.
15	15	"Bato of the Water Tribe"	Giancarlo Volpe	Ian Wilcox	Chris Graham; Kenji Ono; Bobby Rubio; Giancarlo Volpe	October 7, 2005	115	N/A
Sokka, Aang, and Katara find a seemingly-abandoned Water Tribe ship that belongs to their father's fleet. Camping out by the boat, Sokka and Katara are overjoyed when they are joined by Bato, an old friend of their father and fellow member of the Southern Water Tribe. Bato had been injured in battle and temporarily left behind by the rest of the Water Tribe soldiers while he heals. While they reminisce about the old days, Aang feels left out. A messenger arrives with a message from Katara and Sokka's father for Bato, with instructions to find him. Aang intercepts it and keeps it to himself, fearing Katara and Sokka will abandon him. He later comes clean about the message, but Sokka, furious at Aang for keeping it from them, is insistent on leaving to find his father, with Katara joining him. Meanwhile, Zuko hires a bounty hunter, June, to help him track down the Avatar, utilizing a large mammalian mount (shirshu) with a powerful sense of smell, using Katara's necklace as the scent. After Bato's comments on his loneliness after being left behind by his fellow soldiers reminds Sokka of his sorrow the day their father left, Sokka realizes that helping Aang is where he and Katara are needed the most. However, they're ambushed by Zuko and June who then use the message scroll to track down Aang. This leads to a fight, with Katara and Sokka helping to rescue Aang and resume their collective journey to the North Pole. Aang returns Katara's necklace to her after recovering it from Zuko during the fight.
16	16	"The Deserter"	Lauren MacMullan	Tim Hedrick	Dean Kelly; Jerry Langford; Lauren MacMullan; Ethan Spaulding	October 21, 2005	116	3.0
The kids travel into a Fire Nation town, which is hosting a festival of Fire Nation culture. Unfortunately, Aang's identity is discovered but a strange man, Chey, helps the gang escape. Chey tells the trio about "The Deserter", a man named Jeong Jeong who is the first to desert the Fire Nation army and live. Jeong Jeong initially refuses to teach Aang because he is not ready to handle the destruction fire can bring. It is only when Avatar Roku's spirit intervenes that Jeong Jeong consents to teach Aang. Aang struggles with the hard discipline required for firebending. While trying to prove he was ready for more, he accidentally burns Katara's hands, infuriating Sokka and Jeong Jeong. Katara learns that she can use her waterbending to heal, but Aang nevertheless regards firebending as dangerous and vows never to do it again. Meanwhile, Aang is tracked down by Zhao, revealed to be Jeong Jeong's former student. He fights Aang, but Aang uses Zhao's lack of self-control, pointed out earlier by Jeong Jeong, against him and causes Zhao to burn his own ships. Aang is burned during the fight but is healed by Katara, as Jeong Jeong disappears without a trace.
17	17	"The Northern Air Temple"	Dave Filoni	Elizabeth Welch	Dave Filoni; Ian Graham; Miyuki Hoshikawa; Justin Ridge	November 4, 2005	117	N/A
The gang hears a rumor that people who travel in the air reside at the Northern Air Temple, making Aang think there were some survivors of Sozin's genocide. He is disappointed to learn that the "flying" people are not true airbenders, but just people who have learned how to use gliders on the strong air currents around the temple. Aang is further saddened that the current residents have remodeled the temple extensively, often knocking through walls and ornate Air Nomad architecture to accommodate pipes which propel their rudimentary experiments with steam pressure. Teo, a young paraplegic, inspires Aang to open the one remaining area of the temple left untouched, the Air Temple sanctuary. Aang is shocked to see the "pristine" room is in fact stocked with dozens of inventions with Fire Nation insignias on them. Teo's father, a skilled mechanist, confesses to aiding the Fire Nation by building weapons in exchange for the guaranteed safety of his son and his people. When the Fire Nation comes to collect their latest invention, Aang tells them to leave. The Fire Nation launches an attack against the temple, but Aang and the villagers manage to successfully defend their ground. The Fire Nation does manage to recover the mechanist's newest invention, a war balloon.
18	18	"The Waterbending Master"	Giancarlo Volpe	Michael Dante DiMartino	Chris Graham; Kenji Ono; Bobby Rubio; Giancarlo Volpe	November 18, 2005	118	N/A
The group finally reaches the Northern Water Tribe, where they receive a hero's welcome. Sokka meets Princess Yue, the daughter of the chief, and is immediately attracted to her. Aang and Katara seek to learn waterbending from a rather snippy master named Pakku, but he refuses to teach Katara, as women in the Northern Water Tribe are only trained to use their waterbending for healing, with combat training reserved for men. Sokka tries to spend more time with Princess Yue, who agrees to meet him later on that night. However, when the time comes Yue changes her mind and runs away. Meanwhile, Zhao commandeers Zuko's crew for a mission to attack the North Pole, and in the process deduces that Zuko is the Blue Spirit who freed the Avatar. Katara, inspired by a comment from Sokka, suggests that Aang teach her what he learns from Master Pakku every night. Unfortunately, Pakku is onto them and discovers them, and refuses to teach Aang any further. In front of the tribe council, a fed-up Katara refuses to apologize to Pakku so he may change his mind and instead challenges him to a duel, demonstrating her considerable skill and potential. Zhao hires the pirates from "The Waterbending Scroll" to kill Zuko, which they attempt by blowing up his docked ship while Iroh is out for a walk. Back at the Fire Nation port, Zhao blatantly feigns remorse to Iroh and offers the former general a place beside him for the mission. Iroh accepts, but is revealed to be deceiving Zhao by helping Zuko fake his own death and stow away as a soldier aboard the command ship. Back at the North Pole, Pakku takes notice of Katara's pendant, given to her by her mother and her grandmother before her, and realizes that Katara's Gran-Gran is his ex-fiancée Kanna, who also could not tolerate the Northern Water Tribe's customs and left to start a new life with the Southern Tribe. Sokka proceeds to tell Yue how he feels about her, which culminates in Yue kissing him. She sadly tells Sokka that she also has feelings for him, but they can't be together since Yue is engaged to be married. As a new day dawns, Pakku has agreed to train both Aang and Katara while Zhao's massive armada departs for the North Pole.
19	19	"The Siege of the North"	Lauren MacMullan	John O'Bryan	Oreste Canestrelli; Dean Kelly; Lauren MacMullan; Ethan Spaulding	December 2, 2005	119	3.6
20	20	"The Siege of the North"	Dave Filoni	Aaron Ehasz	Dave Filoni; Ian Graham; Miyuki Hoshikawa; Justin Ridge	December 2, 2005	120	3.6
Part 1: Some time later Katara has developed into Master Pakku's star pupil, earning her his highest praises. Sokka and Yue spend more time together including a ride on Appa, during which Sokka notices a storm of soot, a sign of an impending Fire Navy raid. As the tribe prepares for battle, the chief asks for volunteers for a dangerous mission, to which Sokka immediately agrees. As Zhao's armada closes in, Iroh meets with Zuko in disguise as a Fire Nation guard, as he tells Iroh that he's working on a plan of his own. As the Northern tribe takes up battle stations, the raid begins. Aang and Appa work to help disable the lead ship, but are overwhelmed at the size of the fleet that follows. In preparation for the chief's secret mission of infiltrating the Fire Navy, Sokka clashes with a Northern soldier named Hahn before realizing he is Yue's fiancé. The chief takes Sokka off the mission and assigns him to protect Yue. As nightfall nears, Iroh warns Zhao to halt the attack as the waterbenders will draw power from the nearly-full moon. Zhao cryptically notes he is working on a solution, but agrees with Iroh for the interim. Iroh then meets up with Zuko, who plans to kayak from Zhao's ship and infiltrate the North Pole to capture Aang. He nearly drowns after choosing to free swim under the glacier to find a way in, but is able to infiltrate the city. Meanwhile, Aang and Katara are brought to a spiritual oasis at the top of the city by Yue, with Aang hoping to find the Moon and Ocean spirits for help. Aang begins to meditate in front of a koi pond with two fish circling each other, and when he realizes they resemble Yin and Yang he crosses into the spirit world. Zuko arrives shortly after and battles with Katara until sunrise, when he overpowers her and escapes with Aang's body as the Fire Nation resumes the attack. Part 2: Zuko struggles to find shelter for himself and Aang in the frozen tundra, while Sokka, Katara and Yue search for them, as the Fire Nation forces assault the city. In the spirit world, Roku contacts Aang and tells him that the ocean and moon spirits crossed over to the mortal world long ago, and that only one spirit is old enough to remember: Koh the Face-Stealer. Aang must show no emotion or expression at all when meeting with him, or else his face will be stolen off of his head. Back in the physical world, Zhao informs Iroh of his grand plan: While serving in the Earth Kingdom as a young lieutenant, Zhao discovered a secret underground library that gave him the identity of the moon spirit's mortal form, with Zhao viewing it as his destiny to kill it. Aang learns from Koh that the spirits' names are Tui and La, "Push and pull", and that they are in great danger. Aang figures out the Koi fish are the spirits, and quickly heads back to the physical world, coincidentally leading Katara, Sokka, and Yue right to his body. Zuko is quickly defeated, but Aang chooses to save him. As they fly back, Zhao captures Tui, the moon spirit, causing a lunar eclipse and the waterbenders to lose their bending. Aang and Iroh both warn Zhao that the entire world depends on the balance of the moon and ocean, including the Fire Nation. Zhao initially relents, but then attacks in a fit of rage, killing the spirit and darkening the moon completely. Iroh furiously attacks Zhao and his guards, as Zhao quickly flees. Aang enters the Avatar State and, merging with the ocean spirit, decimates the Fire Nation armada by forming a massive spiritual projection. Zuko fights Zhao in retaliation for the assassination attempt, while Iroh remains to try and revive the moon spirit. He recognizes that Yue was touched by the moon spirit, by her snow-white hair. Yue confirms this as the moon spirit saved her life when she was born ill. Yue gives back the spark of life, sacrificing herself. She assumes the form of the moon spirit and gives Sokka a final kiss goodbye. Zhao is dragged underwater to his demise (Note: Zhao was revealed to be alive but trapped in the Spirit World in The Legend of Korra) by the ocean spirit in retaliation for slaying the moon spirit, arrogantly refusing to accept Zuko's help. Pakku anoints Katara as Aang's new waterbending master as the group contemplates their next move, while Ozai assigns Azula, Zuko's younger sister, to hunt down Iroh and Zuko for their treacherous actions at the North Pole.

== Production ==
The show was produced by Nickelodeon Animation Studio and aired on Nickelodeon, both of which are owned by Viacom. The show's executive producers were co-creators Michael Dante DiMartino and Bryan Konietzko, who worked alongside head writer and co-producer Aaron Ehasz. Eight episodes were directed by Dave Filoni. Animation directors Lauren MacMullan and Giancarlo Volpe directed five episodes each, and Anthony Lioi directed two.

Episodes were written or co-written by a team of writers, which included Nick Malis, John O'Bryan, Matthew Hubbard, James Eagan, Ian Wilcox, Tim Hedrick and Elizabeth Welch. All of the show's music was composed by "The Track Team", which consists of Jeremy Zuckerman and Benjamin Wynn, who were known to the producers because Zuckerman was Konietzko's roommate. Two alternating Korean studios were enlisted to provide animation production support for the series, DR Movie and JM Animation Co.

== Cast ==
Most of the show's main characters made their debut within most, if not all, of the first episodes: Zach Tyler Eisen provided Aang's voice, Mae Whitman as Katara's voice, Jack DeSena as Sokka's voice, Dante Basco as Zuko's voice, Mako as Iroh's voice, and Dee Bradley Baker as the voices of both Appa and Momo. Additional supporting characters include Commander (later Admiral) Zhao, voiced by Jason Isaacs.

== Reception ==
Film critics appreciated the first season of Avatar: The Last Airbender because it attracted the attention of "an audience beyond the children's market with crisp animation and layered storytelling." On the review aggregator Rotten Tomatoes, the season has an approval rating of 100% based on 11 reviews, with an average rating of 8.6/10. The website's critical consensus reads: "A brilliant blend of magic, humor, and adventure, Avatar is an instant classic." As for the video and picture quality, Gord Lacey from TVShowsOnDVD.com claims "the colors are bright, and the picture is nearly flawless." He says later in the review that "the audio is very nice, with lots of directional effects and nice musical cues." Barnes & Noble reviewer Christina Urban praised the season's masterful combination of "elements from Chinese kung fu, Tibetan philosophy, Japanese martial arts forms, and even Hindu spiritual beliefs". According to Aaron Bynum from AnimationInsider.net, "the series posted double digit year-to-year gains in May". He also said that the show has been number one in the boys 9- to 14-year-old demographic, and has attracted many age and gender groups in its pool of 1.1 million viewers who watch each new episode.

In addition, the season has won many awards throughout its runtime. During the 33rd Annual Annie Awards, the show was nominated for the "Best Animated Television Production" award. Because of the episode "The Fortuneteller", the show was nominated for the "Writing for an Animated Television Production" award. For the episode "The Deserter", the season was nominated for and won the "Storyboarding in an Animated Television Production" award. During the 2005 Pulcinella Awards, the season won the "Best Action/Adventure TV Series" award as well and the general "Best TV Series" award.

== Home media release ==
Map of DVD region codes: Region 1, 2 and 4 are in red, orange and green, respectively

=== Region 1 ===
Nickelodeon and Paramount Home Entertainment started releasing Season One DVDs in North America on January 31, 2006, with a series of single-disc sets containing four episodes per disc. Later the Complete Book 1 Collection was released on September 12, 2006, containing all twenty episodes plus extras on six discs.

=== Region 2 ===
PAL versions of the single-disc volume sets started being released on February 19, 2007;. As with the original Region 1 NTSC DVDs, each set contains four episodes per disc. The Complete Book One Collection was released on January 26, 2009, containing all twenty episodes on five discs. These Region 2 releases lack the commentary tracks and other DVD extras found on the Region 1 releases.

Volume	Discs	Episodes	Release date		
Volume	Discs	Episodes	Region 1	Region 2	Region 4
1	1	4	January 31, 2006	February 19, 2007	March 15, 2007
2	1	4	March 28, 2006	June 4, 2007	July 5, 2007
3	1	4	May 30, 2006	September 3, 2007	March 13, 2008
4	1	4	July 18, 2006	February 18, 2008	June 19, 2008
5	1	4	September 19, 2006	May 26, 2008	March 5, 2009
Box set	6	20	September 12, 2006	January 26, 2009	June 4, 2009

== Other Media ==
=== Live-action adaptations ===
The Last Airbender is a live-action film based on the first season of the animated television series and had a theatrical release on July 1, 2010. The film, directed by M. Night Shyamalan, was universally panned by critics, audiences and fans of the series alike and grossed $319 million on a $150 million budget.

The first season would once again be adapted into an unrelated live-action series and released on Netflix on February 22, 2024. The series received mixed reviews from critics and audiences.

=== Soundtrack ===
In 2023, the soundtrack to the first season was released.
