= Mission Hill (TV series) =

American adult animated sitcom

- The show's title card. Clockwise from top left: Jim Kuback, Kevin French. Posey Tyler, Andy French and Stogie in the center.
- Also known as: The Downtowners (working title)
- Genre: Animated sitcom; Comedy drama
- Created by: Bill Oakley; Josh Weinstein
- Voices of: Wallace Langham; Scott Menville; Brian Posehn; Vicki Lewis; Nick Jameson; Tom Kenny
- Theme music composer: John McCrea
- Opening theme: "Italian Leather Sofa" (instrumental) by Cake
- Composer: Eric Speier
- Country of origin: United States
- No. of seasons: 1
- No. of episodes: 13

Production
- Executive producers: Bill Oakley; Josh Weinstein
- Producer: Colin A.B.V. Lewis
- Running time: 21–23 minutes
- Production companies: Bill Oakley/Josh Weinstein Productions; Castle Rock Entertainment

Original release
- Network: The WB, Adult Swim
- Release: September 21, 1999 – August 11, 2002

Mission Hill is an American animated sitcom created by Bill Oakley and Josh Weinstein for the WB. It originally aired for five episodes from September 21, 1999, to July 16, 2000; unaired episodes were burned off on Cartoon Network's Adult Swim from May 26 to August 11, 2002. The series follows Andy French, a retail worker who lives with roommates Jim and Posey as well as their dog, Stogie. Andy's lifestyle is taken for a turn when his younger brother Kevin moves in with him.

Stylistically, the series is recognizable for its bright, neon color palette, and features a peculiar mixture of modern animation and traditional "cartoonish" drawings (dashed lines coming from eyes to indicate line of vision, red bolts of lightning around a spot suffered). The style was made to be reminiscent of 1930s rubber hose cartoons such as Fleischer Studios, Walt Disney, Warner Bros., and MGM, as well as mid-century modern cartoons with the likes of Hanna-Barbera, UPA, Jay Ward, and The Pink Panther. The designs were done by Lauren MacMullan, who cites the comic series Eightball as her source of inspiration for her overall design.

Despite garnering poor ratings during its initial run, Mission Hill has since gained a cult following, and is also popular outside of North America, receiving broadcasts in Australia, Eastern Europe, Latin America, Spain and New Zealand.

== Premise ==
The series centers on a group of young adults, primarily focusing on Andy French, whose sheltered suburban teenage brother, Kevin, moves in with him and his roommates in a metropolitan loft.

The show's narrative is set in the titular Mission Hill, which exists within the larger city of Cosmopolis. Cosmopolis is portrayed as a major modern urban metropolis, drawing visual and cultural parallels to cities such as New York City and Chicago. According to the series’ official website, Mission Hill is inspired by several real-world neighborhoods, including the Mission Hill in Boston (situated a few miles away from where creator Bill Oakley attended college), the Mission District in San Francisco, Silver Lake in Los Angeles, Wicker Park in Chicago, and Williamsburg in Brooklyn. The precise geographic location of Cosmopolis is deliberately ambiguous, combining characteristics of both East and West Coast cities. While most episodes are situated within Mission Hill, the skyline of Downtown Cosmopolis is occasionally visible in the background.

In the DVD commentaries, Josh Weinstein noted that considerable effort was dedicated to developing Mission Hill as a fully realized fictional city. Writers and animators collaborated to create original elements such as advertisements, musical acts, local foods, and public transit schedules. The Boston neighborhood of Mission Hill, located in the Roxbury area, shares several notable similarities with its fictional counterpart.

== Characters ==
=== Main ===
- Andrew "Andy" French (Wallace Langham) is a 24-year-old in his third consecutive "post-college slump year." Andy is an aspiring cartoonist. From the pilot episode to "Unemployment, Part 1," Andy worked at a waterbed store where his boss was a lecherous, short, ill-tempered, foul-mouthed man who frequented strip clubs. From "Unemployment, Part 2" to "Plan 9 from Mission Hill" (and including the unproduced episodes "Supertool" and "Pretty in Pink"), Andy works as an artist at the same advertising agency as Jim. Often bored and mellow, Andy is easily annoyed by his younger brother, Kevin, though it has been shown that Andy does indeed care about him. However, he often has a habit of calling him and others "douchebag".
- Kevin French (Scott Menville) is Andy's 17-year-old nerd brother. Kevin moved in with Andy when his parents left for Wyoming, bringing his sheltered, suburban mindset to Mission Hill. He hopes to attend Yale University, and prides himself on his SAT scores. He has a habit of "bling-blonging", saying "bling blong" over and over again while doing homework to drown out any/all distractions and is prone to heavily overreact to trivial matters. Actor Andy Dick also auditioned for this role and was nearly cast.
- James "Jim" Kuback (Brian Posehn) – In his mid-20s, loftmate Jim has been Andy's best friend since high school. He is extremely tall and lanky, with red hair and a beard much like his voice actor, and speaks in a deep, monotone voice. Jim is a genius at all things electronic, whether it's electronic music or computers. He is mellow and able to express a wide variety of sentiments by nuancing the word "Okay." Jim is a high-powered advertising agent who is paid vast amounts of money to alter marketing campaigns to appeal to Generation Y.
- Posey Tyler (Vicki Lewis) – In her mid-20s, Posey, the fourth hippie loftmate, is somewhat a flower child, and very concerned about the health and well-being of her plants. She often gives her vegetables to charity, but gets upset when they are damaged. She often speaks quickly and in a nervous tone.
- Stogie is Andy's pet Golden Retriever, who can apparently stomach anything from alcoholic drinks to remote controls. At one point in the series his primary source of food was eating the couch cushions. Posey has stated that "there are dark forces at work within him", in the first episode.

=== Supporting ===
- Gus Duncz (Nick Jameson) is a gay man in his late 60s, he owns a diner in Mission Hill. He is a very large, burly man with a short temper and is married to Wally. According to audio commentary by the producers, Gus is based on Broderick Crawford, though according to the audio commentary for The Simpsons seventh-season episode, "Marge Be Not Proud," Bill Oakley and Josh Weinstein claim the inspiration for the character was Lawrence Tierney (who voiced the Try-N-Save store detective who catches Bart shoplifting).
- Wally Langford (Tom Kenny) is a gay man in his late 60s, Wally is a projectionist at the local art movie house. He enjoys cinema and ragtime music. In the episode "I Married a Gay Man from Outer Space", it is revealed that he directed a film in the 1950s entitled The Man from Pluto (which parodied Plan 9 from Outer Space). It starred his partner Gus in the title role. The character was based on David Niven and Wally Cox.
- Natalie Leibowitz-Hernandez (Vicki Lewis) – Late 20s. Politically correct and intellectually well-endowed, Natalie is a professor of Women's Studies at the local college. Sensitive to biases in our culture, Natalie and her husband have yet to name their baby as they want it to have cultural significance reflective of their own respective cultures. She is Jewish. She is a working mother who supports both "Baby Nameless" and her non-working "marital partner" Carlos. The character of Natalie was based and modeled on the writer and educator Lois M. Leveen, a longtime friend of the show's creators. She auditioned for the voice of her own character, but the actress Vicki Lewis was determined to be even more "Lois-y" than Lois Leveen herself, and she was cast in the role instead.
- Carlos Hernandez (Herbert Sigüenza) – Late 20s. He is a struggling Latino artist and stay-at-home dad for Baby Nameless. Unlike his Jewish wife Natalie, Carlos is a Christian, his work is, at times, reminiscent of Jackson Pollock, Diego Rivera and Bob Ross. He prides himself on having no discernible style. Carlos and Natalie have a pet snake as a result of an episode involving a raid on an animal testing lab.
- Baby Nameless (Mary Oakley) – The newborn baby of Natalie and Carlos. She was modelled after and voiced by Bill Oakley's daughter Mary, who was born in June 1998, while the show was in production.
- Gwen (Jane Wiedlin) – Early 20s. Andy's on-and-off girlfriend, Gwen completed two years of community college before settling in Mission Hill. She met Andy working at Ron's Waterbed World. Someday she would like to be an accomplished person who achieves her goals and makes a serious contribution to society. She likes The Go-Go's, referring to Wiedlin's membership in the band.
- Toby Mundorf (Josh Weinstein) – In his late teens and one of Kevin's best friends in Mission Hill. His overprotective mother worries a great deal about him, as he frequently has allergies, asthma, and hunger. Despite his large size, he is a born coward.
- George Bang (Bill Oakley) is Kevin's other best friend. George works long hours after school in his father's market. George is extremely competitive in everything from taking tests to playing video games. He shares all the same interests as his best friends and is particularly proud of owning the complete Babylon 5 Collectible Card Game. Unlike his friends Toby and Kevin, his parents don't seem to be overprotective, so he is more sarcastic and aggressive than either of them. George has an older sister named Tina who goes to Polytech. George is of Korean descent.
- Ron (Nick Jameson) is a sleazy, immoral Armenian man and former boss of Andy (who loathes him). In "Unemployment, Part 1," Ron was arrested and sentenced to five years imprisonment for tax evasion, his store was also confiscated by the government as a result. He has an extremely short temper and often takes his rage out on his employees.

== Production ==
Mission Hill was conceived in 1997 by Bill Oakley and Josh Weinstein, former executive producers/showrunners of The Simpsons, with the original artistic designer being Lauren MacMullan. Oakley has mentioned that one of the main inspirations for Mission Hill was the 1997 MTV series Austin Stories, which followed a group of 20-somethings in Austin, Texas. After failed pitches to Fox and NBC, the rights to Mission Hill were purchased by production company Castle Rock Entertainment and The WB Network in the fall of 1997, following a successful pitch to Garth Ancier, the then-head of programming at the WB. Both Castle Rock and The WB were part of media conglomerate Time Warner, later known as Warner Bros. Discovery. At the 1997 pitch, network executives from the WB were presented with three designs for Andy, Jim, Kevin and Posey. One depicted them in a drastically different, more cartoonish art style; the other two drew closer resemblance to the final designs, but one featured slightly more realistic designs for Andy and Kevin, with another featuring less realistic designs for Jim and Posey. When one of the WB executives saw the alternate designs for Jim and Posey, he thought that they were the parents of Andy and Kevin. MacMullan states that the final design chosen for Posey looked "much more attractive" when compared to the two alternate designs.

In mid-1998, the WB officially announced that a 13-episode first season would begin airing in the fall of 1999, with the project being known as The Downtowners at this point. MTV's production of the similarly titled adult animated series Downtown eventually forced a name change. It featured the voices of Wallace Langham, Scott Menville, Brian Posehn, Vicki Lewis, Nick Jameson, Tom Kenny, Herbert Sigüenza, Jane Wiedlin, Tress MacNeille and Lisa Kushell. The theme song is a faster, instrumental version of "Italian Leather Sofa" by Cake, who Oakley and Weinstein were fans of. This version was specifically recorded for the show.

When the series was first sold to the WB, it was not yet synonymous with teen female-oriented drama programs such as Dawson's Creek, Felicity and Roswell, and its only popular show with that demographic was Buffy the Vampire Slayer, which premiered at the beginning of 1997. Prior to Buffy, the network had been focusing on live action comedy shows aimed at African-Americans, such as The Jamie Foxx Show, The Steve Harvey Show and The Parent 'Hood. The success of Buffy and similar programs led to The Baltimore Sun labelling it as the "teen girl network" in July 1999, two months before Mission Hill premiered. During the WB's 1999 upfront presentation to advertisers, the drama shows received applause from the advertisers in the audience, while Mission Hill was met with two minutes of silence. In 2017, Oakley claimed, "In the time they ordered the show and the time it had appeared on the air, the network had redefined itself." He adds, "they had this leftover programming, and by the time they figured out we shouldn't be lumped in together [we] were in danger of killing that entire network. We hugely damaged the ratings of those other shows." In another 2024 interview, Oakley said he initially thought that there might be some crossover between the audience of Mission Hill and shows such as Buffy, adding that "mostly at our urging, the show aired after an episode of Buffy, but all the Buffy viewers tuned out. They aired the next episode during their comedy block. We led off the night, and our ratings were so bad that we were murdering Jamie Foxx and Steve Harvey."

Although 18 episodes were planned, only 13 were produced. The series was put on hiatus by The WB after two episodes due to poor ratings. It returned in the summer of 2000 with smaller promotion, and was canceled on July 18, 2000, after four more episodes aired to poor ratings. The series went on to develop a cult following, thanks to repeated airings of all 13 episodes on the Time Warner-owned cable channels Cartoon Network and TBS. On Cartoon Network, it aired on the popular late-night programming block Adult Swim, while on TBS it aired on Too Funny to Sleep, a late-night programming block. In Australia, it aired on the local version of Cartoon Network/Adult Swim (via News Corporation's Australian pay-TV provider Foxtel), and in Canada it aired on Teletoon (part of its "Unleashed" block). Warner Home Video released all 13 completed episodes on DVD on November 29, 2005.

Bill Oakley has since voiced his dissatisfaction with the way Warner handled the series, and has said he does not mind if people pirate the series.

=== Planned revival ===
On June 30, 2020, Oakley announced plans for a spin-off tentatively titled Gus and Wally, which would center on the middle-aged gay couple who were supporting characters in Mission Hill and take place six months after the series' conclusion in the early 2000s. The series would be produced by Warner Bros. Animation for contractual reasons, as Warner still owned the rights to the IP through their subdivision Castle Rock Entertainment, who were the original copyright holders and who later became inactive. However, when the announcement was made, it was still unknown if the spin-off would be released on the Warner Bros. Discovery-owned streaming service HBO Max.

In June 2022, Oakley claimed that they were still in the process of pitching the project, and that if this version was picked up, then it would continue under the Mission Hill moniker, rather than being titled Gus and Wally. He also mentioned that it would include the unproduced episodes from the original incarnation of the show.

In March 2023, Oakley confirmed in a tweet a spin-off about Gus and Wally is "not gonna happen".

== Episodes ==
Note: Thirteen episodes of the series were produced while five more were written, but never completed. Animatics for some of these episodes were in production at the time of the series' cancellation. It was planned to put these animatics on the DVD for the series, but this never came to fruition. However, several of the animatics—including a completed video animatic and synchronized audio read-through of the episode "Pretty in Pink (Crap Gets in Your Eyes)"—have been released through various internet outlets.

No.	Title	Directed by	Written by	Original release date	Prod. code	U.S. viewers (millions)
1	"Pilot (or The Douchebag Aspect)"	Lauren MacMullan	Bill Oakley & Josh Weinstein	September 21, 1999	3950-01	2.28
Andy French, an aspiring cartoonist working at a waterbed store run by a sleazy, ambiguously Eastern European man named Ron, is forced to take in his annoying little brother, Kevin, after Andy's parents decide to move away to Wyoming and not take Kevin with them. Music: "Burning Flies" by Looper, "Couldn't You Wait" (Acoustic Version) by Silkworm, "Don't Let the Bastards Grind You Down" by The Toasters, "Rude Boy Rock" by Lionrock
2	"Andy Joins the PTA (or Great Sexpectations)"	Gary McCarver	Andrew Kreisberg	May 26, 2002 (on Adult Swim)	3950-02	N/A
When Andy attends Kevin's parent-teacher conference en lieu of their mother and father, he joins the PTA in order to impress Kevin's English teacher. Meanwhile, Kevin becomes obsessed with an online role playing game. Music: "Machete" by Moby, "Do That Thing" by The Halo Benders, "Major Leagues" by Pavement
3	"Kevin's Problem (or Porno for Pyro)"	Tricia Garcia	J. David Stem & David N. Weiss	October 8, 1999	3950-03	1.50
Kevin faces a moral dilemma when two bullies (Griffo and C-Dog) get blamed for burning down the Mission Hill market, which was an accident Kevin caused after trying to hide a pornographic magazine after one of the bullies catches him masturbating to it. Meanwhile, Jim returns from Japan wearing Day-Glo short-shorts which becomes popular with everyone (except Andy).
4	"Andy Vs. The Real World (or The Big-Ass Viacom Lawsuit)"	Christian Roman	Ben Kull	June 9, 2002 (on Adult Swim)	3950-04	N/A
Kevin finds a collection of old videos chronicling the time that MTV's The Real World filmed a season in Mission Hill -- and how Andy became part of the cast after one of the house mates gets hit by a bus. Music: "Ape Self Prevails in Me Still" by Quasi, "Everybody Hurts" by R.E.M., "Begin" by Lambchop, "Bad Boys" by Inner Circle, "Who's Afraid of Elizabeth Taylor" by Joan of Arc
5	"Andy and Kevin Make a Friend (or One Bang for Two Brothers)"	Mike Kim	Michael Panes	June 25, 2000	3950-05	1.85
Kevin and Andy fight for the affections of George's sister. Meanwhile, Gus gets stabbed in the head and Wally urges him to go to the hospital to have the knife removed. Music: "Everybody Hurts" by R.E.M., "Sideshow" by The Wake, "Dying Culture" by Wumpscut
6	"Andy Gets a Promotion (or How to Get Head in Business Without Really Trying)"	Dominic Polcino	Michael Panes	July 9, 2000	3950-06	2.25
After having his work rejected by nearly every magazine, Andy decides to abandon his dreams as a cartoonist and become Ron's assistant at the waterbed store, which changes Andy's personality for the worse. Meanwhile, Jim tries to figure out why Stogie keeps eating pieces of the couch. Music: "Blue Monday" by New Order, "Do You Really Want to Hurt Me" by Culture Club, "Le Freak" by Chic
7	"Kevin Vs. the SAT (or Nocturnal Admissions)"	Ilya Skorupsky	J. David Stem & David N. Weiss	July 2, 2000	3950-07	1.79
Kevin and his friends work furiously to crack the code for perfect scores on the SATs after learning that Ivy League schools aren't accepting students unless they have perfect SAT scores (800 Math, 800 Verbal) or are involved in extracurricular activities. Meanwhile, Posey advertises her massage services in a newspaper -- which, thanks to a spelling mistake, has her mistaken for a prostitute who does erotic massage and lands her in trouble with a local pimp. Music: "Rock and Roll Part 2" by Gary Glitter
8	"Unemployment: Part 1 (or Brother's Big Boner)"	Scott Alberts	Robin Stein	July 16, 2000	3950-08	1.81
Andy, who just blew his parents' $400 living allowance on an organ in a desperate attempt to have fun without getting drunk or having sex, finds himself unemployed when Ron gets arrested for tax evasion and the waterbed store is seized by the government. When Andy can't hold down a job, Kevin goes to Ron to sign a form that activates Andy's unemployment payment — and becomes the owner of Ron's Ferraro. Music: "Sundown" by Gordon Lightfoot, "In-A-Gadda-Da-Vida" by Iron Butterfly
9	"Unemployment: Part 2 (or Theory of the Leisure Ass)"	Michael Dante DiMartino	Aaron Ehasz	July 14, 2002 (on Adult Swim)	3950-09	N/A
After weeks of staying at home eating Bugles, collecting unemployment, and getting drunk, Andy discovers that Jim has a job — as a high-ranking executive of an advertising agency and decides to stop being a slacker and get back in the work force. Music: "Supermarket" by Clemek (from the Run Lola Run soundtrack), "The Spark that Bled" by The Flaming Lips, "9 to 5" by Dolly Parton, "Urban Gentleman" by The Jim Ruiz Group
10	"Kevin Finds Love (or Hot for Weirdie)"	Cynthia Wells	Dan McGrath	July 21, 2002 (on Adult Swim)	3950-10	N/A
Kevin asks out Eunice Eulmeyer (guest voice Jennifer Jason Leigh), the weirdest girl at his school, in the hopes that her famous scientist father will write him a letter of recommendation for Yale University. Meanwhile, Andy, Jim, and Posey are denied admission to a new nightclub, prompting them to create their own nightclub. Music: "Yo Yo" by Basement Jaxx, "Phalanx" by Jega, "Yakety Sax", "Breaking the Law" by Judas Priest
11	"Stories of Hope and Forgiveness (or Day of the Jackass)"	Christian Roman	Dan McGrath	July 28, 2002 (on Adult Swim)	3950-11	N/A
Andy is asked to the Grammys by actress Becca Michelle Butterfield; Posey meditates in an attempt to find nirvana; and Kevin gets involved in a protest when news of an international crisis hits. Music: "Arctic Cat" by The Gloria Record
12	"Happy Birthday, Kevin (or Happy Birthday, Douchebag)"	Mike Kim	Rob Schwartz & Rich Siegel	August 4, 2002 (on Adult Swim)	3950-12	N/A
Kevin's birthday is coming up, and, now that he's not at home with his family, he becomes depressed and miserable. Meanwhile, Natalie brings home a boa constrictor from an animal testing raid, and Carlos worries that the boa constrictor will attack their baby. Music: "Unsung" by Helmet, "Everloving" by Moby, "Cherry Pie" by Warrant.
13	"Plan 9 from Mission Hill (or I Married a Gay Man from Outer Space)"	Jim Shellhorn	Dan McGrath	August 11, 2002 (on Adult Swim)	3950-13	N/A
Kevin becomes fascinated with classic films when he sneaks into a local theater to watch Midnight Cowboy under the assumption that it's a porno film because of its "X" rating—and uncovers a lost B-movie that Wally directed in the 1950s. Music: *"Everybody's Talkin'" by Harry Nilsson, "Midnight Cowboy" by John Barry, György Ligeti's "Requiem for Soprano, Mezzo Sprano, two mixed choirs and orchestra" as performed by the Bavarian radio orchestra and conducted by Francis Travis is played as Kevin watches the film 2001: A Space Odyssey.

=== Unfinished episodes ===
No.	Title	Written by	Prod. code
14	"Meditations on a Career in Advertising (or Supertool)"	Ben Kull	3950-14
Andy and Jim work together on the "Chef-A-Rooni" account at the ad agency, but Jim ends up getting credit for it. Meanwhile, Kevin, Toby, and George buy an upscale Port-A-Potty after thugs Griffo, C-Dog, and Phat Ass take over the boys' room.
15	"To Grandmother's House We Go (or Freaky Weekend in the Crappy Crudwagon)"	Michael Panes	3950-15
Andy, Kevin, Jim, and Posey take a road trip on Memorial Day Weekend to Andy and Kevin's grandmother's house, but Andy locks Kevin in the trunk. Eventually, an argument breaks out between Andy, Posey and Kevin about whether or not they should go to an Indian casino, the boys' grandmother's house or a large field of sunflowers. Meanwhile, Gus and Wally take care of Stogie. Music: "Karma Chameleon" by Culture Club is the only known song used in the episode, as an animatic clip on the Internet featuring what would have been the actual soundtrack is used. The rest of the animatic has not been released to the public. The script does mention a lot of 1980s songs being used as all the radio stations are playing 1980s music during the three-day weekend.
16	"Pretty in Pink (or Crap Gets in Your Eyes)"	Aaron Ehasz	3950-16
Andy and Gwen's relationship goes through a rocky period after Gwen breaks up with Andy and Andy drunkenly sleeps with Jim's assistant, Stacy, who loves Jim and also only slept with Andy because she was drunk.
17	"Death of a Yale Man (or Premature Metriculation)"	Robin Stein	3950-17
Toby and George think Kevin is dying after he comes to school bald (which was from Kevin trying to get rid of a bad haircut) and decide to ask the head of Yale University to let Kevin in as his final wish. Meanwhile, Andy and Jim fight back against yuppie SUV drivers who keep cutting them off in traffic.
18	"Bye Bye Nerdy (or I Was a Teenage Porn Star)"	Andrew Kreisberg	3950-18
Kevin accidentally appears in the background of a porno movie being filmed in the building. When his parents discover this, they force Kevin to move with them to Wyoming, only to find out that having Kevin around again is killing their romance.

== Home media ==
DVD cover

Warner Home Video released all 13 completed episodes on DVD on November 29, 2005. The collection replaced some of the original soundtracks with stock music, most glaringly "Everybody Hurts" by R.E.M. in the episode "Andy Vs. The Real World". The DVD collection also dubbed over some of the original voice tracks to remove any references to the replaced music, for example changing Andy's voice track from saying "Gordon Lightfoot" to "Scott Joplin" in the episode "Unemployment Part 1".

== Awards ==
Mission Hill received the 2000 Pulcinella Award for "Best Series for All Audiences"; the award cited the series' "stylized design and honest approach to sexual and moral issues."

The series won an award from GLAAD for its positive portrayal of a gay relationship. The series is the first instance of a gay kiss on American network television, predating the kiss between Kerr Smith and Adam Kaufman on Dawson's Creek by a year.

== See also ==
- Cult television
