= Aang =

Fictional character from Avatar: The Last Airbender

- Avatar Legends character
- Avatar Aang in Avatar: The Last Airbender, kneeling in a battle pose, holding his new staff behind him.
- First appearance: Original series: "The Boy in the Iceberg" (2005); The Legend of Korra: "The Voice in the Night" (2012); Live-action series: "Aang" (2024)
- Last appearance: Original series: Avatar Aang: The Last Airbender (2026); The Legend of Korra: "Darkness Falls" (2013)
- Created by: Michael Dante DiMartino; Bryan Konietzko
- Voiced by: Zach Tyler Eisen (original series); Mitchel Musso (unaired pilot); D. B. Sweeney (The Legend of Korra); Eric Nam (Avatar Aang: The Last Airbender); Sander Argabrite (younger, Avatar Aang: The Last Airbender); Ben Helms (Nicktoons MLB); Jaxson McBride (Smite); Dustin Sardella (Nickelodeon All-Star Brawl); Davis Pak (Nickelodeon Kart Racers 3: Slime Speedway, Quest for Balance); Caz Inghram (Nickelodeon All-Star Brawl 2); Dan Ni Lin (Nicktoons & The Dice of Destiny, Avatar Legends: The Fighting Game)
- Portrayed by: Noah Ringer (2010 film); Gordon Cormier (2024 television series)

In-universe information
- Gender: Male
- Titles: The Avatar; Preceded by: Avatar Roku; Succeeded by: Avatar Korra
- Spouse: Katara (wife)
- Children: Bumi (son); Kya (daughter); Tenzin (son)
- Nationality: Air Nomads
- Animal guide: Appa
- Bending element: Airbending (native); Waterbending; Earthbending; Firebending; Energybending; Sub-styles: Lightning redirection; Seismic sense

Avatar Aang (Chinese: 安昂; pinyin: Ān Áng), or simply Aang, is a fictional character and the titular main protagonist of Nickelodeon's animated television series Avatar: The Last Airbender, created by Michael Dante DiMartino and Bryan Konietzko. He is voiced by Zach Tyler Eisen. Aang was the last surviving Airbender, a monk of the Air Nomads' Southern Air Temple, and the youngest ever airbending master (of his generation).

He is an incarnation of the "Avatar", the spirit of light and peace manifested in human form. As the Avatar, Aang can control all four elements (water, earth, fire, and air) and is tasked with bringing balance and keeping the Four Nations at peace. In Avatar: The Last Airbender, he is chronologically 112 years old (biologically 12), and he died chronologically at age 166 (biologically 66.) Aang is the series' reluctant hero, spending a century in suspended animation in an iceberg before being discovered and joining new friends Katara and Sokka on a quest to master the elements and save their world from the imperialist Fire Nation. As Aang progresses through his journey, he is joined by Toph, Zuko and Suki.

Aang's character has appeared in other media, such as trading cards, video games, T-shirts, and web comics. Avatar Aang was also portrayed by Noah Ringer in the live-action film The Last Airbender (2010) and voiced by D.B. Sweeney in the sequel series The Legend of Korra. Gordon Cormier portrays Avatar Aang in the Netflix live-action adaptation of the same name. Aang was succeeded by Avatar Korra, as depicted in The Legend of Korra.

== Appearances ==
=== Avatar: The Last Airbender ===
Upon death, Avatar Roku was reincarnated and Aang was born, and later raised by Monk Gyatso, a senior monk at the Southern Air Temple and friend of the late Avatar Roku. Even prior to learning he was the Avatar, Aang distinguished himself by becoming one of the youngest Airbending Masters in history by inventing a new technique. As a result of Fire Lord Sozin's increasingly hostile attitude towards the other nations, the senior monks decided to reveal Aang's nature as the Avatar four years before the traditional age (Avatars are usually told of their status once they turn 16) and relocate him to one of the other Air Temples. Learning that he was to be taken from Gyatso caused Aang to flee the monastery on his flying bison, Appa, before being caught by a storm; the life-or-death conditions triggered the Avatar State, encasing the young Avatar and his bison in an air-pocket among icebergs, where he remained suspended for a century. Although Monk Gyatso had snuck into Aang's bedroom late at night to tell Aang that he will not be relocated to the Eastern Air Temple, it had already been too late.

==== Book One: Water ====
After one hundred years of suspended animation in an iceberg, twelve-year-old Aang was freed when found by Katara and Sokka, yet unaware of the events that occurred during his rest. His reawakening catches the attention of Prince Zuko, the banished son of current Fire Lord Ozai. After a failed attempt to capture him, Aang sets off to the Northern Water Tribe, alongside Katara and Sokka, the former of whom he promises to learn waterbending with. Aang and his new friends visit the Southern Air Temple, where they meet a winged lemur whom Aang later names Momo. It is there that Aang learns that the Fire Nation wiped out his people, including Gyatso, which causes Aang to enter the Avatar State, informing the other nations of the Avatar's return. After a series of misadventures, Aang meets his previous incarnation, Roku, who informs him that he must master all four bending arts and end the war before the coming of Sozin's Comet at the end of summer. Upon arriving to the Northern Water Tribe, Aang became an apprentice of Waterbending Master Pakku alongside Katara. After helping the Water Tribe drive off a Fire Nation invasion headed by Admiral Zhao, with Katara as his teacher, Aang and his group journey to the Earth Kingdom to find an Earthbending teacher. Ozai, angered that Iroh betrayed the Fire Nation, sends his daughter, Princess Azula, to hunt down Zuko and Iroh.

==== Book Two: Earth ====
In the second season, Aang learns Earthbending from Toph Beifong after he has a vision of the blind Earthbender in a swamp telling him to find her. On their journey, they are chased by Zuko’s sister Princess Azula and her friends Mai and Ty Lee. The group learns about the Day of Black Sun in a secret underground library, and they attempt to reveal the information to the Earth King at Ba Sing Se. However, their flying bison, Appa, is captured by Sandbenders. Aang grows upset and angry and confronts the Sandbenders, learning that Appa has been sold. After stopping a Fire Nation drill threatening the safety of Ba Sing Se, they look for Appa only to find themselves dealing with the Dai Li before exposing their leader's deception. Team Avatar realizes that the people of Ba Sing Se don't know of the world war going on, and Ba Sing Se is actually a dystopia claiming to be perfect. The group reunites with Jet helping them find Appa at Dai Li headquarters. They expose the Hundred Year War to the Earth King, who promises to help them invade the Fire Nation. Soon after, Aang meets a guru who attempts to teach Aang to open his seven chakras in order to control the defensive 'Avatar State'; but when Aang perceives Katara in danger, he leaves before the seventh chakra can be cleared and blocks it, preventing him from entering the Avatar State. Aang later began to release the seventh chakra in the Crystal Catacombs but was unable to complete the process due to being fatally electrocuted by Azula. Consequently, Aang was prevented from opening the seventh chakra and mastering the Avatar State, leaving his attachment to Katara intact and blocking the seventh chakra again. He is later brought back to life by Katara, using the spirit water given to her by the Northern Water Tribe at the start of the second season.

==== Book Three: Fire ====
In the beginning of third and final season, after he woke after being knocked out by Azula, Aang grew some hair. After that, Aang is unable to use the Avatar State for quite a while. Although reluctant with the plan at first, Aang accepts to have everyone think he had died and his remaining allies attack the Fire Nation's capital, but are thwarted by Azula. However, Zuko has a change of heart, rebels against his father, and offers to teach Aang Firebending. Aang and Zuko also improve their Firebending powers with the help of their world's last two dragons. During the finale, Aang gets mad at his friends for treating the idea of Aang killing Ozai as a joke, since Aang is anti-violence (unless he has to be). He runs off and is on a strange island. His four previous past lives (Roku, Kyoshi, Kuruk, and Yangchen) try to convince him killing Ozai is the only way. But upon learning that he was actually on the back of a Lion Turtle, one of four that made the first benders by manipulating humans' chi, Aang receives the Lion Turtle's Energybending. During the final battle, Aang refuses to let go of his attachment to Katara to enter the Avatar State because he prioritizes his love for Katara over his duty to the world. Ozai violently knocks Aang onto a rock, which presses against his scar, opening his seventh chakra and allowing him to accidentally master the Avatar State without needing to let go of his attachment to Katara. Aang wins the battle, but before he delivers the final blow, he stops himself. Instead, using his new Energybending, Aang removes Ozai's firebending ability, rendering him harmless and ending the Hundred Year War. Later, in the Fire Nation capital, Aang is seen beside Zuko, the new Fire Lord. The series ends with Aang and his friends relaxing at Iroh's tea shop at Ba Sing Se, where Aang and Katara share a kiss, starting a romantic relationship.

==== Graphic Novel Trilogies ====
After beginning the Harmony Restoration Movement, an event that was meant to remove Fire Nation remnants from the Earth Kingdom, Aang agrees to end Zuko's life should he go down a path similar to his father, after the latter requests it, being stopped by Katara from entering the Avatar State as he began a later encounter with Zuko and then tries to mediate protestors and the Yu Dao resistance, afterward assembling members of a fan club and forming the "Air Acolytes", a group that he intends to teach the ways of the Air Nomads. Aang then participated in a search for Zuko's mother Ursa, successfully finding her and entering the Spirit World to assist in locating the Mother of Faces, convincing her to grant Rafa a new face. After a period of entertainment, Aang is contacted by his former life Yangchen, who tried contacting him about Old Iron's return. Aang also has a fight with the Rough Rhinos when they try to oust him from the Eastern Fire Refinery. Aang then aids in preventing Azula, disguised as the Kemurikage, from stealing any more children. He later returns to the South Pole and reunites with Katara and Sokka during the festival of the rebuilt and newly expanded Southern Water Tribe, with assistance from dozens of waterbenders and healers from the Northern Water Tribe.

=== The Legend of Korra ===
Being frozen in the iceberg for 100 years in the Avatar State drained much of Aang's life energy. While he did not feel the effects for many years, the strain of this exertion increasingly weighed upon his body as he aged. Ultimately, it resulted in Aang dying at the relatively young biological age of 66 in 153 AG. Aang was outlived by his wife, Katara, and his three children, but he did not live to see his grandchildren, all of whom would become powerful airbenders. As his death drew near, Aang tasked the Order of the White Lotus with finding and guiding the new Avatar after him.

When Aang died, the Avatar spirit reincarnated into Korra of the Southern Water Tribe. Aang intended for the Order to simply guide and guard Korra, but several mishaps in the aftermath of Aang's death (including a kidnapping attempt by the anarchist Zaheer) and the still-fragile state of relations between the now-Five Nations resulted in Korra's father Tonraq and Tenzin sequestering Korra in a compound at the South Pole, bringing teachers to her instead of allowing her to seek out her own.

==== Book One: Air ====
Avatar Aang's spirit with Korra in The Legend of Korra.

In the sequel series' first season, Avatar Aang's spirit occasionally serves as the spiritual advisor to seventeen-year-old Korra (much like the previous Avatar incarnation, Roku, did for Aang). Korra struggles with the spiritual aspects of bending and being the avatar, so initially Aang is only able to give Korra glimpses of his memory concerning Yakone in relation to her confrontations with his two sons, Amon and Tarrlok, the products of Yakone's Bloodbending vendetta on the Avatar. It is only after she loses her ability to bend that Korra allows herself to listen to her past lives, at which point Aang is able to manifest more directly to her and helps to restore her powers by triggering the Avatar State and teaching her to Energybend.

==== Book Two: Spirits ====
The sequel series' second season reveals that Avatar Aang apparently treated Tenzin as his favorite child, due to his son's Airbender status; Kya and Bumi mentioned to Tenzin that Aang always took Tenzin on vacations with him, but never them. Aang's Air Acolytes also were unaware that Aang had two other children besides Tenzin. Tenzin himself insists that Aang loved all his children equally, but that Aang took more precedence in raising him since Tenzin would have to take care of future generations of airbenders. Aang himself later appears, along with Roku, Kyoshi and Kuruk, before Korra in a vision and encourages her to learn the origins of Wan (the first Avatar) and Raava. Aang, or possibly a vision of him, later appears in the Spirit World, encouraging Tenzin to move past the enormous legacy of being Aang's son and find his own path. Korra's connection to Aang and the other preceding Avatars is severed when Vaatu extracts and subsequently kills Raava, the divine Avatar Spirit entity within her. Even though Raava is reborn and fused again with Korra, she discovers, to her dismay, that her spiritual connection to Aang and all past Avatars is presumably gone forever.

==== Book Three: Change ====
When Zaheer gave an ultimatum: Surrender to him or lose the new airbenders, Korra meditated into the spirit realm, she expressed her wish to call upon Aang's spirit and ask his advice in saving the new Air Nomads. Iroh's spirit assured her that, even though Aang was no longer able to guide her, she could ask one of Aang's closest friends: Lord Zuko.

=== Appearances in other media ===
==== Games ====
Aang's character appeared in the Avatar: The Last Airbender Trading Card Game on a multitude of cards. He appeared in the Avatar: The Last Airbender video game as one of the four playable characters. Two sequels were made: Avatar: The Last Airbender – The Burning Earth, followed by Avatar: The Last Airbender – Into the Inferno. Aang also appeared in Escape from the Spirit World, an online video game found on Nickelodeon's official website. The game includes certain plot changes that are not shown in the show. The show's directors, Michael DiMartino and Bryan Konietzko, claim the events are canon.

Aang is also a playable character in Nickelodeon crossover titles such as Nicktoons Nitro, Nickelodeon Kart Racers 2: Grand Prix, and the Nickelodeon Super Brawl series, including Nickelodeon All-Star Brawl and its sequel.

On April 12, 2024, Aang was released as a skin in the video game Fortnite. Aang is set to appear as a playable character via downloadable content in Sonic Racing: CrossWorlds.

==== Films ====
Tokyopop has published a films comic (sometimes referred to as cine-manga), in which Aang, being the main character of the show, appears repeatedly.

In 2010, director M. Night Shyamalan cast 12-year-old Tae Kwon Do practitioner Noah Ringer as Aang in the film adaptation of the series, The Last Airbender. His name in the film is pronounced [ɑŋ] instead of [eəŋ]. The casting of a presumed white actor in the role of Aang (as well as a primarily Caucasian cast) in the Asian-influenced Avatar universe triggered negative reactions from some fans, marked by accusations of racism, a letter-writing campaign, and a protest outside of a Philadelphia casting call for movie extras. The casting decisions were also negatively received by several critics, who stated that the original casting call expressed a preference for Caucasian actors over others. Noah Ringer later identified himself to Entertainment Weekly as an American Indian.

== Creation and conception ==
Aang's character was developed from a drawing by Bryan Konietzko of a "balding human man in his forties wearing a futuristic outfit" based on Michael Dante DiMartino's appearance with an arrow design on his head. Konietzko later developed this man into a child with a flying bison. Meanwhile, DiMartino was interested in a documentary about explorers trapped in the South Pole, which he later combined with Konietzko's drawing.

There's an air guy along with these water people trapped in a snowy wasteland...and maybe some fire people are pressing down on them...

— Michael Dante DiMartino and Bryan Konietzko

The plot they described corresponds with the first and second episodes of Avatar: The Last Airbender, where the "water people" (Katara and Sokka) rescue the "air guy" (Aang) while "trapped in a snowy wasteland" (the Southern Water Tribe) with "some fire people [that] are pressing down on them" (Zuko and the Fire Nation troops). The creators of the show intended for Aang to be trapped in an iceberg for one thousand years, later to wake up to a futuristic world, wherein he would have a robot named Momo and a dozen flying bison. The creators eventually lost interest in this science fiction theme and changed it to an Asian-inspired fantasy world. Aang was changed to being stuck in a hundred years of suspended animation, his bald head was explained away by him hailing from a culture inspired by Buddhist monks, the robotic Momo became a flying lemur, and the herd of bison was reduced to one.

The show's distinctive art style was also influenced by anime, particularly the series FLCL (Fooly Cooly), which the creators have cited as an influence. Director Giancarlo Volpe has stated members of his staff "were all ordered to buy FLCL and watch every single episode of it." Aang's design language shares a clear lineage with the stylized, expressive characters of that series. The official art book explicitly notes that Aang's design was based on FLCL's protagonist, Naota Nandaba. Commentators and fans have also noted broader similarities between the two characters, including having a strong physical resemblance, personality, and sharing thematic struggles with childhood trauma and the pressures of prematurely assuming great powers and responsibility.

In the episode "Tales of Ba Sing Se", Aang's name was written as 安昂 (ān áng) in Chinese.

The creators and writers stated that they had originally intended for Aang to let go of his attachment to Katara in order to unlock new airbending abilities. However, this plot point was later abandoned, as Aang ultimately never lets go of his attachment to her. Although he achieves mastery over the Avatar State after accidentally hitting a rock, he does not gain any new airbending abilities. The concept was later reused for the character of Zaheer in The Legend of Korra.

=== Personality and characteristics ===
Michael Dante DiMartino, the show's co-creator, said:

We wanted Aang to solve problems and defeat enemies with his wits as well as his powerful abilities.

— Michael Dante DiMartino

According to the show's creators, "Buddhism and Taoism have been huge inspirations behind the idea for Avatar." As shown in "The King of Omashu" and "The Headband", a notable aspect of Aang's character is his vegetarian diet, which is consistent with Buddhism, Hinduism, and Taoism. In the Brahmajala Sutra, a Buddhist code of ethics, vegetarianism is encouraged. Furthermore, the writers gave Aang a consistent reluctance to fight and an aversion to killing. In "The Spirit World (Winter Solstice, Part 1)", Aang encounters an angry spirit destroying a village and kidnapping villagers; but instead of fighting the spirit, Aang negotiates. He is also depicted showing ethical reluctance in killing the Phoenix King, and eventually strips Ozai of his bending instead of murdering him.

=== Bending the elements ===
As the Avatar, Aang is capable of bending all four elements (air, water, earth and fire). The series' creators consulted a professional martial artist in the design of the show's fighting style; each of these styles' philosophies and set movements corresponds to a specific "bending arts".

The creators made bending a natural extension of consistent limitations and rules of the world. Everything in Avatar's world, whether it be clothing, culture or infrastructure, is influenced by bending. The City of Omashu uses a complex system of gravity and earthbending to transport supplies. The Water Tribes were a naval superpower: their buildings are made of ice and used waterbending as mechanisms for their walls and gates. Airbenders built temples atop high mountains and cliffs that could only be easily reached by Airbending and they have a hermetic ideology to reflect this isolation. The Fire Nation were the first to industrialize due to their ability to generate power and master metallurgy with their bending of fire and lightning.

At the start of the series, Aang is initially only proficient in air, having been able to bend it with ease since he was a young child. Through the teaching of Katara and Zuko, he gradually learns waterbending and firebending; but struggles with Toph's teachings of earthbending due to its rigid nature conflicting with his desire for freedom. Aang utilizes all elements equally, but heavily favors airbending for crowd control and non-lethal purposes, in accordance with his pacifism principles.

- Airbending: The bending art Aang primarily uses in the entire franchise, is a Southern Temple Style based on an "internal" Chinese martial art called Baguazhang. Aang is the only person in living memory to have mastered this form of airbending, and would later pass down this knowledge to his son, Tenzin, who with the aid of Korra, would prove instrumental in the reconstruction and preservation of Air Nomad oral and intangible cultural heritage. Due to the genocide of his people, all other "styles of airbending arts" have been forever lost to history. This fighting style focuses on circular movements, and does not have many finishing moves; traits meant to represent the unpredictability of air and the peaceful character of Airbenders. Airbending represents the element of freedom, and is categorized as the most elusive of the "four bending arts". Airbending utilizes negative jing, which involves retreating and dodging attacks. Airbending involves "smooth coiling and uncoiling actions"; dynamic footwork, throws, and open-handed techniques; and swift, evasive maneuvers designed to evoke the "intangibility and explosive power of wind". These techniques are intended to increase the difficulty for opponents to attack directly or land a lethal blow—allowing airbenders to defend themselves while also protecting their attacker from injury—a pacifist-philosophy that is prevalent among the Air Nomad people. Airbending lacks "finishing moves" or effective methods for permanently disabling foes, a weakness frequently exploited by opponents.
- Waterbending: Waterbending is the bending art Katara, later Pakku, teaches Aang in the series, which is based on Chinese martial arts techniques of "internal style" tai chi and Jeet Kune Do. When Aang traveled north, he learned Northern Tribe Yin-style. During The Legend of Korra, Katara is the only Master of "Southern Tribe Yang-style", forced to reconstruct the style from surviving manuscripts; all other masters were killed, their collective knowledge confiscated or destroyed by the Fire Nation. Waterbending represents the element of change—a shapeshifter constantly changing forms—and is categorized as the most adaptive or pliable of the "four bending arts". Waterbending emphasizes "softness and breathing" over "hard aggression"; fluid and graceful, acting in concert with the environment; creating opportunities where none exist; this "flow of energy" allows their defensive maneuvers to translate into focus on control and counter-offenses, turning their opponents' momentum against them. Despite these advantages, Waterbending is almost entirely dependent on inertia; it is essential for practitioners to not be rigid, but to be fluid and able to adapt to any situation.
- Earthbending: Earthbending is the martial art Toph teaches Aang in the series, which is based on Chinese martial arts techniques of Hung Ga and Southern Praying Mantis. Earthbending represents the element of substance. Toph's earthbending style is Chu Gar Praying Mantis, as opposed to the more common Hung Gar, taught to her by the original earthbenders, badgermoles. Earthbending is categorized as the most diverse and enduring of the "four bending arts". Earthbending is the geokinetic ability to manipulate earth, rock, sand, lava, mud, and metals in all their various forms. Earthbending utilizes neutral jing, which involves waiting and listening for the right moment to act decisively. Earthbending involves enduring attacks until the right opportunity to counterattack reveals itself, emphasizes "heavily rooted stances and strong blows that evoke the mass and power of earth", and demands precise stepping footwork to maintain constant contact with the ground. Earthbending parallels Five Animals movements (such as the tiger's hard blows and the crane's affinity to landing gracefully). Earthbending is at its strongest when the feet or hand are in direct contact with the ground, enabling earthbenders to transfer their kinetic energies into their bending for fast and powerful moves. This reliance on direct contact with the earth is a literal Achilles' heel; separating earthbenders from any contact with the earth renders them ineffective.
- Firebending: Firebending is the martial art Zuko teaches Aang in the series, which is based on Chinese martial arts techniques of changquan, Shaolin kung fu, Southern Dragon kung fu and xingyiquan. Firebending represents the element of power—desire and will paired with energy to achieve it, a philosophy reflected in firebending's unique capability for its users to generate their central element, rather than manipulating already present sources. Firebenders use breath control to manipulate chi in their own bodies and convert the energy from breathing into fire once it exits the body. A century of warfare have corrupted the Fire Nation's rich culture, and with it, their firebending-styles "regressed" into militarized format based on hatred and raw aggression; Zuko and Aang sought to learn firebending in its purest and most harmonious form, and rediscovered Dancing Dragon Style from the last surviving dragons. Dragon Style is the bending art first practiced by the Sun Warriors, the earliest incarnation of the modern Fire Nation; for the Sun Warriors, fire is life, energy, and creativity, rather than destruction and hate. Firebending is categorized as the most determined and powerful of the "four bending arts". All Firebending styles emphasize initiative and speed, overwhelming their opponents with powerful jabs and kicks that hurl fire before building to an explosive finishing move, mirroring the vitality and explosive power of fire. This is often seen in the "Agni Kai" or fire-duels that Zuko competes in. A master firebender will confidently control fire, rather than allowing their energy to become unfocused rage. A select few high-level firebenders can access highly destructive and lethal skills, such as lightning-bending and combustion-bending. Firebending's offensive power comes with a trade-off: a lack of blocks or evasive maneuvers, particularly when facing other elements.
- Energybending: Aang learned about energybending from the last living lion turtle, as he did not wish to kill Ozai, and was given the ability to do so. He is able to use energybending to connect with his inner spirit and gain cosmic energy from the universe. In The Legend of Korra, Aang gave Avatar Korra, the current Avatar, the ability to energybend, which was used to restore people's bending abilities after Amon removed them using bloodbending.

=== The Avatar State ===
The Avatars (from right to left): Aang, Roku, Kyoshi, Kuruk, Yangchen, Szeto, and other previous Avatars.

As the Avatar, Aang serves as a bridge between "Material World" and the "Spirit World", the plane of existence where the universe's disembodied spirits dwell. His spirituality training progressed swiftly, granting visions and access to the various memories from his past lives.

Like his predecessors, his most powerful ability is the Avatar State, in which he receives a massive boost in raw power from the cosmic energy, enabling him to easily overcome any opponent that tries to fight him head-on. In addition, this state allows him to access bending techniques he would not have learned during his own lifetime but throughout those of his past lives. If he is killed in the Avatar State, then this would cause the Avatar to cease being reincarnated and end the Avatar Cycle.

== Critical reception ==
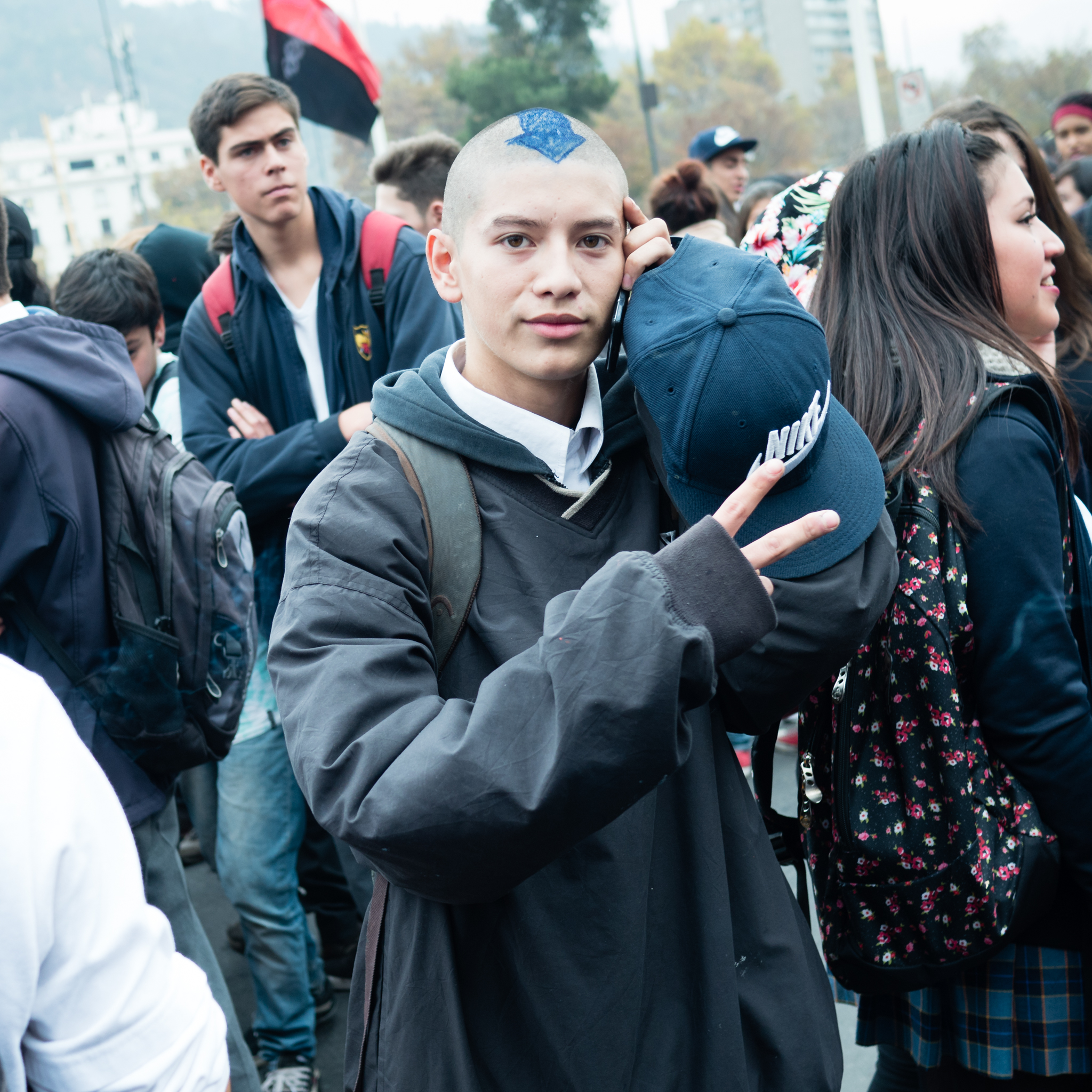
Student cosplaying as Aang during an anarchist student strike

Aang was well received by critics and fans. Kendall Lyons stated, "Aang seems to be the lighthearted kid that you can easily familiarize yourself with", and that he "seems to bring comfort in the most dangerous or hostile situations." There are many similar descriptions about Aang as a childlike character who is "reckless and excitable". Reviews point out that "as the Avatar, Aang seems unstoppable, but as Aang, he is just another Airbender"; the review states later that the show continues to focus on a more realistic character instead of a perfect one by revealing many character flaws.

In 2016, Screen Rant ranked Aang #15 on its "30 Best Animated TV Characters Of All Time" list.

At the 2020 Tokyo Summer Olympics, Dutch windsurfer Kiran Badloe won the gold medal in Men's RS: X while having a blue arrow haircut inspired by Aang's design.

== Family tree ==
Water Tribe–Air Nomad family trees

Hakoda's father	Kanna	Pakku
Hakoda	Kya	Avatar Cycle (Note: Aang and Korra are both parts of Avatar Cycle of reincarnation, with Korra immediately following Aang.)
Sokka	Katara	Avatar Aang	Korra's grandparents
Bumi	Kya	Pema	Tenzin	Senna	Tonraq	Unalaq	Malina
Jinora	Ikki	Meelo	Rohan	Avatar Korra	Desna	Eska

Color key:
Color	Description
	Water Tribe and Waterbenders
	Air Nomads, Air Acolytes, and Airbenders
