= List of actors who have played animated characters =

The following is a list of actors who have played animated characters. There have been several live action films based on animated series. This list indicates which actors represented the animated characters in the live performance. This is not a list of voice actors playing animated characters.

The list is sorted by the original animated series, with major characters from the series listed in order of importance. Live action actors are listed in chronological order.

== 101 Dalmatians characters ==
Character	Actor/actress
Cruella de Vil	Glenn Close, 101 Dalmatians (1996), 102 Dalmatians (2000); Emma Stone, Cruella (2021)
Jasper	Hugh Laurie, 101 Dalmatians (1996); Joel Fry, Cruella (2021)
Horace	Mark Williams, 101 Dalmatians (1996); Paul Walter Hauser, Cruella (2021)
Roger	Jeff Daniels, 101 Dalmatians (1996); Kayvan Novak, Cruella (2021)
Anita	Joely Richardson, 101 Dalmatians (1996); Kirby Howell-Baptiste, Cruella (2021)
Nanny	Joan Plowright, 101 Dalmatians (1996)

== Alvin and the Chipmunks characters ==
Character	Actor/actress
Dave Seville	Jason Lee, Alvin and the Chipmunks (2007), Alvin and the Chipmunks: The Squeakquel (2009), Alvin and the Chipmunks: Chipwrecked (2011), Alvin and the Chipmunks: The Road Chip (2015)

== Avatar: The Last Airbender characters ==
Character	Actor/actress
Aang	Noah Ringer, The Last Airbender (2010); Gordon Cormier, Avatar: The Last Airbender (2024)
Katara	Nicola Peltz, The Last Airbender (2010); Kiawentiio, Avatar: The Last Airbender (2024)
Sokka	Jackson Rathbone, The Last Airbender (2010); Ian Ousley, Avatar: The Last Airbender (2024)
Zuko	Dev Patel, The Last Airbender (2010); Dallas Liu, Avatar: The Last Airbender (2024)
Admiral Zhao	Aasif Mandvi, The Last Airbender (2010); Ken Leung, Avatar: The Last Airbender (2024)
Iroh	Shaun Toub, The Last Airbender (2010); Paul Sun-Hyung Lee, Avatar: The Last Airbender (2024)
Toph Beifong	Miya Cech, Avatar: The Last Airbender (2024)
Fire Lord Ozai	Cliff Curtis, The Last Airbender (2010); Daniel Dae Kim, Avatar: The Last Airbender (2024)
Suki	Jessica Andres, The Last Airbender (2010); Maria Zhang, Avatar: The Last Airbender (2024)
Princess Yue	Seychelle Gabriel, The Last Airbender (2010); Amber Midthunder, Avatar: The Last Airbender (2024)
Kanna	Katharine Houghton, The Last Airbender (2010)

== Ben 10 characters ==
Character	Actor/actress
Ben Tennyson / Ben 10	Graham Phillips, Ben 10: Race Against Time (2007); Ryan Kelley, Ben 10: Alien Swarm (2009)
Gwen Tennyson	Haley Ramm, Ben 10: Race Against Time (2007); Galadriel Stineman, Ben 10: Alien Swarm (2009)
Max Tennyson	Lee Majors, Ben 10: Race Against Time (2007); Barry Corbin, Ben 10: Alien Swarm (2009)
JT	Tyler Foden, Ben 10: Race Against Time (2007)
Cash	Tyler Patrick Jones, Ben 10: Race Against Time (2007)
Kevin Levin	Nathan Keyes, Ben 10: Alien Swarm (2009)

== Dragon Ball characters ==
Character	Actor/actress
Goku	Justin Chatwin, Dragonball Evolution (2009)
Master Roshi	Chow Yun-fat, Dragonball Evolution (2009)
Bulma	Emmy Rossum, Dragonball Evolution (2009)
Chi-Chi	Jamie Chung, Dragonball Evolution (2009)
King Piccolo	James Marsters, Dragonball Evolution (2009)
Yamcha	Joon Park, Dragonball Evolution (2009)
Mai	Eriko Tamura, Dragonball Evolution (2009)
Grandpa Gohan	Randall Duk Kim, Dragonball Evolution (2009)

== The Fairly OddParents characters ==
Character	Actor/actress
Timmy Turner	Drake Bell, A Fairly Odd Movie: Grow Up, Timmy Turner! (2011), A Fairly Odd Christmas (2012), A Fairly Odd Summer (2014)
Cosmo and Wanda	Jason Alexander (as Cosmo), A Fairly Odd Movie: Grow Up, Timmy Turner! (2011), A Fairly Odd Christmas (2012), A Fairly Odd Summer (2014); Cheryl Hines (as Wanda), A Fairly Odd Movie: Grow Up, Timmy Turner! (2011), A Fairly Odd Christmas (2012), A Fairly Odd Summer (2014)
Tootie	Daniella Monet, A Fairly Odd Movie: Grow Up, Timmy Turner! (2011), A Fairly Odd Christmas (2012), A Fairly Odd Summer (2014)
Denzel Crocker	Steve Schirripa, A Fairly Odd Movie: Grow Up, Timmy Turner! (2011), A Fairly Odd Christmas (2012), A Fairly Odd Summer (2014)
A.J.	Jesse Reid, A Fairly Odd Movie: Grow Up, Timmy Turner! (2011)
Vicky	Devon Weigel, A Fairly Odd Movie: Grow Up, Timmy Turner! (2011)

== Fat Albert and the Cosby Kids characters ==
Character	Actor/actress
Fat Albert	Kenan Thompson, Fat Albert (2004)
Dumb Donald	Marques Houston, Fat Albert (2004)
Mushmouth	Jermaine Williams, Fat Albert (2004)
Weird Harold	Aaron A.Frazier, Fat Albert (2004)
Bucky	Alphonso McAuely, Fat Albert (2004)
Rudy Davis	Shedrack Anderson III, Fat Albert (2004)

== The Flintstones characters ==
Character	Actor/actress
Fred Flintstone	John Goodman, The Flintstones (1994); Mark Addy, The Flintstones in Viva Rock Vegas (2000)
Barney Rubble	Rick Moranis, The Flintstones (1994); Stephen Baldwin, The Flintstones in Viva Rock Vegas (2000)
Wilma Flintstone	Elizabeth Perkins, The Flintstones (1994); Kristen Johnston, The Flintstones in Viva Rock Vegas (2000)
Betty Rubble	Rosie O'Donnell, The Flintstones (1994); Jane Krakowski, The Flintstones in Viva Rock Vegas (2000)
Pearl Slaghoople	Elizabeth Taylor, The Flintstones (1994); Joan Collins, The Flintstones in Viva Rock Vegas (2000)
Mr. Slate	Dann Florek, The Flintstones (1994)
Pebbles Flintstone	Elaine and Melanie Silver, The Flintstones (1994)
Bamm-Bamm Rubble	Hlynur and Marinó Sigurðsson, The Flintstones (1994); Elizabeth Daily (voice), The Flintstones (1994)
The Great Gazoo	Alan Cumming, The Flintstones in Viva Rock Vegas (2000)

== George of the Jungle characters ==
Character	Actor/actress
George	Brendan Fraser, George of the Jungle (1997); Christopher Showerman, George of the Jungle 2 (2003)

== Inspector Gadget characters ==
Character	Actor/actress
Inspector Gadget	Matthew Broderick, Inspector Gadget (1999); French Stewart, Inspector Gadget 2 (2003)
Doctor Claw	Rupert Everett, Inspector Gadget (1999); Tony Martin, Inspector Gadget 2 (2003)
Penny	Michelle Trachtenberg, Inspector Gadget (1999); Caitlin Wachs, Inspector Gadget 2 (2003)
Chief Quimby	Dabney Coleman, Inspector Gadget (1999); Mark Mitchell, Inspector Gadget 2 (2003)
Gadgetmobile	D.L. Hughley, Inspector Gadget (1999), Inspector Gadget 2 (2003)

== Kim Possible characters ==
Character	Actor/actress
Kim Possible	Sadie Stanley, Kim Possible (2019)
Ron Stoppable	Sean Giambrone, Kim Possible (2019)
Shego	Taylor Ortega, Kim Possible (2019)
Nana Impossible	Connie Ray, Kim Possible (2019)
Wade	Isaac Ryan Brown, Kim Possible (2019)
Dr. Ann Possible	Alyson Hannigan, Kim Possible (2019)
James Timothy Possible	Matthew Clarke, Kim Possible (2019)

== Lilo & Stitch characters ==
Character	Actor/actress
Lilo Pelekai	Maia Kealoha, Lilo & Stitch (2025)
Nani Pelekai	Sydney Elizebeth Agudong, Lilo & Stitch (2025)
Cobra Bubbles	Courtney B. Vance, Lilo & Stitch (2025)
David Kawena	Kaipo Dudoit, Lilo & Stitch (2025)

== Masters of the Universe characters ==
Character	Actor/actress
He-Man	Dolph Lundgren, Masters of the Universe (1987)
Skeletor	Frank Langella, Masters of the Universe (1987)
Evil-Lyn	Meg Foster, Masters of the Universe (1987)
Man-At-Arms	Jon Cypher, Masters of the Universe (1987)
Teela	Chelsea Field, Masters of the Universe (1987)
Sorceress of Castle Grayskull	Christina Pickles, Masters of the Universe (1987)
Beast Man	Tony Carroll, Masters of the Universe (1987)

== Mr. Magoo characters ==
Character	Actor/actress
Mr. Magoo	Leslie Nielsen, Mr. Magoo (1997)
Waldo	Matt Keeslar, Mr. Magoo (1997)

== Popeye characters ==
Character	Actor/actress
Popeye	Robin Williams, Popeye (1980)
Olive Oyl	Shelley Duvall, Popeye (1980)
Poopdeck Pappy	Ray Walston, Popeye (1980)
Bluto	Paul L. Smith, Popeye (1980)
Wimpy	Paul Dooley, Popeye (1980)
Geezil	Richard Libertini
Castor Oyl	Donovan Scott, Popeye (1980)
Ham Gravy	Bill Irwin, Popeye (1980)
Swee'Pea	Wesley Ivan Hurt, Popeye (1980)

== The Rocky and Bullwinkle Show characters ==
Character	Actor/actress
Natasha Fatale	Sally Kellerman, Boris and Natasha: The Movie (1992); Rene Russo, The Adventures of Rocky and Bullwinkle (2000)
Boris Badenov	Dave Thomas, Boris and Natasha: The Movie (1992); Jason Alexander, The Adventures of Rocky and Bullwinkle (2000)
Fearless Leader	Christopher Nearne, Boris and Natasha: The Movie (1992); Robert De Niro, The Adventures of Rocky and Bullwinkle (2000)
Dudley Do-Right	Brendan Fraser, Dudley Do-Right (1999)
Nell Fenwick	Sarah Jessica Parker, Dudley Do-Right (1999)
Snidely Whiplash	Alfred Molina, Dudley Do-Right (1999)
Inspector Fenwick	Robert Prosky, Dudley Do-Right (1999)

== Scooby-Doo characters ==
Character	Actor/actress
Freddy Jones	Freddie Prinze Jr., Scooby-Doo (2002), Scooby-Doo 2: Monsters Unleashed (2004); Robbie Amell, Scooby-Doo! The Mystery Begins (2009), Scooby-Doo! Curse of the Lake Monster (2010)
Daphne Blake	Sarah Michelle Gellar, Scooby-Doo (2002), Scooby-Doo 2: Monsters Unleashed (2004); Kate Melton, Scooby-Doo! The Mystery Begins (2009), Scooby-Doo! Curse of the Lake Monster (2010)
Shaggy Rogers	Matthew Lillard, Scooby-Doo (2002), Scooby-Doo 2: Monsters Unleashed (2004); Nick Palatas, Scooby-Doo! The Mystery Begins (2009), Scooby-Doo! Curse of the Lake Monster (2010)
Velma Dinkley	Linda Cardellini, Scooby-Doo (2002), Scooby-Doo 2: Monsters Unleashed (2004); Hayley Kiyoko, Scooby-Doo! The Mystery Begins (2009), Scooby-Doo! Curse of the Lake Monster (2010)

== The Smurfs characters ==
Character	Actor/actress
Gargamel	Hank Azaria, The Smurfs (2011), The Smurfs 2 (2013)

== Underdog characters ==
Character	Actor/actress
Simon Bar Sinister	Peter Dinklage, Underdog (2007)
Cad Lakey	Patrick Warburton, Underdog (2007)

== Winx Club characters ==
Character	Actor/actress
Bloom	Abigail Cowen, Fate: The Winx Saga (TV series, 2021)
Stella	Hannah van der Westhuysen, Fate: The Winx Saga (TV series, 2021)
Aisha	Precious Mustapha, Fate: The Winx Saga (TV series, 2021)

== Yogi Bear characters ==
Character	Actor/actress
Yogi Bear	Dan Aykroyd, Yogi Bear (2010)
Boo-Boo Bear	Justin Timberlake, Yogi Bear (2010)
Ranger Smith	Tom Cavanagh, Yogi Bear (2010)

== See also ==
- List of voice actors
- List of live-action films based on cartoons and comics
