= Emi =

- Pronunciation: [eꜜmi]
- Gender: Female

Origin
- Origin: Japanese
- Meaning: Different meanings depending on the kanji used.
- Region of origin: Japan

Other names
- Related names: Emiko

Emi (えみ, エミ, 絵美, 恵美) is a feminine Japanese given name and is occasionally used as a surname.

== Written forms ==
Emi can be written using different kanji characters and can mean:

as a given name

- 恵美, "blessing, beauty"
- 絵美, "picture, beauty"
- 映見, "reflect, look"
- 映美, "reflect, beauty"
- 笑, "smile"
- 栄美, "prosperous, beauty"
- 恵未, "blessing, not yet"
- 恵実, "blessing, fruit"
- 慧美, "wisdom, beauty"

The given name can also be written in hiragana or katakana.

as a surname

- 江見, "bay, look"
- 江美, "bay, beauty"

== People with the name ==
- Emi Akimoto (秋元 恵美; born 1956), Japanese hurdler
- Emi Fujino (藤野 恵実; born 1980), Japanese mixed martial artist
- Emi Fujita (恵美; born 1963), Japanese singer
- Emi Hashino (恵美; born 1973), Japanese comedian and stage actress
- Emi Hinouchi (エミ; born 1982), Japanese urban music singer-songwriter
- Emi Inui (絵美; born 1983), Japanese softball player
- Emi Kaneko (恵美; born 1965), Japanese politician
- Emi Kawabata (川端 絵美; born 1970), Japanese skier
- Emi Kobayashi (恵美; born 1983), Japanese gravure idol
- Emi Kuroda (エミ; born 1978), Japanese actress
- Emi Lo (born 1991), non-binary Taiwanese-Chinese-American voice actor
- Emi Matsui (江美; born 1963), Japanese javelin thrower
- Emi Morimoto (born 1981), Japanese drummer
- Emi Motoi (えみ), Japanese voice actress
- Emi Motokawa (恵美), Japanese professional wrestler
- Emi Nakajima (中島 依美; born 1990), Japanese women's footballer
- Emi Nitta (恵海; born 1985), Japanese voice actress and singer
- Emi Nonaka (絵美)(born 1984), Japanese ice hockey player
- Emi Shimizu (清水 絵美; born 1990), Japanese curler
- Emi Shinohara (恵美; born 1963), Japanese voice actress
- Emi Suzuki (えみ; born 1985), Chinese-Japanese actress and fashion model
- Emi Tawata (えみ; born 1984), Japanese singer
- Emi Uwagawa (恵美), Japanese voice actress
- Emi Wada (惠美; born 1937), Japanese costume designer
- Emi Wakui (映見; born 1970), Japanese actress
- Emi Watanabe (絵美; born 1958), Japanese figure skater
- Emi Wong (王樂婷, born 1992), Hong Kong YouTuber
- Emi Yamamoto (山本 絵美; born 1982), Japanese women's footballer

== Fictional characters ==
- Emi Isuzu (絵美), a character in the Tenjho Tenge series
- Emi Ibarazaki (茨崎 笑美), a character in the visual novel Katawa Shoujo
- Emi Yusa, a character in the anime and manga The Devil is a Part-Timer!
- Emi Toshiba, a background character in Konami's Dance Dance Revolution dance game series
- Emi Sendo, a character in the anime Cardfight!! Vanguard
- Emi Aobe, a character in the tokusatsu drama series, Ultraman Blazar
- Emi, the main character of Denshattack!

== See also ==
- Mimasaka-Emi Station, a train station in Mimasaka, Okayama Prefecture, Japan
- Magical Star Magical Emi, a magical girl anime series
- Electro-magnetic interference
