= Emiko =

- Pronunciation: Japanese: [e.mi.ko] English approximation: EH-mee-koh
- Gender: Female

Origin
- Origin: Japanese
- Meaning: Different meanings depending on the kanji used; typically means "blessed" (Emi) + "child" (ko)
- Region of origin: Japan

Other names
- Related names: Emi; Emika; Emina; Emiri

Emiko (えみこ, エミコ) is a feminine Japanese given name.

== Written forms ==
The name Emiko can have a variety of different meanings depending on which kanji characters are used to write it. Some possible variations include:

- 栄美子; "prosperous, beauty, child"
- 恵美子; "blessing, favor, beauty, child"
- 絵美子; "picture, beauty, child"
- 英美子; "superior, beauty, child"
- 映海子; "shine, sea, child"
- 笑子; "laugh/smile, child"
- 愛実子; "love, fruit, child"

The name may also be written in hiragana or katakana.

== People ==
- Emiko Davies, Australia-born cookery book author, food journalist and food blogger
- Emiko Hiyama (肥山 詠美子; born 1971), Japanese computational nuclear physicist
- Emiko Iiyama (飯山 恵巳子; born 1934), Japanese soprano
- Emiko Iwasaki (岩崎 恵美子; born 1976), Japanese video game artist
- Emiko Kado (門 恵美子; 1976–1999), Japanese professional wrestler
- Emiko Kaminuma (上沼 恵美子; born 1955), Japanese comedian, singer, television presenter, YouTuber, and radio personality
- Emiko Kanda (神田 絵美子), Japanese former international table tennis player
- Emiko Komaru (香丸 恵美子; born 1946), Japanese track and field athlete
- Emiko Kubo (久保 恵美子; born 1966), Japanese former football player
- Emiko Miyamoto (宮本 恵美子; 1937–2023), Japanese volleyball player
- Emiko Nakagawa (中川 笑子; born 1941), Japanese chess player
- Emiko Nakano (1925–1990), American abstract expressionist artist, of American–Japanese decent.
- Emiko Odaka (小高 笑子; born 1962), Japanese former volleyball player
- Emiko Ohba (大場 恵美子), Japanese table tennis player
- Emiko Ohnuki-Tierney (大貫 恵美子; born 1934), American anthropologist
- Emiko Okagawa (岡川 恵美子; born 1964), Japanese former professional tennis player
- Emiko Okazaki (岡崎 恵美子; born 1949), Japanese alpine skier
- Emiko Okuyama (奥山 恵美子; born 1951), Japanese politician
- Emiko Omori (born 1940), American cinematographer and film director
- Emiko Raika (来家 恵美子; born 1975), Japanese female professional boxer and mixed martial artist
- Emiko Sato (佐藤 恵美子; born 1971), Japanese cross-country skier
- Emiko Shinohara (篠原 恵美子; 1963–2024), Japanese voice actress
- Emiko Shiratori (白鳥 英美子; born 1950), Japanese singer and songwriter
- Emiko Suzuki (鈴木 絵美子; born 1981), Japanese synchronized swimmer
- Emiko Taguchi (田口 恵美子; born 1951), Japanese speed skater
- Emiko Uematsu (植松 恵美子; born 1967), Japanese politician
- Emiko Ueno (植野 恵美子; born 1957), Japanese badminton player
- Emiko Yagumo (八雲 恵美子; 1903–1979), Japanese silent film actress
- Emiko Yamashita (山下 恵美子; born 1953), Japanese former handball player

== Fictional characters ==
- Emiko Niwa (丹羽 笑子), a character in the manga series D.N.Angel
- Emiko Yamane (山根 恵美子), a character in the 1954 film Godzilla
- Emiko, a main character in the science fiction novel The Windup Girl
- Emiko Queen, a character from DC Comics
- Emiko Yureimoto (幽霊元 恵美子), a character from the webtoon Erma
