= Emily Wong =

Emily Wong may refer to:

- Emily Wong (singer) (born 1990), Chinese Cantopop singer and actress
- Emily Wong (soccer) (born 2007), Canadian soccer player
- Emi Wong (born 1992), Hong Kong YouTuber

== See also ==
- Emme Wong (born 1981), Hong Kong Cantopop singer and actress
