= Momona Tamada =

Canadian actress (born 2006)

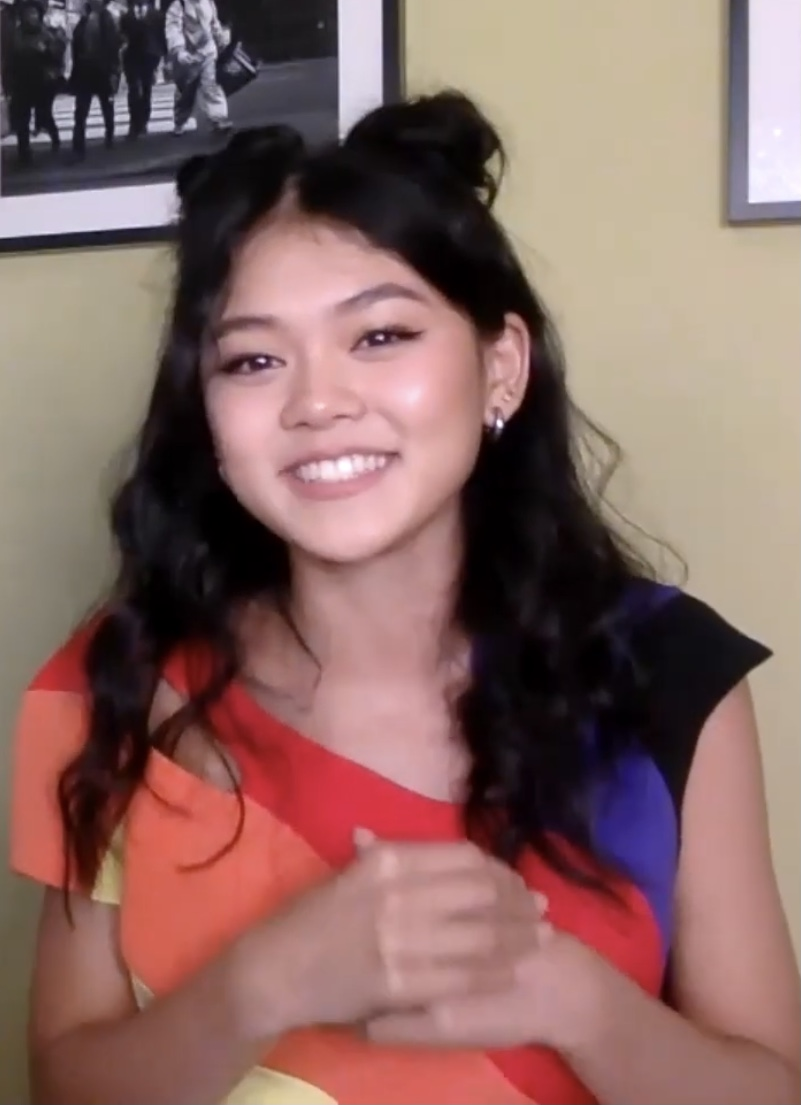
- Tamada in 2022
- Born: September 28, 2006 (age 20); Vancouver, British Columbia, Canada
- Occupation: Actress
- Years active: 2019–present
- Notable work: Avatar: The Last Airbender; The Baby-Sitters Club

Japanese name
- Kanji: 玉田 百々渚
- Hiragana: たまだ ももな
- Katakana: タマダ モモナ
- Literal meaning: [A] hundred beaches
Transcriptions
- Romanization: Tamada Momona

Momona Tamada (Japanese: 玉田 百々渚, Hepburn: Tamada Momona; born September 28, 2006) is a Canadian actress known for her role as Claudia Kishi in the television adaptation of The Baby-Sitters Club and her role as Ty Lee in the 2024 live-action adaptation of Avatar: The Last Airbender.

== Early life ==
Momona Tamada was born on September 28, 2006, to Japanese parents in Vancouver, British Columbia. Tamada also has a younger brother named Hiro. She and her brother are first generation-born Canadian, born to Issei parents, and is fluent in both English and Japanese. Her name, which means 'hundreds of beaches', was inspired by the beaches of Vancouver.

== Career ==
On July 26, 2019, Tamada made her debut as the younger version of Kimiko Miyashiro, "The Female", in the series The Boys, in the sixth episode of the first season. Later in 2019, she appeared in an episode of The Terror, as Kazu's great-granddaughter.

In 2020, it was announced that Tamada would be playing the role of Claudia Kishi in the 2020 adaptation of The Baby-Sitters Club.

In September 2022, it was announced that she was cast as Ty Lee in the 2024 adaptation of Avatar: The Last Airbender. In October 2022, she signed with Echo Lake Entertainment. In November 2022, she joined the cast of The Spiderwick Chronicles as the character Emiko.

In August 2026, was announced that she will star in the film Hidden Heroes: A Descendants Story, from the Descendants film series, as Zara, the daughter of Yzma from The Emperor's New Groove.

== Personal life ==
Since age 4, Tamada was a competitive dancer. Her fondness for reading in general and The Baby-Sitters Club at an early age prompted her to audition for the role of Claudia Kishi, which she successfully received in the 2020 television adaptation of the same name. Due to her receiving the role, she promptly switched to online school.

== Filmography ==
=== Film ===
| Year(s) | Title | Role(s) | Notes |
|---|---|---|---|
| 2020 | To All the Boys: P.S. I Still Love You | Young Lara Jean | |
| 2020 | The Main Event | Erica | |
| 2020 | A Babysitter's Guide to Monster Hunting | Babysitter from Japan | |
| 2021 | To All the Boys: Always and Forever | Young Lara Jean | |
| 2022 | Secret Headquarters | Maya | |
| 2027 | Hidden Heroes: A Descendants Story | Zara | |

=== Television ===
| Year(s) | Title | Role(s) | Notes |
|---|---|---|---|
| 2019 | The Boys | Young Kimiko Miyashiro/"The Female" | 1 episode |
| 2019 | The Terror | Kazu's great-granddaughter | 1 episode |
| 2020 | Gabby Duran & The Unsittables | Dancer | 1 episode |
| 2020–2021 | The Baby-Sitters Club | Claudia Kishi | Main role |
| 2022 | Super PupZ | Emma | 10 episodes |
| 2022 | Oni: Thunder God's Tale | Onari | Voice role |
| 2024–present | Avatar: The Last Airbender | Ty Lee | Recurring role (season 1); main role (season 2) |
| 2024 | The Spiderwick Chronicles | Emiko | 6 episodes |
| 2025 | Happy Face | Eva | Recurring role |

=== Video Games ===
| Year(s) | Title | Role(s) | Notes |
|---|---|---|---|
| 2025 | Assassin's Creed Shadows | Oni-Yuri | Voice role |
| 2026 | Forza Horizon 6 | Mei Hasegawa | Voice role |
