= Planet of Lana II =

- Developer: Wishfully
- Publisher: Thunderful Publishing
- Directors: Adam Stjärnljus; Klas Martin Eriksson
- Designer: Dan Faxe
- Programmer: Mattias Wargren
- Artist: Jimmy Chan
- Writer: Klas Martin Eriksson
- Composer: Takeshi Furukawa
- Engine: Unity
- Platforms: Nintendo Switch; Nintendo Switch 2; PlayStation 4; PlayStation 5; Windows; Xbox One; Xbox Series X/S
- Release: 5 March 2026
- Genre: Puzzle-platform
- Mode: Single-player

Planet of Lana II is a puzzle-platform video game developed by Wishfully and published by Thunderful Publishing. A sequel to Planet of Lana (2023), the game was released for Nintendo Switch, Nintendo Switch 2, PlayStation 4, PlayStation 5, Windows, Xbox One, and Xbox Series X/S.

== Gameplay ==
Similar to its predecessor, Planet of Lana II is a 2D side-scrolling puzzle-platform video game. In the game, Lana must work with her companion, a cat-like creature named Mui, as they explore a planet named Novo. Set two years after the events of the original game, Lana is more experienced and agile, being able to perform feats such as wall jumping, dashing, and sliding. The two characters need to use their own unique skills and cooperate with each other in order to solve puzzles and overcome environmental obstacles that hinder their progress. For instance, Mui can hack into machines and use its telepathic abilities to briefly control other creatures in the world, while Lana can explore underwater.

== Development ==
The game is developed by Swedish studio Wishfully. While Planet of Lana was initially envisioned as a standalone game, the sequel was greenlit as the team wanted to further expand its story and setting with a new game. Creative director Adam Stjärnljus added that Planet of Lana II was a more ambitious project, with a game length that doubled the original's. Following the first alpha build, the team had to remove content from the game to keep it a focused experience. The studio described Lana as a more mature and confident character in the sequel. This created opportunities for the team to design more complex puzzles, a faster movement system, and more diverse gameplay mechanics that emphasized the cooperation between Lana and Mui. Biomes in the game were also designed to be more distinct from one another, with each introducing unique gameplay variations.

The team also added that the story in the game was darker than the original, and that players will meet more non-playable characters and settlements. The various factions in the game adapted to technology in markedly different ways. The Dijinghala, the game's primary antagonist, weaponized it aggressively and used them to ruthlessly exploit the planet's resources. As with the first game, the characters spoke an unintelligible language, and the game relied entirely on music, animation, voice acting and body language of characters to convey its emotions. The developers worked with an expanded animation team led by the Animation Director Olle Engstrom to be able to execute this at the required scale. Takeshi Furukawa, the composer of the original game and The Last Guardian, returned for the sequel.

Wishfully and publisher Thunderful Publishing announced the game in June 2025. A gameplay demo for the game was released in February 2026. It was released on 5 March 2026 for Nintendo Switch, Nintendo Switch 2, PlayStation 4, PlayStation 5, Windows, Xbox One and Xbox Series X/S.

== Reception ==
Reception

Aggregate scores
Aggregator	Score
Metacritic	(NS2) 83/100 (PC) 79/100 (PS5) 83/100 (XSXS) 81/100
OpenCritic	87% recommend (Note: Based on 112 reviews)

Review scores
Publication	Score
Destructoid	8.5/10
GameSpot	8/10
Nintendo Life	9/10

Planet of Lana II received "generally favorable" reviews, according to review aggregator website Metacritic. Fellow review aggregator OpenCritic assessed that the game received strong approval, being recommended by 87% of critics.
