= Erma (webtoon) =

Webcomic by Brandon J. Santiago

- Opening panel of Chapter 1 (WEBTOON Originals version)
- Authors: Brandon J. Santiago; Donovan Tracy Gaiter
- Illustrator: Brandon J. Santiago
- Website: WEBTOON, Tapas
- Current status/schedule: Ongoing, published online daily/weekly
- Launch date: May 28, 2014 (one-shot); January 3, 2016 (Tapas); April 14, 2018 (WEBTOON)
- Syndicates: Tapas; WEBTOON
- Publisher: Outcast Studios
- Genres: Slice of life; Comedy horror
- Rating: 9.80 Stars on WEBTOON

Erma is a comedy horror webtoon and animated web series created by Mexican artist Brandon J. Santiago. It follows the adventures and misadventures of the titular initially six-year-old Erma Williams' experiences as a half-human, half-yōkai/ghost, tending to use her haunting abilities for everyday antics, whether for better or for worse, focusing on themes such as friendship and acceptance. Santiago initially published the webcomic on DeviantArt and Tumblr in May 2014, but has since released it on various services from January 2016, such as Tapas and WEBTOON. It is available in two languages, English and Spanish. In January 2020, Comics Beat reported that with 64.5 million views and 74.9 thousand subscribers, Erma was the most-viewed webcomic on the Tapas syndicate in 2019.

In October 2017, Santiago published a prequel graphic novel to the series titled Spirit's Bloom, as well as two anthology collections of Erma comics, in addition releasing a short film pilot of Erma produced by Outcast Studios. A print collection, Tales of Outcast, was released in March 2019. Other works include the stand-alone Night Detective, Siris, and Warrior Unicorn Princess, and Yokai, an in-universe novel. A picture book, Meet Erma, was released in April 2020. An Erma animated series began releasing to YouTube from July 2024 to present. A Point-and-Click Adventure videogame Erma: The Game, was released on January 30, 2026, on Steam with planned releases for other platforms also planned.

== Overview ==
Erma follows the adventures and misadventures of Erma Williams, a child who lives in the suburbs of the fictional town Blairwood, and has supernatural abilities. The comic focuses on Erma's supernatural life and friendships with her best friends, Amy, Terry and Connor, as well as her babysitter Felicia and fellow Warrior Unicorn Princess fan Sidney. She also deals with a myriad of foes throughout the run of the comic that threaten her and her loved ones, stretching from a demented possessed puppet who wishes to steal Erma's powers to dealing with the issues that plague her maternal family in Japan.

Spirit's Bloom, the prequel graphic novel, focuses on events preceding the main Erma comic, following Erma's parents Sam and Emiko in their younger years and how they met and fall in love as well as Erma's birth. A Sequel, The Harvest, is set to release from the Outcast Studios website sometime in late January to February.

Tales of the Outcast is an anthology, spin-off series that focuses on other notable characters from Erma's world in small side stores. The series first started as an 18-issue (plus a bonus 19th issue that featured concepts and behind-the-scenes drawings) physical release from the outcast website, until it was later changed to become an all-digital comic featured on WEBTOON and Tapas, same as the main comic.

== Characters ==
- Erma Williams: The titular protagonist of the series. She is a half-human/half-yokai hybrid called Hanyō, and daughter of Sam and Emiko.
- Emiko Yureimoto-Williams: Erma's mother, Sam's wife and the fourth child and third daughter of the Yureimoto clan. She is an Onryō.
- Samuel "Sam" Williams: Erma's father, Emiko's husband, Pamela's son and novelist.
- Siris: Erma's undead pet dog who can withstand anything. He is named after Osiris.
- Amy Thorn: Erma's best friend and one of her close friends. She is Alice's older sister, and daughter of Barbara and Henry.
- Felicia Buford: Erma's current babysitter, who took over Nancy's job after Nancy was haunted by Erma's pranks, to look after her when Sam and Emiko left. She also looked after Amy when her parents are away. In the Yokai District story arc, she looks after Siris when Erma and her parents travel to Japan. Has a younger sister named Nya.
- Terry: One of Erma's friends, who does pulling pranks, but only to be backfired.
- Connor Hobson: One of Erma's friends, he has a crush on her and the feeling is mutual.
- Sylvia Miller: One of Erma's friends. She is a WUPer super fan much like Erma and Sidney, regularly depicting them as trio united through a shared interest.
- Sidney: A human-rat hybrid girl who becomes Erma's friend and was formerly a hall monitor at Blairwood Elementary School in The Rats in the School Walls.
- Jordan: One of Erma's friends.
- Miko Cruz: One of Erma's friends.
- Wittle Wallace: A demonic dummy who is the first major villain in the series.
- The Invisible Man: The main antagonist of Spirit Bloom and a recurring character in the main series.
- Nancy: Connor's older sister and Erma's former babysitter who was haunted by the latter and incarcerated in a mental hospital. She was later released and returned home to plan seeking revenge on Erma for scaring her.
- Ms. Joyce Bierly: A homeroom teacher at Blairwood Elementary School who had an immense fear of Erma.
- Principal Phibes: The blind principal of Blairwood Elementary School.
- The Night Detective: An elderly man and enigmatic detective who specializes in paranormal activity. He is the overarching protagonist in the main series, and the major protagonist of the Tales of Outcast webcomics series.
- The Williams family: Sam's family and Erma's paternal relative family.
  - Pamela Williams: Mother of Sam, Michael and Freddy, and wife of her deceased husband Jim.
  - Michael Williams: One of Sam's brothers, Emily's father, Regan's husband and avid hunter.
  - Regan Williams: Emily's mother and Michael's wife.
  - Freddy Williams: One of Sam's brothers.
  - Emily Williams: Erma's younger cousin, and daughter of Michael and Regan.
- The Thorn family: Amy's family.
  - Barbara Thorn: Amy and Alice's mother and Henry's wife.
  - Henry Thorn: Amy and Alice's father and Barbara's husband.
  - Alice Thorn: Amy's younger sister and Barbara and Henry's baby daughter.
  - Sprinkles: The Thorn family's pet cat.
- The Yureimoto clan: Emiko's family and Erma's maternal family.
  - Osamu Yureimoto: The patriarch of the Yureimoto clan, Amayu's husband and the father of Emiko, Fumiko, Yori, Rin, Kentaro, Ena, and Mayumi.
  - Amayu Yureimoto: The matriarch of the Yureimoto clan, Osamu's wife and the mother of Emiko, Fumiko, Yori, Rin, Kentaro, Ena, and Mayumi.
  - Kentaro: The first child and the only son of the Yureimoto clan. He is an oni.
  - Fumiko: The second child and the first and eldest daughter of the Yureimoto clan. She is a harionago.
  - Yori: The third child and the second daughter of the Yureimoto clan, and mother of Mitsu and Momo. She is a rokurokubi.
  - Rin: The fifth child and fourth daughter of the Yureimoto clan. She is a nurei-onna.
  - Ena: The sixth child and the fifth daughter of the Yureimoto clan. She is a nukekubi.
  - Mayumi: The seventh child and the sixth and youngest daughter of the Yureimoto clan. She is a noppera-bo.
  - Mitsu & Momo: The daughters of Yori, granddaughters of Osamu and Amayu, and Erma's mischievous cousins. They are zashiki-warashis.
  - Haru Kappa: A loyal servant to the Yureimoto clan, who is personally assigned to Fumiko. He is a kappa.
  - Kenji Cyclops: A loyal servant to the Yureimoto clan, who is personally assigned to Ena. He is a Hitotsume-kozō.
  - Yuyu: A female yūrei and family servant to the Yureimoto clan, who makes really good tea.
- Toru, Kiko and Mei: A thug trio of yokai and main antagonists of the Yokai District arc. Toru is a strong oni with a kanabō in hand and the only male member of the gang, Kiko is a yuki-onna with cryokinesis and Mei is a taka onna with an elastic body and sharp nails, who is the leader of the gang. In the end, the trio were overpowered and defeated by Erma in her enraged demonic form and turned into small figurines, which were now as decorations on Osamu's desk, keeping them as trophies or for punishment.
- Yokai Kids: A group of bullied yokai children (consisting of a hitotsume-kozō, a nobusuma, a baku, a kappa, a noppera-bō, and a karakasa-kozō) lived in Japan who wanted revenge against the Yureimoto clan after being terrorized by Mitsu and Momo, but ended up completely backfired and enveloped by Erma in her rampage. The yokai kids were left severely affected and mentally scarred after Erma's powers enveloped them. They are the secondary antagonists of the Yokai District arc.
- Akari: A female jorōgumo, who had some connections with the Yureimoto Clan.

== Development ==
Santiago started creating and uploading Erma on DeviantArt and Tumblr in 2014. He was studying at the University of Illinois at Urbana–Champaign at the time, from which he graduated in 2018 to work on the webcomic full-time. The concept of the series originated from a short parody one-shot of Ju-On and The Ring published on May 28, 2014. Following the one-shot's positive reception on DeviantArt and it subsequently going viral across various social media platforms, Santiago decided to develop a series based on the original Erma one-shot, debuting on Tapas on January 3, 2016, and on WEBTOON on April 14, 2018. The series has received universal acclaim for its originality, creativity, and humor. The name of the series was taken from the minor Teenage Mutant Ninja Turtles character Irma Langinstein, and that the surname of Erma title character Erma Williams was taken from the minor The Grudge character Emma Williams.

In October 2017, Santiago developed and released an animated short film based on the comic in conjunction with the company Outcast Studios, run by Donovan Tracy Gaiter and Julia Santiago. Santiago has stated regarding the initial decision to exclusively release the strip on Tapas that "Erma should at least be on one main website where it would be easy for anyone, fan or newcomer, to come together, and be able to read all of the comics in chronological order, with a more organized list"; despite this, the comic was later released on WEBTOON.

== Bibliography ==
=== Collections ===
Several print collections and a graphic novel have been published. Erma #1 covered various strips from 2014 to 2015 alongside original strips, while Erma #2 featured solely original strips. Spirit's Bloom, a graphic novel set before the events of Erma, detailing how Erma's parents met as well as expanding the series' mythology, was released in 2017. A third collection, Tales of Outcast, featuring the writing of Donovan Tracy and art of Erik Lervold and Kirsten Celander, was released in 2019.

Title	Publication date	ISBN / ASIN	Synopsis	Publisher
Erma #1	October 23, 2017	B076QCQPFT	This is the story of a little girl named Erma, who is enjoying life in the suburbs going to school, hanging out with friends, and even spending time with the family. What is the catch? She is a ghost. Enjoy her antics in 22 strips from the original web series and 12 never-before-seen pages EXCLUSIVE to the book!	Outcast Comics, BJS Incorporated
Erma #2	October 23, 2017	B076QDT2K3	Prepare for the next chapter in the bizarre and eerie misadventures of Erma. This time, with all new never-before-seen strips on every page EXCLUSIVELY for the book!	Outcast Comics, BJS Incorporated
Tales of Outcast #1	March 13, 2019	B07PQVWDFP	A new threat has come to the town of Blairwood.	Outcast Studios
Tales of Outcast #2	April 29, 2019	B07R7XVLB6	Discovering that their souls are trapped in a video game, Erma brings herself into the world of the Labyrinth to rescue her friends.	Outcast Studios
Tales of Outcast #3	May 17, 2019	B07RZBJMV2	Erma and her friends try to find their way out of the Labyrinth with the mysterious creature hot on their trail.	Outcast Studios
Tales of Outcast #4	July 8, 2019	B07V488HPS	With nowhere left to run, Erma, Terry, and Connor face off against the creature that has taken their friends and family in an attempt to escape the Labyrinth once and for all.	Outcast Studios
Tales of Outcast #5	July 17, 2019	B07VFQJC1D	As Erma and her parents are on their trip in Japan, Felicia loses their dog, Siris, while on a walk in the park.	Outcast Studios
Tales of Outcast #6	March 13, 2020	B085X3W9NS	The Warrior Unicorn Princess is the heir to a fallen kingdom, and takes to the battlefield in the name of love and friendship.	Outcast Studios
Tales of Outcast #7	March 13, 2020	B085X4DFP3	Warrior Unicorn Princess returns to her home, a kingdom corrupted by dark forces.	Outcast Studios
Tales of Outcast #8	March 13, 2020	B085X3NVDD	The Night Detective investigates the disappearance of two teenagers.	Outcast Studios
Tales of Outcast #9	October 1, 2020	B08KHXK6WN	The Night Detective is called in when a little girl's mother is trapped within their home. No one can get in except for him, but as he makes his way through the halls of the house, he uncovers something much more sinister.	Outcast Studios
Tales of Outcast #10	October 1, 2020	B08KJCZY6M	During a daily walk, Siris learns of a missing dog and goes on a trek through the neighborhood to find the poor little canine.	Outcast Studios
Tales of Outcast #11	November 17, 2020	B08NTWX7LB	Now that she has taken back her kingdom, Warrior Unicorn Princess heads to search for resources to rebuild it. This leads her to chase down a group of raiders deep within the darkened lands.	Outcast Studios
Tales of Outcast #12	May 3, 2021	B09468JRHY	As Warrior Unicorn Princess begins to rebuild her old home, she journeys through the castle halls to rekindle memories lost within the rubble.	Outcast Studios
Tales of Outcast #13	May 3, 2021	B09467LP3T	A history museum gets quite the surprise when a young woman steals a mysterious mask and gains its powers.	Outcast Studios
Tales of Outcast #14	May 3, 2021	B0945S9RBM	Jade returns with the first of many yokai masks and gives her team the run down on the origins of their power.	Outcast Studios
Tales of Outcast #15	May 5, 2021	B094BZV8CJ	We follow a pair of mysterious twins as they are pushed to their limits being the targeted new girls at school. After a week of constant bullying, they will take matters into their own mischievous hands.	Outcast Studios
Tales of Outcast #16	June 7, 2023	B0C7HHFQDY	In an Earth covered by endless water, the lands of the old world had shattered and now float amongst the clouds thanks to an event called The Great Rise. The remnants of these lands hold countless treasures for adventurers to find. Adventurers such as Chloe, a young girl with cybernetic enhancements who ventures into a mysterious dome city to discover what lies inside. Will she find treasure or dangers from the past?	Outcast Studios
Tales of Outcast #17	June 7, 2023	B0C7HJ4RNK	Surrounded and being gunned at by the Balmoral pirates and ancient Praetorbots, Chloe must escape the ancient dome city. However, even with her enhanced reach and speed, Lady Balmoral is on her tail.	Outcast Studios
Tales of Outcast #18	June 12, 2023	B0C7WGR8P7	Come by the fire while the night is young and all of its creatures come out to play. Enjoy its warmth while you can as we tell you 3 tales of the past. One of a sinful puppet, memories of a bygone time, and the endless duty of monsters' most feared detective.	Outcast Studios
Tales of Outcast #19	June 18, 2023	B0C8LPK55D	A look at the original concept sketches and layout art from the second volume of the Tales of Outcast book series.	Outcast Studios

=== Graphic novel ===
Title	Publication date	ISBN / ASIN	Synopsis	Publisher
Spirit's Bloom	October 6, 2017	B0768FJ131	A prequel to the web comic series, introducing Erma's parents in their younger years and showing how they came to know one another.	Outcast Comics, BJS Incorporated
Erma: The Family Reunion	July 7, 2024	B0DG3H3H62	A paperback edition of the first two chapters of The Family Reunion Arc of the main Erma comic, consisting of 'The Reunion' and 'The Search'. While also including several Behind the Scenes sketches and storyboard layouts. Erma and her parents head to a yokai village in the woods of Japan for a reunion with her ghost mother's side of the family to prepare for a tradition called The Night Parade. But Erma soon finds herself caught in shadows of the past as her mother tries to heal broken wounds with the family and looming threats approach from in and out of the village walls.	Outcast Studios

=== Novel ===
Title	Publication date	ISBN / ASIN	Synopsis	Publisher
Yokai	March 13, 2020	TBA	What started as a simple family vacation turns into a journey of discovery and mystery. Join the award-winning horror author, Sam Williams, as he journals his encounters through a bizarre village lost in the foggy forests of Japan. A place thought to be abandoned by time, but is in fact the home to some of the strangest creatures one will ever set eyes on.	Outcast Studios

=== Picture book ===
Title	Publication date	ISBN / ASIN	Synopsis	Publisher
Meet Erma	March 13, 2020	B085X3R21W	We explore a day in the life of the little ghost girl, Erma, in this spooky little introduction to horror for kids.	Outcast Studios

== Other media ==
=== Pilot (2017) ===
No.	Title	Directed by	Written by	Storyboarded by	Music and sound effects by	Original release date	Prod. code
1	"Erma"	Brandon Santiago	Tracy Gaiter & Julia Santiago	Kirsten Celander	Derek Kolecki	October 30, 2017	TBA
On a windy night of "Meet Your Teacher Before School Starts" at Blairwood Elementary School, teacher Ms. Bierly notes that she has yet to meet one student, Erma Williams. A girl arrives, accompanied by supernatural phenomena, which Ms. Bierly attempts to flee from, only to find the exits locked. The girl offers her a red apple. As Bierly ponders the meaning of this, Sam Williams opens the classroom door looking for his daughter Erma, and identifies her as the girl in front of Bierly. Beckoning her to him to go home, Erma turns her head, revealing her normal pale face and inverted-coloured eyes. Cast: Cecelia Negron as "The Teacher" (Ms. Bierly), with Derek Kolecki as "Erma's Dad" (Samuel "Sam" Williams)

An animation based on Erma was in development since 2015 after the release of Erma #2 via Brandon's Tumblr page. Santiago revealed that he had a "secret" project in development in addition to Erma #3 in October 2017, which he cited as the reason "there [wouldn't] be as many Halloween strips this month as last year". Erma – Animated Short Film was uploaded to YouTube that month by Santiago, with a notification on Tapas describing the film as "a surprise for all of you", referring to fans of the Erma series. The film was produced by Outcast Studios, and has received a positive reception. The film is set prior to the first Erma strip, detailing how Erma's teacher Ms. Bierly met Erma. The short partially adapts "Coming Soon", a stand-alone comic released to Santiago's DeviantArt and Tumblr pages to announce the development of an ongoing Erma series prior to the series' original launch.

=== Web series (2024–present) ===
==== Season 1 (2024-25) ====
No.	Title	Directed by	Written by	Storyboarded by	Music and sound effects by	Original release date	Prod. code
1	"The Awakening"	Brandon Santiago	Tracy Gaiter & Julia Santiago	Kirsten Celander	Derek Kolecki	July 26, 2024	TBA
2	"The First Kiss"	Brandon Santiago	Tracy Gaiter & Julia Santiago	Kirsten Celander	Derek Kolecki	August 9, 2024	TBA
3	"The Dog"	Brandon Santiago	Tracy Gaiter & Julia Santiago	Kirsten Celander	Derek Kolecki	September 13, 2024	TBA
4	"Smile"	Brandon Santiago	Tracy Gaiter & Julia Santiago	Kirsten Celander	Derek Kolecki	October 13, 2024	TBA
5	"Trick or Treat"	Brandon Santiago	Tracy Gaiter & Julia Santiago	Kirsten Celander	Derek Kolecki	October 31, 2024	TBA
A	"Blairwood Holidays"	Brandon Santiago	Tracy Gaiter & Julia Santiago	Kirsten Celander	Derek Kolecki	December 25, 2024	TBA
7	"Colorful Imagination"	Brandon Santiago	Tracy Gaiter & Julia Santiago	Kirsten Celander	Derek Kolecki	March 14, 2025	TBA

==== Season 2 (2025-present) ====
No.	Title	Directed by	Written by	Storyboarded by	Music and sound effects by	Original release date	Prod. code
1	"Kakureru"	Brandon Santiago	Tracy Gaiter & Julia Santiago	Kirsten Celander	Derek Kolecki	October 31, 2025	TBA

=== Video game (2026) ===
In August 2016, Santiago designed and released a video game based on Erma as a series of levels through Super Mario Maker, a game creation system developed and published by Nintendo for the Wii U and Nintendo 3DS. The game, titled Erma's Well of Horror, contains several images of Erma composed of darkness and clouds, and has a completion rate of 4.94%. Promotional art for the game features Mario encountering Erma as he's about to enter a Warp Pipe, shocked by her appearance. Santiago has stated that the game was specifically designed for readers of the Erma webcomic, as compensation for a temporary delay in the release of the following strip that existed at the time. An updated version of Erma's Well of Horror was later released to Super Mario Maker 2 upon its release in 2019. A point-and-click adventure game, Erma: The Game, intended for release on iOS and Mac devices, had begun development by March 2019, and was officially released on Steam on January 30, 2026. The game follows Erma as she searches her neighborhood of Blairwood after her science project goes awry.

== Reception ==
Brad Miska of Bloody Disgusting has described the quality of the series as being on par with, if not superior to, Calvin and Hobbes. Miska also cited Santiago as having been "working diligently" with Erma; Miska additionally mistook the character of Emiko Williams (née Yūreimoto) for Samara Morgan in his review, the character from whom the design for Erma was gotten (alongside Kayako Saeki). In a follow-up review to that of Miska's for Bloody Disgusting, Jonathan Barkan described Erma as "adorable" and "innocent", expressing fondness the series' "squeal-inducing" moments and citing "Movie Night" as his favourite strip.

Giallo Julian of Dread Central praised Erma as "just wholesome, feel-good content dipped in a nice coating of horror imagery… and you can bet your bloody guts that [one would] love every single bit of it. It's a celebration of the horror culture in the style of an old Peanuts comic strip", in particular praising its evolution from "one-shot stories establishing Erma [to] longer narratives, and [how] it begins to flesh out a creative world that [is] just a joy to see".

Harry Situation of The Prose described Erma as an "[a]bsolutely fun read", calling the series "by far one of the best comic strips I've ever read", citing his love for Santiago's method of characterization of the main characters, finding "the rest of the characters [to be] just as likable too", describing the characters of Sam and Emiko Williams as "the most lovable couple ever". Regarding the series' artwork, Situation described it as "incredible", saying "[t]here's so much attention to detail that it's mind-blowing. I love the expressions people give in the comic whenever Erma does something freaky. Their drawn faces and reactions are just priceless. Even Erma's expressions are entertaining. While she doesn't talk throughout the series, Brandon found a way to let her mood and thoughts let the readers know what she's saying, and this method is brilliant. Also, it's nice to spot some cameos and easter eggs of classic horror movies in each comic strip".

Chase Magnett of BuzzFeed described the series overall as "[to] be read by people of all ages", describing its humour and artwork as "adorable". Regarding the series' content, Magnett referred to Erma as "contain[ing] practical information for everyday life", "teach[ing] kids that actions have consequences", and "laugh[ing] at the day-to-day concerns of parenthood", overall stating the series to have "something that everyone can relate to". Deanna Destito of Comics Beat praised Santiago's depiction of the titular Erma Williams as a "ghoulish creeper [who] just wants to be like any other kid", complementing the series' contrast with such horror franchises as The Grudge, and describing the series overall as "quirky, cute, and even a little heartwarming".

== See also ==
- Portrayal of women in comics
- Ju-On franchise
- The Ring franchise
