= Takeshi Furukawa =

Japanese-American composer and conductor

- Genres: Soundtrack; Contemporary classical
- Occupations: Composer; conductor
- Instruments: Piano; viola
- Label: Iam8bit
- Website: www.takeshifurukawa.com

Takeshi Furukawa (古川 毅, Furukawa Takeshi) is a Japanese-American composer and conductor. His works have spanned the concert stage, films, television, video games, and advertising campaigns.

== Early life ==
Furukawa was born in Tokyo, Japan, and raised in the suburbs of Los Angeles after moving to the United States at the age of three. As a child, he studied the piano, then, later on, the viola. Furukawa was inspired to pursue composition after seeing Jurassic Park and hearing John Williams' score, and his parents, although non-musical themselves, accorded him to a very privileged music education.

== Career ==
In 2016, Furukawa composed the score for Fumito Ueda's The Last Guardian. The performance of the soundtrack was conducted by Furukawa with the London Symphony Orchestra, the Trinity Boys Choir, and London Voices, and was recorded at Lyndhurst Hall. On February 16, 2023 it was confirmed that Takeshi Furukawa was attached to the live action Avatar: The Last Airbender project as its composer.

== Works ==
Video games
| Year | Title | Role | Awards & nominations |
|---|---|---|---|
| 2012 | 007 Legends | Composer (additional music) | |
| 2016 | The Last Guardian | Composer, orchestrator, conductor | Winner - IGN Award for Best Original Music; Winner - Premio Drago d'Oro for Miglior Colonna Sonora; Nominated - BAFTA Games Award for Music; Nominated - D.I.C.E. Award for Outstanding Achievement in Original Music Composition; Nominated - IFMCA Award for Best Original Score for a Video Game or Interactive Media; Nominated - SXSW Gaming Awards for Excellence in Musical Score |
| 2023 | Planet of Lana | Composer | Nominated - D.I.C.E. Award for Outstanding Achievement in Original Music Composition; Nominated - International Film Music Critics Association Award for Best Original Score for a Video Game or Interactive Media |
| 2026 | Planet of Lana II | Composer | |
Films
| Year | Title | Role | Awards & Nominations |
| 2008 | Star Wars: The Clone Wars | Orchestrator | |
| 2010 | NoNAMES | Composer | |
| 2011 | Bhopali | Composer | |
Television
| Year | Title | Role | Awards & Nominations |
| 2004–2005 | Star Trek: Enterprise | Orchestrator | |
| 2008–2013 | Star Wars: The Clone Wars | Composer | |
| 2019–2025 | Mythic Quest | Composer | |
| 2024–present | Avatar: The Last Airbender | Composer | |
| 2025 | Side Quest | Composer | |
