= Avatar: The Last Airbender (2024 TV series) =

American fantasy television series

- Genre: Action-adventure; Comedy drama; Fantasy
- Based on: Avatar: The Last Airbender by: Bryan Konietzko; Michael Dante DiMartino
- Developed by: Albert Kim
- Showrunners: Albert Kim; Christine Boylan
- Starring: Gordon Cormier; Kiawentiio; Ian Ousley; Dallas Liu; Paul Sun-Hyung Lee; Ken Leung; Daniel Dae Kim; Elizabeth Yu; Momona Tamada; Miyako
- Music by: Takeshi Furukawa
- Country of origin: United States
- Original language: English
- No. of seasons: 2
- No. of episodes: 15

Production
- Executive producers: Albert Kim; Jabbar Raisani; Dan Lin; Lindsey Liberatore; Michael Goi; Christine Boylan; Ryan Halprin; Brendan Ferguson
- Producers: Bonnie Benwick; Joshua Hale Fialkov; Craig Forrest; Ubah Mohamed
- Production location: Vancouver, British Columbia
- Cinematography: Michael Goi; Michael Balfry; Stewart Whelan; Simon Chapman
- Editors: Ian S. Tan; Wendy Tzeng; David Lebowitz; Joe Talbot Hall; Chris Visser; Payton Koch; Sarah Zeitlin; Chester Howie
- Running time: 47–69 minutes
- Production companies: Albert Kim Pictures; Rideback; Nickelodeon Productions; Pocketwatch Productions; Binary Solo
- Budget: $120 million (season 1)

Original release
- Network: Netflix
- Release: February 22, 2024 – present

Avatar: The Last Airbender is an American fantasy action-adventure television series developed by Albert Kim for Netflix. It is a live-action adaptation of the animated television series created by Michael Dante DiMartino and Bryan Konietzko for Nickelodeon. The cast includes Gordon Cormier, Kiawentiio, Ian Ousley, Dallas Liu, Paul Sun-Hyung Lee, Ken Leung, Daniel Dae Kim, Elizabeth Yu, Momona Tamada, and Miyako. The series is set in a world divided into four nations based on the classical elements: the Water Tribes, the Earth Kingdom, the Fire Nation, and the Air Nomads. In each nation, people known as "benders" can manipulate one of the four elements. The story follows the journey of twelve-year-old Aang, the last survivor of the Air Nomads and the next "Avatar", the only bender who can master all four elements.

First announced in September 2018, DiMartino and Konietzko were originally attached as both executive producers and showrunners; however, the pair later departed the series due to creative differences, and Kim replaced them as showrunner. The first season was filmed from November 2021 to June 2022, while the second and third seasons were filmed back-to-back from September 2024 to November 2025.

The first season of Avatar: The Last Airbender premiered on February 22, 2024. In March 2024, the series was renewed for a second and a third season. The second season premiered on June 25, 2026. The third and final season is set to premiere in 2027. The series received mixed reviews from critics, who praised the visual effects, action sequences, musical score, and cultural representation, but criticized the writing, pacing, and some performances. However, it was considered a significant improvement over the universally panned 2010 film adaptation.

== Premise ==
The series is set in a war-torn world where certain people can "bend" one of the four classical elements—water, earth, fire, or air. Aang, the "Avatar" and the last living Airbender, is the bridge between the mortal and spirit worlds, and the only one capable of bending all four of the elements instead of just one. The Avatar maintains the balance of the world and nature to bring peace, and after awakening frozen, a century after the genocide of his people, Aang is now faced with the responsibility of ending the ambitions of the militaristic Fire Nation to conquer the world. With his new companions Katara and Sokka, Aang sets out to master the four elements while pursued by Zuko, the exiled crown prince of the Fire Nation, who seeks to regain his honor by capturing him.

== Cast and characters ==
=== Main ===
- Gordon Cormier as Aang: A free-spirited and peaceful twelve-year-old airbender who was frozen in ice for one hundred years. When he wakes up, all the other airbenders have been wiped out by the Fire Nation and he embarks on a quest to end the war and become the figurehead of balance and harmony for the world as the Avatar.
  - Gian Carlo portrays young Aang in flashbacks.
- Kiawentiio as Katara: A fourteen-year-old who is the last waterbender of the Southern Water Tribe after her mother was killed by the Fire Nation. Despite her personal tragedy, she joins Aang on his journey while growing to her true potential.
  - Meadow Kingfisher portrays young Katara in flashbacks.
- Ian Ousley as Sokka: Katara's sixteen-year-old brother who has tried to become the quasi-leader of their tribe after their father left to fight in the war. He joins Aang on his mission along with Katara, and makes up for his lack of bending abilities with his intelligence, resourcefulness, and trusty boomerang.
- Dallas Liu as Prince Zuko: The seventeen-year-old scarred, exiled, and short-tempered crown prince of the Fire Nation, bent on capturing the Avatar to end his banishment and regain his honor.
  - Jordan Roberto Chien portrays young Zuko in flashbacks.
- Paul Sun-Hyung Lee as Uncle Iroh: A retired Fire Nation general and the wise and nurturing uncle and mentor to Zuko.
- Ken Leung as Commander/Admiral Zhao (season 1): An ambitious, yet arrogant, ruthless, and dishonorable Fire Nation naval officer and Zuko's bitter main rival in his pursuit of the Avatar. Leung said he initially assumed he was auditioning for a character from James Cameron's Avatar franchise due to how Netflix set up secret auditions with fake scenes during the casting process.
- Daniel Dae Kim (Note: Dae Kim is only credited for the episodes in which he appears.) as Fire Lord Ozai: The tyrannical and sadistic ruler of the Fire Nation, Iroh's younger brother, and Zuko and Azula's father. Kim had previously lent his voice to the Avatar: The Last Airbender franchise: as General Fong in Book Two of The Last Airbender and as Hiroshi Sato in The Legend of Korra. "He's deliciously a villain, and that's what I sank my teeth into," Kim said in an interview, going on to compare Ozai with Darth Vader from Star Wars.
- Elizabeth Yu as Princess Azula (season 2; recurring season 1): The cunning and prodigiously gifted princess of the Fire Nation and Zuko's younger sister. Showrunner Albert Kim stated ahead of the series premiere that Azula is featured a lot more in the show's first season than she is in the first season of the animated series, crediting the knowledge of what Azula does later in the original show's second and third seasons for the writers having the advantage of where to take her.
  - Cordelia Chao portrays young Azula in flashbacks.
- Momona Tamada as Ty Lee (season 2; recurring season 1): Azula's acrobatic and cheerful friend who is skilled in chi-blocking.
- Miyako as Toph Beifong (season 2): An abrasive and unfiltered earthbending prodigy who was born blind and uses her abilities to sense around her by feeling seismic vibrations.

=== Recurring ===
- Lim Kay Siu as Gyatso (season 1): A mischievous, chipper, kind, and caring Air Nomad monk who is Aang's mentor and father figure.
- Casey Camp-Horinek as Gran Gran (season 1): The matriarch of the Southern Water Tribe and Sokka and Katara's paternal grandmother.
- Matthew Yang King (seasons 1–2) and Dee Bradley Baker (season 2) as the vocalizations of:
  - Appa, a sky bison who is Aang's companion.
  - Momo, a winged lemur who befriends Aang and joins him on his journey.
- Ruy Iskandar as Lieutenant Jee (season 1): A Fire Nation officer on Zuko's ship.
- Ryan Mah as Lieutenant Dang (season 1): A Fire Nation naval officer loyal to Zhao.
- Maria Zhang as Suki: The leader of Kyoshi Island's elite all-female soldiers, the Kyoshi Warriors.
- Utkarsh Ambudkar as King Bumi: The elderly king of Omashu who is Aang's oldest friend. Pradnesh Prakask portrays a young Bumi in flashbacks.
- Danny Pudi as Sai, the Mechanist: A single father and inventor from the Earth Kingdom.
- Thalia Tran as Mai: Azula's stoic friend who is skilled in knife throwing.
- Sebastian Amoruso as Jet: The leader of the Freedom Fighters, a group of revolutionaries who fight back against the Fire Nation.
- Amber Midthunder as Princess Yue (season 1): The princess of the Northern Water Tribe. Midthunder also voices the fox form of Princess Yue in the Spirit World.
- Rekha Sharma as Amita (season 2): A herbalist from Omashu who bonds with Sai.
- Jeremiah Oh as General Vinh Tran (season 2): A Fire Nation general who leads the campaign to invade Ba Sing Se.
- Crystal Yu as Poppy Beifong (season 2): Toph's overprotective mother.
- Hoa Xuande as Professor Zei (season 2): A scholar and professor at Ba Sing Se University.
- Justin Chien as Earth King Kuei (season 2): The ruler of Ba Sing Se.
- Chin Han as Long Feng (season 2): The cultural minister of Ba Sing Se and leader of the Dai Li.
- Amanda Zhou as Joo Dee (season 2): A guide for new arrivals in Ba Sing Se.
- Lourdes Faberes as General Sung (season 2): The commander of forces protecting the outer walls of Ba Sing Se.
- Gabriel Takahashi as Lieutenant Khettry (season 2): An Earth Kingdom officer in Ba Sing Se.
- Kelsey Lopes as Jin (season 2): A waitress at a tea shop in Ba Sing Se who is interested in Zuko.

=== Guest ===
Introduced in season 1

- Hiro Kanagawa as Fire Lord Sozin: The Fire Lord who started the 100-year war and Zuko's great-grandfather.
- Clyde Kusatsu as Kaja: A Fire Sage who serves Sozin. Kusatsu previously voiced the character Pasang in the animated series.
- David Sakurai as an Earth Kingdom spy who discovers Sozin's plan to attack the other nations.
- Yvonne Chapman as Avatar Kyoshi (seasons 1–2): The legendary earthbender Avatar preceding Aang's previous incarnation, Roku.
- Tamlyn Tomita as Yukari: Suki's mother and the fiercely protective mayor of her small village on Kyoshi Island.
- Lucian-River Chauhan as Teo (seasons 1–2): Sai's wheelchair-using son.
- James Sie as the Cabbage Merchant (seasons 1–2): An unfortunate merchant whose produce is continually destroyed. Sie reprises his role from the animated series.
- Osric Chau as Tan: The leader of a group of Fire Nation rebels who plan to assassinate Ozai.
- Taylor Lam Wright as the Duke: The youngest member of the Freedom Fighters.
- Vincent Huang as Pipsqueak: A physically imposing member of the Freedom Fighters.
- Wes Valarao as Smellerbee (seasons 1–2): A female member of the Freedom Fighters who is often mistaken for a boy because of her looks.
- Nathaniel Kong as Longshot (seasons 1–2): A silent archer and member of the Freedom Fighters.
- Albert Nicholas as Captain Dixit (seasons 1–2): An Earth Kingdom captain in Omashu who seeks revenge for Iroh's role during the siege of Ba Sing Se.
- Justin Wong as Chong (seasons 1–2): The leader of a group of nomadic minstrels in Omashu.
- George Takei as the voice of Koh the Face Stealer: A centipede-like spirit who collects the faces of his victims. Takei previously voiced the warden of a Fire Nation prison camp in the animated series.
- Randall Duk Kim as the voice of Wan Shi Tong (seasons 1–2): An owl-like spirit and collector of knowledge who is very distrustful towards humans.
- Arden Cho as June: A bounty hunter who is hired by Zuko to find the Avatar.
- Rainbow Dickerson as Kya: Sokka and Katara's mother.
- Joel Montgrand (season 1) and Adam Beach (season 3) as Chief Hakoda: Sokka and Katara's father and the chieftain of the Southern Water Tribe who left to fight in the war.
- Trevor Carroll as Bato: Hakoda's friend and a Southern Water Tribe warrior.
- Ash Lee as Shufen: The head of an Earth Kingdom village that is being terrorized by an angry forest spirit.
- Ciara Mandel as Lian: Shufen's daughter.
- Simon Chin as Yang: A bartender at an Earth Kingdom village.
- C. S. Lee (season 1) and Lawrence Kao (season 2) as Avatar Roku: The firebender Avatar preceding Aang, who mentors him in communing with the spirit world.
- François Chau as the Great Sage: The leader of the Fire Sages at a fire temple dedicated to Avatar Roku.
- James Rha as Shyu: A Fire Sage who guides Aang through the fire temple.
- A Martinez as Pakku: A waterbending master from the Northern Water Tribe.
- Nathaniel Arcand as Chief Arnook: The chieftain of the Northern Water Tribe and Yue's father.
- Irene Bedard as Yagoda: A waterbender healer from the Northern Water Tribe.
- Joel Oulette as Hahn: A Northern Water Tribe warrior formerly betrothed to Princess Yue.
- Meegwun Fairbrother as Avatar Kuruk (seasons 1–2): The waterbender Avatar preceding Kyoshi.

Introduced in season 2

- Dolly de Leon as Lo and Li: Azula's twin advisors.
- Madison Hu as Fei: A farmer whose parents were killed by Fire Nation soldiers.
- Rickie Wang as Peng: Fei's younger brother who encounters Zuko.
- Kelemete Misipeka as The Boulder: An overconfident earthbending wrestler.
- Lily Gao as Ursa: Zuko and Azula's mother.
- Shintaro Kanaoya as Lao Beifong: Toph's father and a wealthy businessman.
- Andy Yu as Ji Shen: The Beifong family secretary. He is loosely based on the character Master Yu from the animated series.
- Mapuana Makia as Lady Ouyang: A socialite in Ba Sing Se who is acquainted with the Beifong family.
- Michael Cha as Lord Ouyang: A socialite in Ba Sing Se and Lady Ouyang's husband.
- Terry Chen as Jeong Jeong: A former Fire Nation officer who deserted the army and took refuge in Ba Sing Se.
- Vincent Tong as Lau Wong: A shady opportunist who blackmails Toph with allegations regarding her parents. Tong has previously voiced Zuko in several video games published by GameMill Entertainment.
- Benny Wang as Tycho: A struggling refugee who attempts to rob Iroh.
- Dichen Lachman as Avatar Yangchen: The airbender Avatar preceding Kuruk.

Introduced in season 3

- Jon Jon Briones as Piandao
- Tantoo Cardinal as Hama

Cast notes

== Episodes ==
Season	Episodes	Originally released
1	8	February 22, 2024
2	7	June 25, 2026

=== Season 1 (2024) ===
No. overall	No. in season	Title	Directed by	Written by	Original release date
1	1	"Aang"	Michael Goi	Teleplay by : Albert Kim and Michael Dante DiMartino & Bryan Konietzko	February 22, 2024
The airbender Aang learns from his mentor, Monk Gyatso, that he is the next Avatar and must bring balance to the world. Wary of this responsibility, Aang flies on his sky bison Appa to "clear his mind". The Fire Nation, led by Fire Lord Sozin, commences a genocide of the Air Nomads. Aang and Appa escape the massacre but are caught in a storm and become frozen in an iceberg. One hundred years later, the siblings Sokka and Katara of the Southern Water Tribe discover the duo and free them for the iceberg, attracting the attention of Prince Zuko of the Fire Nation, who has been sent by his estranged father Fire Lord Ozai on a quest to capture the long-lost Avatar. The Fire Nation confronts the Southern Water Tribe village, and Aang surrenders himself to save the lives of the villagers. Aboard Zuko's ship, Aang meets Zuko's uncle Iroh and later escapes with the help of Katara and Sokka. Together with Appa, they travel to the abandoned Southern Air Temple, where Aang discovers the remains of his people, including Gyatso. After briefly entering the Avatar State, Aang resolves to bring balance to the world.
2	2	"Warriors"	Michael Goi	Joshua Hale Fialkov	February 22, 2024
Using a diary stolen from Zuko, Aang decides to visit Kyoshi Island, the home of Avatar Kyoshi, one of Aang's previous incarnations. Meanwhile, Zuko and Iroh meet with Commander Zhao, a high-ranking officer in the Fire Nation navy, who learns about the return of the Avatar from one of their crew. The two factions then compete to find the Avatar first, both hoping to gain the favor of the Fire Lord. Aang and his friends arrive on Kyoshi Island, where they are confronted by the Kyoshi Warriors and their leader Suki. After learning that Aang is the Avatar, the villagers of the island welcome the visitors. Sokka becomes close with Suki as she trains him to fight like a Kyoshi Warrior. With the encouragement of Katara, Aang enters into the Avatar State and communes with Kyoshi, who briefs him about his duties and responsibilities as the Avatar and warns him of a future Fire Nation invasion of the Northern Water Tribe. As Fire Nation forces led by Zhao and Zuko converge on Kyoshi Island, Kyoshi possesses Aang and drives away the invaders.
3	3	"Omashu"	Jabbar Raisani	Christine Boylan	February 22, 2024
In the Fire Nation, Zuko's ambitious younger sister Azula foils a coup attempt against her father Ozai, currying his favor. Ozai receives a message from Zhao confirming that the Avatar is alive, and Azula sends Zhao a reply promising to help him and prevent her brother from regaining his honor. Aang and his friends travel to the Earth Kingdom city of Omashu, where they befriend Teo and his mechanist father Sai, who creates mechanical gliders for the king of Omashu. Katara spends time with Jet, the leader of the Freedom Fighters, who are attempting to rid the city of Fire Nation spies. Zuko and Iroh infiltrate Omashu, intent on capturing Aang. After learning of the Freedom Fighters' plan to assassinate the king of Omashu, Aang and his friends stop them, but are attacked by Zuko. Aang duels Zuko, who attracts the attention of Earth Kingdom soldiers after Zuko uses firebending. Iroh creates a distraction that allows Zuko to escape, but the soldiers capture both him and Aang.
4	4	"Into the Dark"	Jabbar Raisani	Keely MacDonald	February 22, 2024
Aang is brought before the elderly king in his palace, and learns that he is Bumi, Aang's childhood friend. Angry that Aang had disappeared for a century, Bumi subjects him to a series of tests. Through Jet, Katara learns that Sai had been supplying Fire Nation spies with information to protect his son. Sokka tries to convince Sai to help expose the spies for the good of Omashu. Sokka and Katara then use a series of secret tunnels to reach Aang and encounter a troupe of singing minstrels and several badgermoles along the way. Bumi forces Aang to duel him, but Aang refuses to fight back and reminds Bumi of their past friendship. Bumi forgives Aang and is inspired to join the fight against the Fire Nation after Sai exposes the Fire Nation spies, before Aang and his friends leave the city. Meanwhile, Iroh is escorted away from Omashu by Earth Kingdom soldiers, but is reminded of his time as a Fire Nation general and the death of his son. Zuko soon rescues him, and the two head back to their ship.
5	5	"Spirited Away"	Roseanne Liang	Gabriel Llanas	February 22, 2024
Zuko and Iroh enlist the services of the bounty hunter June to help them hunt down the Avatar. Azula convinces Ozai to grant Zhao more resources, and he is promoted to admiral. Continuing their journey, Aang and his friends visit a village where several villagers have disappeared into the Spirit World. They are soon pulled into the Spirit World and encounter Hei Bai, the vengeful spirit of a nearby forest that the Fire Nation had burned down. The group becomes separated, and Katara experiences a vision of when her mother was killed while keeping her hidden from the Fire Nation. Sokka briefly meets a friendly fox spirit before experiencing a vision of his father chastising him for being a disappointment. Aang encounters the spirit Koh the Face Stealer, who reveals that he was responsible for kidnapping the missing villagers and has taken Sokka and Katara captive as well. Aang escapes Koh and encounters the spirit of Gyatso, who advises him to seek out Avatar Roku, who had previously encountered Koh, so Aang can learn how to save his friends.
6	6	"Masks"	Roseanne Liang	Teleplay by : Emily Kim & Hunter Ries and Bryan Konietzko; Story by : Ubah Mohamed and Bryan Konietzko & Michael Dante DiMartino	February 22, 2024
In a series of flashbacks, Zuko insults a general's plan during a war meeting that involved sacrificing the 41st Division of Fire Nation soldiers. After Zuko refuses to participate in an Agni Kai duel against his father, Ozai exiles him as punishment. He gives Zuko command of a ship consisting of the previously doomed 41st division and tasks him with finding the Avatar to lift his banishment and regain his honor. In the present, Aang travels to Crescent Island to commune with Avatar Roku so he can save his friends from Koh. However, he is discovered by the Fire Sages, but a defecting sage helps him enter the temple. Aang communes with Roku, who tells him to trade Koh a statue that Roku had previously stolen from him. Before Aang can leave, he is captured by June and brought to Zuko's ship. Zhao arrives and takes Aang prisoner to deny Zuko. Aang is later rescued by a swordsman known as the "Blue Spirit" and quickly discovers that he is Zuko in disguise. Aang then saves Zuko from Zhao's soldiers before escaping. Aang soon returns to the Spirit World and trades Koh the statue, freeing his friends and the captive villagers.
7	7	"The North"	Jet Wilkinson	Audrey Wong Kennedy	February 22, 2024
Zhao attempts to kill Zuko by blowing up his boat, and forces Iroh to help lead the invasion of the Northern Water Tribe. Zuko survives by disguising himself as a guard. Ozai relentlessly tests Azula to prove her firebending abilities, and she impresses him after showing that she can generate lightning. Aang and his friends reach the Northern Water Tribe, where they are hosted by Chief Arnook and his daughter, Princess Yue. Aang warns Arnook about the impending Fire Nation invasion, but he remains unimpressed that Aang has only mastered one of the four elements. Sokka bonds with Yue, who reveals she was the fox spirit he had previously encountered because of her connection to the Moon Spirit. Aang visits the shrine of Avatar Kuruk to commune with him, but he remains reluctant to teach Aang and cautions him against becoming attached to his friends. Seeking to improve her waterbending, Katara asks Master Pakku to teach her to fight, but he refuses, as women in his tribe do not fight by tradition. Katara challenges Pakku to a duel, but despite Pakku winning, she inspires him to allow her to fight.
8	8	"Legends"	Jet Wilkinson	Albert Kim	February 22, 2024
Zhao's Fire Nation fleet besieges the Northern Water Tribe. Katara helps Pakku and Arnook defend the city, while Sokka protects Yue. Zhao briefs Iroh about his plan to kill the Moon Spirit to strip the waterbenders of their abilities. Zhao, Iroh, and a disguised Zuko then infiltrate the city amidst the invasion and reach the Spirit Oasis, where the Moon and Ocean Spirits reside. Despite Iroh's objections, Zhao kills the Moon Spirit, giving the Fire Nation the upper hand. Aang enters the Avatar State and merges with the Ocean Spirit before rampaging through the city, attacking the Fire Nation's forces. Zhao attempts to kill Zuko in a duel but is killed by Iroh, and they flee the battle together. Yue sacrifices herself to become the new Moon Spirit, allowing the waterbenders to regain their abilities and drive back the Fire Nation. Aang separates from the Ocean Spirit, and the Fire Nation retreats. In the aftermath, Aang decides that he must master the remaining three elements: water, earth, and fire. Meanwhile, Azula successfully invades Omashu and captures Bumi. Ozai learns that Sozin's Comet, which greatly enhances a firebender's abilities, will soon be returning.

=== Season 2 (2026) ===
No. overall	No. in season	Title	Directed by	Written by	Original release date
9	1	"Somewhere Safe"	Jabbar Raisani	Christine Boylan	June 25, 2026
Aang, Katara, and Sokka rescue a group of refugees fleeing Omashu from Fire Nation soldiers and reunite with Suki. They agree to accompany the refugees on their journey to the Earth Kingdom city of Ba Sing Se, as Sai intends to warn the Earth King of the threat posed by the impending Sozin's Comet. Aang also attempts to free an imprisoned Bumi, but he refuses rescue and instead counsels the Avatar to find another earthbending teacher. Aang and his friends help the refugees navigate the dangerous Serpent's Pass. After subduing the serpent that guards the pass, Katara teaches Aang how to heal the wounded creature using waterbending. Meanwhile, Zuko and Iroh are in hiding, posing as agricultural workers. While Iroh is content to make peace with their circumstances, Zuko blames Iroh for Ozai's ascension and separates, resolving to capture Aang. At a Fire Nation war council meeting, Azula proposes a bold strategy to capture Ba Sing Se. However, Ozai instead assigns the siege to General Vinh Tran and tasks Azula with retrieving Zuko. A bitter Azula later forces her friends, Ty Lee and Mai, to fight each other to prove their loyalty to her.
10	2	"A Fight, Once Begun"	Jabbar Raisani	Phinneas Kiyomura	June 25, 2026
In a series of flashbacks, Ozai pressures Zuko and Azula against each other, despite their mother's protests. She flees with her children, but they are caught. In the present, Zuko saves a young boy named Peng from bandits and is invited to dinner, where Zuko bonds with Peng's sister Fei. She invites Zuko to stay permanently, but he leaves after learning that Aang was nearby. Aang, Katara, and Sokka attend an earthbending wrestling match and witness a blind girl effortlessly defeat her opponent, The Boulder. They are invited to meet the wealthy Beifong family and discover that their daughter, Toph Beifong, is the same blind earthbender from the wrestling match. Aang tries to convince Toph to teach him earthbending, but she refuses due to her overprotective family's traditions. Disappointed, Aang leaves and is later confronted by both Zuko and Azula. Toph helps Aang and his friends hold off the firebenders, but when Iroh arrives to help Zuko, Azula wounds him with lightning and flees. Fei and Peng witness the altercation and are horrified. Toph refuses her mother's pleas to return home and becomes Aang's earthbending teacher. Toph's parents send The Boulder and Ji Shen to bring their daughter back.
11	3	"City of Walls and Secrets"	Anu Menon	Helen Shang	June 25, 2026
Iroh instructs Zuko how to redirect lightning to protect him from Azula. After boarding a ferry to Ba Sing Se to escape Azula, they encounter Jet, and Zuko helps him steal food and medicine. Toph attempts to teach Aang earthbending, and they stop The Boulder and Ji Shen from pursuing them. They reach the outer walls of Ba Sing Se and are escorted into the city. The group is given a villa to stay in and meet the cultural minister Long Feng. Sai informs Sokka that Suki has left the city, and the refugee Amita tells Katara about the legend of the Painted Lady. Aang and his friends attend a party at the royal palace. Sokka befriends Professor Zei, and Aang learns from General Sung that the citizens refuse to acknowledge the war outside the city. Aang attempts to meet Earth King Kuei, but he denies an audience when Long Feng brings him a message. Aang confides in Long Feng and they agree to collaborate to get Kuei's attention. At night, Katara dresses like the Painted Lady and brings stolen medicinal herbs to a sick girl. Sai is arrested by the Dai Li secret police and taken to Lake Laogai.
12	4	"The Water Falls, the Stones Emerge"	Anu Menon	Teresa Huang	June 25, 2026
Over several weeks, Aang practices earthbending with Toph and spends time with Long Feng, while Katara and Zuko secretly help people as the Painted Lady and Blue Spirit, respectively. Zei asks Sokka to help him find the hidden Spirit Library. Long Feng tells Aang that Sai was arrested after he helped Fire Nation spies in Omashu. Toph is forced to pay off a blackmailer who discovered that her parents sell weapons to the Fire Nation. General Sung agrees to help Aang get a message to the Earth King and informs him that Long Feng is the leader of the Dai Li. Jet tries to recruit Zuko to raid a camp of Fire Nation refugees. Zuko warns the camp's leader, Jeong Jeong, of Jet's attack. That night, both Zuko, as the Blue Spirit, and Katara, as the Painted Lady, defend the camp from Jet. A despondent Iroh helps reform a man who tried to rob him, and mourns the anniversary of his son's death. Suki spies on General Tran's camp, but is captured by Azula. Tran is later taken prisoner and brought to Ba Sing Se by Azula, Ty Lee, and Mai, who are disguised as Kyoshi Warriors.
13	5	"Ten Thousand Things"	Amit Gupta	Gabriel Llanas	June 25, 2026
Sokka and Zei search for the Spirit Library, and Katara recruits Jet to help. Iroh has a heart-to-heart talk with Zuko, promising to love him no matter his choices. Azula openly firebends to get arrested and meets Long Feng. With Zei and Jet's help, Aang and his friends find the library's location. Aang meditates so their spirits can enter the library. They meet Wan Shi Tong, who allows them to stay on the condition that any knowledge they gain will not be used for violence. Aang communes with Avatar Yangchen, who urges caution when using the Avatar State. Toph meets the spirit of Avatar Kyoshi who tells her of the "Day of Black Sun", a solar eclipse that renders all firebenders powerless. Sokka finds a planetarium and learns that the eclipse will occur before Sozin's Comet arrives. Zuko finds Aang meditating, but chooses to spare him. Zei warns Wan Shi Tong that his rule had been broken. He then kills Zei and attacks the others. Toph exits the library and keeps the entrance open, but is unable to stop Appa from being kidnapped. Jet sacrifices himself to delay Wan Shi Tong, allowing Aang, Katara, and Sokka to escape.
14	6	"The Parable of the Two Dragons"	Amit Gupta	Keely MacDonald	June 25, 2026
Determined to find Appa, Aang tries searching for him to no avail. Zuko suffers from a fever caused by his inner turmoil after choosing to leave Aang. He experiences an intense nightmare and awakens a changed man. He starts working at a tea shop with Iroh and goes on a date. Iroh attends a secret meeting with Jeong Jeong and is invited to join the White Lotus secret society. Azula convinces Long Feng to work with her and that General Sung has betrayed him. Believing that the Earth King can help find Appa, Sung sneaks Aang and his friends into the royal palace. Long Feng confronts Sung and threatens her daughter. Aang finds Kuei and tells the king about the eclipse and Sozin's Comet, but they are interrupted by Long Feng and Sung. They convince Kuei that Aang cannot be trusted. Aang and his friends later argue about withholding information from each other and separate. The Dai Li set a trap for Katara and arrest her and Zuko when he attempts to help. Hoping to find Suki, Sokka is instead captured by a disguised Ty Lee. Toph reunites with her mother. Using earthbending, Aang locates Appa underground.
15	7	"Something Broken"	Hiromi Kamata	Christine Boylan & Gabriel Llanas	June 25, 2026
Incarcerated beneath Lake Laogai, Katara and Zuko discuss their respective family histories and develop a newfound respect for each other. Toph's mother drugs Toph when she refuses to come home. Toph later awakens inside a metal cage. Feeling betrayed by her mother and wanting to return to her friends, she teaches herself metalbending to escape. Azula executes the military leadership of Ba Sing Se and puts General Tran in charge. Amita hides Aang from the Dai Li and informs him of Katara's arrest. Iroh learns of Zuko's capture and helps Aang break into the prison, where they free Sokka, Sai, Katara, and Zuko. Long Feng warns Aang that Azula has taken over the city. Aang then frees Appa and Toph arrives to reunite with her friends. Zuko and Azula reconcile over the loss of their mother and duel Aang and Katara together. Aang enters the Avatar State, but Azula strikes him with lightning. Iroh helps Katara carry Aang to safety and surrenders himself. The Fire Nation armies enter Ba Sing Se and Kuei watches Appa fly Aang and his friends from the city. Katara uses water from the Spirit Oasis to revive Aang, but he slips back into unconsciousness.

=== Season 3 ===
The episodes of the third season were written by Helen Shang, Teresa Huang, Emily Kim, Keely MacDonald, Christine Boylan, Phinneas Kiyomura, and Gabriel Llanas, respectively. The season is set to be released in 2027.

== Production ==
=== Development ===
In 2018, Netflix announced that a "reimagined" live-action remake of Avatar was to start production in 2019. The series' original creators, Michael Dante DiMartino and Bryan Konietzko, were initially announced to be the executive producers and showrunners. In June 2020, the creators departed the series due to creative differences. This was revealed after DiMartino published an open letter on his own website on August 12, 2020. The pair cited differences in their approach to the show compared with Netflix's vision, also citing a "negative and unsupporting" environment during their time with the studio; the duo ultimately received writing credits for the first and sixth episodes.

In August 2021, Albert Kim was officially announced as a writer, executive producer, and showrunner; he commented in a blog post: "My first thought was, 'Why? What is there I could do or say with the story that wasn't done or said in the original?' But the more I thought about it, the more intrigued I became. We'll be able to see bending in a real and visceral way we've never seen before." In the same post, Kim emphasized that "throughout this process, our byword has been 'authenticity'. To the story. To the characters. To the cultural influences. Authenticity is what keeps us going, both in front of the camera and behind it." Dan Lin, Lindsey Liberatore, Michael Goi, and Roseanne Liang were also announced as executive producers with Goi and Liang both directing episodes of the series. In the first season, each episode reportedly cost more than $15 million to make.

On March 6, 2024, the series was renewed for a second and third season, with it set to conclude with the latter. On April 4, 2024, it was announced that Kim would be stepping down as showrunner but would remain as an executive producer, while co-executive producer Christine Boylan and executive producer Jabbar Raisani would become showrunners for the second and third seasons.

=== Casting ===
Prior to their departure, DiMartino and Konietzko had revealed that they are committed to "culturally appropriate, non-whitewashed casting" according to a statement from Konietzko. Konietzko had said that he was hoping to include Dante Basco, the original voice actor of Zuko. In August 2021 following leaked casting reports, Netflix revealed the show's cast for the main four characters: Gordon Cormier, Kiawentiio, Ian Ousley and Dallas Liu as Aang, Katara, Sokka, and Zuko respectively. Kim felt that "this was a chance to showcase Asian and Indigenous characters as living, breathing people. Not just in a cartoon, but in a world that truly exists, very similar to the one we live in." In November 2021, Daniel Dae Kim, who previously voiced General Fong in the animated series and later Hiroshi Sato in The Legend of Korra, joined the cast as Fire Lord Ozai. Later that month, Paul Sun-Hyung Lee, Lim Kay Siu, and Ken Leung joined the cast of the series, playing Iroh, Gyatso, and Commander Zhao respectively. In December, Elizabeth Yu, Yvonne Chapman, Tamlyn Tomita, Casey Camp-Horinek and Maria Zhang were added to the cast, respectively playing Azula, Avatar Kyoshi, Yukari (a new character added as Suki's mother in replacement of the mayor of Kyoshi Island), Gran Gran and Suki.

In April 2022, Arden Cho and Momona Tamada joined the cast as June and Ty-Lee. Later that month, C. S. Lee was cast as Avatar Roku. In June 2022, A Martinez and Amber Midthunder were cast as Master Pakku and Princess Yue respectively. In July 2022, it was revealed that James Sie would reprise his role as the Cabbage Merchant from the animated series. In September 2022, additional roles were announced, with two of them being George Takei as the voice of Koh the Face Stealer and Randall Duk Kim as the voice of Wan Shi Tong. Takei previously voiced the Fire Nation Prison Rig Warden in the animated series, while Duk Kim had a minor role in the 2010 live-action film The Last Airbender.

In September 2024, Miyako was announced to have joined the main cast as Toph Beifong for the second season. In November 2024, Chin Han, Hoa Xuande, Justin Chien, Amanda Zhou, Crystal Yu, Kelemete Misipeka, Lourdes Faberes, and Rekha Sharma were announced to have joined the cast. In May 2025, Terry Chen, Dolly de Leon, Lily Gao, Madison Hu, and Dichen Lachman joined the cast for the second season while Jon Jon Briones, Tantoo Cardinal, and Adam Beach joined the cast for the third season.

=== Filming ===
Production and filming began in Vancouver, British Columbia on November 16, 2021. The series was filmed under the working titles Trade Winds and Blue Dawn. Principal photography wrapped on June 17, 2022. Stewart Whelan served as a cinematographer. The second season began filming on September 16, 2024, and wrapped in May 2025 while the third season began filming that same month and concluded later that year in November.

The first season relied heavily on StageCraft virtual production technology, whereas the second season shifts toward practical sets and production values, such as the large-scale construction of Ba Sing Se.

=== Visual effects ===
Visual effects for the series were handled by over twenty visual effects studios, including Framestore, DNEG, Rodeo FX, Scanline VFX and Image Engine.

=== Music ===
On February 16, 2023, it was confirmed that award-winning Japanese-American composer Takeshi Furukawa was attached to the project as its composer.

Jeremy Zuckerman, who composed music for the original show, was originally set to return to compose the music for the remake but later denied his involvement with the show after DiMartino and Konietzko left the project. The music was recorded at Synchron Stage in Vienna with the Synchron Stage Orchestra and Choir, in addition to the score being recorded in different places, including London at Angel Studios and Budapest at East Connection Music Recording.

== Marketing ==
Promotional poster incorporating several notable characters from the first season.

The first look of the four main characters of the series — Aang, Katara, Sokka and Zuko — was released at Netflix's Tudum fan event in June 2023, along with a teaser featuring the four elements in the show. This was followed by a first look at the characters from the Fire Nation in October 2023. On November 9, 2023, Netflix released the teaser trailer for the first season, while the full trailer was released on January 23, 2024. On December 10, 2025, Netflix released the teaser trailer for the second season. On May 21, 2026, the full trailer for the second season was released.

== Release ==
The eight-episode first season was released on Netflix on February 22, 2024. The seven-episode second season was released on June 25, 2026. The third and final season is set to be released in 2027.

== Reception ==
=== Critical response ===
Critical response of Avatar: The Last Airbender
Season	Rotten Tomatoes	Metacritic
1	62% (86 reviews)	55 (27 reviews)
2	71% (24 reviews)	68 (7 reviews)

The review aggregator website Rotten Tomatoes gave the first season 62% approval rating based on 86 critic reviews, with an average of rated reviews of 6/10. The website's critics consensus reads, "Avatar: The Last Airbender serves as a solid live-action entry point into the beloved franchise, although it only sporadically recaptures the magic of its source material." Metacritic, which uses a weighted average, assigned a score of 55 out of 100 based on 27 critics, indicating "mixed or average" reviews.

Jack Seale from The Guardian gave the series a positive review, saying "The landscapes sparkle, there is a giant six-legged flying bison that carries everyone spectacularly from place to place through the clouds and the young cast are up to the task." Josh Yehl from IGN gave a generally positive review, saying "The live-action Avatar: The Last Airbender series enriches the original story with meaningful new material, but its breakneck pacing, exposition-heavy dialogue, and hit-or-miss effects aren't precisely in balance." James Marsh from the South China Morning Post gave an extremely positive review, "Hardened devotees of the source material will inevitably find minor cosmetic and composite changes to quibble about, but critics will be hard-pressed to argue against Kim and his crew's heart being in the right place." Kenneth Lowe from Paste praised the representation of Asian and Indigenous people in the series. He highlighted that "no show has taken a more forceful and intentional step toward addressing it than Netflix's Avatar: The Last Airbender live-action adaptation".

Anita Singh from The Telegraph gave a mixed response: "It's solid entertainment: fast-moving, action-packed, with decent fight scenes and some appealing performances, all done on a generous Netflix budget. Don't expect subtlety – this is aimed at children so the characters and plot are broadly drawn." Variety opined that, while it wasn't as bad as the 2010 film The Last Airbender, it "will leave fans wishing the streamer had left DiMartino and Konietzko's masterpiece alone." Kelly Lawler from USA Today called the show "a corrupted facsimile of the original" and claimed "it's clear after two failed attempts to tell this story in live action that the greatness of Avatar was because of its animation, not in spite of it."

The second season has a 68% approval rating on Rotten Tomatoes, based on 22 reviews, with an average of rated reviews of 6.1/10. The website's critics consensus states, "Although a few narrative detours upend anticipated storylines and brawls, this Avatar still knows how to entertain and be serviceably capable of saving the world." On Metacritic, it has a weighted average score of 68 out of 100 based on 7 reviews, indicating "generally favorable" reviews.

=== Viewership ===
Avatar: The Last Airbender topped the weekly global Netflix chart from February 19–25, with 154.4 million hours watched by 21.2 million viewers in its first week. During its second week, the series remained atop but viewership decreased to 144.2 million hours watched by 19.9 million viewers and ranked among the top 10 in 92 countries and at number one in 76 countries. It thus amassed 298.6 million hours watched by 41.1 million viewers in less than two weeks of its release. Nielsen reported that on the "streaming charts for the week of February 19–25", Avatar: The Last Airbender was number one in the "originals" category and also number one overall "with 2.56B minutes viewed".

=== Accolades ===
The show was nominated for two 2024 Kids' Choice Awards: Favorite Family TV Show and Gordon Cormier for Favorite Male TV Star (Family). It was nominated for two 2024 Emmy Awards: Outstanding Sound Editing for a Comedy or Drama Series (One Hour) for the episode "Legends" and Outstanding Special Visual Effects in a Season or a Movie. It was nominated for the 2025 Visual Effects Society Award for Outstanding Effects Simulations in an Episode, Commercial, Game Cinematic or Real-Time Project. It was nominated for three 2026 Kids' Choice Awards: Favorite TV Show (Kids), Gordon Cormier for Favorite Male TV Star (Kids) and Elizabeth Yu for Favorite Female TV Star (Kids).
