= Kiawentiio =

First Nations actress (born 2006)

- Born: Kiawenti:io Tarbell; 28 April 2006 (age 20); Akwesasne, Ontario, Canada
- Citizenship: Canada; United States
- Occupations: Actress; singer
- Years active: 2019–present

Kiawenti:io Tarbell (/ˌɡjɑːwənˈdiːjoʊ/, born 28 April 2006), known mononymously as Kiawentiio, is a Mohawk actress and singer. She made her television debut in the third season of the CBC series Anne with an E (2019) and her film debut in Beans (2020). She currently stars as Katara in the Netflix live-action remake of Avatar: The Last Airbender (2024–present).

== Early life and education ==
Kiawentiio is a Mohawk Wolf Clan member. She was born into a Mohawk family in Akwesasne, a reserve that is located on both sides of the Canada–United States border, spanning the St. Lawrence River in Quebec province and New York State. On the US side, this is also known as the St. Regis Mohawk Reservation. Her mother Barbara works in their community’s cultural restoration efforts, and her father Corey is a volunteer firefighter and building inspector for their tribe.

Her first name means "nice morning" in Kanienʼkéha (Mohawk language). She grew up in a house on Kawehno:ke (also known as Cornwall Island) and attended Akwesasne Freedom School and Cornwall Collegiate and Vocational School. She is based between Ontario, Quebec, and New York, and has dual citizenship in Canada and the United States.

== Career ==
Tarbell was one of 200 indigenous Canadian actresses to audition for the role of Ka'kwet, who is featured in an indigenous story line in season three of Anne with an E, a television series that is set in Prince Edward Island. She had to learn to speak the Miꞌkmaq language and obtain an understanding of the tribe, and their history and culture.

She also starred in the title role of the film Beans (2020) as a 12-year-old Mohawk girl living in Kahnawake in 1990, at the time of the Oka Crisis. The semi-autobiographical film was written and directed by Tracey Deer (Mohawk). The film was featured in the opening of the New York International Children's Film Festival that year.

Kiawentiio has appeared as recurring character Maya Thomas in the Peacock sitcom Rutherford Falls (2021). In 2021, she was selected to portray Katara in the Netflix live action version of Avatar: The Last Airbender series. Already a fan of the original version, she had asked her agent to keep an eye out for that specific audition. The series premiered on 2024 and was renewed for a second and third season, filmed that same year, with Season 2 releasing in 2026.

Kiawentiio makes a short yet significant appearance as guest star in the series It: Welcome to Derry, plus starring a 30 minute Halloween special, as Necani, a member of the fictional Sqoteawapskot tribe.

== Filmography ==
=== Film ===
Year(s)	Title	Role(s)	Notes
2020	Beans	Beans / Tekehentahkhwa	
2022	N'xaxaitkw	Zarya	Short

=== Television ===
Year(s)	Title	Role(s)	Notes
2019	Anne with an E	Ka'kwet	5 episodes
2021	Rutherford Falls	Maya Thomas	2 episodes
2023	What If...?	Wahta (voice)	Episode: "What If... Kahhori Reshaped the World?"
2024–present	Avatar: The Last Airbender	Katara	Main role
2025–present	It: Welcome to Derry	Necani	2 episodes + Halloween Special

== Discography ==
=== EPs ===
Title	Details
In My Head	Released: 5 March 2021

=== Singles ===
- Light at the End (2020) from Beans
- This Moment (2021), part of EP In My Head
- Saying Goodnight (feat. Rasentonkwa Tarbell, 2021), part of EP In My Head
- Unfamiliar (2021), part of EP In My Head
- In What World (2021), part of EP In My Head

== Awards and nominations ==
Year	Award	Category	Work	Result	Ref
2019	Vancouver Film Critics Circle	One to Watch	Beans	Won	
