= Emi Hashino =

Japanese comedian and stage actress

- Born: 綱島 恵美 (Tsunashima Emi); October 23, 1973 (age 52); Kagoshima, Kagoshima Prefecture, Japan
- Other name: Emi-chan
- Occupations: Actress, Comedian, Japanese Talent
- Years active: 1990–present

Emi Hashino (はしの えみ, Hashino Emi) is a Japanese comedian and stage actress. She is usually starring in TBS's long-term program, King's brunch, where she is a popular regular.

She is perhaps most recognizable from her "Kaimono Suki-na-Hime-sama" ("The Shopping-Loving Princess") character, and is affectionately called "Emi chan" by other TV tarentos or announcers.

== Dubbing ==
- Race to Witch Mountain, Dr. Alex Friedman (Carla Gugino)
- Top Gun (2005 DVD edition), Carole Bradshaw (Meg Ryan)
