= Dallas Liu =

American actor (born 2001)

- Liu at GalaxyCon in 2024
- Born: Dallas James Liu; August 21, 2001 (age 25); Los Angeles, California, U.S.
- Occupation: Actor
- Years active: 2009–present

Chinese name
- Traditional Chinese: 劉家駒
- Simplified Chinese: 刘家驹
Transcriptions
Standard Mandarin
- Hanyu Pinyin: Liú Jiājū

Dallas James Liu (born August 21, 2001) is an American actor. Liu made his acting debut as young Jin Kazama in Tekken (2009). He has gone on to appear in the television series Pen15 as Shuji Ishii-Peters and as Carter in Legendary Dudas. He portrays Zuko in the Netflix series Avatar: The Last Airbender, a live-action remake of the animated series of the same name.

== Early life ==
Liu grew up in San Gabriel Valley, California. Liu practices Japanese Shotokan and competed in the North American Sport Karate Association. He began practicing martial arts when he was 5 years old and stopped competing internationally at 13 years old.

== Career ==
Liu made his film debut as young Jin Kazama in the 2009 film Tekken. He was referred to the audition by one of his martial arts teachers. Liu's manager initially found him through karate videos uploaded onto YouTube. He had a recurring role as Carter on Nickelodeon's Legendary Dudas.

Liu played Maya Erskine's older brother Shuji on the Hulu dramedy Pen15.

Liu played Taylor King in Snapchat's young-adult drama series, Players. Liu later appeared in the 2021 Marvel film, Shang-Chi and the Legend of the Ten Rings as the younger brother of Awkwafina's character Katy.

On September 26, 2020, Liu did a virtual reading of Seven Minutes in Heaven for the play's 10th anniversary.

On August 12, 2021, Netflix revealed that Liu was cast as Zuko in their live action television adaptation of Avatar: The Last Airbender.

On January 9, 2025, Liu made his voice acting debut as Shin Asakura in the anime series Sakamoto Days.

== Personal life ==
Liu is of Chinese and Indonesian descent. He has a younger brother, Dylan Liu.

== Filmography ==
=== Film ===
Year	Film	Role	Notes
2009	Tekken	young Jin Kazama	
2015	Underdog Kids	Young Jimmy	
2017	Ella	Abe	Short film
2021	Shang-Chi and the Legend of the Ten Rings	Ruihua Chen	
2023	The Slumber Party	Mikey	Disney Channel Original Movie
2025	Shutter Bird	Ray	Short film

=== Television ===
Year(s)	Title	Role(s)	Notes
2013	Mortal Kombat: Legacy	Young Bi-Han	Episode: "Liu Kang and Kung Lao Reunite in Macau"
2014	Enormous	Boy	Episode: "Enormous"
2014	Bones	Riley	Episode: "The Mutilation of the Master Manipulator"
2015	Gortimer Gibbon's Life on Normal Street	Yoshi	Episode: "Gortimer vs. The Terrible Touch-Up"
2016	CSI: Cyber	Jake Hazelton	Episode: "Legacy"
2016	Hopefuls	Reed	TV Movie
2016	Legendary Dudas	Carter	5 episodes
2018	The Who Was? Show	Bruce Lee	4 episodes
2019–2021	Pen15	Shuji Ishii-Peters	14 episodes
2019	No Good Nick	Pete	2 episodes
2020	Players	Taylor King	8 episodes
2024–present	Avatar: The Last Airbender	Zuko	Main role
2025–present	Sakamoto Days	Shin Asakura	Voice, English dub
