= Live action =

Cinematography, videography not produced using animation

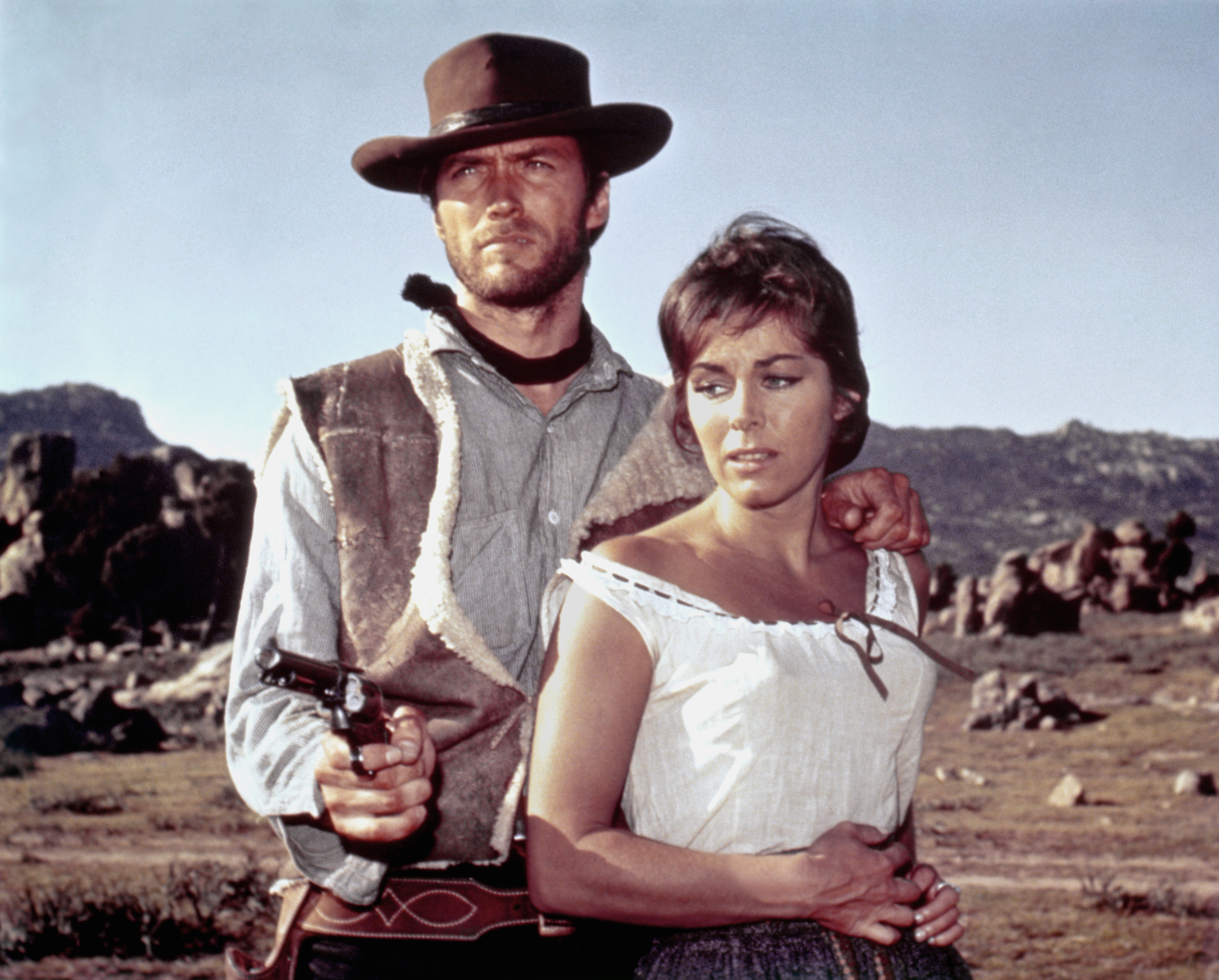
Live action movies, such as A Fistful of Dollars, use photography to depict settings and characters as they appear in life. In this example, Clint Eastwood and Marianne Koch appear in a real-world location.

Live action is the most common form of cinematography or videography, which uses a camera to record living actors, by a camera operator under the supervision of a cinematographer. Live action is used to define film, video games or similar visual media.

Live action is in contrast with animations. Some works combine live action with animation to create a live-action animated feature film. Photorealistic animation, particularly modern computer animation, is sometimes erroneously described as "live action", as in the case of some media reports about Disney's The Lion King (2019 remake). According to the Cambridge English Dictionary, live action involves "real people or animals, not models, or images that are drawn, or produced by computer".

== Overview ==
As the normal process of making visual media involves live action, the term itself is usually superfluous. However, it makes an important distinction in situations in which one might normally expect animation, such as when the work is adapted from a video game, a comic book, or an animated cartoon.

The phrase "live action" also occurs within an animation context to refer to non-animated characters. In a live-action animated film such as Space Jam, Who Framed Roger Rabbit, or Mary Poppins in which humans and cartoons coexist. In this case, the "live-action" characters are the "real" actors, such as Michael Jordan, Bob Hoskins and Julie Andrews, as opposed to the animated "actors", such as Roger and Jessica Rabbit.

As use of computer-generated imagery (CGI) in films has become a major trend, some critics, such as Mark Langer, have discussed the relationship between live action and animation. New films that use computer-generated special effects can not be compared to live-action films using cartoon characters because of the perceived realism of both styles combined.

== Live action vs. animation ==
In producing a movie, both live action and animation have their own pros and cons. Unlike animation, live action involves the photography of actors and actresses, as well as sets and props making the movie seem personal and as close to reality as possible. The only drawback is one's budget. On the other hand, animation works well in conveying abstract ideas but it generally takes much longer to produce.

== See also ==
- Animation
- List of actors who have played animated characters
- Footage
- List of films with live action and animation
- List of live-action films based on cartoons and comics
- List of live-action puppet films
