= Ian Ousley =

American actor (born c. 2002)

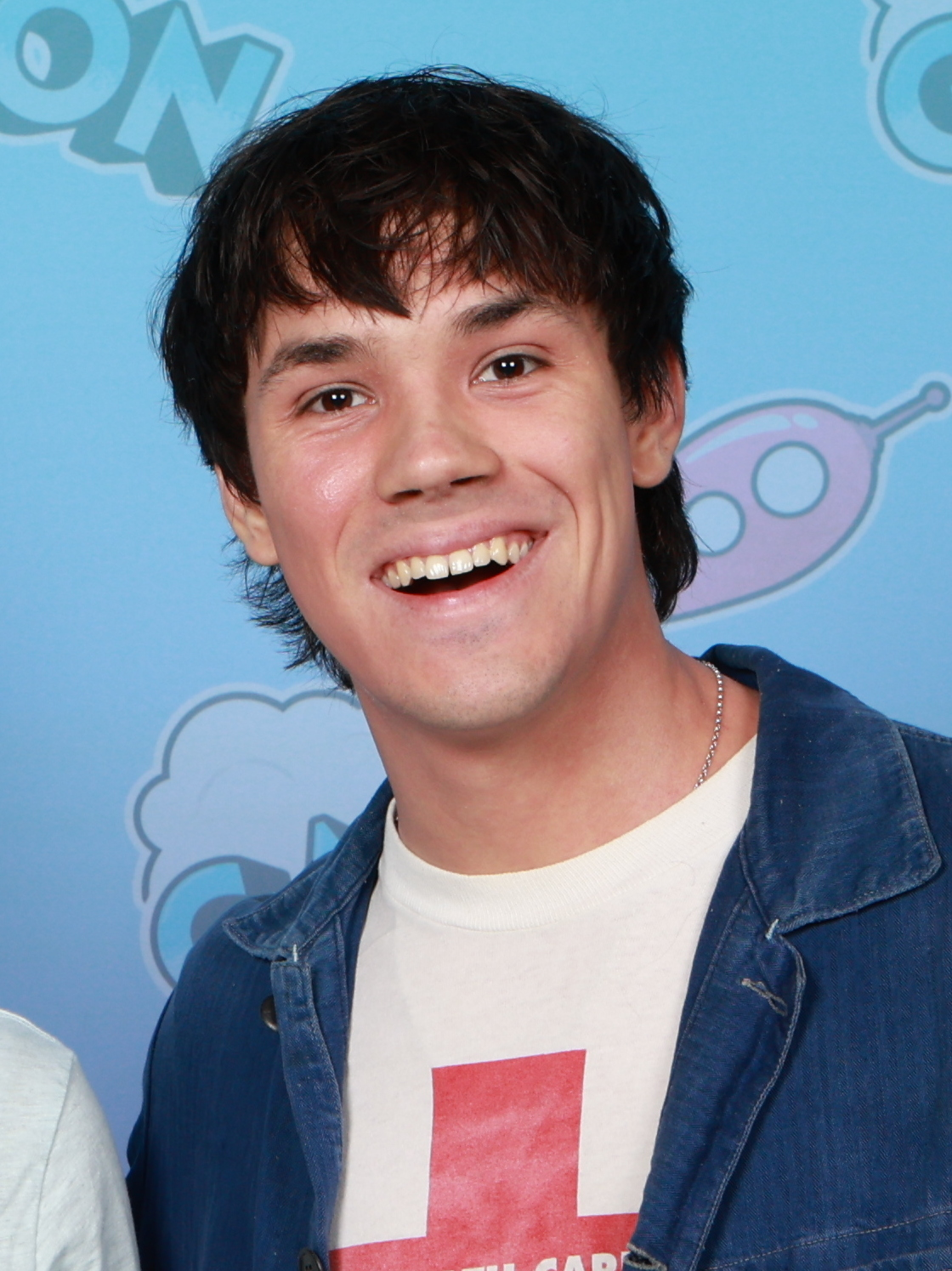
- Ousley at GalaxyCon Raleigh in 2024
- Born: Ian Luke Ousley; March 28, 2002 (age 24); College Station, Texas
- Occupation: Actor
- Years active: 2019–present
- Known for: Avatar: The Last Airbender

Ian Luke Ousley (born March 28, 2002) is an American actor. He is best known for his portrayal of Sokka in Avatar: The Last Airbender, the live-action adaptation of the Nickelodeon series of the same name.

== Biography ==
Ousley was born on March 28, 2002, in College Station, Texas. He began practicing taekwondo at the age of 9 and competed nationally for five years, later earning a third-degree black belt in 2018. He appeared in three episodes of 13 Reasons Why in 2019 and 2020.

In August 2021, Ousley was cast as Sokka in the live-action adaptation of Avatar: The Last Airbender. When his casting was announced, an official bio describing him as a "mixed-race, Native American" and a "Cherokee tribe member" was released. However, it was later reported by the Cherokee Phoenix that he is not a citizen of any of the three federally recognized Cherokee tribes in the United States, and is instead a member of the Southern Cherokee Nation of Kentucky, an organization that self-identifies as a tribe. The organization has received some acknowledgement at the state and municipal level in Kentucky, but is not recognized as a tribe by the state government, the federal government, or any of the three federally recognized Cherokee tribes.

== Filmography ==
=== Film ===
Year	Title	Role	Notes	Ref.
2025	The Runner	Everett	Short	
2025	Nine	Ethan	Short	

=== Television ===
Year	Title	Role	Notes	Ref.
2019–2020	13 Reasons Why	Robby Corman	3 episodes	
2019	Sorry for Your Loss	Brayden	1 episode	
2020	Young Sheldon	Jeremy	1 episode	
2021	Big Shot	Bodhi	2 episodes	
2021	Physical	Zeke Breem	Season 1 only; 4 episodes	
2024–present	Avatar: The Last Airbender	Sokka	Main role	
