= Emiko Sato =

Japanese cross-country skier (born 1971)

Personal information
- Nationality: Japanese
- Born: 13 May 1971 (age 53); Yamanouchi, Japan

Sport
- Sport: Cross-country skiing

Emiko Sato (佐藤 恵美子, Satō Emiko, born 13 May 1971) is a Japanese cross-country skier. She competed in the women's 15 kilometre classical at the 1998 Winter Olympics.
