= Emiko Yamashita =

Japanese handball player (born 1953)

Emiko Yamashita (山下 恵美子, Yamashita Emiko; born 8 February 1953) is a Japanese former handball player who competed in the 1976 Summer Olympics.
