= Maria Zhang =

Polish actress (born 1999)

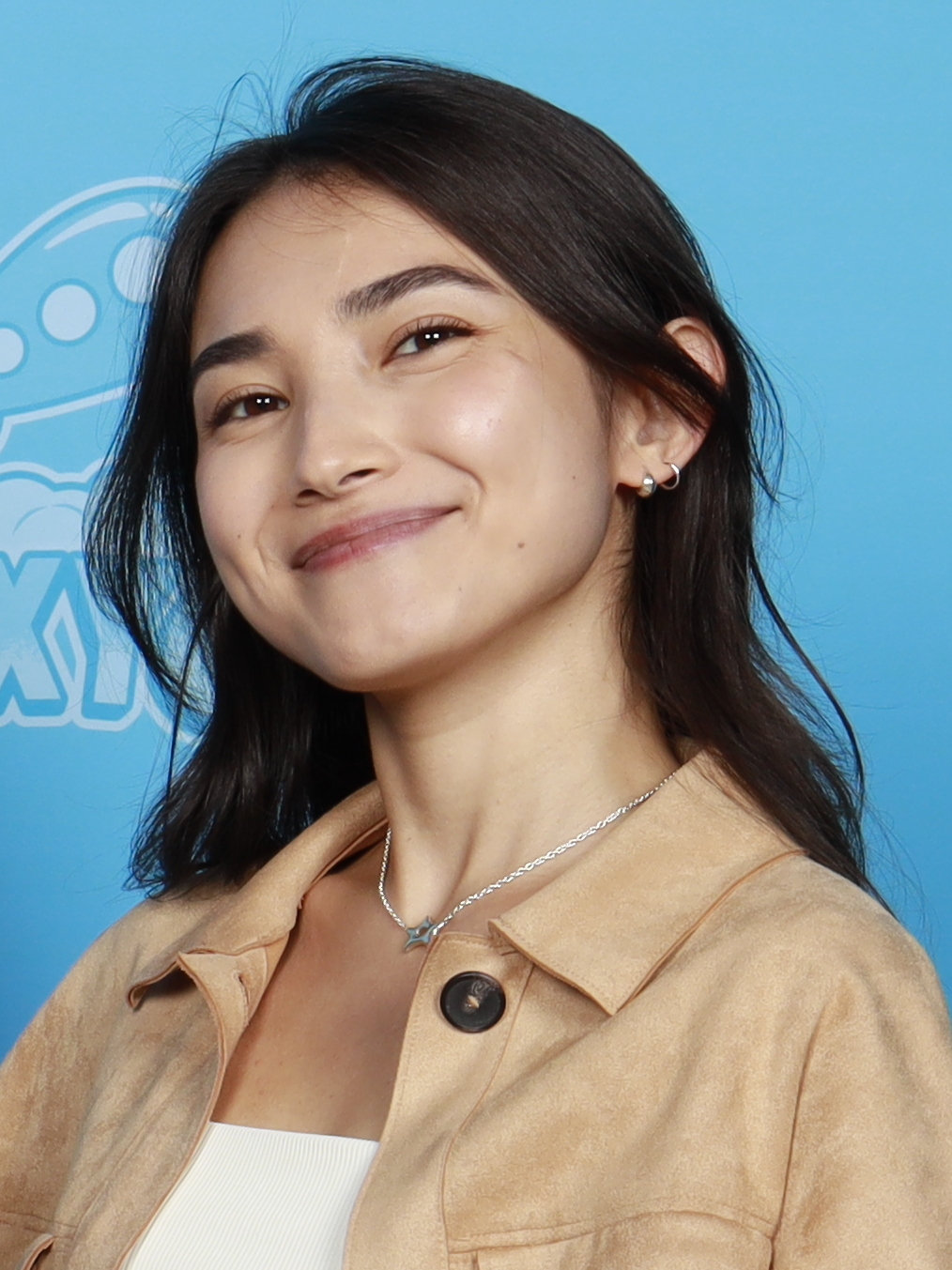
- Zhang at GalaxyCon Raleigh in 2024
- Born: 8 August 1999 (age 27); Kraków, Poland
- Occupation: Actress
- Years active: 2018–present

Maria Zhang (born 8 August 1999), is a Polish actress. She appears as Suki in the 2024 live-action remake of Avatar: The Last Airbender.

== Early life ==
Zhang was born in Poland to a Chinese father and a Polish mother. Around age one, Zhang and her parents moved to Beijing, where she grew up. She spent summers with her family in rural Poland and speaks Mandarin Chinese, Polish, and English.

While in Poland at age twelve, Zhang and her sister Zofia Zhang came across a newspaper clipping of a community theater group's casting call. Later, she moved to Southern California to attend USC. Both of Zhang's parents are artists.

== Career ==
Zhang starred in the 2021 short film All I Ever Wanted. The film was an official selection at the Los Angeles Asian Pacific Film Festival.

In December 2021, Zhang was cast as Suki in the Netflix's Avatar: The Last Airbender. Released in 2024, the series is a live-action adaptation of the original 2005 animated series.

== Filmography ==
=== Film ===
Year	Title	Role	Notes
2018	Continuum	Dayna Hu	Short film, credited as Marysia Zhang
2019	Dear Mom	Vivian	Short film
2021	All I Ever Wanted	Jennifer	Short film

=== Television ===
Year	Title	Role	Notes
2024–present	Avatar: The Last Airbender	Suki	5 episodes
2025	The Rookie	Kylie Thomas	2 episodes
2025	A Man on the Inside	Amber van Hojk	1 episode

=== Web ===
Year	Title	Role	Notes
2020	WorkInProgress: A Comedy Web-Series	Ani Dinh	5 episodes
