= Gordon Cormier =

Canadian actor (born 2009)

- Cormier at GalaxyCon Raleigh in 2024
- Born: October 8, 2009 (age 17); Vancouver, British Columbia, Canada
- Citizenship: Canadian
- Education: Vancouver Acting School; Vancouver Young Actors School (VYAS)
- Occupation: Actor
- Years active: 2019–present

Gordon Cormier (born October 8, 2009) is a Canadian actor. He played Joe in The Stand (2020) and portrayed Aang in the Netflix live-action Avatar: The Last Airbender series.

== Early life ==
Cormier was born and grew up in Vancouver. His mother is of Filipino descent from Santa Rosa, Laguna in the Philippines. Cormier is a Christian.

== Career ==
Cormier became interested in acting while young. He has starred in a Canadian cartoon series. His debut role was in Get Shorty (2019), where he played Guatemalan Urchin. He also appeared in Lost in Space (2019).

His role in The Stand (2020) as Joe, a young boy who becomes the ward of Nadine Cross, brought him mainstream attention.

In August 2021, he was cast as the titular character Aang in Avatar: The Last Airbender, a Netflix live-action remake of the animated series of the same name.

== Filmography ==
=== Film ===
Year(s)	Title	Role(s)	Notes
2023	Ready Jet Go! Space Camp	Mitchell Peterson	Voice role

=== Television ===
Year(s)	Title	Role(s)	Notes
2019	Get Shorty	Guatemalan Urchin	Episode: "What to Do When You Land"
2019	A Christmas Miracle	Jacob	Hallmark Original Movie
2019	Christmas Under the Stars	Wise Man	TV movie
2019	Lost in Space	Young Boy	Episode: "Ninety-Seven"
2020–2021	The Stand	Joe	Recurring role; 8 episodes
2021	Two Sentence Horror Stories 1	Young Charles	Episode: "Imposter"
2021	Turner & Hooch	Mountain Scout	Episode: "The Fur-gitive"
2021	Gabby Duran & The Unsittables	Tarley	Episode: "Zeke To The Future"
2022	Team Zenko Go	Luis / Louis	Voice role
2024–present	Avatar: The Last Airbender	Aang	Main role

== Awards and nominations ==
Year	Award	Category	Work	Result
2024	Kids' Choice Awards	Favorite Male TV Star (Family)	Avatar: The Last Airbender	Nominated
2026	Kids' Choice Awards	Favorite Male TV Star (Kids)	Avatar: The Last Airbender	Pending
