= Harionago =

Japanese mythological ghoul

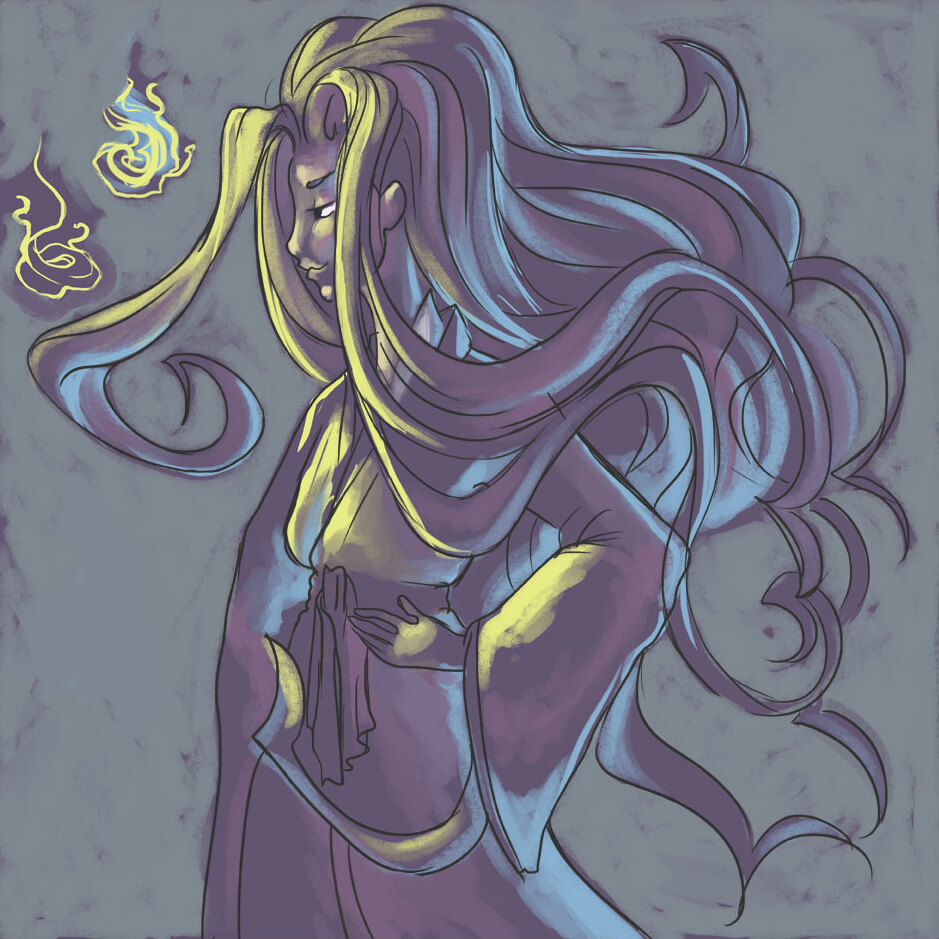
- Modern illustration of Harionago

Creature information
- Other name: Warai-onago
- Grouping: Yokai

Origin
- Country: Japan
- Region: Shikoku

Harionago (/hɑːriːɒnɑːɡoʊ/, hah-ree-on-ah-go, "barbed woman") or Warai-onago (/wɑːrɑːiːɒnɑːɡoʊ/, wah-rah-ee-oh-na-go, "laughing girl") is a yokai in Japanese folklore that preys on young men.

== Description ==
Harionago appears along roads on the island of Shikoku as an attractive young woman with long black hair. The strands of her hair are prehensile and tipped with sharp barbed hooks.

When a man approaches her on a pathway, she laughs and, if he laughs in return, she attacks the man with her barbed hair. Once she has him trapped, she devours him. In one story, the man was able to survive the encounter by breaking free and locking himself in his house. Harionago left many deep gashes in the wooden door before giving up.
