= Emi Wong =

Hong Kong YouTuber

Emi Wong; 王樂婷
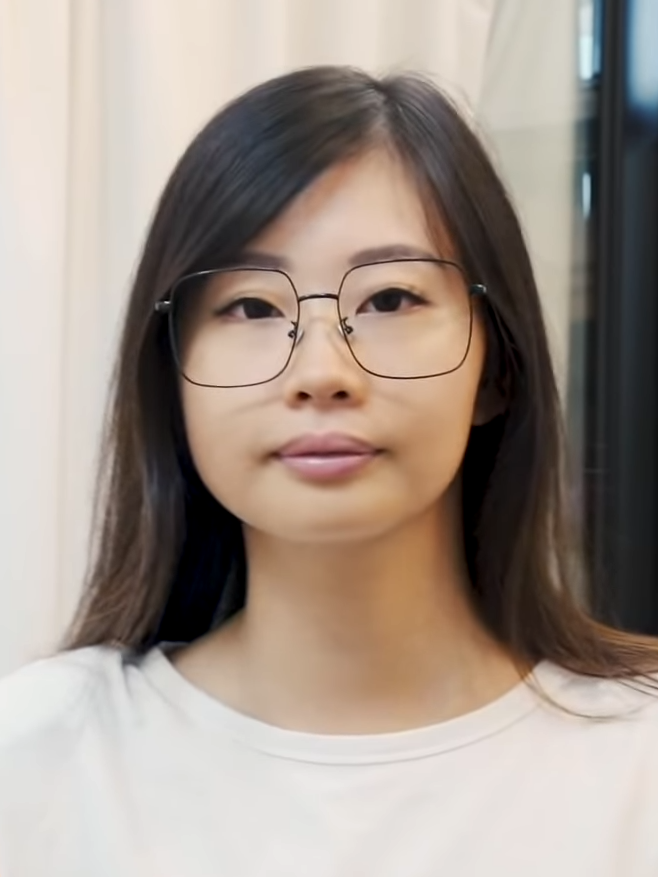
- Wong in a YouTube video, 2021
- Born: Emily Wong Lok-ting; January 1992 (age 34); Toronto, Ontario, Canada
- Years active: 2017–present

YouTube information
- Channel: emi wong
- Genres: Fitness; lifestyle; travelling
- Subscribers: 7.42 million
- Views: 1.20 billion

Chinese name
- Traditional Chinese: 王樂婷
- Simplified Chinese: 王乐婷
Transcriptions
Standard Mandarin
- Hanyu Pinyin: Wáng Lètíng
Yue: Cantonese
- Jyutping: Wong^{4} Lok^{6} Ting^{4}
- Last updated: 23 April 2026

Emily Wong Lok-ting (traditional Chinese: 王樂婷; simplified Chinese: 王乐婷; born January 1992) is a Hong Kong YouTuber who makes fitness, lifestyle, and travelling videos. She started posting videos on her YouTube channel, Emi Wong • StayFitandTravel, in April 2017.

Born in Toronto, Ontario, Wong was raised in Hong Kong. She attended local Hong Kong schools and graduated in 2013 from the University of Hong Kong, where she studied global management and international business. After a stint as a headhunter and management trainee at the alcoholic beverage company Pernod Ricard, Wong joined Lululemon Athletica, where she worked in the social media division. While at Lululemon, she started her YouTube channel to make additional income. Her exercise videos received the most views, and she grew into an influencer in the realms of fashion, beauty, lifestyle, and fitness. She reached 100,000 subscribers in four months and 500,000 subscribers in a year, prompting her to quit her full-time job at Lululemon to become a full-time YouTuber in August 2018. With over seven million subscribers, Wong is the Hong Kong YouTuber with the most subscribers.

== Early life and early career ==
Emily Wong was born in January 1992 in Toronto, Ontario, and moved as a baby to Hong Kong, where she was raised. She exclusively attended local Hong Kong schools. Her primary school's instruction was in Chinese, while her secondary school's instruction was in English except for the two subjects of Chinese and Chinese history. She has one brother who is two years her junior. In her youth, she learned to play the piano, reaching Grade 8 before stopping because she did not enjoy playing the instrument. Her first language is Cantonese, and through viewing television shows from the United States, she became proficient in English as an additional language. On the Hong Kong Certificate of Education Examination, she received 7As.

Wong graduated in 2013 from the University of Hong Kong, where she studied global management and international business. In her first job after graduating from university at the alcoholic beverages company Pernod Ricard, Wong worked as a headhunter, a role she did not like because it required a salesperson personality that she felt she lacked. At Pernod Ricard, Wong was a management trainee. Her company sent her to do work in South Korea in 2015. She later joined the Hong Kong branch of Lululemon Athletica, where she worked in the social media division for two years until around August 2018. As she did social media, she received an advanced personal trainer certification.

She had an appendectomy around one year following graduation. After the surgery, she experienced complications that required her to visit the hospital where she had stomach cramps, typically following eating. From age 18 until 25 or 26, three to four times every week she would "drink herself into unconsciousness". She went to Lan Kwai Fong on weekends to drink. On Instagram, she viewed posters' photos of what they looked like prior to and following their workout regimen. The content drove Wong, who was then at the start of her 20s, into exercising twice to thrice daily with the aim of having "toned abs". She was particularly motivated by the fitness author Kayla Itsines's Bikini Body Guide, which she purchased and followed. During employee dinners at her company Pernod Ricard, she was fanatically engrossed with the high-calorie food that was served. When her plate of chicken had sauce on it, she would clean the sauce away with hot water. At her nadir, she suffered from bulimia in which she would eat and then throw up for several months. At a Valentine's Day buffet, she ate a large number of French fries and threw up. When Chad, her boyfriend, questioned her, Wong admitted that her inordinate time in the bathroom was owing to her affliction with bulimia. Chad told her about the negative health effects of bulimia including a higher likelihood of getting cancer. He got her to agree to always tell him whenever she vomited, so that he could warn her about the negative health effects again. Through his reminders, she gradually purged less often until she completely ceased to do so. By 2020, she limited her weekly exercise to doing high-intensity interval training four times.

== YouTube career ==
Emi Wong and Chad in a 2021 Mayao makeover video

With increased responsibilities but a lack of appreciation given for her work, Wong found her full-time job to be unsatisfying and could not envision doing it long-term. She was disheartened by getting only a HK$1,000 (US$129) raise. She sought other opportunities to make a living such as becoming a part-time personal trainer. Unable to allot sufficient time to being a personal trainer, she considered becoming a YouTuber after a friend told her how it was an opportunity to make money, and a coworker supported the idea. Wong started posting videos on her YouTube channel in April 2017. Her initial motivation was to make an additional HK$2,000 to HK$3,000 (US$250 to US$380) every month through the YouTube channel. Her channel originally went by the name "Emi Wong • StayFitandTravel". Wong's first video was in English to accommodate her boyfriend, whose English-language skills were superior to his Cantonese-language proficiency, because she was nervous and hoped to have someone else join her. While she speaks Cantonese in a number of her later vlogs, her videos largely are in English. The English-language content attracted foreign viewership as well as Overseas Chinese who are immigrants or studying abroad. HK01 said Wong was similar to fellow fitness YouTuber Coffee Lam. It found that Wong had over double the number of subscribers of Lam in 2020 because Wong produced her content in English. That allowed her to have broader viewership including from places like Europe, the United Kingdom, the United States, and Southeast Asian countries. Around 85% of her viewers are female.

To produce the content, Wong devised, filmed, and edited the videos with the editing process for a single video needing 12 hours. She consistently posted two videos every week. In 2017, four months after creating the channel, she reached 100,000 subscribers. Within one year of creating the channel, she received 500,000 subscribers which prompted her to resign from her social media role to become a full-time YouTuber in August 2018. Wong had attended events from brands including some held overseas which required taking time off from work. Not wanting to burden her coworkers by frequently taking time off contributed to her decision to leave her job. After becoming a YouTuber, Wong grew into an influencer in the realms of fashion, beauty, lifestyle, and fitness. In 2021, Forbes included her in the Forbes 30 Under 30 Asia list for Media, Marketing & Advertising. Wong created sponsored content for the luxury fashion house Chanel, the cosmetics company Charlotte Tilbury Beauty, and the fashion house Loewe. With over six million subscribers in 2023, Wong is the Hong Kong YouTuber with the most subscribers.

Wong's exercise videos receive the most views. Her high-intensity interval training video, which was 10 minutes long, was watched more than eight million times. In a 2020 interview with the South China Morning Post, Wong attributed her channel's success to how the workouts could be completed at people's residences. She said that the videos, which lasted between 10 and 20 minutes long, could be done by people who lacked the time or money to pay daily visits to the gym. Her website hosts time-bound workout courses such as challenges that take 10 days or 15 days. Lifestyle Asia deemed the classes be free and "easy to follow". Elle said of her videos, "The movements are not difficult and it will be very impressive after practice, even beginners who are just getting started in fitness can keep up". At the beginning of the COVID-19 pandemic in early 2020, she posted a video where she used a carpet sweeper to do lunges and bottles of laundry detergent to do squats. Telling her viewers that sanitising and working out are compatible, she added a caption to the view that said "Keep both hygiene and immune system up". Wong posts other fitness content such as following a healthy diet. She did a "Marriage Q&A" with the actress Grace Wong in 2021.

HK01's Ka-chun Au reported that numerous fitness instructors have criticised the accuracy of Wong's fitness videos. Choosing one video to critique. Au said that the punches she threw in the video did not involve turning her hips and waist so are not how it is done in boxing. Au further criticised Wong's movement that she called "arm chest expansion", which the reporter found "increases the chance of shoulder joint strain" by "failing to maintain stability".

== Personal life ==
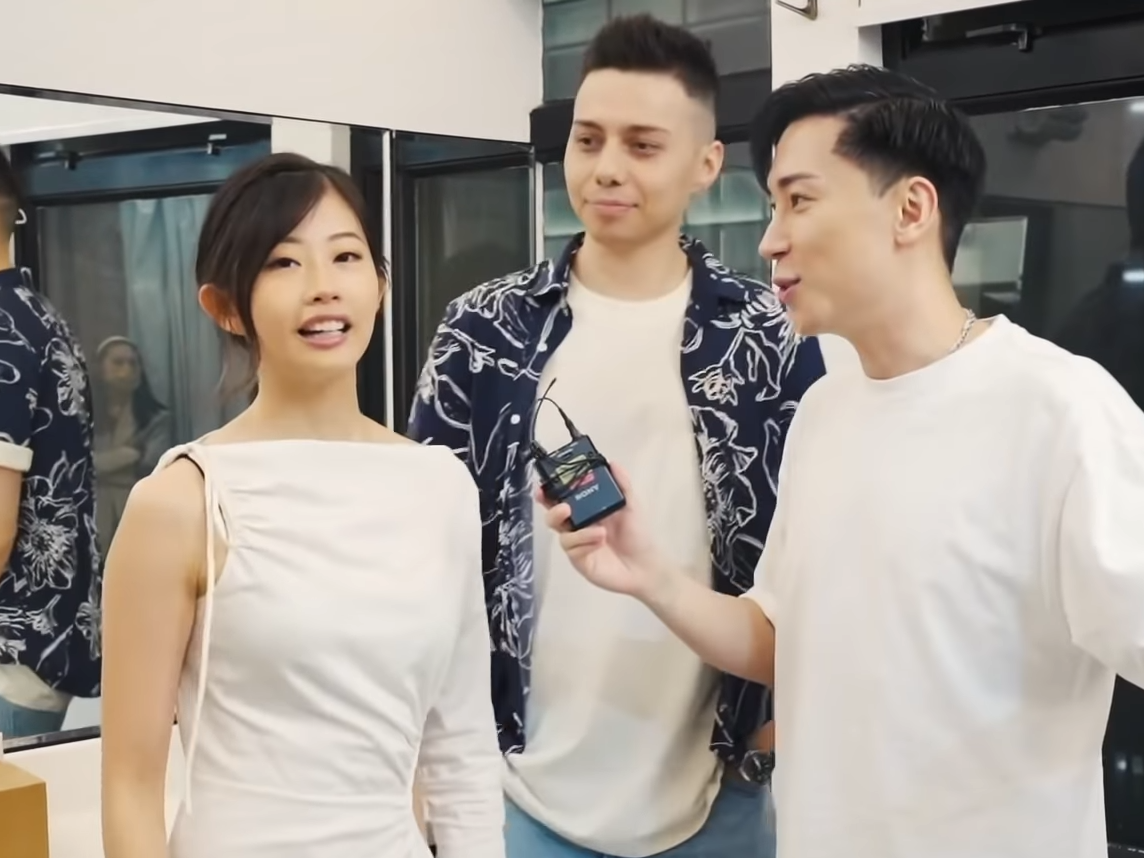
Emi Wong, Chad, and Mayao in 2021

Wong met Chad in September 2013. She married him in February 2020 in Phuket, Thailand. The couple lived separately for the first year of their marriage before moving in together. The couple owned two dogs. Chad, who had appeared frequently on her YouTube channel, last appeared in a YouTube video with her in April 2022. She announced on 18 May 2023 that the two had gotten divorced. Saying they had met in their 20s, Wong said that they had grown into different people which prevented their marriage from bringing them joy. She said in the announcement video that for a period of time, she had received a diagnosis of moderate depression.

Wong lives at Villa Lucca (Chinese: 林海山城), a luxury residential development, in Ting Kok, Tai Po District, in the New Territories region of Hong Kong. She has four tattoos: the first says "pura vida", the second is an image of feathers and birds, the third says "determination", and the fourth says "mind over matter". Wong has a Hong Kong driving license.
