= Genesis Awards =

Animal welfare award

The Genesis Awards are awarded annually by the Humane Society of the United States (HSUS) to individuals in the major news and entertainment media for producing outstanding works, which raise public awareness of animal issues. Presented by the HSUS Hollywood Outreach program, the awards show takes place every March in California. The awards have honored such well-known personalities as Michael Jackson, Aaron Sorkin, Anderson Cooper, Peter Gabriel, Ellen DeGeneres, Jane Goodall, David E. Kelley, Paul McCartney, Arthur Miller, Stephen Colbert, Oprah Winfrey, Prince, Jacques Cousteau and Ian Somerhalder, as well as investigative journalists, including Bryan Christy and Robert Kovacik. Other award recipients include film and documentary writers and producers, as well as print and broadcast news outlets in the United States.

Honorary awards include the Sid Caesar Award for television comedy, the Doris Day Award for music, the Brigitte Bardot International Award for non-American media, and the Gretchen Wyler Award for a celebrity using their fame to bring attention to animal issues.

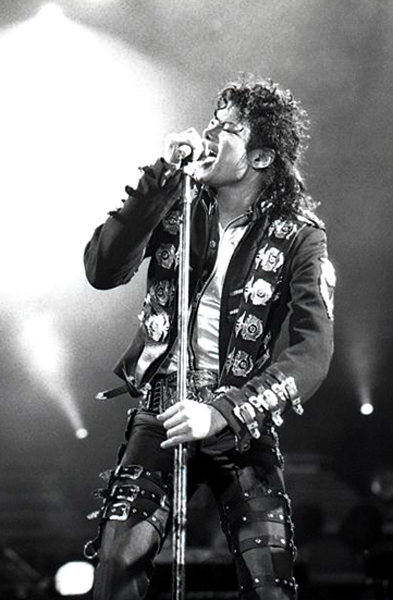
The Singer Michael Jackson won 2 Genesis Awards.

== Founding ==
The Genesis Awards were founded as an annual event in 1986 by the Broadway actress and animal advocate Gretchen Wyler, under the aegis of the Fund for Animals. Wyler believed that rewarding members of the media encouraged them to spotlight more animal issues, thus increasing public awareness and compassion toward animals. The first event, a luncheon, drew 140 attendees, and in subsequent years it grew into a large gala averaging 800 guests.

In 1991, Wyler founded the Ark Trust, Inc., to present the Genesis Awards. Dr. Michael A. Giannelli (Ph.D. in clinical psychology; UCLA) served as the Founding Executive Director from 1991 through 1997. In 1990, it became a television special airing first on the Discovery Channel and then on Animal Planet. In August 2002, the Ark Trust joined with the Humane Society of the United States (HSUS). Wyler, as Vice President of HSUS Hollywood, continued her role as chair of the event and Executive Producer of the Genesis Awards television special until her retirement in 2006.

== Winner selection ==
Beginning with the first ceremony in 1986, Genesis Awards entries have been submitted by members of the public as well as by media professionals. Categories span television, film, print, radio, music, and the arts. The Genesis Awards Committee—via a process of submission, nomination, candidate selection, debate, and secret ballot—makes the final decisions regarding the winners. The 13 committee members are selected based on their personal histories in working for animal causes. The members include people from various animal-protection organizations and diverse walks of life.

== Award ceremony ==
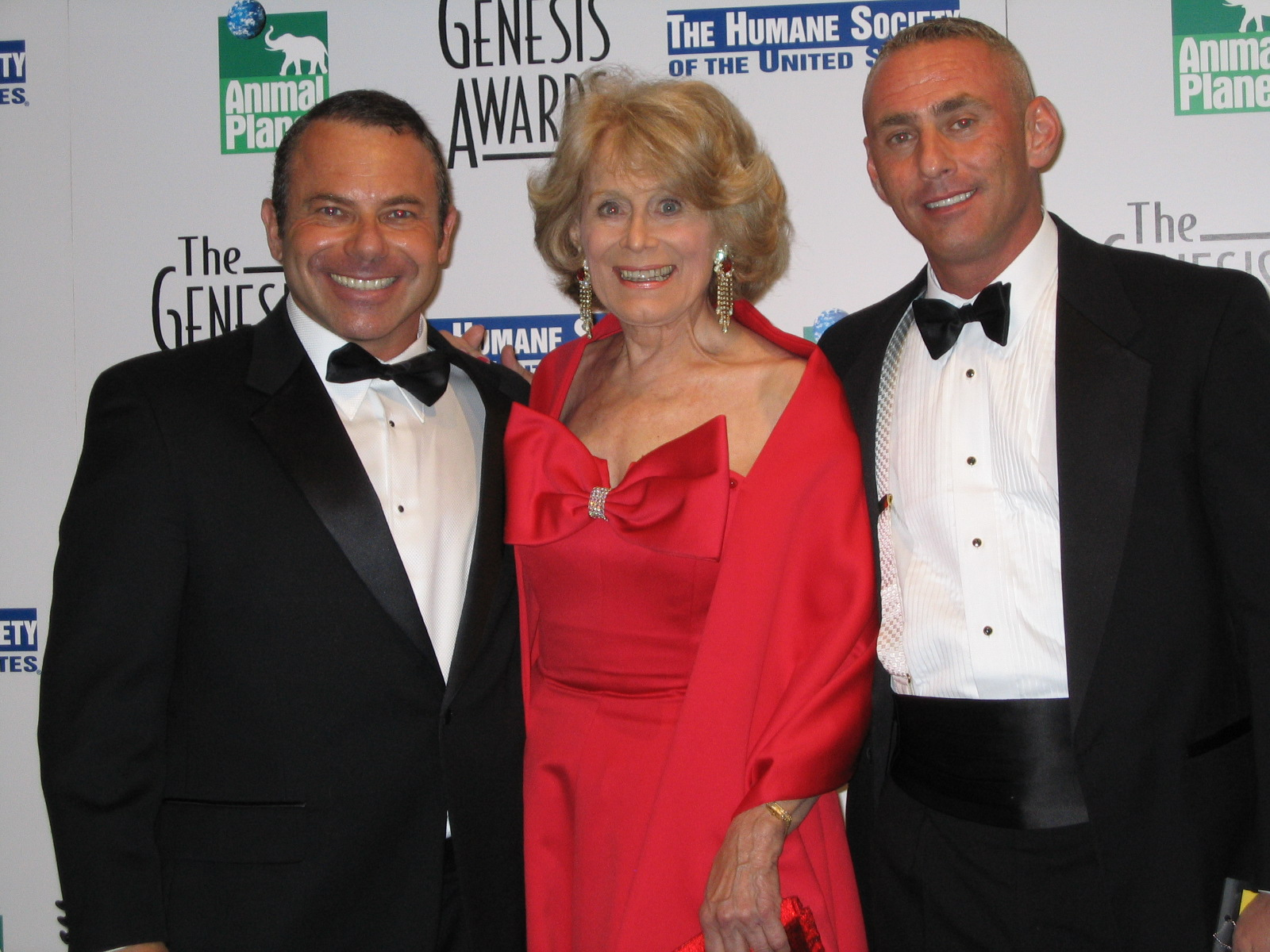
Gretchen Wyler, founder of the Genesis awards, with The HSUS supporters at the 20th Annual Genesis Awards at the Beverly Hilton in March 2006

The Genesis Awards honor the entertainment industry and news media for work related to animal-protection issues. The awards recognize works in television, film, print media and the arts that address animal welfare and related topics.

Past Genesis Awards hosts include Betty White, William Shatner, Brooke Shields, Ellen DeGeneres, Ed Asner, Wendie Malick, Bill Maher, Scott Hamilton, Kevin Nealon, Bonnie Hunt, Charlotte Ross, Joely Fisher, David Hyde Pierce and Carrie Ann Inaba.

The Genesis Awards have featured such celebrity presenters as James Stewart, Jack Lemmon, Milton Berle, Christian Bale, Sidney Poitier, Carl Reiner, Daryl Hannah, Kristen Bell, Pierce Brosnan, James Cromwell, Zooey Deschanel, Emily Deschanel, Melanie Griffith, Teri Hatcher, Isabella Rossellini, Martin Sheen, Kaley Cuoco, Nicollette Sheridan, Alicia Silverstone, Kelsey Grammer, Deepak Chopra, Kim Cattrall, Peter Falk, Walter Matthau, and Kermit the Frog. The Genesis Awards is taped for broadcast.

The awards ceremony has been held at both the Beverly Hilton Hotel in Beverly Hills and the Century Plaza Hotel in Century City. Through the years it has aired on the Discovery Channel, American Life Network and Animal Planet.

Sponsors for the Genesis Awards have included Warner Bros., Gardein, One Car One Difference, Honda, Bank of America, HBO, Market Development Group Incorporated and more.

== Past winners ==
Past Genesis Award Winners (1986-2005):

1986 Genesis Awards

- Magnum, P.I. – Best TV Drama Series
- Night Court – Best TV Comedy Series

1987 Genesis Awards

- Harry and the Hendersons – Best Feature Film – Comedy
- Star Trek IV: The Voyage Home – Best Feature Film – Adventure
- Benji the Hunted – Best Feature Film – Family
- Gimme a Break! – Best TV Comedy Series

1988 Genesis Awards

- Hachi-ko – Best Feature Film
- Highway to Heaven – Best TV Drama Series
- The Doris Day Music Award – Michael Jackson, "Man in the Mirror" (music video)
- Classic Film Award – Bambi
- Lifetime Achievement Award – Jacques Cousteau

1990 Genesis Awards

- Gorillas in the Mist – Best Feature Film
- The Bear – Best Foreign Film
- Life Goes On – Best TV Drama Series
- Punky Brewster – Best TV Comedy Series
- Classic Film Award – Born Free

1991 Genesis Awards

- The Rescuers Down Under – Best Feature Film
- MacGyver – Best TV Drama Series

1992 Genesis Awards

- City Slickers – Best Feature Film
- White Fang – Best Feature Film – Family
- Designing Women; "The Fur Flies" – Best TV Comedy Series
- Dinosaurs – Best Family TV Series

1993 Genesis Awards

- Beethoven – Best Feature Film
- FernGully: The Last Rainforest – Best Animated Feature Film
- The Simpsons; "Dog of Death" – Best TV Comedy Series
- Quantum Leap – Best TV Drama Series
- The New Lassie – Best Family TV Series
- The Doris Day Music Award – Megadeth, "Countdown to Extinction"
- Classic Film Award – The Misfits

1994 Genesis Awards

- Free Willy – Best Feature Film
- Sisters – Best TV Drama Series
- Roseanne; "Lanford Daze" – Best TV Comedy Series
- Rescue 911 – Best Reality Series
- The Doris Day Music Award – Paul McCartney, "Looking for Changes"
- Classic Film Award – Bless the Beasts and Children
- Lifetime Achievement Award – Jane Goodall

1995 Genesis Awards

- Black Beauty – Best Feature Film
- The Golden Palace – Best TV Comedy Series
- Dead at 21 – Best TV Drama Series

1996 Genesis Awards

- Babe – Best Feature Film
- The Simpsons; "Lisa the Vegetarian" – Best TV Comedy Series
- Dr. Quinn, Medicine Woman – Best TV Drama Series
- The Doris Day Music Award – Michael Jackson, "Earth Song"

1997 Genesis Awards

- Fly Away Home – Best Feature Film
- Ellen – Best TV Comedy Series
- Baywatch – Best TV Drama Series
- The Doris Day Music Award – Crosby & Nash, "To the Last Whale"
- A special Genesis Award was given to Dr. Michael A. Giannelli (Founding Executive Director, 1991–1997): "In Appreciation of Your Words, Your Wisdom and for Helping Develop the Soul of the Ark Trust"

1998 Genesis Awards

- Shiloh – Best Feature Film
- Everybody Loves Raymond – Best TV Comedy Series
- Millennium; "Broken World" – Best TV Drama Series

1999 Genesis Awards

- Mighty Joe Young – Best Feature Film
- The Practice; "The Food Chain" – Best TV Drama Series
- Sports Night – Best New TV Series
- Leeza – Best Talk Show
- Wild Rescues – Best Reality Series

2000 Genesis Awards

- Instinct – Best Feature Film
- The Iron Giant – Best Animated Feature Film
- Spin City; "The Deer Hunter" – Best TV Comedy Series
- Judging Amy; "The Persistence of Tectonics" – Best TV Drama Series
- Leeza – Best Talk Show
- Road Rules: Semester at Sea – Best Reality Series
- The Dolly Green Special Achievement Award – Prince, Rave Un2 the Joy Fantastic (liner notes)

2001 Genesis Awards

- Chicken Run – Best Feature Film
- Popular; "Joe Loves Mary Cherry" – Best TV Comedy Series
- Family Law; "Family Values" – Best TV Drama Series
- Politically Incorrect – Best Talk Show

2002 Genesis Awards

- Dr. Dolittle 2 – Best Feature Film
- Dharma & Greg; "A Fish Tale" – Best TV Comedy Series
- Law & Order; "Whose Monkey Is It Anyway" – Best TV Drama Series
- Wild Rescues – Best Reality Series
- The Doris Day Music Award – Claude Carmichael & Pete Wasner, "Bearly Hangin' On"

2003 Genesis Awards

- Spirit: Stallion of the Cimarron – Best Feature Film
- 8 Simple Rules; "Goodbye" – Best TV Comedy Series
- The Practice; "Small Sacrifices" and Everwood; "Deer God" (tie) – Best TV Drama Series
- Within These Walls – Best TV Movie
- Animal Precinct – Best Reality Series
- The Doris Day Music Award – Peter Gabriel, "Animal Nation"

2004 Genesis Awards Winners

- Legally Blonde 2: Red, White & Blonde – Best Feature Film
- Finding Nemo – Best Animated Feature Film
- Everybody Loves Raymond; "The Bird" – Best TV Comedy Series
- Animal Cops: Detroit – Best Reality Series
- The Classic Music Award – Matt Monro, "Born Free"

2005 Genesis Awards Winners

- Two Brothers – Best Feature Film
- Benji: Off the Leash! – Best Feature Film – Family
- The Corporation – Best Documentary Feature
- 8 Simple Rules; "Finale: Part Deux" – Sid Caesar Comedy Award (formerly called Best TV Comedy Series)
- Huff; "Is She Dead?" – Best TV Drama Series
- Cell Dogs – Best Reality Series
- The Montel Williams Show – Best Talk Show
- Best Friend Forgotten – Best TV Documentary

2006 Genesis Awards

- An Unfinished Life – Best Feature Film
- Duma – Best Feature Film – Family
- Wallace & Gromit: The Curse of the Were-Rabbit – Best Animated Feature Film
- The Wild Parrots of Telegraph Hill – Best Documentary Feature
- CSI: Crime Scene Investigation – Best TV Drama Series
- Larry King Live – Best Talk Show
- Animal Cops: Houston – Best Reality Series
- The Doris Day Music Award – Nellie McKay, "The Dog Song"

2007 Genesis Awards

- Fast Food Nation – Best Feature Film
- Charlotte's Web – Best Feature Film – Family
- Happy Feet – Best Animated Feature Film
- The Simpsons; "Million Dollar Abie" – Sid Caesar Comedy Award
- Bones; "The Woman in Limbo" – Best TV Drama Series
- Extreme Makeover: Home Edition; "The DeAlea Family" – Best Reality Series
- Avatar: The Last Airbender; "Appa's Lost Days" – Outstanding Children's Programming
- The Gretchen Wyler Award – Sir Paul McCartney

2008 Genesis Awards

- Year of the Dog – Best Feature Film
- According to Jim – Sid Caesar Comedy Award
- CSI: Crime Scene Investigation; "Unbearable" – Best TV Drama Series
- Planet in Peril – Best TV Documentary
- The Gretchen Wyler Award – Hayden Panettiere

2009 Genesis Awards

- Bolt – Best Feature Film
- Sharkwater – Best Documentary Feature
- The Simpsons; "Apocalypse Cow" – Sid Caesar Comedy Award
- Grey's Anatomy; "Life During Wartime" – Best TV Drama Series
- 30 Days; "Animal Rights" – Best Reality Seriesx
- Planet in Peril – Best TV Documentary
- The Gretchen Wyler Award – Ellen DeGeneres & Portia de Rossi

2010 Genesis Awards

- Hotel for Dogs and Up (tie) – Best Feature Film
- The Cove – Best Documentary Feature
- Family Guy; "Dog Gone" – Sid Caesar Comedy Award
- Bones; "The Tough Man in the Tender Chicken" – Best TV Drama Series
- The Ellen DeGeneres Show – Best Talk Show
- Whale Wars – Best Reality Series
- Death on a Factory Farm – Best TV Documentary
- Lifetime Achievement Award – Tippi Hedren

2011 Genesis Awards

- How to Train Your Dragon – Best Feature Film
- The Elephant in the Living Room – Best Documentary Feature
- The Colbert Report – Sid Caesar Comedy Award
- True Blood; "Hitting the Ground" – Best TV Drama Series
- The Oprah Winfrey Show – Best Talk Show
- Last Chance Highway – Best Reality Series
- My Child is a Monkey – Best TV Documentary
- The Gretchen Wyler Award – Kristin Davis

2012 Genesis Awards

- Rise of the Planet of the Apes – Best Feature Film
- Born to Be Wild 3D – Best Documentary Feature
- The Colbert Report – Sid Caesar Comedy Award
- Hawaii Five-0; "Lapa'au" – Best TV Drama Series
- The Ellen DeGeneres Show – Best Talk Show
- Animal Planet Investigates; "Captive Hunting Exposed" – Best Reality Series
- Gordon Ramsay: Shark Bait – Best TV Documentary
- 20/20 – Best TV Newsmagazine
- International Humanitarian Award – Pritish Nandy
- The Gretchen Wyler Award – Ian Somerhalder

2013 Genesis Awards

- Big Miracle – Best Feature Film
- The Colbert Report, Representative Steve King on dogfighting – Sid Caesar Comedy Award
- Harry's Law, "Gorilla My Dreams" – Best TV Drama Series
- Ivory Wars – Best TV Documentary
- Wild Justice – Reality Series
- 60 Minutes, "Jungle Warfare", Nine Network Australia – Brigitte Bardot International TV
- The Gretchen Wyler Award – Ke$ha

2014 Genesis Awards

- Free Birds - Best Feature Film
- Blackfish - Best Documentary Film
- American Dad: "Buck, Wild"; The Colbert Report: "Steve King on Chicken Cages", "The Word: Philanthropy"; The Daily Show: "Blowing the Whistle on Whistleblowers"; Saturday Night Live: "Veganville" - Sid Caesar Comedy Award
- Bubble Guppies: "Puppy Love" - Best Children's Programming
- An Apology to Elephants; Battle for the Elephants; Nature: "Parrot Confidential" - Best TV Documentary
- ABC News, "Turn Off That Camera! Animal Cruelty Exposés Being Blocked"; CNN, "Smugglers Drive Thailand's Grim Trade in Dog Meat"; NBC Nightly News with Brian Williams, "Making a Difference"; Univision News Network, "Primer Impacto: 'Butterball: Making History Against Abuse'"; "Primer Impacto: 'Puppy Mills: The Horror Story'" - Best National News
- Issues with Jane Velez Mitchell: "'Puppy Doe' beaten and left for dead"; Nightline: "Nightline Investigates: Going Undercover"; "The Exotic Pet Insurance Business" - Best News Magazine
- Today: Rossen Reports-"AKC-registered breeders raising dogs in 'miserable' conditions"; "Horses Are Wild-but Not Free" - Best Morning Show
- The Ellen DeGeneres Show - Best Talk Show
- America Declassified: "Missing Mustangs"; Inside: Secret America: "Animal Undercover" - Best Reality Series
- KGO-TV San Francisco, California, "Bay Area restaurants still selling banned foie gras"; KHOU 11 News Houston, Texas, "Houston man sets out to dispel pit bull myths"; KTNV ABC 13 Action News, "Deadly force against dogs: Are police officers going too far using deadly force against dogs?"; "Deadly force against dogs: When police kill pets"; "Action News viewers sound off on police killing pets" - Best Local News
- The Hollywood Reporter, "Animals Were Harmed" - Best Magazine
- Kansas City Star, "Animal abuse persists at some meat plants" - Best Newspaper Feature
- Rolling Stone, "In the Belly of the Beast" - Best Online Feature
- The New York Times, "Can We See Our Hypocrisy to Animals?"; The Washington Post, "Steve King's Inhumane Farm Bill Measure" - Best Columnist
- Bakersfield Californian; Cedar Rapids Gazette; Contra Costa Times; Des Moines Register; Los Angeles Daily News; Los Angeles Times; The New York Times; San Jose Mercury News; Santa Rosa Press Democrat; Tulsa World; USA Today; Ventura County Star; The Washington Post - Special Recognition

2018 Genesis Awards

- Okja; Megan Leavey - Outstanding Feature Film
- Sled Dogs; The Last Pig - Outstanding Documentary Film
- The Simpsons - Sid Caesar Comedy Award
- ABC News Hotline, "Giraffes: A Silent Extinction"; "Blood Horns" - Outstanding National TV News Magazine
- Univision Network News, "Harvey, the Dog Who Survived the Hurricane" - Outstanding National TV News Feature
- FOX 28/ABC6, Columbus, Ohio, "12 Ohio Puppy Mills on Humane Society's List of the 'Horrible Hundred'" - Outstanding Local News Feature
- FOX 31 KDVR-TV Denver, Colorado, "Cyanide Bombs"; "Unsanctioned Horse Racing Exposed"; KING 5 News Seattle, Washington, "Hound Hunting for Bears Continues Despite Ban" - Outstanding Local News Series
- FOX 40 Sacramento, Studio 40 Live, "Meat-less Memorial Day" - Outstanding Daytime Show
- Mission Critical: Orangutan on the Edge; War Dog: A Soldier's Best Friend - Outstanding TV Documentary
- Dian Fossey: Secrets in the Mist - Outstanding TV Documentary Series
- The Loud House "Frog Wild" - Outstanding Children's Programming
- NPR Weekend Edition, Simon Says, "Arcade Hunting: No Tribute to the Great Outdoors" - Outstanding Radio
- Natasha Daly - Reporter of the Year
- TIME, "The Future of Zoos: Challenges Force Zoos to Change in Big Ways"; TIME Special Edition, "The Animal Mind: How They Think, How They Feel, How to Understand Them" - Outstanding Magazine Feature
- Chicago Tribune, "Trump Should Keep the Ban on Elephant Trophies"; "A Smart Reprieve for Great Lakes Wolves"; "Memo to the West: When You Hunt Grizzlies and Wolves, You Lose Midwest Tourists"; Los Angeles Times, "There's a Grim Reality Behind Your Thanksgiving Turkey"; USA Today, "A Christmas Puppy: The Tale of Animal Welfare" - Outstanding Editorial
- The Washington Post Sports Columnist: Norman Chad "Animal Cruelty has given me a change of heart on animals used in sporting competition" - Outstanding Commentary
- Business of Fashion, Multiple Articles; National Geographic Wildlife Watch, "Months After Raid on Infamous Tiger Temple, Plans for Off-Shoot Zoo Forge Ahead" - Outstanding Online
- The Guardian, Exclusive Footage Shows Elephants Being Captured in Zimbabwe for Chinese Zoos; The Observer, Africa's New Elite Force: Women Gunning for Poachers and Fighting for a Better Life - Brigitte Bardot International Print/Online
- Univision Network Facebook "To Eat or Not Eat Meat?" - Social Media

== See also ==
- List of American television awards
