= Senator Hill =

Senator Hill may refer to:

== United States Senate members ==
- Benjamin Harvey Hill (1823–1882), U.S. Senator from Georgia from 1877 to 1882
- David B. Hill (1843–1910), U.S. Senator from New York from 1892 to 1897
- Isaac Hill (1789–1851), U.S. Senator from New Hampshire from 1831 to 1836
- J. Lister Hill (1894–1984), U.S. Senator from Alabama from 1938 to 1969
- Joshua Hill (politician) (1812–1891), U.S. Senator from Georgia from 1871 to 1873
- Nathaniel P. Hill (1832–1900), U.S. Senator from Colorado from 1879 to 1885
- William Luther Hill (1873–1951), U.S. Senator from Florida in 1936

== United States state senate members ==
- Albert E. Hill (1870–1933), Tennessee State Senate
- Andy Hill (politician) (1962–2016), Washington State Senate
- Angela Burks Hill (born 1965), Mississippi State Senate
- Brent Hill (politician) (born 1949), Idaho State Senate
- Dawn Hill (born 1969), Maine State Senate
- Ebenezer J. Hill (1845–1917), Connecticut State Senate
- Frank Hill (born 1954), California State Senate
- Henry W. Hill (1853–1929), New York State Senate
- Hunter Hill (politician) (born 1977), Georgia State Senate
- James Hill (Wisconsin state legislator) (1825–1897), Wisconsin State Senate
- Jerry Hill (politician) (born 1947), California State Senate
- Jim Hill (Oregon politician) (born 1947), Oregon State Senate
- John Fremont Hill (1855–1912), Maine State Senate
- John Sprunt Hill (1869–1961), North Carolina State Senate
- John Hill (New Jersey politician) (1821–1884), New Jersey State Senate
- John Hill (North Carolina politician) (1797–1861), North Carolina State Senate
- Judson Hill (born 1959), Georgia State Senate
- Louis G. Hill (1924–2013), Pennsylvania State Senate
- Mark Langdon Hill (1772–1842), Massachusetts State Senate
- Owen Hill (born 1982), Colorado State Senate
- Ralph W. Hill (1893–1958), Nebraska State Senate
- Rees Hill (1776–1852), Pennsylvania State Senate
- Tony Hill (politician) (born 1957), Florida State Senate
- William Henry Hill (New York politician) (1876–1972), New York State Senate
- William Henry Hill (North Carolina politician) (1767–1809), North Carolina State Senate
