= Senator Conklin =

Senator Conklin may refer to:

- J. E. Conklin (1889–1965), Nebraska State Senate
- James Conklin (politician) (1831–1899), Wisconsin State Senate
- Jonathan S. Conklin (1770–1839), New York State Senate
- William T. Conklin (1908–1990), New York State Senate
