= Bertha I. Hill =

American politician (1892–1980)

28th Nebraska State Treasurer
- In office July 17, 1958 – January 8, 1959
- Preceded by: Ralph W. Hill
- Succeeded by: Richard Larsen

Personal details
- Born: 1893 or 1894 Oberlin, Kansas
- Died: December 18, 1980 (aged 86) Lincoln, Nebraska
- Party: Republican
- Spouse: Ralph W. Hill (m. 1916; died 1958)
- Education: University of Kansas

Bertha I. Hill (1892 or 1893 – December 18, 1980) was a Republican politician from Nebraska who served as the 28th Nebraska State Treasurer from July 1958 to January 1959, completing the term of her late husband, Ralph W. Hill.

Hill was born in Oberlin, Kansas, and married Ralph W. Hill in 1916. They moved to Hebron, Nebraska, in 1927. He served in the Nebraska Legislature from 1949 to 1955, and was elected State Treasurer in 1954 and 1956.

In 1944, Governor Dwight Griswold appointed Hill to the Board of Education of State Normal Schools, and reappointed her in 1945 for a full six-year term. She was named the president of the board from 1949 to 1951.

On July 13, 1958, Hill's husband died in office. Governor Victor Anderson appointed her to serve out the remaining months of his term, and she was sworn in on July 17, 1958. Upon her appointment, Hill became the first woman to hold an elected statewide office in state history. Hill did not run for a full term, and remained active in the Nebraska Republican Party. She died on December 18, 1980.
