= Frank S. Wells =

American politician (1865–1958)

Member of the Nebraska Legislature from the 22nd district
- In office January 5, 1937 – January 3, 1939
- Preceded by: Position created
- Succeeded by: J. Lyndon Thornton

Member of the Nebraska State Senate from the 17th district
- In office January 1, 1935 – January 5, 1937
- Preceded by: James A. Brunt
- Succeeded by: Position abolished

Member of the Nebraska House of Representatives from the 39th district
- In office January 2, 1923 – January 1, 1935
- Preceded by: R. G. Douglas
- Succeeded by: Albert C. Schoenrock

Personal details
- Born: January 7, 1865 Leipsic, Ohio
- Died: November 28, 1958 (aged 93) Fairbury, Nebraska
- Party: Democratic
- Spouse: Estella May Beach (m. 1886; died 1943)
- Children: 7
- Occupation: Farmer

Franklin Stewart Wells (January 7, 1865 – November 28, 1958) was a Democratic politician from Nebraska who served as a member of the Nebraska House of Representatives from 1923 to 1935, in the Nebraska State Senate from 1935 to 1937, and as a member of the Nebraska Legislature from the 22nd district from 1937 to 1939.

== Early life ==
Wells was born in Leipsic, Ohio, in 1865, and moved to Nebraska in 1879. He was a farmer and served on the local school board. In 1920, he was the Democratic nominee for the Nebraska State Senate from the 15th district, losing to incumbent State Senator Clement Harriss.

== Nebraska House of Representatives ==
In 1922, Wells was elected to the Nebraska House of Representatives from the 39th district. He was re-elected in 1924, 1926, 1928, 1930, and 1932.

== Nebraska State Senate ==
When Republican State Senator James A. Brunt opted to run for the Nebraska Supreme Court from the 4th district rather than seek re-election, Wells ran to succeed him in the 17th district in 1934. He won the Democratic primary unopposed, and defeated Republican R. J. Liliedoll in the general election with 54 percent of the vote.

== Nebraska Legislature ==
In 1936, as the State Senate and House were consolidated into the unicameral legislature, Wells ran in the newly created 22nd district. In the nonpartisan primary, he faced State Representative E. Preston Bailey, real estate operator Jacob Bartel, druggist George Medsker, and locomotive engineer George Wylie. Wells and Bailey advanced to the general election, which Wells narrowly won, defeating Bailey with 53 percent of the vote.

Wells ran for re-election in 1938, and was challenged by former Fairbury City Councilman and postmaster J. Lyndon Thornton, C. K. Nispel, and George Wylie. In the primary, Wells placed first, winning 35 percent of the vote to Thornton's 29 percent, but lost the general election by a wide margin, receiving 41 percent of the vote to Thornton's 59 percent.

In 1940, Wells challenged Thornton for re-election, but lost, 57–43 percent. He ran again in 1942, and placed third in the primary with 24 percent of the vote, losing to Thornton and banker J. E. Conklin.

== Personal life ==
Wells married Estella May Beach in 1886, and had seven children with her. She died in 1943.

== Death ==
Wells died on November 28, 1958.
