= Appa's Lost Days =

- Avatar: The Last Airbender episode
- Appa is forced to perform for a circus.
- Episode no.: Season 2 Episode 16
- Directed by: Giancarlo Volpe
- Written by: Elizabeth Welch
- Production code: 216
- Original air date: October 13, 2006

Guest appearances
- Brian George as Guru Pathik; Dwight Schultz as trainer; Paul McKinney as Ghashiun; Robin Atkin Downes as circus master

Episode chronology
← Previous "The Tales of Ba Sing Se"	Next → "Lake Laogai"
- Avatar: The Last Airbender season 2

"Appa's Lost Days" is the sixteenth episode of the second season of the American animated television series Avatar: The Last Airbender, and the 36th episode overall. The show follows Aang (Zach Tyler Eisen), the last airbender and the “Avatar”, on his journey to bring balance to a war-torn world by mastering all four elements: air, water, earth, and fire. On his quest, he is joined by companions Katara (Mae Whitman), Sokka (Jack DeSena), and Toph Beifong (Jessie Flower), and hunted down by Fire Nation prince Zuko (Dante Basco) and princess Azula (Grey DeLisle).

The episode, written by Elizabeth Welch and directed by Giancarlo Volpe, follows Appa (Dee Bradley Baker) struggling to reunite with Aang after he was kidnapped in the episode "The Library". Along the way, he encounters Kyoshi Warrior Suki (Jennie Kwan) and Guru Pathik (Brian George). Meanwhile, the episode also showcases the first time Appa met Aang through flashbacks. The episode released on Nickelodeon on October 13, 2006, and received positive reviews for its depiction of cruelty to animals.

== Plot ==
Following Appa's capture, (Note: As depicted in "The Library".) he escapes the sandbenders, accidentally burying one of their sleds in the process, (Note: This sled was later found by Aang and his friends in "The Desert".) but is then tranquilized and sold to a circus. (Note: This is the same circus Ty Lee was a part of in "Return to Omashu".) The animal tamer threatens Appa with fire, claiming he will break him. A young boy moves hay closer to Appa so he can eat, reminding him of Aang. That night, Appa is introduced as "The Wind Buffalo" and forced to fly through burning rings. Appa notices the young boy telling him to escape, so he strikes the animal tamer to the ground and flees the circus.

Appa returns to the desert but finds the library buried and Aang nowhere to be found. Appa goes to the buzzard wasp nest (Note: The nest Aang and his friends also went to in "The Desert") and is forced to fight them, collapsing in the sand when he loses. Appa stumbles into a barn for hay and water. As he sleeps, Appa dreams of his first time meeting Aang at the Eastern Air Temple; Aang gives the baby Appa an apple and says that they will be forever together.

Appa is awakened by farmers who threaten him with a torch. Scared of the fire, Appa flies away. Appa flies over the Serpent's Pass, seen by Iroh as he and Zuko sleep on the ferry. (Note: This would have taken place in the episode "The Secret of the Fire Nation") Appa lands in a forest and is forced to fight a boar-q-pine (combination of the wild boar and the porcupine) and pricked with quills. Appa wins the fight and claims the territory. The next day, Suki, who heard about Appa's kidnapping, (Note: Suki was told by Katara in "The Secret of the Fire Nation") assembles the Kyoshi Warriors to help him. She lures him out by using apples, reminding Appa of Aang. The Kyoshi Warriors restore him to health. Azula, Mai, and Ty Lee attack, calling them "the Avatar's fan girls". Appa flies away, scared by the fire that Azula is producing. Seeing Suki in danger, Appa rushes to rescue her, but she scares him away with fire, urging Appa to find Aang.

Appa flies over Southern Water Tribe ships that carry Sokka and Katara's father, Hakoda, landing at the now abandoned Eastern Air Temple. Appa meets Pathik, a guru that wishes to help the Avatar. Pathik asks Appa to deliver a message to Aang. He attaches a letter to Appa's horn and tells him to find Aang in Ba Sing Se. As Appa enters the city, he hears a bison whistle. Believing it to be Aang, Appa lands, only for Long Feng to capture Appa, leaving only a single footprint in the mud. (Note: The pygmy pumas would later lead Momo to this footprint in "The Tales of Ba Sing Se")

== Credits ==
Main cast members Zach Tyler Eisen, Dante Basco, and Dee Bradley Baker star as Aang, Zuko, and Appa respectively, with archive recordings of Jessie Flower as Toph Beifong being used for the episode's opening. The episode marks the second time in the series that Mae Whitman and Jack DeSena do not voice Katara and Sokka respectively, after the episode "Zuko Alone." Appearing as guests are Mako as Zuko's uncle Iroh, Jennie Kwan as Kyoshi Warrior leader Suki, Grey DeLisle as Fire Nation Princess Azula, Cricket Leigh as Azula's knife-throwing friend Mai, Olivia Hack as Azula's acrobatic friend Ty Lee, Brian George as the Guru Pathik, Dwight Schultz as the circus trainer, and Paul McKinney as sandbender Ghashiun.

The episode was directed by Giancarlo Volpe and written by Elizabeth Welch.

The animation for the episode was done by JM Animation.

== Reception ==
The episode received positive reviews for its depiction of cruelty to animals.

Max Nicholson of IGN gave the episode a rating of 8 out of 10, praising the "spotlight placed squarely on Appa for an episode, as the forlorn sky bison went in search of his Avatar companion." Hayden Childs of The A.V. Club called the episode "a tough watch for the casual cruelty that Appa experiences, but it is a necessary component of the show. Appa’s absence has been looming over the show for several episodes now, and this episode shows that the Aang Gang has been looking in entirely the wrong place."

In 2020, The Harvard Crimson ranked the episode as the 31st best episode of the series.

In 2007, the episode received a Genesis Award from the Humane Society of the United States in the category "Outstanding Children's Programming," noting it for it being "a mythical tale about animals held captive for human entertainment that resonates with the way animals are used in circuses today."
