= J. E. Conklin =

American politician (1889–1965)

Member of the Nebraska Legislature from the 22nd district
- In office January 5, 1943 – January 7, 1947
- Preceded by: J. Lyndon Thornton
- Succeeded by: R. B. Steele

Personal details
- Born: November 23, 1889 Hubbell, Nebraska
- Died: July 31, 1965 (aged 75) Lincoln, Nebraska
- Party: Democratic
- Spouse: Wilhelmina Barrett (m. 1911)
- Children: 2
- Occupation: Banker, farmer

J. E. Conklin (November 23, 1889 – July 31, 1965) was a Democratic politician from Nebraska who served as a member of the Nebraska Legislature from the 22nd district from 1943 to 1947.

== Early life ==
Conklin was born in Hubbell, Nebraska, in 1889. He grew up in Hubbell, attending public schools there and Phillips Exeter Academy in Exeter, New Hampshire. Conklin served in the military during World War I, and was a banker, serving as president of the Hubbell State Bank in 1924 after the death of his father. As a farmer, he pioneered soil conservation efforts in Thayer County. Conklin was active in the Nebraska Democratic Party, serving as a member of the state party's central committee.

== Nebraska Legislature ==
In 1942, Conklin ran for the Nebraska Legislature from the 22nd district, challenging State Senator J. Lyndon Thornton for re-election. Thornton placed first in the primary, winning 27 percent of the vote, while Conklin narrowly placed second, receiving just 3 fewer votes than Thornton, and former State Senator Frank S. Wells placed third with 24 percent. In the general election, Conklin defeated Thornton, winning 52 percent of the vote to Thornton's 48 percent.

Conklin ran for re-election in 1944, and was challenged by Bryan Lamb, a high school teacher and member of the Norris Public Power District Board of Directors. Conklin placed first in the primary by a wide margin, receiving 67 percent of the vote to Lamb's 33 percent. Conklin defeated Lamb in a landslide in the general election, winning his second term, 71–29 percent.

In 1946, Conklin sought a third term, and was challenged by R. B. Steele, a businessman and the son of Calvin F. Steele, the former President Pro Tempore of the Nebraska State Senate, and Army Air Force veteran Dick Karabatsos. Conklin won 44 percent of the vote in the primary election, and advanced to the general election with Steele, who placed second with 36 percent. In the general election, Steele defeated Conklin with 57 percent of the vote.

== Post-legislative career ==
Conklin sought to return to the legislature in 1952, with the expectation that Ralph W. Hill, who defeated Steele in 1948, would not seek a third term so that Conklin could run again. However, the "understanding" between Conklin and Hill ended; Hill ran for a third term, and Conklin challenged him. Hill placed first in the primary election, receiving 53 percent of the vote to Conklin's 47 percent, and defeated Conklin by a wider margin in the general election, winning 59 percent of the vote.

== Death and legacy ==
Conklin died on July 31, 1965. Following his death, a dam in the Bowman-Springs Branch Watershed Conservancy District was named for him in recognition of his soil conservation advocacy.
