= Lucas Hoge =

American singer-songwriter and musician

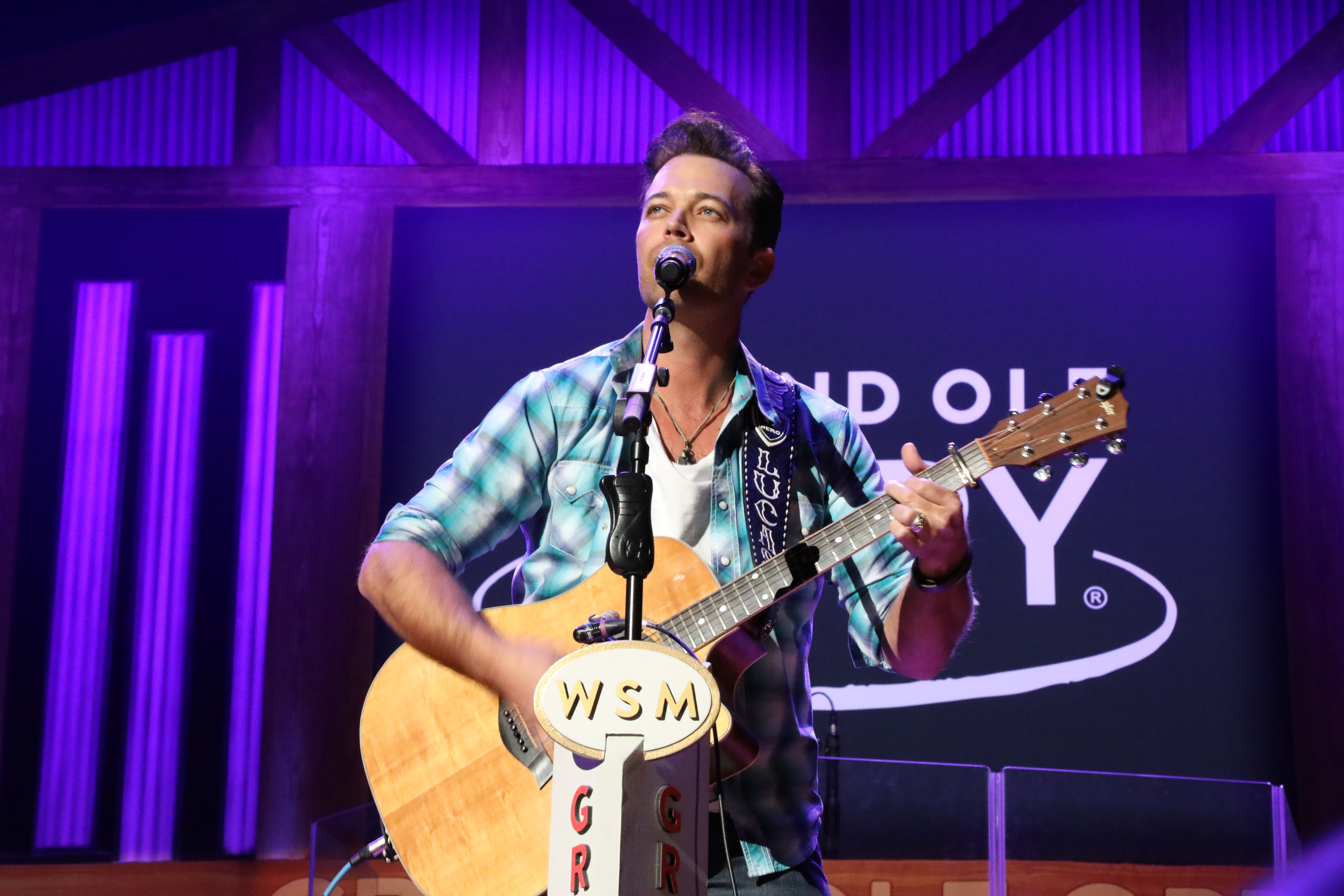

Background information
- Born: Lucas Jerrod Hoge
- Origin: Hubbell, Nebraska, United States
- Genres: Country, country rock
- Occupations: Singer-songwriter; musician
- Instruments: Vocals; guitar; drums
- Website: www.lucashoge.com

Lucas Jerrod Hoge is an American singer-songwriter and musician. He is also the host of "Hoge Wild" on Sportsman Channel.

== Early life ==
Lucas Hoge grew up in Hubbell, Nebraska, along with three siblings . At the age of 17, he started to play the guitar. Hoge attended the University of Nebraska–Lincoln in Lincoln.

== Music & TV career ==
He was the lead artist for two bands; the rock band "Southern Cross" and "Xtreme Devotion", a Christian music group. Local residents of the small town raised $2,500 to help launch his career. Hoge moved to an apartment in Nashville and started work, performing in small clubs in the evenings.

His first CD, entitled "In My Dreams", was released in 2002. In the same year, Hoge's first song for television was "If I Only Could" and featured on the hit Warner Brothers show Smallville. Hoge released his second album, "Dirt", in 2006.

Hoge went on to appear on television programs including a 2007 Toby Keith Christmas production, a Sunday Night Football promotion with Faith Hill.

Hoge has toured London and traveled to the Middle East to perform for American troops. He's visited bases in Iraq, Kuwait, Kosovo, Afghanistan, Africa, Alaska as well as other locations over the last 9 years on the Armed Forces Entertainment Wrangler National Patriot Tour. Hoge is the official spokesperson for Guardian Angels for a Soldiers Pet.

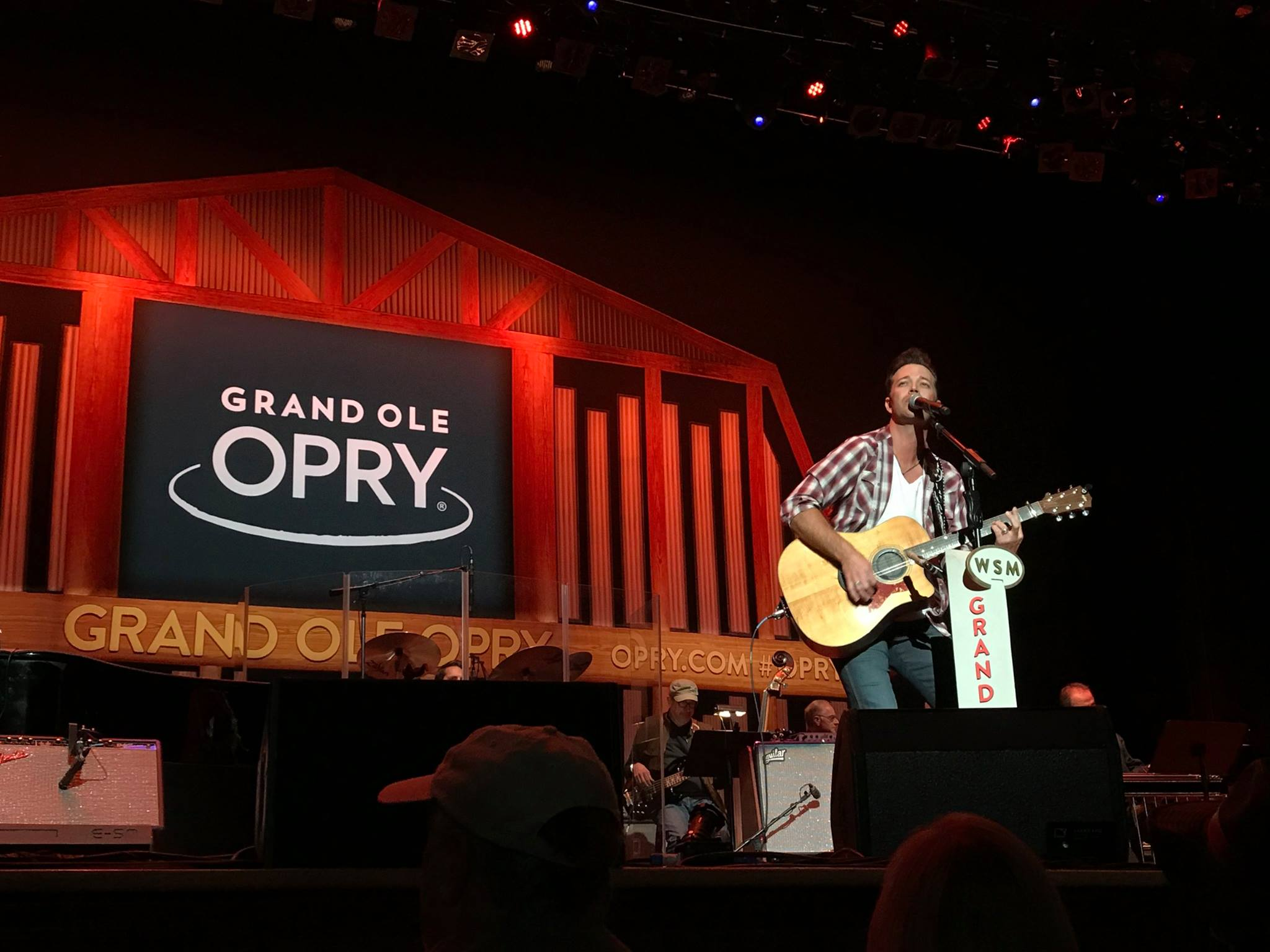
Lucas Hoge live at the Opry

Hoge was the host and star of Animal Planet's TV show "Last Chance Highway" and wrote and performed the show's theme song. In 2011 he made his debut performance at the Ryman.

Hoge received his first nomination in the Inspirational Country Music Awards (ICM) as "New Artist of The Year" 2011. Hoge gained recognition in the Christian Country genre when he answered a woman's dying wish, Natalie Fognani, and wrote the song "How Was I To Know", inspired by her poem. Around the same time, Hoge played several concerts in Colorado, where Natalie lives, including opening for Martina McBride.

Hoge landed his second TV show theme song with "Give A Damn".

Lucas Hoge partners with Southwest Airlines as the Southwest Storyteller Ambassador

Lucas Hoge is the creator, producer and star of "Hoge Wild" airing on Sportsman Channel. The show follows Lucas hunting, fishing, scuba diving and performing across the globe.

=== 2017: Dirty South ===
In April 2017, he released the title track "Dirty South" of as the lead single from the album. The album Dirty South was released on July 28, 2017, and debuted at No. 12 on Billboard's Top Country Albums with 7,000 copies sold. It is Hoge's first appearance on a Billboard chart. The following week it reached No. 5 on the chart and was the best-selling country album of the week with 9,900 copies sold.

Rolling Stone named Lucas Hoge TOP 10 artists You Need To Know 2017.

NRA Country names Lucas Hoge NRA Country artist for July 2017.

== Personal life ==
Hoge is married to Laura Lynn Hoge and lives in Nashville.

== Albums ==
Title	Album details	Peak chart positions		Sales
Title	Album details	US	US Country	Sales
Dirty South	Released: July 28, 2017; Label: Rebel Engine Entertainment; Format: CD, download digital	51	5	US: 31,500

== Awards ==
- 2006 – Country Album of the Year – Los Angeles Music Awards
- 2006 – Christian Contemporary Singer/Songwriter of the Year – Los Angeles Music Awards
- 2011 – ICM's New Artist Of The Year – Nomination

== Music videos ==
Year	Title	Director
2014	"Flip Flops"	Brett Bortle
2016	"Boom Boom"	Stokes Nielson
2017	"Dirty South"	Jeff Johnson
2018	"Power of Garth"	Jeff Johnson
