= R. B. Steele =

American politician (1879/1880–1966)

Member of the Nebraska Legislature from the 22nd district
- In office January 7, 1947 – January 4, 1949
- Preceded by: J. E. Conklin
- Succeeded by: Ralph W. Hill

Personal details
- Born: 1879 or 1880
- Died: October 21, 1966 (aged 86) Beatrice, Nebraska
- Party: Republican
- Children: 5
- Relatives: Calvin F. Steele (father)
- Education: University of Nebraska College of Law
- Occupation: Sand and gravel contractor, mortician

Roy B. Steele (1879 or 1880 – October 21, 1966) was a Republican politician from Nebraska who served as a member of the Nebraska Legislature from the 22nd district from 1947 to 1949.

== Early life ==
Steele was born to Calvin F. Steele, who served in the Nebraska State Senate from 1897 to 1903, and as acting Lieutenant Governor from 1901 to 1903. He graduated from the University of Nebraska College of Law in 1902, and worked as a licensed mortician for several years before opening a sand and gravel manufacturing business. Steele was active in the Nebraska Republican Party, serving as the chairman of the Jefferson County Republican Party and as a delegate to the 1920 Republican National Convention from the 4th congressional district.

== Nebraska Legislature ==
In 1946, Steele ran for the Nebraska Legislature from the 22nd district, challenging incumbent State Senator J. E. Conklin. Conklin placed first in the primary election, receiving 44 percent of the vote to Steele's 36 percent, and they advanced to the general election. Steele ultimately defeated Conklin with 57 percent of the vote.

Steele ran for re-election in 1948, and was challenged by businessman Ralph W. Hill and attorney George P. Burger. Steele received 42 percent of the vote in the primary to Hill's 37 percent and Burger's 21 percent, and Hill defeated Steele in the general election with 54 percent of the vote.

In 1960, Steele ran for the legislature again, challenging State Senator Arnold Ruhnke for re-election. Steele placed a distant second in the primary election, receiving 26 percent of the vote to Ruhnke's 74 percent, and lost the general election by a similar margin, 75–25 percent.

== Death ==
Steele died on October 21, 1966.
