= Hubbell, Nebraska =

Village in Thayer County, Nebraska, United States

- Village
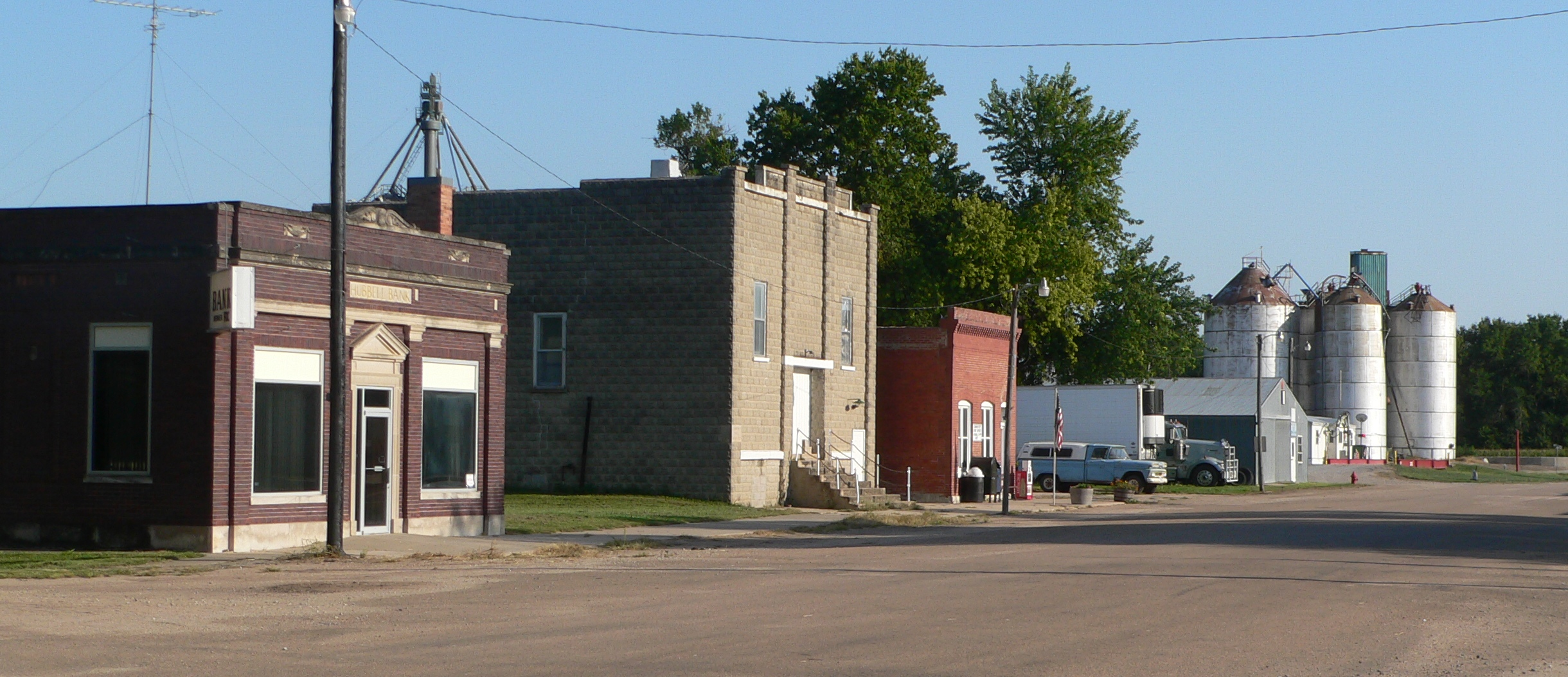
- Downtown Hubbell, August 2011

- Location of Hubbell, Nebraska
- Coordinates: 40°00′32″N 97°29′49″W
- Country: United States
- State: Nebraska
- County: Thayer

Area
  - Total: 0.31 sq mi (0.81 km^{2})
  - Land: 0.31 sq mi (0.81 km^{2})
  - Water: 0 sq mi (0.00 km^{2})
- Elevation: 1,460 ft (450 m)

Population (2020)
  - Total: 63
  - Estimate (2021): 61
  - Density: 200/sq mi (78/km^{2})
- Time zone: UTC-6 (Central (CST))
  - Summer (DST): UTC-5 (CDT)
- ZIP code: 68375
- Area code: 402
- FIPS code: 31-23410
- GNIS feature ID: 2398554

Hubbell is a village in Thayer County, Nebraska, United States. The population was 63 at the 2020 census.

== History ==
Hubbell was platted in 1880 when the railroad was extended to that point. It was named for Hubbell H. Johnson, the original owner of the town site.

== Geography ==
According to the United States Census Bureau, the village has a total area of 0.34 square miles (0.88 km^{2}), all land.

=== Climate ===
Climate data for Hubbell, Nebraska (1991-2022)
Month	Jan	Feb	Mar	Apr	May	Jun	Jul	Aug	Sep	Oct	Nov	Dec	Year
Average precipitation inches (mm)	0.68 (17)	0.79 (20)	1.68 (43)	2.50 (64)	4.52 (115)	4.26 (108)	4.31 (109)	3.55 (90)	3.17 (81)	2.21 (56)	1.25 (32)	0.92 (23)	29.84 (758)
Average snowfall inches (cm)	6.7 (17)	6.9 (18)	3.3 (8.4)	0.8 (2.0)	trace	0.0 (0.0)	0.0 (0.0)	0.0 (0.0)	trace	0.6 (1.5)	2.4 (6.1)	4.6 (12)	25.3 (65)
Average extreme snow depth inches (cm)	5 (13)	4 (10)	3 (7.6)	0 (0)	0 (0)	0 (0)	0 (0)	0 (0)	0 (0)	1 (2.5)	1 (2.5)	3 (7.6)	5 (13)
Average precipitation days (≥ 0.01 Inches)	4	4	6	7	10	7	7	7	6	5	4	3	70
Average snowy days (≥ 0.1 Inches)	3	2	1	0	0	0	0	0	0	0	1	2	9
Source: NOAA (National Weather Service)

== Demographics ==
Historical population
Census	Pop.	Note	%±
1890	330		—
1900	375		13.6%
1910	295		−21.3%
1920	231		−21.7%
1930	233		0.9%
1940	250		7.3%
1950	199		−20.4%
1960	126		−36.7%
1970	83		−34.1%
1980	71		−14.5%
1990	55		−22.5%
2000	73		32.7%
2010	68		−6.8%
2020	63		−7.4%
2021 (est.)	61	▼	−3.2%
U.S. Decennial Census

=== 2010 census ===
As of the census of 2010, there were 68 people, 31 households, and 19 families residing in the village. The population density was 200.0 inhabitants per square mile (77.2/km^{2}). There were 44 housing units at an average density of 129.4 per square mile (50.0/km^{2}). The racial makeup of the village was 100.0% White. Hispanic or Latino of any race were 1.5% of the population.

There were 31 households, of which 19.4% had children under the age of 18 living with them, 61.3% were married couples living together, and 38.7% were non-families. 35.5% of all households were made up of individuals, and 25.8% had someone living alone who was 65 years of age or older. The average household size was 2.19 and the average family size was 2.84.

The median age in the village was 51 years. 20.6% of residents were under the age of 18; 2.9% were between the ages of 18 and 24; 13.3% were from 25 to 44; 44.1% were from 45 to 64; and 19.1% were 65 years of age or older. The gender makeup of the village was 55.9% male and 44.1% female.

=== 2000 census ===
As of the census of 2000, there were 73 people, 29 households, and 20 families residing in the village. The population density was 230.0 inhabitants per square mile (88.8/km^{2}). There were 43 housing units at an average density of 135.5 per square mile (52.3/km^{2}). The racial makeup of the village was 98.63% White and 1.37% African American. Hispanic or Latino of any race were 2.74% of the population.

There were 29 households, out of which 27.6% had children under the age of 18 living with them, 69.0% were married couples living together, 3.4% had a female householder with no husband present, and 27.6% were non-families. 20.7% of all households were made up of individuals, and 10.3% had someone living alone who was 65 years of age or older. The average household size was 2.52 and the average family size was 2.90.

In the village, the population was spread out, with 27.4% under the age of 18, 2.7% from 18 to 24, 26.0% from 25 to 44, 28.8% from 45 to 64, and 15.1% who were 65 years of age or older. The median age was 42 years. For every 100 females, there were 97.3 males. For every 100 females age 18 and over, there were 89.3 males.

As of 2000 the median income for a household in the village was $37,500, and the median income for a family was $38,125. Males had a median income of $24,375 versus $14,250 for females. The per capita income for the village was $14,630. There were 8.8% of families and 20.6% of the population living below the poverty line, including 45.2% of under eighteens and 14.3% of those over 64.

== Notable people ==
- J. E. Conklin, member of the Nebraska Legislature and president of the Hubbell State Bank
- Lucas Hoge, American singer-songwriter

== See also ==
- List of municipalities in Nebraska
