= Best Friend Forgotten =

- Directed by: Julie Lofton
- Written by: Julie Lofton
- Produced by: Julie Lofton
- Starring: David Duchovny; Clover, the Dog; Oreo, the Cat
- Narrated by: David Duchovny
- Cinematography: Stephen Lighthill; Keith Walker; J.B Letchinger
- Edited by: Jan Sutcliff
- Music by: Matt Mariano
- Distributed by: PBS
- Release date: December 15, 2004
- Running time: 100 minutes
- Country: United States
- Language: English

Best Friend Forgotten is a 2004 American documentary film about pet overpopulation. The documentary, hosted by David Duchovny (Californication, X-files), tells the stories of Oreo the cat and Clover the dog as they face the realities of pet overpopulation. Viewers are given a balanced look at the controversial practice of euthanasia and the alternative no-kill movement. Interviews discuss common myths about spaying and neutering, and leaders from government to animal rights groups discuss pet overpopulation and the impact on our society.

== Creators ==
The documentary was written, directed, and produced by filmmaker Julie Lofton. In addition to a US theatrical run, the film aired nationally on PBS, was shown worldwide on TV, and is available in DVD. In 2005 Lofton won the prestigious Genesis Award for Best National PBS Documentary from the Humane Society of the United States, the largest animal protection organization in the US.

Following the film, Lofton was recruited by HSUS to spearhead the creation of their first TV/Film division: Animal Content in Entertainment (ACE), whose mission is to develop and support animal content in television and film. Each year ACE awards production grants to professional and student documentary filmmakers who highlight animal rights issues in short and feature-length films.
