= J. Lyndon Thornton =

American politician from Nebraska (1886–1953)

Member of the Nebraska Legislature from the 22nd district
- In office January 3, 1939 – January 5, 1943
- Preceded by: Frank S. Wells
- Succeeded by: J. E. Conklin

Personal details
- Born: January 14, 1886 Green, Kansas
- Died: May 4, 1953 (aged 67) Oregon City, Oregon
- Party: Republican
- Spouse: Elseyne Marcell (m. 1907; died 1951)
- Children: 4
- Occupation: Postmaster

J. Lyndon Thornton (January 14, 1886 – May 4, 1953) was an American Republican politician from Nebraska who served as a member of the Nebraska Legislature from the 22nd district from 1939 to 1943.

== Early life ==
Thornton was born in Green, Kansas, in 1886, and moved to Nebraska in 1895, where he grew up in Fairbury. He worked in the postmaster's office as a clerk, and in 1924, was appointed the postmaster, and stepped down in 1934. In 1935, Thornton was elected to the Fairbury City Council, and was narrowly defeated for re-election in 1937. Thornton was elected chairman of the Jefferson County Republican Party in 1936.

== Nebraska Legislature ==
In 1938, Thornton ran for the Nebraska Legislature from the 22nd district, which included Jefferson and Thayer counties. He challenged incumbent State Senator Frank S. Wells, and placed second in the primary, winning 29 percent of the vote to Wells's 35 percent. In the general election, Thornton defeated Wells with 59 percent of the vote.

Thornton ran for re-election in 1940, and was challenged by Wells in a rematch of their 1938 race. Thornton placed first in the primary, winning 57 percent of the vote to Wells's 43 percent, and defeated him with 56 percent of the vote in the general election.

In 1942, Thornton sought a third term in the legislature, and was challenged by Wells, banker J. E. Conklin, farmer B. G. Lamb, and homemaker Ruth Griffin. Thornton won 27 percent of the vote in the primary, narrowly placing first over Conklin by 3 votes, while Wells placed third with 24 percent. Conklin defeated Thornton in the general election with 52 percent of the vote.

== Personal life and death ==
He was married Elseyne Thornton from 1907 until her death in 1951. They had four children. After leaving the legislature, Thornton and his wife moved to Oregon City, Oregon, where he died on May 4, 1953.
