= Avatar: The Last Airbender =

American animated television series

- Also known as: Avatar: The Legend of Aang; Avatar; The Last Airbender
- Genre: Action-adventure; Comedy drama; Fantasy; Coming-of-age
- Created by: Michael Dante DiMartino; Bryan Konietzko
- Showrunners: Michael Dante DiMartino; Bryan Konietzko
- Voices of: Zach Tyler Eisen; Mae Whitman; Jack De Sena; Dante Basco; Jessie Flower; Dee Bradley Baker; Mako; Greg Baldwin; Grey Griffin; Mark Hamill
- Composers: Jeremy Zuckerman; Benjamin Wynn
- Country of origin: United States
- Original language: English
- No. of seasons: 3
- No. of episodes: 61 (list of episodes)

Production
- Executive producers: Michael Dante DiMartino; Bryan Konietzko
- Running time: 23 minutes
- Production company: Nickelodeon Animation Studios

Original release
- Network: Nickelodeon
- Release: February 21, 2005 – July 19, 2008

Related
- Avatar: The Last Airbender franchise

Avatar: The Last Airbender (often abbreviated as ATLA and also known as Avatar: The Legend of Aang or simply Avatar) is an American animated fantasy action television series created by Michael Dante DiMartino and Bryan Konietzko. Produced by Nickelodeon Animation Studios, it originally aired on Nickelodeon for three seasons from February 2005 to July 2008.

The series is set in a largely Asian-inspired world in which some people can telekinetically manipulate one of the four elements—water, earth, fire or air—through practices known as "bending", inspired by Chinese martial arts. The only individual who can bend all four elements, the "Avatar", is responsible for maintaining harmony among the world's four nations, and serves as the link between the physical and spirit worlds. The series follows the journey of twelve-year-old Aang, the current Avatar and last survivor of his nation, the Air Nomads, along with his friends Katara, Sokka, and Toph, as they strive to end the Fire Nation's war against the other nations and defeat Fire Lord Ozai before he conquers the world. The series also follows Zuko—the exiled prince of the Fire Nation, seeking to restore his lost honor by capturing Aang, accompanied by his uncle Iroh—and later, his sister Azula. Avatar: The Last Airbender is presented and animated in a style that combines Japanese anime influences with those of American cartoons and relies on the imagery of primarily Chinese culture, with various other influences from different East Asian, Southeast Asian, South Asian, North Asian, and indigenous American cultures.

Avatar: The Last Airbender was a ratings success and received widespread acclaim from critics and audiences, with high praise given to its characters, cultural references, art direction, voice acting, soundtrack, humor, ending, and thematic content. The series explores themes rarely touched on in youth entertainment, such as war, genocide, sexism, gender roles, imperialism, totalitarianism, class warfare, political corruption, indoctrination, animal cruelty, fate, and free choice. It won five Annie Awards, a Genesis Award, a Primetime Emmy Award, a Kids' Choice Award, and a Peabody Award. Since its release, the show has been regarded by critics as one of the most acclaimed series of the 21st century, and one of the greatest animated television series of all time. It is also considered Nickelodeon's magnum opus.

The extended franchise includes an ongoing comics series, a prequel novel series, two animated sequel series, a live-action film, and a Netflix live-action adaptation series. The complete series was released on Blu-ray in June 2018 in honor of the tenth anniversary of its finale and was made available to stream on Netflix in the United States and Canada in May 2020, on Paramount+ in June 2020, and on Amazon Prime Video in January 2021. A direct animated sequel film was scheduled to release theatrically, but was instead released on Paramount+ in July 2026.

== Series overview ==
=== Setting ===
A map of the four nations

Avatar: The Last Airbender is set in a world where human civilization consists of four nations, named after the four classical elements: the Water Tribe, the Earth Kingdom, the Fire Nation, and the Air Nomads. In each nation, certain people, known as "benders" (waterbenders, earthbenders, firebenders, and airbenders), have the ability to telekinetically manipulate and control the element corresponding to their nation, using gestures based on Chinese martial arts. The "Avatar" is the only individual with the ability to bend all four elements.

The Avatar is an international arbiter whose duty is to maintain harmony among the four nations, and act as a mediator between humans and spirits. When the Avatar dies, their spirit is reincarnated in a new body, who will be born to parents in the next nation in a set order known as the Avatar cycle: Fire, Air, Water, and Earth. By tradition, the new Avatar will travel the world to learn all four bending arts, after which they will begin in earnest their role as global peacekeeper. The Avatar can enter a condition known as the "Avatar State", in which they temporarily gain the skills and knowledge of all their past incarnations. Although this is when they are at their most powerful, if the Avatar were ever killed while in the Avatar State, the reincarnation cycle would be broken and the Avatar would cease to exist.

=== Synopsis ===
A century ago, young Avatar Aang, afraid of his new responsibilities, fled from his home and was forced into the ocean by a storm. He encased himself and his sky bison Appa in suspended animation in an iceberg near the South Pole. Shortly afterward, Fire Lord Sozin, the ruler of the Fire Nation, launched a world war to expand his nation's empire. Knowing that the Avatar must be an Air Nomad, he and his army carried out a genocide against the Air Nomads, which he timed with the arrival of a comet that gives firebenders tremendous power. A hundred years later, siblings Katara and Sokka, teenagers of the Southern Water Tribe, accidentally discover Aang and revive him.

In the first season, Aang travels with Katara and Sokka to the Northern Water Tribe to learn waterbending and be prepared to defeat the Fire Nation. Prince Zuko, the banished son of Fire Lord Ozai, pursues them, accompanied by his uncle Iroh, hoping to capture the Avatar in order to restore his honor. Aang is also pursued by Zhao, a Fire Nation admiral aspiring to win Ozai's favor. When his navy attacks the Northern Water Tribe, Zhao kills the moon spirit; Yue, the princess of the tribe, sacrifices her life to revive it, and Aang drives off the enemy fleet.

In the second season, Aang learns earthbending from Toph Beifong, a blind earthbending prodigy. Zuko and Iroh become refugees in the Earth Kingdom, eventually settling in its capital Ba Sing Se. Aang's group travels to Ba Sing Se to seek the Earth King's support for an attack on the Fire Nation during an upcoming solar eclipse, by which firebenders will be rendered powerless. Both groups are pursued by Azula, Zuko's younger sister. Azula infiltrates Ba Sing Se and instigates a coup d'état against the Earth King, bringing the capital under Fire Nation control. Zuko betrays Iroh and returns to the Fire Nation.

In the third season, Aang and his allies invade the Fire Nation during the eclipse, but are forced to retreat. Zuko abandons the Fire Nation to teach Aang firebending. Aang, raised to respect all life, wrestles with the possibility that he will have to kill Ozai to end the war. When Sozin's comet returns, Aang confronts Ozai and uses his Avatar powers to strip Ozai of his firebending ability; meanwhile, Aang's friends liberate Ba Sing Se, destroy the Fire Nation airship fleet, and capture Azula. Zuko is crowned the new Fire Lord and the war comes to an end.

=== Episodes ===
The series consists of sixty-one episodes. The first episode—an-hour-long premiere—aired on February 21, 2005, on Nickelodeon. The series concluded with a two-hour television movie broadcast on July 19, 2008. Each season of the series is known as a "book", in which each episode is referred to as a "chapter". Each book takes its name from one of the elements Aang must master: Water, Earth, and Fire. The show's first two seasons each consists of twenty episodes and the third season twenty-one. The entire series has been released on DVD in regions 1, 2, and 4.

As of May 2020, the complete series is available on Netflix in the United States. It became the most popular show on U.S. Netflix within the first week of its release there, despite not being featured on the main page. The show broke the record for longest consecutive appearance on Netflix's daily top ten list, with 60 straight days on the list, one of only two shows in the top ten record holders that was not a Netflix original series as of July 2020. Later in June 2020, the complete series became available on Paramount+ (at the time CBS All Access) and later on Amazon Prime Video in January 2021.

Book	Name	Episodes	Originally released	
Book	Name	Episodes	First released	Last released
1	Water	20	February 21, 2005	December 2, 2005
2	Earth	20	March 17, 2006	December 1, 2006
3	Fire	21	September 21, 2007	July 19, 2008

== Voice cast ==
- Zach Tyler Eisen as Aang
- Mae Whitman as Katara
- Jack De Sena as Sokka
- Dante Basco as Prince Zuko
- Dee Bradley Baker as Appa and Momo
- Mako (book 1–2) and Greg Baldwin (book 3) as Uncle Iroh
- Jessie Flower as Toph Beifong
- Grey Griffin as Princess Azula
- Mark Hamill as Fire Lord Ozai

== Development ==
=== Conception and production ===
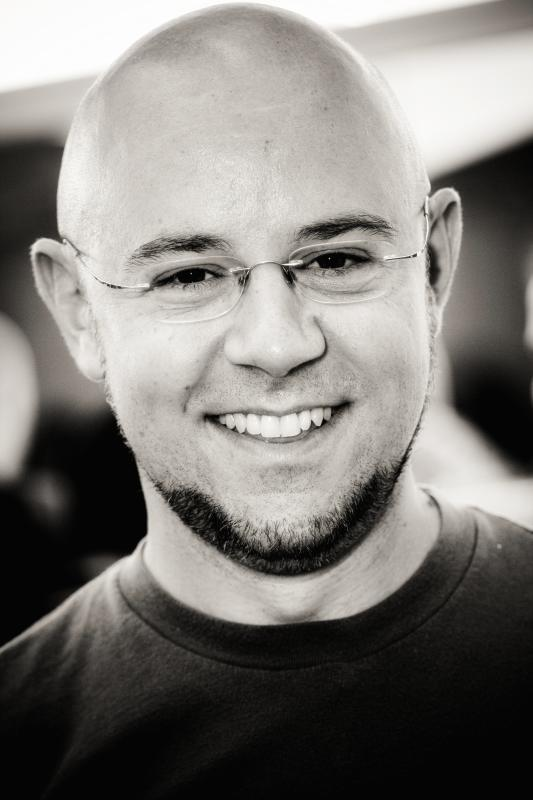
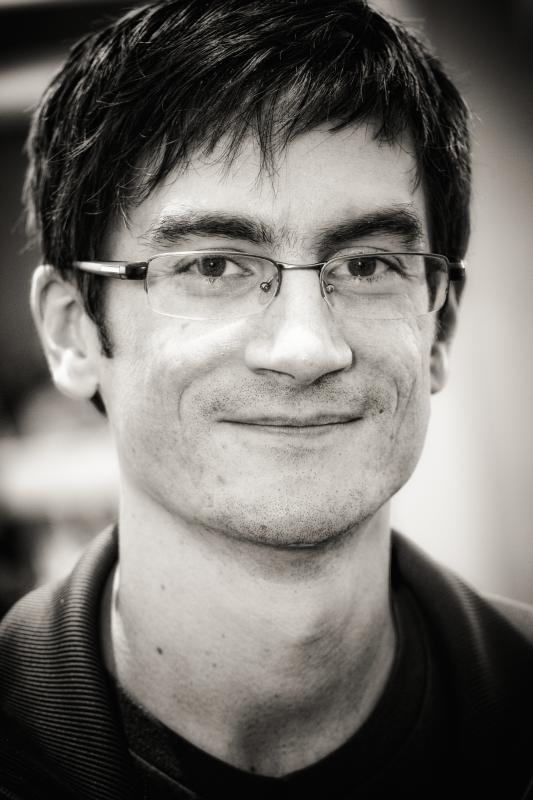
Michael Dante DiMartino (left) and Bryan Konietzko (right), the series' creators

The creators and producers of Avatar: The Last Airbender, Michael Dante DiMartino and Bryan Konietzko, met at a Halloween party in 1995 during their time as students in the Rhode Island School of Design, and began their professional partnership later that year when Konietzko assisted DiMartino in painting backgrounds and cels for the latter's student film. DiMartino and Konietzko moved to Los Angeles in 1996 and 1998 respectively to pursue careers in the animation industry. In between jobs, DiMartino animated a short titled Atomic Love that he pitched as a TV series, but was unsuccessful due to the amount of robot-based animated series already in development. During Konietzko's stint as an art director on Invader Zim, he and DiMartino formulated the idea of pitching a coming-to-age series based on their childhoods, but were too busy with their respective jobs to solidify the concept. When Invader Zim was abruptly canceled in January 2002, Konietzko declared to DiMartino his resolution to get their idea made at all cost.

By this time, Konietzko had established a good relationship with Nickelodeon head of development Eric Coleman, who was interested in the prospect of Konietzko creating and pitching his own show. Upon the end of his job on Invader Zim, Konietzko met with Coleman, introduced him to DiMartino and discussed their intent to create a series that held heart and integrity while meeting the network's commercial requirements. Although their meeting went well, Coleman revealed that the network was not looking for coming-of-age stories based on human characters. He added that the network was following the success of the Lord of the Rings and Harry Potter film series and was thus searching for non-violent action and adventure concepts with an emphasis on legends and lore. Lastly, he established that the show would require the point-of-view of either a kid hero or a non-human character, emphasizing that middle-aged human protagonists would be off-brand for Nickelodeon. Konietzko concluded the meeting with the promise of a pitch along those directives within a month.

DiMartino and Konietzko indiscriminately laid out their conceptual sketches in their effort to establish a new idea. Among them was a sketch that Konietzko created during his time on Invader Zim, which featured a robot cyclops monkey with an arrow on his head and holding a staff, a balding middle-aged man in a futuristic outfit, and a bipedal polar bear-dog hybrid. Konietzko's sketch, a "half-baked" sci-fi adventure, was primarily influenced by Cowboy Bebop. Recalling Coleman's advice against middle-aged main characters, Konietzko redrew the human character as a boy, but retained his baldness and transferred the robot's staff and arrow to him. After adding the new drawing to the collection of sketches, Konietzko began drawing other fanciful animal hybrids, which culminated in a drawing of a good-natured and nomadic "Huck Finnesque" boy herding a group of flying bison-manatee hybrids. The sketch was influenced by the works of renowned anime film director Hayao Miyazaki, of whom Konietzko and DiMartino were fans.

DiMartino drew inspiration for what would become the Southern Water Tribe from a documentary on the Imperial Trans-Antarctic Expedition, and he pitched Konietzko the idea of a group of people similarly trapped in the South Pole. Two weeks after their meeting with Coleman, Konietzko was suddenly inspired by DiMartino's idea and formulated a concept of a group of children in the South Pole who were terrorized by "fire people" and rescued by the young nomad from his earlier drawing. Konietzko and DiMartino reconvened that evening and began developing the series' setting over the next two weeks. Although DiMartino and Konietzko were themselves fans of the two successful British fantasy series that Nickelodeon sought to emulate, the pair chose to differentiate their own series by inserting influences from Asian cultures and philosophies, traditional martial arts, yoga, anime, and Hong Kong cinema. The co-creators successfully pitched the concept to Coleman with early sketches of Aang, Katara, and Sokka, three color images depicting the desired action, adventure, and magic aspects, and a description of the series' characters, setting and full story arc. The series was introduced to the public in a teaser reel at Comic-Con in July 2004, and premiered on February 21, 2005.

According to head writer Aaron Ehasz, Konietzko and DiMartino originally envisioned the series as three seasons long. However, Nickelodeon asked Ehasz about his ideas for a potential fourth season, which he later discussed with both Konietzko and DiMartino. Ehasz believed that a fourth season would be created, but this plan was interrupted when Konietzko and DiMartino decided to focus on assisting M. Night Shyamalan as executive producers for The Last Airbender film. Ehasz claims that Shyamalan insisted they create a fourth season, but Konietzko and DiMartino wanted to work on the live-action film and reverted to the original three-season plan. Konietzko and DiMartino have denied Ehasz's statements, asserting that a fourth season was never considered by them or Nickelodeon. Shyamalan has made comments that align with Ehasz's, such as acknowledging uncertainty at the time about whether the series would conclude after three seasons. Supporting the animated series going beyond three seasons, he nevertheless refused to sign on for the live-action adaptation, as he wanted to direct a trilogy.

=== Pilot ===
A pilot episode for the series was made in 2003. It was animated by Tin House, Inc., written by DiMartino and Konietzko, and directed by Dave Filoni. Mitchel Musso voiced Aang in this pilot but was later replaced by Zach Tyler Eisen when the show began production. In the episode, Sokka and his sister Kya (renamed Katara by the time the series aired) must travel the world to find masters for Aang, who is the Avatar; however, they must evade a critical foe, Prince Zuko of the Fire Nation, who wants to capture Aang.

This episode was first publicly released as one of the extras in the NTSC season 1 DVD box set, which were not available with the previously released individual volumes. As the PAL box set lacks extras, the episode was not made available on DVD in PAL regions. The episode was released with audio commentary from the creators which, unlike commentary on other episodes in the season, is not possible to disable on the DVD set. On June 14, 2010, the unaired pilot was made available with and without commentary for the first time via the iTunes Store. In 2020, the pilot was streamed on Twitch.

=== Influences ===
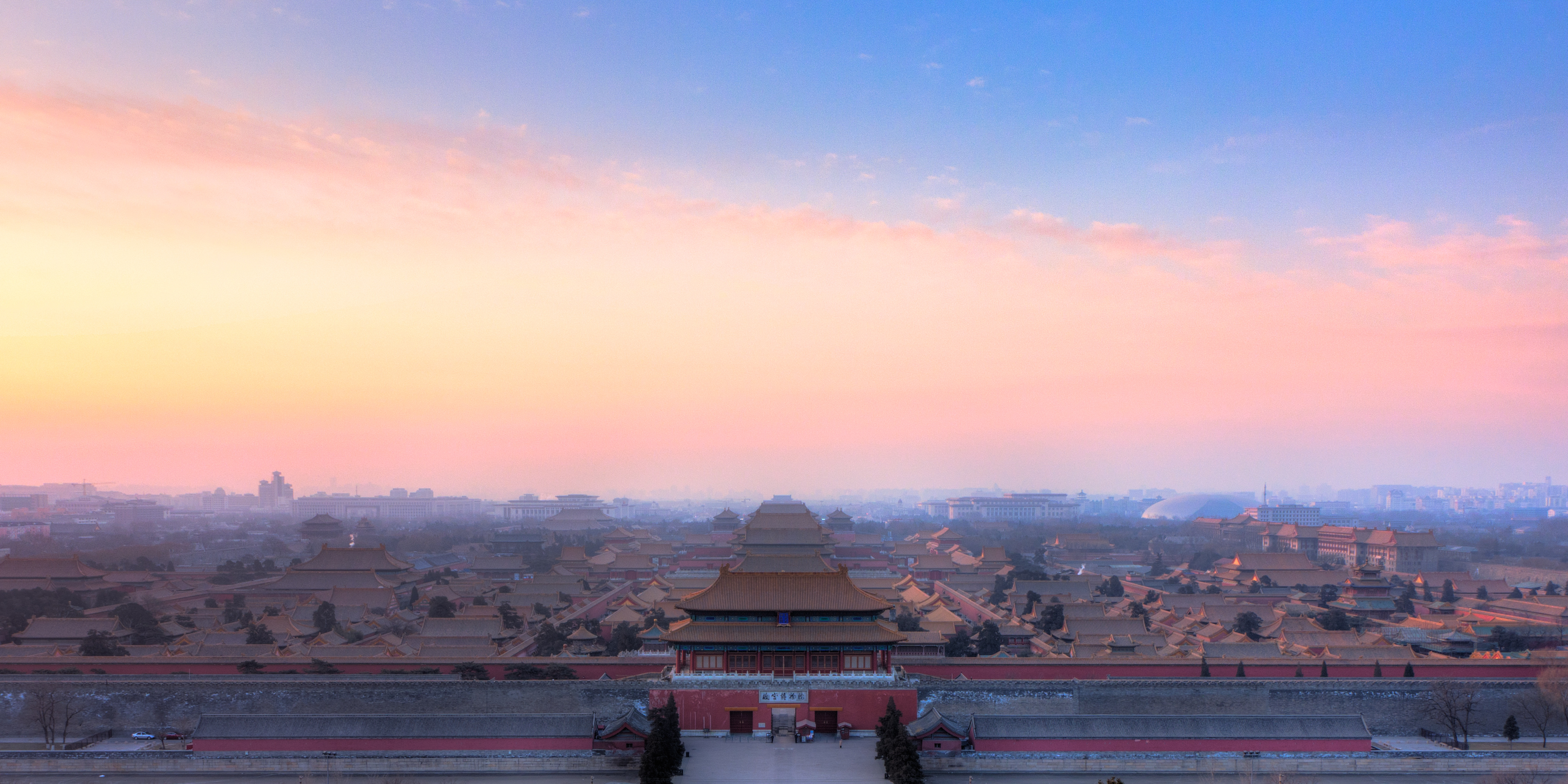
Fictional locations featured in the show are based on the architecture and designs of real locations. For example, the creators modeled the city of Ba Sing Se off the Forbidden City in Beijing, China.

The series is notable for its extensive influence from East Asian culture, art and mythology for its universe, especially Chinese culture. Its creators employed cultural consultant Edwin Zane and Chinese calligrapher Siu-Leung Lee to help determine its art direction and settings. The creators have cited Chinese art and history, Hinduism, Taoism and Buddhism, and yoga as the strongest influences on the series.

Jeremy Zuckerman and Benjamin Wynn created the series' music and sound design together in the early developmental stages and then went on to divide the tasks, with Zuckerman taking on the musical composition and Wynn the sound design. They experimented with a wide range of instruments, including the guzheng, pipa, and duduk, to match the show's Asian-influenced setting.

The art style of the fictitious locations featured in the series are based on real locations in Asia. Sites such as the Forbidden City and the Great Wall of China in Beijing were inspirations for the Earth Kingdom city of Ba Sing Se, and Water Tribe locations were based on Inuit and Sireniki cultures. According to Ehasz, early Fire Nation designs were based on Japanese culture. To avoid accidentally making broad statements, they redesigned many settings and peoples to be more "broadly inspired". For the final design, the creators went with a more Chinese style for the Fire Nation's clothing and architecture. For instance, the Fire Temple was based on the Yellow Crane Tower, as its flame-like architectural elements were considered a perfect motif for the Fire Nation architecture, according to the creators.

The gestures used by the "bender" characters are derived from Chinese martial arts, for which the creators employed Sifu Kisu of the Harmonious Fist Chinese Athletic Association as a consultant. Each fighting style is unique to the "benders" who use them or characters who are aligned to a certain element. For example, practitioners of "waterbending" use movements influenced by tai chi and focus on alignment, body structure, breath, and visualization. Hung Gar was the inspiration for practitioners of "earthbending", and was chosen for its firmly rooted stances and powerful strikes as a representation of the solidity of earth. Northern Shaolin, which uses strong arm and leg movements, was chosen to represent "firebending". Baguazhang, which uses dynamic circular movements and quick directional changes, was used for "airbending". The Chu Gar Southern Praying Mantis style can be seen practiced by the earthbender, Toph, who develops a unique fighting style as a result of her blindness. Asian cinema also influenced the presentation of these martial-art bending moves.

== Themes ==
The series addresses many topics rarely touched on in youth entertainment, including issues relating to war, genocide, imperialism, colonialism and totalitarianism, gender discrimination and female empowerment, marginalization and oppression, and spirituality, as well as philosophical questions surrounding fate, destiny, and free will.

The show is set during a period in which the world is engulfed in an imperialistic war initiated by the Fire Nation. While war is a constant backdrop, the show depicts these effects through the eyes of common people—the oppressed Earth Kingdom citizens as well as indoctrinated Fire Nation schoolchildren—to show how war can and does make victims of everyone. While the Fire Nation is presented as the instigator of violence, the show also depicts the systemic inequality experienced by residents in the Earth Kingdom city of Ba Sing Se as well as the nefarious activities of the city's corrupt secret police. These situations show the corrupting nature of power and the nuances of good and evil. The show introduces viewers to genocide early on when protagonist Aang visits his former home in the Southern Air Temple. He arrives to discover his people have been massacred and displays a range of emotions, such as rage, guilt, and sadness.

The character Zuko and his relationship with his father and Uncle Iroh is the main redemption arc of the series, and represents the show's message that destiny is not binding but rather can be changed. In season two, Zuko struggles to conform to the destiny and path determined by his father, but Iroh prods him, asking, "who are you, what do you want?"

The show also represents a diverse cast of characters in order to tackle the issue of marginalization. For example, in introducing a blind character like Toph and a paraplegic boy like Teo, the show depicts characters with vulnerabilities overcoming their physical and societal limitations. This is also true when it comes to the show's female characters. For example, female protagonist Katara faces systemic sexism when she reaches the Northern Water Tribe to learn waterbending, only to learn that girls and women are prohibited from doing so; a rule that is deeply ingrained within the culture. In another example, her brother Sokka initially espouses sexist viewpoints and is dismissive of the all-female Kyoshi Warriors, but learns to respect and appreciate their skills and mature as a person and fighter. According to Kirk Hamilton of Kotaku, these themes represent the show's message that it is more important to be oneself than to hew to societal expectations.

== Reception ==
=== Ratings ===
Avatar: The Last Airbender was the highest-rated animated television series in its demographic at its premiere; an average of 1.1 million viewers watched each new episode. and was a highly rated part of the Nicktoons lineup beyond its 6-to-11-year-old target demographic. A one-hour special, The Secret of the Fire Nation, consisting of the episodes "The Serpent's Pass" and "The Drill", aired on September 15, 2006, and attracted 4.1 million viewers. According to the Nielsen ratings, the special was the fifth highest-rated cable television program that week. In 2007, Avatar: The Last Airbender was syndicated in more than 105 countries and was one of Nickelodeon's top-rated programs. The series ranked first on Nickelodeon in Germany, Indonesia, Malaysia, the Netherlands, Belgium, and Colombia.

The four-part series finale, "Sozin's Comet", had the highest ratings of the series. Its first airing averaged 5.6 million viewers, 195 percent more than Nickelodeon had in mid-July 2007. During the week of July 14, it was the most-viewed program by the under-14 demographic. The finale's popularity was reflected in online media; Rise of the Phoenix King, a Nick.com online game based on "Sozin's Comet", had almost 815,000 plays in three days.

=== Critical response ===
Avatar: The Last Airbender received universal acclaim. As of July 2020, the show has a critics score of 100% on Rotten Tomatoes based on 23 reviews. Max Nicholson of IGN called it a "must-watch" and described it as "one of the greatest animated series of all time". Nick Hartel of DVD Talk called the series a remarkable, "child friendly show" whose legacy "should endure for years to come". Erik Amaya of Bleeding Cool described the series as "impressive in its sophistication" and "fantastic". Henry Glasheen of SLUG Magazine called the series "adventurous and exciting", a "classic" and occasionally moving. According to Brittany Lovely of Hypable, it tells "complex and beautiful" stories. Joe Corey of Inside Pulse described the series as an anime-action hybrid. Chris Mitchell of Popzara called it one of the best shows to air on Nickelodeon, praising the series' background music and voice acting. D. F. Smith of IGN recommended it to viewers who enjoy action-adventure cartoons.

Rob Keyes of Screen Rant called the series "one of the greatest cartoons ever made". Mike Noyes of Inside Pulse recommended it to viewers who enjoy "great" adventure. Gord Lacey of TVShowsOnDVD.com called the series "one of the finest animated shows ever". According to Todd Douglass Jr., of DVD Talk, adults will enjoy the series as much as children do. Joshua Miller of CHUD.com called it "phenomenal" and "one of the most well animated programs (children's or adult) American TV has ever had"; according to Miller, the series is heavily influenced by anime. Tim Janson of Cinefantastique described it as "one of the most engaging animated shows produced". Dennis Amith of J!ENT called the series "one of the best animated TV series shown in the US by American creators". Amith praised its sophisticated storylines, edginess, humor, and action. Franco "Cricket" Te of Nerd Society described Avatar: The Last Airbender as "one of the best cartoon[s]" he had ever seen, recommending the series for its characters and plot. Scott Thill of Wired called the series engaging and its setting, influenced by the Eastern world, "fantastic". Kirk Hamilton of Kotaku said the series should be considered part of the Golden Age of Television, and recommended "the sophisticated kids show" to others.

The show's writing and themes have been widely lauded by critics. Michael S. Mammano of Den of Geek called the plot "smartly-written" and praised the animation. Nicole Clark, writing for Vice News, stated that the show's narrative depth was "its greatest asset", and praised the story's "emotional authenticity" and how it "expose[d] very young viewers to darker subject matter, like genocide and authoritarianism, while giving them a framework for understanding these issues." Jenifer Rosenberg of ComicMix praised the program's emphasis on family, friends, community, and education. According to Hartel, the series touches on themes of "genocide and self-doubt" without frightening younger children; rogue characters are redeemable, sending an important message that people can change and are not bonded to "destiny". Chris Mitchell called the plot "fantastic". D. F. Smith compared the series' plot to Japanese anime, calling its tone and dialogue "very American" and praising the humor leavening an epic, dramatic theme suitable for all ages. Rob Keyes also praised the series' humor and affecting plot, saying, "[It] will capture your hearts".

According to Noyes, the series amalgamates elements of "classic fantasy epics". Douglass Jr. called the plot engaging, well-thought-out, and meaningful, stating that the series' concept was "well-realized", with a consistent story. Douglass wrote that the characters "[have] a real sense of progression", and praised the writers for their humor, drama, and emotion. Joshua Miller called the series surprisingly dark despite its "silly" theme, saying that the plot is livelier than that of Lost and, similar to the latter show, emphasizes character development. According to Miller, its writing was "true adult levels of storytelling". Janson described the series as more than fantasy- and superhero-themed, seeing the characters as central and relatable. "Cricket" Te praised the series' use of Buddhist philosophies and the diverse presentation of its themes of courage and life. Hamilton praised the series for encouraging its audience to be themselves and for its quiet progressivism.

Steven Pearce of The Encyclopedia of Science Fiction described Avatar: The Last Airbender as a landmark of Western children's animation, praising its intelligent writing, character development, thoughtful and sometimes dark storylines, humor, strong female characters, and incorporation of Asian and Pacific cultural and philosophical influences. He also highlighted the series' treatment of politics and its considerable influence on subsequent animation.

Critics also praised Avatar: The Last Airbender's character development, art, animation, and choreography; Eric Amaya enjoyed the expressive animation that complemented the writing. According to Amaya, elements were influenced by the work of Hayao Miyazaki. Douglass Jr. called the character development interesting, while Nicole Clark wrote that the show "managed to do what so few shows even today have: assemble a cast of characters that depicts the world as it is, with a range of identities and experiences." Rosenburg praised the series' portrayal of its female characters as "strong, responsible, [and] intelligent". According to Miller, the bender characters' use of bending for everyday activities brought "depth and believability" to the Avatar world. Miller called the series' designs "rich and immersive", with each nation having its own, detailed look. He praised the action scenes as "well rendered", comparing the development of the Avatar: The Last Airbender world to that of The Lord of the Rings, and the fight choreography as "wonderful in its most minor details". Smith enjoyed the series' detailed backgrounds. Te praised each episode's color palette and the choreography's combination of martial arts and magic. Hartel criticized the animation, although he found it an improvement over previous Nickelodeon shows. Mitchell called the animation fluid. Te agreed, noting its manga influence. According to Brittany Lovely, non-bender characters in battle are "overshadowed" by their bender counterparts. Joe Corey called the animation's action and environments a "great achievement", and Keyes praised the series' fight choreography. According to Hamilton, the action sequences in the series were amazing while being child-appropriate and exciting.

=== Legacy ===
Avatar: The Last Airbender became a cult classic and had a large impact in the 2010s on how networks viewed animated programs; subsequent children's shows would often blur the lines between youth and adult programming, featuring more adult themes.

Multiple media publications have hailed Avatar: The Last Airbender as one of the greatest animated television series of all time. In 2013, TV Guide included Avatar: The Last Airbender in its 60 greatest cartoons of all-time list. In 2018, Vanity Fair ranked the series as the 11th-best animated TV show. IndieWire ranked Avatar: The Last Airbender at number 36 on its 2018 list of the "50 Best Animated Series Of All Time". In a 2026 survey of the best television programs debuting in the 21st century, the readership of the New York Times ranked the series at number 37.

The series experienced a resurgence in popularity following its addition to Netflix on May 15, 2020; it reached the number-one position on the platform's top series in the U.S. four days after release, and was the most-popular film or show for the week of May 14–21. The series maintained a spot within Netflix's top ten series for a record-setting 60 days, the most of any show since the company debuted its list of top series in February 2020. The series would become the most-streamed children's series on the platform for the year. Both fans and co-creators DiMartino and Konietzko attributed Avatar: The Last Airbender's renewed popularity to its relevance to contemporary events, including the COVID-19 pandemic and racial unrest in the U.S., with DiMartino remarking: "The major issues in the stories—genocide, totalitarianism, systemic injustice, abuse—sadly, these have been pervasive issues throughout history and continue to be. The show is a reflection of our world. But now, we happen to be living through a time in which all these problems have been exacerbated."

=== Awards and nominations ===
Award nominations for Avatar: The Last Airbender
Year	Award	Category	Nominee	Status
2005	Pulcinella Awards	Best Action Adventure TV Series	Avatar: The Last Airbender	Won
2005	Pulcinella Awards	Best TV Series	Avatar: The Last Airbender	Won
2006	Annie Awards	Best Animated Television Production	Avatar: The Last Airbender	Nominated
2006	Annie Awards	Storyboarding in an Animated Television Production	Lauren MacMullan for "The Deserter"	Won
2006	Annie Awards	Writing for an Animated Television Production	Aaron Ehasz and John O'Bryan for "The Fortuneteller"	Nominated
2007	Nickelodeon Australian Kids' Choice Awards	Fave Toon	Avatar: The Last Airbender	Nominated
2007	Annie Awards	Character Animation in a Television Production	Yu Jae Myung for "The Blind Bandit"	Won
2007	Annie Awards	Directing in an Animated Television Production	Giancarlo Volpe for "The Drill"	Won
2007	Genesis Awards	Outstanding Children's Programming	"Appa's Lost Days"	Won
2007	Primetime Emmy Awards	Outstanding Animated Program	"City of Walls and Secrets"	Nominated
2007	Primetime Emmy Awards	Outstanding Individual Achievement in Animation	Sang-Jin Kim for "Lake Laogai"	Won
2008	Kids' Choice Awards	Favorite Cartoon	Avatar: The Last Airbender	Won
2008	Annecy International Animated Film Festival	TV series	Joaquim Dos Santos for "The Day of Black Sun, Part 2: The Eclipse"	Nominated
2008	Peabody Awards	Peabody Award	Avatar: The Last Airbender	Won
2008	Satellite Awards	Best Youth DVD	Book 3: Fire, Volume 4	Nominated
2009	Annie Awards	Best Animated Television Production for Children	Avatar: The Last Airbender	Won
2009	Annie Awards	Directing in an Animated Television Production	Joaquim Dos Santos for "Sozin's Comet, Part 3: Into the Inferno"	Won
2009	Golden Reel Awards	Best Sound Editing: Television Animation	"Sozin's Comet, Part 4: Avatar Aang"	Nominated
2009	Nickelodeon Australian Kids' Choice Awards	Fave Toon	Avatar: The Last Airbender	Won
2010	Nickelodeon Australian Kids' Choice Awards	Top Toon	Avatar: The Last Airbender	Nominated

== Franchise ==
=== Adaptations ===
==== The Last Airbender (2010) ====
The series' first season was adapted as the 2010 live-action film The Last Airbender, which was written and directed by M. Night Shyamalan and stars Noah Ringer as Aang, Nicola Peltz as Katara, Jackson Rathbone as Sokka, Dev Patel as Zuko, and Shaun Toub as Iroh. Although the film originally shared the title of the television series, the title The Last Airbender was used because producers feared it would be confused with James Cameron's film Avatar. It was intended as the first of a trilogy of films, each of which would be based upon one of the three television seasons. The film was universally panned for its writing, acting, whitewashed cast, and Shyamalan's direction; it has a 5% approval rating on Rotten Tomatoes and earned five Razzies at the 31st Golden Raspberry Awards, including Worst Picture; some critics have described it as one of the worst films ever made.

==== Avatar: The Last Airbender (2024–present) ====
Netflix announced in September 2018 that a "reimagined" live-action adaptation of Avatar: The Last Airbender was to start production in 2019. The series' original creators, DiMartino and Konietzko, were to be the executive producers and showrunners. On August 12, 2020, DiMartino and Konietzko both revealed on their social media that they had departed the show due to creative differences. In February 2021, Albert Kim was reported to have been brought on as showrunner. The first season was released on Netflix on February 22, 2024 to mixed reviews. On March 6, 2024, Netflix renewed the show for a second and third season.

=== Sequels ===
==== The Legend of Korra (2012–2014) ====
The Legend of Korra, a sequel series to Avatar: The Last Airbender, premiered on Nickelodeon on April 14, 2012. It was written and produced by Avatar: The Last Airbender creators Michael Dante DiMartino and Bryan Konietzko, the creators and producers of the original series. The show was initially titled Avatar: Legend of Korra, then The Last Airbender: Legend of Korra; its events occur seventy years after the end of Avatar: The Last Airbender. The series' protagonist is Korra, a 17-year-old girl from the Southern Water Tribe who is the incarnation of the Avatar after Aang's death. The series ran for 4 seasons, ending after 52 episodes on December 19, 2014.

==== Avatar: Seven Havens (2026–present) ====
On February 20, 2025, 20 years after the original show debuted, it was announced that a new sequel series titled Avatar: Seven Havens was green-lit. The series will consist of 26 episodes, spread across two seasons, and will be produced by DiMartino and Konietzko. Avatar: Seven Havens premiered on October 9, 2026, on Paramount+.

==== Avatar Aang: The Last Airbender film (2026) ====
In February 2021, along with the announcement of the formation of Avatar Studios, it was reported that the studio's first project would be an animated theatrical film that would begin production later in 2021. In June 2022, it was announced that Lauren Montgomery, a former storyboard artist on Avatar: The Last Airbender and a supervising producer for Korra, would serve as director. In April 2024, Paramount revealed the film's tentative title, Aang: The Last Airbender, along with the casting of Eric Nam as Aang, Dionne Quan as Toph, Jessica Matten as Katara, Román Zaragoza as Sokka, and Dave Bautista as an antagonist.

==== Avatar Kuruk: Wave of Chaos ====
On October 9, 2026, alongside the announcement of Seven Havens being renewed for additional seasons, a new animated series was given a production order for Paramount+. Described as an action comedy, it is a prequel set before Aang's story about a 14-year-old Kuruk during a time of peace.

== Other media ==
=== Books ===
Several books based on the show have been published. Dark Horse Comics published an art book titled Avatar: The Last Airbender – The Art of the Animated Series on June 2, 2010, with 184 pages of original art from the series. A second edition of the book was released on November 25, 2020, featuring a new cover and eight new pages.

Chronicles of the Avatar is a series of novels that tell the stories of the Avatars before Aang. The series began with the young adult novel duology focusing on Avatar Kyoshi, which was written by F. C. Yee. The first book, Avatar: The Last Airbender – The Rise of Kyoshi, was published in July 2019 by Abrams Children's Books. The second part in the series, titled The Shadow of Kyoshi, was released on July 21, 2020. The duology was followed by the third novel The Dawn of Yangchen, also written by Yee and released on July 19, 2022. Yee's fourth novel in the series, The Legacy of Yangchen, was released on July 18, 2023. The fifth book of the series, titled The Reckoning of Roku, focuses on Avatar Roku is written by Randy Ribay and released on July 23, 2024. The sixth novel, The Awakening of Roku, was also written by Ribay and released on December 30, 2025.

=== Comics ===
Several comic-book short stories were published in Nickelodeon Magazine, and Dark Horse published Avatar: The Last Airbender – The Lost Adventures—a collection of these and new comics—on June 15, 2011.

Dark Horse published a graphic-novel series by Gene Yang that continues Aang's story after the Hundred Years' War. Avatar: The Last Airbender – The Promise, published in three volumes in 2012, explores the fate of the Fire Nation colonies that become The Legend of Korra's United Republic. This series was translated into Hebrew in 2016–2017. A second set of three comic books, Avatar: The Last Airbender – The Search, focuses on Zuko and Azula, and the fate of their mother Ursa. The second set was translated into Hebrew in 2018–2019. The third set, Avatar: The Last Airbender – The Rift, shifts the focus to Aang, the creation of Republic City, and Toph's relationship with her family. The Rift was followed by Avatar: The Last Airbender – Smoke and Shadow about a resistance force in the Fire Nation against Firelord Zuko, who at the end of the original series assumed the throne. The fifth graphic novel was Avatar: The Last Airbender – North and South, which follows the events of Smoke and Shadow and is about Katara and Sokka returning to the Water Tribe to see various changes to their homeland. The next graphic novel is titled Imbalance and was released in October 2018. The series explores the emerging conflict between the benders and non-benders that becomes the center for the conflict in the first season of the sequel, The Legend of Korra. Unlike the previous five books it was written by Faith Erin Hicks.

In 2020, Dark Horse began publishing standalone comics, the first of which was Katara and the Pirate's Silver which was written by Faith Erin Hicks and Tim Hedrick and follows Katara aligning herself with a group of pirates after she gets separated from the rest of Team Avatar. The comic was released on October 13, 2020. It was followed by Toph Beifong's Metalbending Academy on February 17, 2021, which follows Toph in between the events of The Rift and Smoke and Shadow. This was followed by Suki, Alone, released on June 27, 2021, and follows Suki when she was imprisoned after the events of the episode "Appa's Lost Days". These three standalone comics were released in a boxed set in November 2021 under the name Team Avatar Treasury. This was followed by 2023's Azula in the Spirit Temple, and 2024's The Bounty Hunter and the Tea Brewer, which focuses on Iroh and June the Bounty Hunter.

=== Video games ===
A video-game trilogy based on the series has been released. The Avatar: The Last Airbender video game was released on October 10, 2006, and Avatar: The Last Airbender – The Burning Earth was released on October 16, 2007. Avatar: The Last Airbender – Into the Inferno was released on October 13, 2008. Avatar: Legends of the Arena, a massively multiplayer online role-playing game (MMORPG) for Microsoft Windows, was released on September 15, 2008, by Nickelodeon. Players can create their own character and interact with other players around the world. Avatar: The Last Airbender was THQ's bestselling Nickelodeon game in 2006 and was one of Sony CEA's Greatest Hits. Aang and Zuko appear as skins for Merlin and Susano, respectively, in Smite. A turn-based role-playing game by Navigation Games, titled Avatar Generations, was released in early 2023 for iOS and Android. In September 2023, GameMill Entertainment released Avatar: The Last Airbender - Quest for Balance, which loosely adapts the events of the entire show. Avatar: The Last Airbender characters and locations are also featured in several Nickelodeon crossover games, including Nickelodeon Kart Racers 2: Grand Prix and 3: Slime Speedway, and the Nickelodeon All-Star Brawl series. Avatar: The Last Airbender themed content is set to be released as downloadable content in Sonic Racing: CrossWorlds. A motion-based game starring Toph called Avatar: The Last Airbender Earth Rumble launched on Nex Playground on April 28, 2026.

=== Concert ===
In October 2023, Nickelodeon and GEA Live announced Avatar: The Last Airbender in Concert, an ongoing concert tour featuring Zuckerman's score for the series. The tour was initially announced for four dates and locations in the UK, US, and France, and premiered in London, England on January 21, 2024. The concert runs for over two hours and the music is performed by an orchestral ensemble, while several moments from the series are displayed on a large screen. Zuckerman, in assistance with DiMartino, Konietzko, and original editor Jeff Adams expanded the series' score and compositions for the concert. The concert is produced by Nickelodeon, GEA Live, and Senbla.

== Bibliography ==
- Konietzko, Bryan; DiMartino, Michael Dante (2010). Avatar, The Last Airbender: The Art of the Animated Series. Dark Horse. ISBN 978-1-62115-798-4.
