= Ralph W. Hill =

American politician (1893–1958)

27th Nebraska State Treasurer
- In office January 6, 1955 – July 13, 1958
- Preceded by: Frank Heintze
- Succeeded by: Bertha I. Hill

Member of the Nebraska Legislature from the 22nd district
- In office January 5, 1949 – January 5, 1955
- Preceded by: R. B. Steele
- Succeeded by: Arnold J. Ruhnke

Personal details
- Born: August 7, 1893 Hebron, Nebraska
- Died: July 13, 1958 (aged 64) Lincoln, Nebraska
- Party: Republican
- Spouse: Bertha I. Hill
- Education: University of Nebraska

Ralph W. Hill (August 7, 1893 – July 13, 1958) was a Republican politician from Nebraska who served as Nebraska State Treasurer from 1955 until his death in 1958 and as a member of the Nebraska Legislature from the 22nd district from 1949 to 1955.

== Early career ==
Hill was born in Hebron, Nebraska, and graduated from Hebron High School. He graduated from the University of Nebraska and owned and operated a furniture business and a stock raising operation.

== Nebraska Legislature ==
In 1948, Hill ran for the Nebraska Legislature in the 22nd district, which included Jefferson and Thayer counties in southeastern Nebraska. He ran against incumbent State Senator R. B. Steele and attorney George P. Burger, and narrowly placed second in the primary, receiving 37 percent of the vote to Steele's 42 percent and Burger's 21 percent. In the general election, Hill defeated Steele, 54–46 percent.

Hill ran for re-election in 1950, and was challenged by Harry Harris. In the primary election, Hill placed first, winning 52 percent of the vote to Harris's 48 percent, and the two advanced to the general election. Hill ultimately defeated Harris with 55 percent of the vote.

In 1952, Hill ran for a third term. He was challenged by former State Senator J. E. Conklin. Hill and Conklin had been friends prior to the campaign, and had an "understanding" that Hill would not seek a third term so that Conklin could return to the legislature, but they disagreed as to why the "understanding" eroded. In the primary election, Hill placed first over Conklin, winning 53 percent of the vote to Conklin's 47 percent. In the general election, Hill defeated Conklin in a landslide, winning his third term, 59–41 percent.

== Nebraska State Treasurer ==
In 1954, Hill announced that he would run for State Treasurer. Hill faced former Omaha City Commissioner Harry Knudsen and William Slagle, an examiner in the State Auditor's office, in the Republican primary. He won a plurality in the primary, receiving 43 percent of the vote to Knudsen's 38 percent and Slagle's 19 percent. In the general election, Hill faced the Democratic nominee, Richard Larsen, a county highway worker and three-time candidate for the Omaha City Council. Hill defeated Larsen by a wide margin, winning 59 percent of the vote to Larsen's 41 percent.

Hill ran for re-election in 1956, and faced a rematch with Larsen. Hill defeated Larsen by a wide margin, winning his second term 57–43 percent.

In 1958, Hill was constitutionally barred from seeking re-election, and did not seek any other office. He died on July 13, 1958, following several months of declining health. His wife, Bertha I. Hill, was appointed to serve out the remaining months of his term.
