= Calvin F. Steele =

American politician

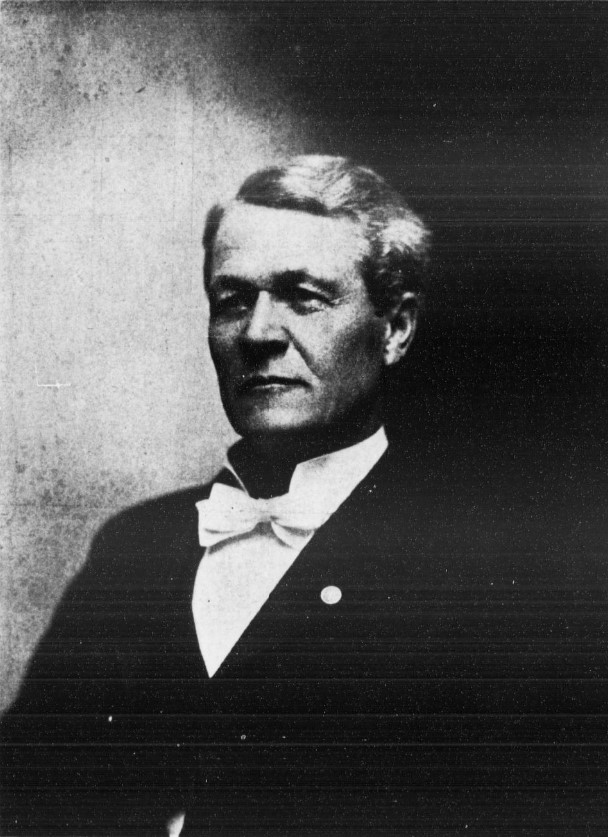

Acting Lieutenant Governor of Nebraska
- In office May 1, 1901 – January 8, 1903
- Governor: Ezra P. Savage
- Preceded by: Ezra P. Savage
- Succeeded by: Edmund G. McGilton

21st President pro tempore of the Nebraska Senate
- In office January 1901 – January 1903
- Preceded by: Adolphus R. Talbot
- Succeeded by: William H. Harrison

Member of the Nebraska State Senate
- In office 1897–1903

Personal details
- Born: August 19, 1842 Rochelle, Illinois, U.S.
- Died: March 5, 1910 (aged 67) Fairbury, Nebraska, U.S.
- Party: Republican
- Spouse: Anna Maria Steele
- Children: 2 (including R. B.)

Calvin Fisher Steele (August 19, 1842 – March 5, 1910) was a Nebraska businessman who served in the Nebraska State Senate from 1897 to 1903, and as President pro tempore of the Senate from 1901 to 1903. Due to his position as President pro tempore of the Senate and the elevation of Lieutenant Governor Ezra P. Savage to Governor of Nebraska, he also served as Acting Lieutenant Governor.

== Early life ==
Steele was born on a farm in Ogle County near Rochelle, Illinois, and served with Company I of the Second Illinois Cavalry during the Civil War.

== Career ==
Shortly after the war, Steele came to Nebraska and located in Fairbury, Nebraska, where he lived for the rest of his life. He engaged in the furniture business, and was reported to be one of the largest dealers of furniture in southern Nebraska at the time. He served twice as the sheriff of Jefferson County and also twice as the county treasurer.

In 1896, Steele was elected to the Nebraska State Senate as a Republican and served there until 1903. In 1901, he was elected to the top office in the Senate as president pro tempore of the Nebraska State Senate, where it was noted that he was "well versed in parliamentary law."

On May 1, 1901, after serving only four months as Governor of Nebraska, Charles H. Dietrich resigned from being governor as he had been elected by the Nebraska Legislature to fill the vacant U.S. Senate term of Monroe L. Hayward, who had died. Thus, Ezra P. Savage, the state's current Lieutenant Governor, became the Governor of Nebraska. Although Steele is not listed in recent editions of the Nebraska Blue Book as having served as Lieutenant Governor, multiple sources from the time indicate that after the elevation of Ezra P. Savage to Governor, Steele was considered the Acting Lieutenant Governor due to his position as president pro tempore of the Nebraska Senate based on a misinterpretation of Article V, Section 18, of the Nebraska Constitution. (Article V, Section 18, of the Nebraska Constitution at the time provided that "If there be no lieutenant governor..., the president [pro tempore] of the senate shall act as governor until the vacancy is filled, or the disability removed...." This would only take effect if the office of Governor of Nebraska was vacant and there was no Lieutenant Governor then in office to fill it. It should not have been applied to the case where only the office of lieutenant governor was vacant.) Thus, in the 1915 Nebraska Blue Book and the 1918 Nebraska Blue Book, Steele is listed as having served as Lieutenant Governor, even replacing any mention of Ezra P. Savage's brief stint as Lieutenant Governor. Steele is also called the "lieutenant governor," "former Lieutenant Governor," and "ex-lieutenant governor" in local newspaper accounts of the time. However, by 1920, Steele was not being included in the list of lieutenant governors of Nebraska in the Nebraska Blue Book though some later editions of the Blue Book specifically noted in the list of lieutenant governors that Steele was the president pro tempore of the Nebraska Senate during the time that the lieutenant governor's office was vacant.

== Personal life ==
Steele married Anna Maria Strickland, and they had two children. He died in Fairbury, Nebraska, in 1910. He is interred in Fairbury Cemetery, Fairbury, Jefferson County, Nebraska. His son, R. B. Steele, was elected to the unicameral Nebraska Legislature in 1946.
