= Last Chance Highway =

Last Chance Highway is an 8-part series on Animal Planet. It is about animal rescuer, Shelly Bookwalter, who rescues dogs from the streets and from kill shelters. The theme song, also called "Last Chance Highway", was written by Lucas Hoge, who also featured in the series.

Produced by Al Roker's entertainment firm, the eight hour-long episodes follow dogs transitioning from high-kill shelters to permanent homes. Kyle and Pam Peterson's trucking company transports the rescued dogs to their new owners.

Bookwalter runs Double Dog Rescue South, a Mississippi rescue organization. The adoptions are arranged through Petfinder, an online pet adoption website. Bookwalter said the show had increased the number of people adopting the dogs she rescued, but had also increased the number of owners surrendering their pets to her.
