= Wild Rescues =

American television series

Wild Rescues is an American documentary television program about rescuing animals and people. It was shown on the channel Animal Planet.

Episode in 1997: included family saved by their hamster when hamster alerted 7 year-old to fire in her bedroom
