= List of The Dragon Prince characters =

Characters from the animated TV series

The following is a list of characters from The Dragon Prince, which is an animated fantasy television series created by Aaron Ehasz and Justin Richmond for Netflix that premiered in 2018 and concluded in 2024.

== Main characters ==
- Prince / High Mage Callum (voiced by Jack DeSena) is a teenage human mage, Ezran's older maternal half-brother and King Harrow's stepson. He becomes the first human to freely wield primal magic - specifically the Sky and Ocean arcanums - and develops a romantic relationship with Rayla. In the two years following the Battle of the Storm Spire, he becomes the new High Mage of Katolis, succeeding Viren, and serves on the Katolian High Council.
- Rayla (voiced by Paula Burrows) is a teenage Moonshadow Elf assassin who teams up with Callum and Ezran to deliver the Dragon Prince back to his mother. In time, she and Callum begin a romantic relationship, which soon becomes strained due to her decision to leave him to find confirmation of Viren's demise. In the two years following the Battle of the Storm Spire, she follows in her parents' footsteps and becomes the Last Dragonguard.
- Crown Prince / King Ezran (voiced by Sasha Rojen) is the young son of King Harrow and Queen Sarai, the former rulers of the human kingdom of Katolis, and Callum's maternal younger half-brother who has the telepathic ability to speak with and understand the thoughts and feelings of animals. He is later crowned the King of Katolis, succeeding his father.
- Lord / High Mage Viren (voiced by Jason Simpson) was King Harrow's closest advisor and the High Mage of Katolis. A practitioner of dark magic, he sought the advancement of the human race and their dominance over Xadia by any means necessary, resulting in him becoming manipulated by the mysterious Startouch Elf Aaravos during his pursuits to ensure the safety and survival of humanity. During the Battle of the Storm Spire, he is killed by Rayla who sends him plummeting from the spire's summit to his death. Two years later, he is resurrected by Claudia, albeit only for thirty days, and begins to regret his past choices. With Claudia having performed a blood ritual to keep Viren alive permanently, he turns his back on Aaravos and dark magic and wishes to atone for his crimes. When Katolis is attacked by Sol Regem, Viren uses a spell to protect the people from the Archdragon's fire but sacrifices himself in the process.
- Claudia (voiced by Racquel Belmonte) is Viren's daughter, Soren's younger sister, and a talented dark mage, like her father. She remains loyal to Viren regardless of his ambitions or actions. Upon her father's death, she spent two years traveling throughout Xadia to claim the necessary rare ingredients to return Viren to life, but only for thirty days. During this time, she starts a relationship with the Earthblood Elf Terrestrius. Believing in Aaravos' claim that he can permanently prolong her father's new life, she seeks to release him from his prison. After reaching the Sea of the Castout, she loses her left leg during a confrontation with Rayla and Terry later creates a wooden prosthetic for her. She bonds with Aaravos and aids him in his efforts to unleash the shades of the dead on the living world to exact his revenge, but is forced to flee when the Archdragons destroy the rogue Startouch Elf, and at the end of the series awaits his return.
- Soren (voiced by Jesse Inocalla) is Viren's son, Claudia's older brother, and a loyal member of the Katolian Crownguard. While boastful and immature, he is a skillful and good-hearted soldier. He ultimately abandons his father and remains loyal to Ezran and the Kingdom of Katolis. In the two years following the Battle of the Storm Spire, he becomes the head of the Crownguard and serves on the Katolian High Council.
- Bait (vocalized by Jack DeSena) is an extremely grumpy Glow Toad attuned to Sun Magic and Ezran's companion. He has the magical ability to emanate light from his body, which varies in color depending on his emotional state.
- Prince Azymondias, more commonly known as Zym, (vocalized by Jack DeSena and voiced by Dante Basco) is an infant Storm Dragon, son of the deceased King Avizandum and Queen Zubeia, and the titular character of the series. After reuniting with his mother, he began to further develop his natural Sky Magic abilities. After the death of the Archdragons at the end of the series, he gains the ability to speak.
- Aaravos, also known as the Fallen Star, (voiced by Erik Todd Dellums) was an ancient Startouch Elf Archmage who had mastery over all six sources of primal magic and dark magic, that he first bestowed upon humankind to the mage Ziard. In the ancient past, his daughter Leola was executed by the Startouch Elf Council for disrupting the cosmic order, and ever since worked to break the cosmic order and punish her killers. Three centuries before the beginning of the series, he was imprisoned by the Archdragons and the elves within a hidden prison for having orchestrated a series of conflicts between the humans, elves, and dragons. After coming into contact with Viren through Avizandum's enchanted mirror, Aaravos manipulates him into helping accomplish his own sinister goals. He communicates with Viren using a caterpillar-like familiar that eventually grows in size before spinning a cocoon and hatching into a part-human, part-Startouch Elf homunculus attuned to Star Magic. This specific homunculus is referred to as "The Being". After the destruction of Katolis, Aaravos is finally freed from his prison by Claudia and assumes a human form to move undetected. At the end of the series, his mortal form is destroyed by the remaining Archdragons at the cost of their own lives, although he promises to return in seven years when the stellar alignments enable him to assume a corporeal form once more.
- General / Queen Consort Amaya (voiced by Sheila Ferguson) is the deaf maternal aunt of Callum and Ezran who communicates in sign language. She is the commander of the Standing Battalion, a Katolian army that guards The Border which divides the human kingdoms from Xadia. She later becomes engaged to Janai, the Queen of the Sunfire Elves and her former rival and they soon marry, making her the queen consort of the Sunfire Elves.
- Corvus (voiced by Omari Newton) is a veteran soldier in the Standing Battalion and a highly skilled tracker. He is dispatched by Amaya to track down Ezran and safely return him to Katolis so he can be crowned king. In the two years following the Battle of the Storm Spire, he joins the Crownguard and serves on the Katolian High Council.
- Princess / Queen Janai, also known by her military title the Golden Knight of Lux Aurea, (voiced by Rena Anakwe) is a seasoned Sunfire Elf warrior, the younger sister of Khessa and the older sister of Karim. Due to her past accomplishments, she acts as a champion of her people and previously led the army of elves that guarded The Border. Following the death of her sister, she becomes the new queen of the Sunfire Elves, leading her people from a refugee camp following the abandonment of Lux Aurea. She later becomes engaged to Amaya, her former rival and prisoner, and they soon marry.
- Prince Karim (voiced by Luc Roderique) is the younger brother of Khessa and Janai and a Sun Mage. He is a fundamentalist who strives to maintain the histories and traditions of his people and fears that the Sunfire Elves would forget their cultural heritage if they mixed with the humans, which drives him into plotting against his sister. With the help of his lover Miyana, he later challenges his sister to a blood duel in a bid to take over leadership of the Sunfire Elves but is defeated, and subsequently banished. During his banishment, he uses a Sun Seed to restore Sol Regem's wings to have him return as King of the Dragons. After leading an army of loyalists to war against his sister, Sol Regem abandons him and Karim is defeated. He refuses to relent when his insurrection fails, even after he learns that Miyana bears his child, and once again betrays his sister by trying to join forces with Aaravos, who instead kills him.
- Terrestrius, more commonly known as Terry, (voiced by Benjamin Callins) is a goofy Earthblood Elf who befriended Claudia and became her boyfriend during her quest to resurrect Viren following the Battle of the Storm Spire. He joins Claudia and Viren on their journey across Xadia to release Aaravos from his prison. After realizing Aaravos' wickedness and Claudia's willingness to go along with his plans, regardless of the consequences, Terry breaks off their relationship and joins Ezran and the High Council of Katolis in their efforts to stop Aaravos.
- Stella is an orphaned Cuddlemonkey attuned to Star Magic who was adopted by Rayla during her quest to find confirmation of Viren's demise. She has the magical ability to create portals that she can use to travel or pull objects through.

== Supporting characters ==
=== Humans ===
==== Kingdom of Katolis ====
- King Harrow (voiced by Luc Roderique) was the King of the human kingdom of Katolis, husband of Sarai, father of Ezran, and stepfather of Callum. He was successfully assassinated by Runaan, leader of the Moonshadow Elf assassins, who sought vengeance for the death of Avizandum, whom Harrow and Viren had killed to avenge Sarai's death. However, at the end of the series, it is revealed that Harrow's soul was transferred into his pet bird Pip, prompting his subjects to search for him.
- Queen Sarai (voiced by Kazumi Evans) was the former Queen of Katolis, wife of King Harrow, mother of Callum and Ezran, and the elder sister of Amaya. Nine years before the beginning of the series, she was killed by Avizandum during a quest into Xadia to retrieve a Magma Titan heart that could cure the famine afflicting Katolis. Following this, a statue was built in her memory.
- Barius (voiced by Jason Simpson) is a skilled baker in Katolis who is fond of Ezran, despite his habit of stealing Barius' jelly tarts. Two years after the Battle of the Storm Spire, he joins the Katolian High Council as the "Minister of Crusts and Jellies".
- Opeli (voiced by Paula Burrows) is the High Cleric of Katolis and a prominent member of the Katolian High Council who remains loyal to Ezran, opposing Viren and his use of dark magic. Following Viren's takeover of Katolis, she leads Ezran's loyalists to seek aid from the kingdom of Duren, before joining their king in the Battle of the Storm Spire. Two years after the battle, she remains the only member of the High Council who served under Harrow.
- Marcos (voiced by Jesse Inocalla) is a young soldier in the Crownguard who was spared by Rayla when she and the other Moonshadow Assassins infiltrated Kalolis. He later befriends the Sunfire Elf archer Sabah during the Battle of the Storm Spire.
- Commander Gren (voiced by Adrian Petriw) is Amaya's sign language interpreter and the loyal second-in-command of the Standing Battalion. Two years following the Battle of the Storm Spire, he remains at Amaya's side when she relocates to Lux Aurea.
- Tristan (voiced by Sam Vincent), is a mercenary who has a strong hatred of elves and wields a Sunfire Elf dagger he obtained whilst fighting at The Border.
- Allen (voiced by Sam Vincent), is a resident of the village at the foot of the Cursed Caldera who challenges Tristan to a duel. He later develops a relationship with the Moonshadow Elf Lujanne and moves to live with her at the Moon Nexus.
- Ellis (voiced by Nahanni Mitchell) is a young girl from the village at the foot of the Cursed Caldera. Along with her wolf companion Ava, she helps guide Callum, Rayla, and Ezran to the Moon Nexus.
- The Veterinarian (voiced by Jay Brazeau) is an elderly doctor who cares for injured animals in the village at the foot of the Cursed Caldera.
- The Associate Crow Lord, formerly known as The Crow Master, (voiced by Cole Howard) is the deputy of the ever-absent Crow Lord, the chief caretaker of the Katolian court's messenger crows. In the two years following the Battle of the Storm Spire, with the Crow Lord's continued absence, he is promoted to Associate Crow Lord.
- Lieutenant Fen (voiced by Sam Vincent) is a high-ranking soldier in the Standing Battalion stationed at The Border.
- Saleer (voiced by Jonathan Holmes) is a member of the Katolian High Council who became Viren's ally and helped him unite the human kingdoms against the elves. Following the Battle of the Storm Spire, he is incarcerated for committing high treason against King Ezran.
- Lucia (voiced by Ana Sani) is the architect of the Sunfire Elf refugee camp. After callously interrupting a ritual concerning the recently deceased mother of the Sunfire Elf Yonnis, she becomes the subject of a trial to decide the severity of her punishment and is spared by Janai.
- The Orphan Queen was an ancestor of Harrow and Ezran. Three centuries before the beginning of the series, she helped save the world from Aaravos by exposing his sinister crimes to the dragons and the elves, leading to his incarceration. She also wielded the Nova Blade but chose to spare Aaravos and imprison him instead. Following this, she would become the queen of Katolis.

==== Kingdom of Duren ====
- Queen Aanya (voiced by Zelda Ehasz) is the juvenile ruler of Duren who is wise beyond her years and a skilled archer. She survived the assassination attempt by one of Viren's shadow creatures and despite the other human kingdoms seeking war against the elves, she sought peace and allied with Ezran's loyalists. Two years after the Battle of the Storm Spire, she reunites with Ezran and helps him and Katolis in their struggle against Aaravos.
- Queen Annika and Queen Neha (voiced by Paula Burrows and Patricia Isaac) were the former joint rulers of the kingdom of Duren and the mothers of Aanya. Nine years before the beginning of the series, they were both killed by Avizandum during a quest into Xadia to retrieve a Magma Titan heart that could cure the famine afflicting Duren.

==== Kingdom of Neolandia ====
- King Ahling (voiced by Ian James Corlett) is the ruler of the kingdom of Neolandia and the father of Kasef. After he is severely injured in an attempted assassination by one of Viren's shadow creatures, his son temporarily takes his place as ruler of Neolandia.
- Crown Prince Kasef (voiced by Vincent Tong) was the heir to the kingdom of Neolandia who took the throne after his father, King Ahling, was gravely injured, and rallied his people to war against the elves. Believing in Viren's plan to conquer Xadia, he becomes the first to be empowered by dark magic, enhancing his physical strength and durability. During the Battle of the Storm Spire, he is killed by Aanya.

==== Kingdom of Del Bar ====
- King Florian was the ruler of the kingdom of Del Bar. He is successfully assassinated by one of Viren's shadow creatures, leading the kingdom of Del Bar to seek war against the elves.
- Lissa (voiced by Stephanie Izsak) was the ex-wife of Viren and the mother of Soren and Claudia. Before the beginning of the series, she divorced Viren after he used dark magic to cure Soren from illness and returned to her homeland of Del Bar. In an attempt to convince Claudia to stop aiding Aaravos, Lujanne uses an illusion to assume Lissa's appearance from 15 years prior at the Moon Nexus, but Claudia sees through the disguise.

==== Kingdom of Evenere ====
- Queen Fareeda was the ruler of the kingdom of Evenere. She is successfully assassinated by one of Viren's shadow creatures, leading the kingdom of Evenere to seek war against the elves.

==== Miscellaneous ====
- Captain Villads (voiced by Peter Kelamis) is a blind and eccentric ex-pirate and captain of the ship the Ruthless. He helps transport Callum, Rayla, and Ezran across the sea in southern Katolis on their journey to The Border. In the two years following the Battle of the Storm Spire, he had relocated to Scumport, with Nyx joining his crew. He later becomes the captain of Sea Legs following the death of Finnegrin, who had destroyed the Ruthless.
- Ziard (voiced by Brian Drummond) was the first human mage to use dark magic after he was gifted a powerful staff by Aaravos. Over one thousand years before the beginning of the series, he was killed in battle with Sol Regem when he refused to relinquish his newfound power. His staff would eventually come into Viren's possession. After Claudia and Aaravos invert the Moon Nexus and release the spirits trapped in the In-Between, the shade of Ziard is released into the world and frees Avizandum's spirit from his petrified body and is later destroyed when the sun rises.
- Kpp'Ar (voiced by Greg Rogers) was a dark mage and Viren's former mentor. Before the beginning of the series, when Soren was a sick child, Viren steals the Staff of Ziard from Kpp'Ar and traps his spirit in a cursed coin. While Viren is in a comatose state caused by using dark magic for the first time since his resurrection, Kpp'Ar appears to him in a vision and taunts him about his past.
- The Jailer was a human mage and mastermind of creating puzzles. Three centuries before the beginning of the series, she designed Aaravos' prison and worked with Akiyu in its creation. She then divided information about the prison among the Archdragons to ensure that Aaravos could never be freed.
- Captain Esmerelda Skall (voiced by Laara Sadiq) was a renowned explorer and the captain of the ship Ray of Illumination. Over a century after her ship was grounded in the Frozen Sea, her diary is discovered and read by Rayla during her and Callum's journey to the Starscraper which details Esmerelda's regrets about not professing her love to Conrad, the man she wanted to marry.

=== Elves ===
The elves are divided into six races based on the six primal elements; Moonshadow Elves, Skywing Elves, Sunfire Elves, Earthblood Elves, Tidebound Elves, and Startouch Elves.

==== Moonshadow Elves ====
- Runaan (voiced by Jonathan Holmes) is the leader of the group of Moonshadow Elf assassins who travel to Katolis to assassinate King Harrow, seeking vengeance for the death of Avizandum. He became Rayla's legal guardian after her parents, Lain and Tiadrin, left to fulfill their duty as part of the Dragonguard and later disappeared. While he was able to successfully assassinate Harrow, he was subsequently defeated by Viren, and his spirit was trapped within a cursed coin. This coin would eventually come into Rayla's possession, who seeks to find a way to free him. Rayla and Callum eventually free his spirit from the cursed coin, and he joins them in their fight against Aaravos for the rest of the series.
- Ram, Skor, Callisto, and Andromeda were four Moonshadow Elves who made up Runaan's group of assassins alongside Rayla. During the assassination attempt on King Harrow, they are killed by soldiers of the Crownguard. Their spirits are later corrupted by Viren using dark magic and transformed into shadow creatures that he sends to attack the other human monarchs. Rayla is later granted forgiveness by their spirits during a ritual at the Silvergrove to end her banishment.
- Lujanne (voiced by Ellie King) is a Moon Mage who lives in Katolis at the Moon Nexus and is an expert illusionist. She later develops a relationship with the human Allen.
- Ethari (voiced by Vincent Gale) is Runaan's husband and Rayla's guardian who, being an expert metalsmith, forged her butterfly blades. Two years after the Battle of the Storm Spire, he had come to believe that Runaan had died, but tearfully reunites with him after he and Rayla return him to the Silvergrove.
- Tiadrin and Lain (voiced by Ely Jackson and Tyrone Savage) were Rayla's long-lost mother and father who were members of the Dragonguard, an organization of elves who were sworn to protect the egg of the Dragon Prince. Following Avizandum's death, the Dragonguard disbands, and Viren defeats them both before trapping their spirits in cursed coins. These coins would eventually come into Rayla's possession, who sought to find a way to free them and reunite with her parents. After traveling to the spirit world, Rayla allows her parents' spirits to pass on and be freed from the cursed coins.
- Kim'dael, also known as the Bloodmoon Huntress, (voiced by Laara Sadiq) is a rogue Blood Mage who founded the Order of a Blood Moon, a group of Moonshadow Elves who utilized forbidden magic to prolong their lifespan and amplify their abilities by drinking the blood of other magical beings. After the order was wiped out by Avizandum, leaving Kim'dael the only survivor, she pledged herself to Queen Aditi, who placed a magical collar known as the Mercy Debt around Kim'dael's neck, forcing her to serve Aditi and her descendants. Hundreds of years later, she is summoned by Karim, who promises to free her if she steals a Sun Seed from Janai. However, she turns on him when she learns that he is unable to deliver on his promise, and disappears again.
- Lyrennus (voiced by Lee Majdoub) is Ram's father and the keeper of the Well of the Forgotten, a ritual site at the Silvergrove, the home of Rayla, Runaan, and Ethari. He conducts a ritual to help end Rayla's banishment, but blames Rayla for his son's death, before managing to forgive her and lift her curse.
- Lira (voiced by Zola Mitchell) is a mischievous child whom Callum supervises at the Silvergrove so Ethari can help prepare a celebratory feast.

==== Skywing Elves ====
- Naimi-Selari-Nykantia, or more commonly known as Nyx, (voiced by Rhona Rees) is an avaricious Skywing Elf and one of the few of her kind gifted with natural wings who wishes to profit from any chance she gets. In the two years following the Battle of the Storm Spire, she becomes the disputed captain of the Ruthless after beating Villads in a game of Danger Dice.
- Ibis (voiced by Ian James Corlett) was a Sky Mage who acted as the liaison between Queen Zubeia and the elves. Born without wings, he used Sky Magic to transform his arms into wings when required. Two years after the Battle of the Storm Spire, he had begun training Azymondias to utilize his natural Sky Magic abilities. Ibis later confronts Claudia who had infiltrated the Storm Spire to recover Viren's staff and he's mortally wounded by Terrestrius. His last act involved performing a spell to warn Zubeia of Aaravos' return before succumbing to his injuries.
- Hendyr (voiced by Iain Hendry) is a winged Skywing Elf and former member of the Dragonguard who fled his post at the Storm Spire following Avizandum's death.
- The Elder (voiced by Mark Gibbon) is the winged leader of the Celestial Elves, a sect of permanently blindfolded Skywing Elves dedicated to protecting magical artifacts and worshipping the stars. Having only been allowed to take his blindfold off once when he was a child centuries prior, he seeks to fulfill a prophecy known as the "Chosen Two" that will allow his people to see the stars once again.
- Astrid (voiced by Boone Williams) is a winged Skywing Elf, a member of the Celestial Elves, and Kosmo's sister. After Kosmo has a vision of Aaravos' return, Astrid removes her blindfold and abandons the Celestial Elves to warn Callum and Rayla after the Elder refuses to intervene, and joins them in their fight against Aaravos.
- Kosmo (voiced by Ethan Farrell) is a member of the Celestial Elves and Astrid's brother. Born without wings, he uses starsilk to create artificial wings. After Callum and Rayla fulfill the "Chosen Two" prophecy and stop the ice storm surrounding the Starscraper, Kosmo removes his blindfold for the first time and becomes time-blind, allowing him to see into the past and future.

==== Sunfire Elves ====
- Queen Khessa (voiced by Brenda Crichlow) was Janai and Karim's older sister and the Queen of the Sunfire Elves who ruled from their capital of Lux Aurea. After Viren arrives in Lux Aurea on his way to the Storm Spire, Aaravos reveals to Khessa his role in Aditi's death, before killing her and corrupting the Sunforge, the Sun Nexus, resulting in the Sunfire Elves later abandoning Lux Aurea after it was corrupted with dark magic.
- Kazi (voiced by Ashleica Edmond) is an intelligent linguist serving under Khessa and, later, Janai who once frequented the great library in Lux Aurea.
- Pharos (voiced by Deven Mack) was the former high priest of the Sunfire Elves, a Sun Mage, and one of Queen Khessa's former advisors. When Viren arrives in Lux Aurea, Pharos is possessed by Aaravos who uses him to corrupt the Sunforge and is seemingly killed. Pharos' staff is then taken by Viren and used to empower many of his soldiers with dark magic. Two years after the Battle of the Storm Spire, having survived Lux Aurea's corruption from dark magic, he sought a way to restore the Sunfire Elves to their former glory and allies with Karim. He is later corrupted by Aaravos and rides Sol Regem to attack Katolis. After destroying the city, Aaravos possesses Pharos, and angered by his deception, Sol Regem devours him.
- Sabah is an archer who befriends the human Marcos during the Battle of the Storm Spire.
- General Miyana (voiced by Cecilly Day) is a former member of the Six Horns, a council of Sunfire Elf generals, and Karim's lover. She later chooses to abandon Janai, bringing a Sun Seed and an army of Sunfire Elf defectors to Karim's cause. After Karim's army of loyalists is defeated by Janai, Miyana is stripped of her title and is discovered to be pregnant with Karim's child, later revealed to be twins. But after she fails to dissuade him from turning away from his path of treachery, and his subsequent death at Aaravos' hands, she peacefully reintegrates herself.
- Yonnis (voiced by Deven Mack) is a Sunfire Elf in the refugee camp who is mourning the loss of his mother.
- Queen Aditi was the great-grandmother of Khessa, Janai, and Karim, a Sun Mage and the former Queen of the Sunfire Elves. Three centuries before the beginning of the series, she acted as a mediator between the elves and dragons. Following the death of Luna Tenebris, Aditi was chosen to determine the next ruler of the Dragons but she ultimately disappeared, having been killed by Aaravos.

==== Earthblood Elves ====
- Warlon (voiced by Bill Newton) is a boisterous Drakerider who acts as one of the guardians of the Drakewood.
- N'than (voiced by Dylan Schombing) is a juvenile Earthblood Elf who longs to become a Drakerider. He becomes a guide to Callum, Rayla, Ezran, and Soren by helping them reach Umber Tor.
- Mukho (voiced by Anand Rajaram) is a Mushroom Mage who lives in a secret forest grove inhabited by Mushpals, a race of mushroom-shaped humanoids. He is a skilled herbalist and uses his unique form of magic to heal a weakened Zubeia, who had been infected with dark magic.

==== Tidebound Elves ====
- Akiyu, also known as Tidebound Tina, (voiced by Julie Lemieux) was an elderly Tidebound Elf and an Ocean Archmage. Three centuries before the beginning of the series, she worked with the Jailer to create Aaravos' prison. Having kept the location of Aaravos' prison a secret for hundreds of years, she was sought after by Callum, Rayla, Ezran, and Soren to find the prison and stop Aaravos' escape and reveal to them its location within the Sea of the Castout. After Aaravos is freed, she is killed by Claudia to prevent his reinternment.
- Captain Finnegrin (voiced by Tariq Leslie) was an Ocean Mage and the pirate captain of the warship Sea Legs who ruled over the island town of Scumport. He sought to find a way to kill Domina Profundis, Archdragon of the Ocean, having been previously defeated by her due to him hunting numerous sea creatures like Sea Leviathans. Elmer, Finnegrin's bodyguard, is later convinced to turn against his captain by Soren before feeding him to a Sea Leviathan.

==== Startouch Elves ====
- The Merciful One (voiced by Hanna Hofer) is a compassionate Startouch Elf and member of the Startouch Elf council who oversees the cosmic order of the universe. They comfort Aaravos after the death of his daughter.
- The Stern One (voiced by Brian Drummond) is a member of the Startouch Elf council who sentences Leola to death for disrupting the cosmic order.
- Leola (voiced by Ridley Simpson) was the young daughter of Aaravos. In the ancient past, after accidentally introducing magic to humans, she was sentenced to death by the Startouch Elf council.
- Laurelion was a warrior who lived over three thousand years before the beginning of the series and was slain by the Archdragon Shirukah.

=== Magical creatures ===
==== Dragons ====
- King Avizandum, also known as Thunder to humans, (voiced by Chris Metzen) was an Archdragon of the Sky and former King of the Dragons, having succeeded Luna Tenebris. He was the mate of Zubeia and the father of Azymondias. Three centuries before the beginning of the series, he imprisoned Aaravos after his crimes were exposed and used an enchanted mirror to glimpse into Aaravos' prison to keep an eye on him, which in turn was Aaravos' only connection to the outside world. Nine years before the beginning of the series, he confronted the Katolis and Duren monarchs who trespassed into Xadia seeking a Magma Titan heart and would ultimately kill both Queen Sarai and Queens Annika and Neha. Several years later, he was confronted and petrified by Harrow and Viren, who sought vengeance for him having killed Sarai. After Claudia and Aaravos invert the Moon Nexus and release the spirits trapped in the In-Between, the shade of Ziard frees Avizandum's spirit from his petrified body and he is summoned by Aaravos to defend him from the other Archdragons. However, when faced with the possibility of killing his own son, Avizandum recovers his mind and helps in destroying Aaravos' mortal form before the sun rises and destroys him.
- Queen Zubeia (voiced by Nicole Oliver) was an Archdragon of the Sky and Queen of the Dragons, who previously ruled alongside Avizandum. She was the mate of Avizandum and the mother of Azymondias. She resided at the Storm Spire, but falls into a deep sleep after Avizandum's death and the presumed death of her unborn child, only awakening months later when she is reunited with him. Having been present when Aaravos was imprisoned, she understood how dangerous a threat he posed to humans, elves, and dragons alike. After having rescued Callum and Rayla from corrupted Banthers in the great library in Lux Aurea, she becomes infected with dark magic until Mukho later cures her. She later sacrifices her life at the side of her mate's spirit to destroy Aaravos' mortal form.
- Sol Regem, also known as Anak Arao, (voiced by Adrian Hough) was the ancient Archdragon of the Sun and former King of the Dragons. Over one thousand years before the beginning of the series, he was blinded by the dark mage Ziard, and in retaliation, he destroyed the human city of Elarion. Following this, the continent of Xadia was split in two and he was forced to step down as king. Now with a strong hatred for humans, he roamed The Border for hundreds of years, protecting Xadia from any humans who attempt to cross. He is later sought out by Karim and Pharos, who hoped to restore his vision using a Sun Seed and see him become King once again. It is instead used to restore Sol Regem's wings and he attacks Katolis with Pharos riding him. After destroying the city, he is confronted by Aaravos, who had possessed Pharos and succumbs to his wounds received while attacking the city.
- Pyrrah is a young female Sun Dragon who is saved by Callum when he uses dark magic for the first time. In the two years following the Battle of the Storm Spire, she has become a close ally of Zubeia.
- Squeaky, formerly known as Scarmaker, is a young female Earth Dragon from the Uncharted Forest who Soren befriends.
- Rex Igneous (voiced by Ben Cotton) was the Archdragon of the Earth who slumbered beneath the mountain Umber Tor. Having been present when Aaravos was imprisoned, he had since guarded the map that leads to his prison that is engraved onto one of Rex Igneous' fangs. His lair is later infiltrated by Callum, Rayla, Ezran, and Soren seeking the map, but Viren and Claudia retrieve it first before fleeing. When Aaravos brings about eternal night, Rex Igneous attempts to stop him but is killed by the shade of Avizandum.
- Domina Profundis (voiced by Jennifer Hale) was the Archdragon of the Ocean who protected all creatures that live within the sea. Having been present when Aaravos was imprisoned, she was believed to have guarded information regarding the whereabouts of Aaravos' prison. Seeking to stop Viren and Claudia from freeing Aaravos, she is summoned by Ezran and Zubeia who enquired about the location of Aaravos' prison. Although she was ultimately unaware of its location, she instead informed them of the prison's true nature as being held within a large pearl. When Aaravos brings about eternal night, Domina Profundis lays down her life shielding her human and elven allies from the blast of dark magic released by the demise of Aaravos' mortal form.
- Luna Tenebris was an Archdragon of the Moon, and former Queen of the Dragons, having succeeded Sol Regem. Three centuries before the beginning of the series, she died under mysterious circumstances.
- Shirukah was an Archdragon who lived over three thousand years before the beginning of the series and killed the Startouch Elf Laurelion with her bite, but died in the process. One of her fangs was forged into the Nova Blade, a sword that would become one of the few means to kill a Startouch Elf's mortal form.

==== Animals ====
- Pip is Harrow's pet bird. Following Harrow's death, he escaped his cage and fled Katolis to an unknown location. At the end of the series, Pip is revealed to house King Harrow's soul.
- Ava is Ellis' three-legged wolf companion who was "healed" by Lujanne who granted her an illusionary fourth leg.
- Phoenix-Phoenix, more commonly known as Phoe-Phoe, is a Moon Phoenix attuned to Moon Magic and Lujanne's companion. Upon her initial death from exhaustion after transporting Ezran and Bait to the Storm Spire, she left behind a single ghostly feather that, like all Phoenixes, allowed her to later be reborn.
- Roberto, more commonly known as Berto, (voiced by Paula Burrows) is Villads' parrot companion and a crewmember of the Ruthless.
- Embertail is a Twin-Tailed Inferno-Tooth Tiger attuned to Sun Magic and Janai's mount.
- Aegis is a Twin-Tailed Inferno-Tooth Tiger attuned to Sun Magic and Amaya's mount gifted to her by Janai.
- Sea Legs is a Giant Hermit Crab attuned to Ocean Magic that acts as the warship for Finnegrin and his crew until he is replaced by Villads.
- Sneezles, Hat and Jellybug, known collectively as the Baitlings, are a trio of baby Glow Toads attuned to Sun Magic that Ezran rescues from Finnegrin to prevent them from being used to attract and catch Sea Leviathans. Sneezles befriends Callum and Rayla, Hat forms a connection with Soren, while Jellybug stays with Ezran and Bait.
- Aaron and Sam are a pair of Shimmercrow hatchlings attuned to Star Magic who are taken in by Terry after their mother is killed by Aaravos.

==== Miscellaneous ====
- The Magma Titan was a colossal giant made of molten lava and stone. Its heart was sought after by Viren who hoped to use it in a dark magic spell that would save the human kingdoms from an ongoing famine. Nine years before the beginning of the series, it was defeated by the combined forces of the kingdoms of Katolis and Duren. After Claudia and Aaravos invert the Moon Nexus and release the spirits trapped in the In-Between, the shade of the Magma Titan is released into the world but is later destroyed when the sun rises.
- The Being, also jokingly referred to as Sir Sparklepuff, was a part-human, part-Startouch Elf homunculus created by Aaravos that spawned from a cocoon spun by Aaravos' caterpillar-like familiar. It acted as a guide to lead a resurrected Viren, Claudia, and Terrestius to Aaravos' prison, by first taking them to Umber Tor to recover the map to Aaravos' prison from Rex Igneous. It later develops the ability to speak, but can only utter a single phrase, "blood of a child" and must be sacrificed to make Viren's resurrection permanent. Against Viren's wishes, Claudia performs the blood ritual and kills The Being to save her father. After Claudia and Aaravos invert the Moon Nexus and release the spirits trapped in the In-Between, the shade of The Being is released into the world but is later destroyed when the sun rises.
- Chert and Terbium (voiced by Mark Hildreth and Jason Simpson) are a pair of ancient Stone Giants who guard the entrance to Rex Igneous' mountain lair at Umber Tor.
- Elmer, formerly known as Deadwood, (voiced by Dave "Squatch" Ward) is a Wooden Golem who acts as Finnegrin's bodyguard and the first mate of his warship Sea Legs. He is later convinced by Soren to turn against his captain and embrace his more compassionate nature.
- Esmeray is an Ice Behemoth and the former companion of the Archdragon of the Moon, Luna Tenebris. Following Luna Tenebris' death, Esmeray began to conjure a perpetual ice storm in the area surrounding the Starscraper as she grieved her lost companion. Three hundred years later, tasked with slaying Esmeray as part of a prophecy, Rayla discovers Esmeray's identity and gives her a moon opal to help her regain her connection to the moon and the ice storm ceases.
