= Leola =

Leola may refer to:

== Places ==
- Leola, Arkansas
- Leola, Pennsylvania
- Leola, South Dakota
- Leola, Wisconsin
- Leola Marsh, Wisconsin

== People with the given name ==
- Leola Bell (1984-), Playboy Playmate of the Month February 2012
- Leola Brody (1922–1997), American baseball player
- Leola Isabel Freeman (1900–1989), American artist and gallery owner
- Leola Hall (1881–1930), American architect
- Leola Neal (1911–1995), Canadian psychologist
- Leola C. Robinson-Simpson (born 1944), American politician
- Leola Alicia Katherine Street (1911-2016), American educator, editor, and author
- Coot Grant (1893-1970), American singer and songwriter also known as Leola Wilson
- Janet Leola Langhart, (1941-), American television journalist and anchor
- Zatae Leola Longsdorff Straw (1866-1955), American physician and New Hampshire state representative

== Fiction ==
- Leola Staunton, a character in Robertson Davies' novel Fifth Business
- Leola, a character in the TV series The Dragon Prince and its sequel, The Dragon King

== Organizations ==
- Korp! Leola, Estonian student fraternity
