= Aaravos =

Fictional character in The Dragon Prince

- The Dragon Prince character
- Promotional still of Aaravos
- First appearance: "Echoes of Thunder" (narrator) "Smoke and Mirrors"
- Last appearance: "Nova"
- Created by: Aaron Ehasz; Justin Richmond
- Voiced by: Erik Todd Dellums

In-universe information
- Alias: The Fallen Star
- Species: Startouch Elf
- Title: Archmage
- Affiliation: Lord Viren (formerly); Claudia
- Weapon: Primal Magic; Dark Magic
- Children: Leola (daughter); The Being (via blood magic ritual)
- Nationality: Xadian

Aaravos is a fictional character who serves as the main antagonist of Netflix's animated fantasy television series The Dragon Prince. He is voiced by Erik Todd Dellums.

He is introduced as an ancient and mysterious Startouch Elf, an extremely rare race of elves connected to the magical energy of the stars. Trapped within a mysterious prison for around 300 years, Aaravos comes into contact with Lord Viren, and they eventually form a partnership to ensure Aaravos' long-awaited release from his undersea prison.

Following his appearance, Aaravos received a positive reception, with praise for Dellums' vocal performance, his relationship with Viren and later on Claudia, and his tragic backstory that revealed his true motivations behind his actions.

== Story ==
=== Background ===
Aaravos is one of the first elves to exist in Xadia, making him approximately 5,000 years old when the series begins. He is the only being able to master all six of the Primal Sources of elemental magic, as well as "the seventh source" of dark magic, which he bestowed onto humanity as a gift. Ziard, the human who received this gift, would refuse to give up his newfound power before being killed by Sol Regem, the Archdragon of the Sun, who would then destroy the human city of Elarion. Following this, the continent of Xadia was divided in two, with humans banished to the Western half of the continent.

Over seven centuries later, Aaravos conspires against the other elves and the dragons, ultimately causing every crisis the world has suffered, including the death of Aditi, Queen of the Sunfire Elves. After his crimes are exposed by the Orphan Queen, he is soon imprisoned inside a hidden undersea prison in the form of a giant pearl and placed beneath the Sea of the Castout by an alliance of elves and Archdragons. He is supervised through an enchanted mirror by the King of the Dragons, Avizandum, while the Archdragons of Earth and the Ocean, each hold a clue to the whereabouts and true nature of Aaravos' prison.

==== Patience ====
Aaravos recounts the story of how the very first humans had feared that the Stars had forsaken them and that they would pay for their transgressions. Since then the original humans had learned patience and learned how to hold pure fire in their own hands without getting burned. However, humanity was not to discover that patience was never a lesson from the Stars but rather from within their own hearts. Feeling humanity's plight, Aaravos admitted that he would make the Stars pay dearly for their endless arrogance and complete disregard for humanity's mortality.

==== Ripples ====
Aaravos explains how one single ripple growing into many could affect certain events in the world with the simple touch of a human hand alone. The short story then reveals how he vows to enact his bitter vengeance on his fellow Startouch elves upon his release by having them fall just as he had.

=== Book One: Moon (2018) ===
Aaravos narrates the prologue of the series premiere, explaining how humanity was banished from Xadia by the elves and dragons.

=== Book Two: Sky (2019) ===
When Viren finally manages to see into the library-like realm behind the magic mirror, a cloaked Aaravos comes into view. Viren realizes the elf cannot see him, but Aaravos eventually casts a spell allowing him to see Viren as well. Because they cannot hear each other, Aaravos gestures to Viren to gather specific items for a blood ritual of communication and servitude. Before the last step, however, Viren stops and leaves to think, unsure if he can trust such a mysterious being. Meanwhile, Callum learns that the cube his father led him to find originally belonged to Aaravos. After Viren's failed attempt to rally the other kingdoms, he follows through with the elf's instructions. The spell teleports from inside the mirror a small purple caterpillar, which crawls to Viren's ear and allows the two to speak.

After some convincing, Aaravos finally introduces himself. When Viren tries searching for information on Aaravos in the royal library, the words magically disappear from the scrolls and books. Viren demands to know what's going on and why he should trust the mysterious elf; Aaravos replies that he shouldn't at the moment. When Viren admits that the leaders of the other human kingdoms refuse to listen, Aaravos agrees to help him. First, he has Viren chant a dark spell to create ghostly versions of elven assassins to terrorize the other four monarchs into taking a stand against Xadia. When castle guards try to arrest him, Aaravos casts sun spells to help Viren fight them. Upon being surrounded and outnumbered, Aaravos orders Viren to stop and the latter reluctantly obliges. Aaravos promises to stay with Lord Viren to provide further advice and magical knowledge, and the caterpillar crawls into his ear.

=== Book Three: Sun (2019) ===
In a dungeon, Aaravos encourages a despairing Viren not to give up. When Viren's children visit him, and Claudia demands to know why he ordered Soren to kill Callum and Ezran, Aaravos warns Viren that an honest answer will cost him her loyalty, thus subtlety manipulating him into deceiving her. With two monarchs dead and a third severely injured, the latter's son, Prince Kasef, works with Viren to wage war on Xadia. Aaravos's caterpillar weaves silk over Viren's right eye, allowing him to see an apparition of Aaravos's true form. That evening, Viren declares to his subjects that they will march on Xadia. On the way to Xadia, Aaravos asks how Viren slayed the Dragon King, and Viren tells the tale, delighting the Startouch elf. Aaravos reveals that Avizandum is the one who trapped him in the magic mirror, though he doesn't know where his prison is because the Dragon King never told him.

As part of the plan to conquer Xadia, Aaravos has Viren enter Lux Aurea, the home of the Sunfire elves. Queen Khessa's attempts to purify Viren of the essence dark magic gives him and Aaravos access to the Sunforge, the very source of all of their solar magic. Aaravos's caterpillar (now considerably larger) bites the Sunfire High Priest, corrupting not only the latter's Sun staff, but the Sunforge as well. Due to the bite, Aaravos is able to possess the body of the High Priest, and sadistically whispers to Queen Khessa the fate of her grandmother, Queen Aditi, before disintegrating her into ash with a mere touch of his finger.

Using the tainted Sunfire Staff, Viren transforms his soldiers into aggressive lava monsters with enhanced strength. As they clash with the elf-human alliance at the base of Storm Spire Mountain, Viren uses the distraction to ascend to the peak, where Aaravos's caterpillar (now the size of a snake) chants a spell to harvest the Dragon Prince's power for Viren. Before the spell can be completed, Rayla tackles Viren and Aaravos over the Spire's edge. Callum rescues her, but Viren falls to his death, Aaravos separating from him mid-descent. Claudia finds and revives Viren with her dark magic, and subsequently reveals Aaravos's caterpillar has entered a cocoon, metamorphosing into something else.

=== Book Four: Earth (2022) ===
Aaravos continues to set his release in motion by using resurrected Lord Viren and his dark mage daughter Claudia as his pawns, with his caterpillar familiar, now an elf-like homunculus, guiding them to the clues that will lead to his prison.

After learning of Aaravos's impending return from Ibis, a Sky Mage and her liaison, Queen Zubeia reveals to Callum, Rayla, Ezran and Soren that Aaravos was originally loved and respected by all Xadians until it was discovered by the human known as the Orphan Queen, Ezran's paternal ancestor, that he had orchestrated several major events including the death of Luna Tenebris, the Queen of the Dragons, and Aditi, the Queen of the Sunfire Elves. Working together, four Archdragons, consisting of Avizandum, Zubeia, Rex Igneous and Domina Profundis, worked with the elves and together they outwitted Aaravos, trapping him in a magical prison, which Aaravos is not aware of its location.

After returning to the enchanted mirror, Aaravos makes brief contact with Callum, Ezran, Rayla, and Soren, utilizing dark magic to take control of Callum's body to communicate. He mocks the group, reminding each of their own weaknesses and insecurities, and believes they do not stand a chance against him. He then destroys the mirror, preventing any further direct communication.

=== Book Five: Ocean (2023) ===
Aaravos briefly appears in Queen Janai's recurring nightmare, where she sees herself instead of her elder sister Khessa being killed by him, and he informs her of how he had killed her great-grandmother, Queen Aditi, by swallowing her.

Having sensed Claudia's arrival, Aaravos appears to Viren on the final day before his resurrection spell wears off, bringing his consciousness inside Aaravos' prison. He instructs Viren to sacrifice the Being in order to make the resurrection spell permanent, but Lord Viren refuses (having seen through the Startouch elf's manipulations) and accepts his impending death by sunrise.

=== Book Six: Stars (2024) ===
Aaravos' origins and his motives for causing the war are established. It is revealed that he had a daughter named Leola, whom he cherished beyond his own life. One fateful day, the archdragon Sol Regem exposes Leola who accidentally introduced magic to humans, prompting the Startouch Elf council to sentence her to death for disrupting the cosmic order, in hopes of maintaining it. Despite Aaravos' protests and his offer to give his own life for hers, the council would grant him death alongside his daughter as their only mercy. Aaravos was forced to watch in horror as his daughter was stripped of her mortal form but chose to live as a result. Mournful of his daughter's death, Aaravos settled at the crater where she fell and wept for a hundred years. His tears flooded the crater, inadvertently forming the Sea of the Castout, where he was later imprisoned. The Merciful One approaches a grieving Aaravos and advises him that every being is stardust, held together by love for an instant, which causes him to resent the council.

Aaravos initiated his plan by teaching dark magic to the human mage Ziard and giving him his staff which caught Sol Regem's attention. He also goaded Sol Regem by tricking him into killing his mate, Aithne Solaire, thus directing his rage against the humans banished from Xadia. When he was eventually exposed for his crimes centuries later, he was imprisoned instead of being executed, as the essence of a Startouch Elf, which is the very stars themselves taking mortal form, is truly immortal. Despite his confinement, Aaravos managed to reach out to human mages who would use dark magic, making them susceptible to his influence and exploiting their feelings of love for his revenge.

After tricking Callum into swapping the prison with a decoy, Aaravos sets his plan in motion by using Pharos, whom he infected early during Khessa's death, to manipulate Karim to declare war against his sister Janai and using Sol Regem as an ally. They successfully stole a sacred sunseed and used it to heal Sol Regem's wings, as the Archdragon is eager to fight without his eyesight, and Pharos would guide him. Instead of joining the battle, Aaravos, through Pharos, lures Sol Regem to attack Katolis leaving him injured. Before succeeding in his revenge, Aaravos reveals to Sol Regem the circumstances surrounding the death of his mate Aithne Solaire causing Sol Regem to lash out in anger and choke to death on Pharos' body. After Viren, who Claudia resurrected, had atoned for his past misdeeds by sacrificing his life to protect the people of Katolis from Sol Regem, Aaravos approaches Claudia to use her as his new pawn to ensure his release. She successfully performs the required ritual, and Aaravos is freed and restored to his mortal form.

=== Book Seven: Dark (2024) ===
Shortly after being freed, Aaravos assumes a human form and joins together with Claudia as she seeks to invert the Moon Nexus in order to bring back Viren, but Aaravos secretly intends to bring about Eternal Night by unleashing the spirits of the In-Between onto the world and corrupting the sun. As they need a primal moonstone to invert the Moon Nexus, they went to the abandoned home of Viren's mentor Kpp'ar to search for a map to the Garden of Innocence. As only beings of true heart can see the map's details, Aaravos and Claudia decided to use Terrestrius to get to the Garden of Innocence. Reaching their destination, Aaravos and Terrestrius helped Claudia in creating the primal moonstone. As part of his plan to access the In-Between at the Moon Nexus, Aaravos kills a mother Shimmercrow by placing her in a sack and letting the bird suffocate to death, horrifying Terrestrius. Aaravos then reveals to him that Claudia has deceived and manipulated him into getting them to the Garden of Innocence, which is actually a cemetery for dead unicorns, causing Terrestrius to realize that Claudia had been using him throughout and runs off.

While traveling to the moon Nexus, when Claudia expressed doubt that her father might not be in the In-Between, Aaravos, in turn, confesses that he seeks to corrupt the sun to bring about Eternal Night as revenge for Leola's death. Though the two encountered resistance from Soren, Terrestrius, and Lujanne (who had assumed the form of Claudia and Soren's mother Lissa), they successfully invert the Moon Nexus, releasing the spirits of the dead in the process. After his human form was destroyed, Aaravos reverts back into his true form in Katolis but soon faced an ambush from Ezran and the army of Katolis, as they had been earlier warned by Terrestrius of Aaravos's return and of his plot to bring about Eternal Night. Using fire ruby ballista bolts, they managed to bring Aaravos down before chaining him to the ground. When confronted by Ezran over his actions, Aaravos reveals to him of the Nova Blade, a magical sword that can supposedly kill a Startouch Elf, but didn't reveal the fact that it is only capable of destroying their mortal forms. Having been forged from the fang of the late Archdragon Shiruakh, the Nova Blade was given to the Oprhan Queen, who, despite being given the chance to use it to defeat Aaravos, has him imprisoned instead.

As Aaravos had actually been stalling Ezran until the sun sets, this allowed a horde of shades to overwhelm the Katolian forces and free Aaravos. Reaching Lux Aurea, he kills Karim by crushing him in his hand before seizing the Sun Forge's Sun Orb and using it to corrupt the sun, bringing forth the Eternal Night. He is soon engaged by the Archdragons Zubeia, Rex Igneous, and Domina Profundis but defends himself by summoning the shade of Avizandum, now a puppet of Aaravos and he kills Igneous. Callum attempted to imprison Aaravos in one of Viren's coins but at the same time, Ezran attempted to strike him down with the Nova Blade. Before either of them could reach him, Zubeia brings Avizandum back to his senses and they overwhelm Aaravos, who sends Claudia to the Storm Spire through a portal for her safety. After the Sun Orb was destroyed, which brought an end to the Eternal Night, Zubeia and Avizandum sacrificed themselves to destroy Aaravos' mortal form, which triggers a massive explosion that killed the Archdragons while destroying Lux Aurea. Sometime after, the Humans and Elves began making preparations for Aaravos's return once his stars realign in seven years time, which will allow him to materialize in a new mortal form.

==== The Silver Queen ====
Seven years after his defeat at the Sun Forge, Aaravos has a reencounter with the Merciful One, who convinces him to let go of his hatred, understanding of how Leola had been mistreated but insists that his quest for vengenace cannot bring her back. Aaravos agrees to move on but then reveals that Claudia is calling to him and that he'll return for her.

== Development ==
=== Characterization and progression ===
Aaravos is described by the series' creators as a complicated character with a good side and a bad side. He is described as "mysterious and charismatic," as well as "secretive, yet charming." He is also stated by the creators to be manipulative in a "very slow and seductive way", and the fact he is able to manipulate a person as "brilliant" as Viren is a great example of this.

Regarding the character's fascination with humans and the mysterious gifts he shared with them, Ehasz stated that it is partly out of genuine kindness and generosity, and partly out of a desire to be "worshipped" and "revered."

Despite his secretive and manipulative nature, Aaravos has stated that he never tells a lie, which both Ehasz and Richmond have confirmed, stating that he is "manipulative without being deceptive" and "always tells the truth."

=== Powers and abilities ===
In the world of The Dragon Prince, only magical creatures can use magic, as they have magical energy within them. All magic originates from one of six Primal Sources: the Moon, the Sun, the Sky, the Earth, the Ocean and the Stars. As a Startouch Elf, Aaravos is naturally connected to the stars, but due to being a "fallen" member of his race, he can only access a fraction of his former power. He has also somehow mastered the other five Primal Sources, and his abilities related to them are seemingly limitless. Because of this, he is referred to as an "Archmage." An example of Aaravos's mastery is that he is able to perform spells without speaking the required incantations.

Aaravos is also a master of Dark magic, a corrupted form of magic that is fueled by the essence of magical creatures. Aaravos can perform a dark magic spell without speaking an incantation, but at least once says the spell he wishes to perform in reverse. He knows a number of spells which Viren, an expert in the practice himself, does not.

Aaravos has a familiar, a purple caterpillar-like creature that is not native to the world of Xadia. It heavily resembles a real-life Dragonhead caterpillar, which is the larval form of the butterfly Polyura athamas. Starting in the second season, Aaravos uses this caterpillar to communicate with Viren by channeling his voice through it. He can also perform spells through the form and channel them through Viren's staff to help him defeat enemies. The caterpillar evolves with the ongoing story; initially the size of a regular caterpillar, it grows to the size of a snake throughout the third season, and enters metamorphosis in the season finale.

== Reception ==
Aaravos's character and Dellums' performance has been generally praised by critics and fans. Particular attention has been given to Aaravos's interactions and relationship with the human dark mage Viren. The Daily Dot's Gavia Baker-Whitelaw called his relationship with Viren "intriguing".

Praise continued into the third season. Hypable praised Aaravos and Viren's relationship and the contrast between the goals and actions of these two characters and those of Callum, Rayla, and Ezran. Nelson also reacted positively to the relationship between the two characters and how Aaravos "preys on Viren's ambition and desperation to fulfill his own mysterious, malevolent goals". Kain also took note of how Aaravos was contributing to Viren's descent into villainy.
