= Leola Neal =

Canadian psychologist

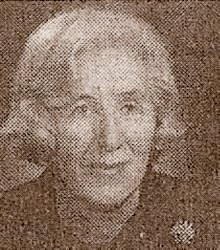
- Leola Neal, Canadian psychologist
- Born: 1911; Merlin, Ontario, Canada
- Died: 1995 (aged 84)
- Education: University of Western Ontario
- Occupation: psychologist
- Board member of: Canadian Psychological Association

Leola Neal (1911–1995) was a Canadian psychologist born in Merlin, Ontario. Neal taught at the University of Western Ontario where she was appointed the Dean of Women, and was the first female president of the Ontario Psychological Association and the second woman to serve on the board of the Canadian Psychological Association. Neal's work helped promote undergraduate psychology curriculums and define standards for psychological counselling.

== Academic life ==
Neal's family moved to London, Ontario so that Neal could attend the University of Western Ontario, where illness forced her to move from the honors program to the general program. Her academic excellence caught the eye of Dr. Doug Wilson, who gave her the opportunity to do graduate work. She was one of three students to receive Master of Arts from the school in 1935. She went on to teach introductory psychology, experimental psychology, statistics and various other courses at the university. As a psychologist, Neal conducted studies focusing on schizophrenia, mental illness, and psychological testing, in addition to clinical and educational studies. Later, around the time World War II broke out, she received both a Reuben Wells Leonard Scholarship and the Northway Fellowship, and attended the University of Toronto. Her success in academics lead to her being appointed the Dean of Women at the University of Western Ontario and the first female president of the Ontario Psychological Association, being only the second woman to serve on the board of the Canadian Psychological Association.

== Psychological studies ==
In 1947, Neal worked on a study called The First Course in Psychology in Canadian Universities that investigated what could be done to improve the teaching of psychology courses. The study was conducted in response to a movement to expand the field of psychology and produce more-knowledgeable psychology students following the end of World War II. The study was conducted by sending questionnaires to colleges and universities, where it was measured how many introductory courses were offered, how many classroom demonstrations were conducted, and other course activities. As a result, it was discovered that there was a minimal number of course activities provided in many colleges and universities. After questioning many groups of individuals it was preferred that institutions provide such course activities as they were deemed beneficial and essential to positive student development. This study by Neal is one of the many that demonstrates how she contributed to the world of psychology as a mentor and psychologist.

Neal's study The Psychologist as a Counselor investigated the benefits of having a psychologist as a counselor. In this study, she communicated the need to set a clear definition of the word 'counselor'. Investigations done as a procedure of this study revealed that many individuals who identify themselves as psychologists in the A.P.A. (American Psychological Association) have degrees and a professional background which separates them from those who have claimed to be licensed counselors despite receiving little-to-no training. Neal then clarifies that counseling is thought of as a form of mental therapy and that it has three forms: vocational, personal, and educational. There are times when these fields overlap, and clients are confused about which type of counseling psychologist they should pursue. This also applies to the counselor, who must determine whether or not he/she can effectively deal with the issues of the client. Neal's research identified the requirements of a counselor, and helped individuals understand that if customers do not receive a properly-trained individual in the field of counseling, severe psychological damage could be inflicted.
