= Lord Viren =

- The Dragon Prince character
- Promotional still of Viren
- First appearance: "Echoes of Thunder"
- Last appearance: "We All Fall Down"
- Created by: Aaron Ehasz; Justin Richmond
- Designed by: Caleb Thomas
- Voiced by: Jason Simpson

In-universe information
- Species: Human
- Title: Lord
- Position: High Mage of Katolis (formerly); King of Katolis (formerly)
- Affiliation: Kingdom of Katolis (formerly); Aaravos (formerly)
- Weapon: Dark Magic; Staff of Ziard; Sky Primal Stone (formerly)
- Spouse: Lissa (ex-wife)
- Children: Soren (son); Claudia (daughter); The Being (via blood magic ritual)
- Nationality: Katolian

Lord Viren is a fictional character from the Netflix animated fantasy television series The Dragon Prince. The character was created by the show's co-creators Aaron Ehasz and Justin Richmond, and is voiced by Jason Simpson.

Viren is introduced as the High Mage of Katolis, the best friend and closest advisor of King Harrow, and the father of Soren and Claudia. A skilled practitioner of dark magic, he uses his abilities to help King Harrow and the kingdom of Katolis. Following King Harrow's assassination and the disappearance of the princes Callum and Ezran, Viren assumes rulership of Katolis. In the second season, he fails to unite the other four human kingdoms against the elves and dragons, and allies with Aaravos, a mysterious Startouch Elf who communicates with him via a magic mirror that previously belonged to King Avizandium. Their partnership continued in the show's third season, in which they ally with three of the four other human kingdoms to invade Xadia.

Viren was one of the first two characters to be created for The Dragon Prince alongside his son Soren, who early in development was split into Soren and Viren's daughter Claudia. Despite making Viren the story's villain, Ehasz and Richmond wrote him as a "flawed [and] complicated" pragmatist because they felt this moral ambiguity made the character rounder and more interesting, providing better storytelling opportunities.

Critics gave Viren positive reviews and many praised the character as one of the show's best, and his ambiguous morality has often been the subject of attention. Many critics said it makes him a compelling character and villain, and praised the show for encouraging its viewers to ask whether Viren's actions are justified. His relationships with other characters, such as his children and King Harrow, have also been praised for humanizing him. From the second season onward, Viren's interactions and relationship with Aaravos have also been commended.

== Storylines ==
=== Background ===
Viren was born on April 11. A member of the Kingdom of Katolis' court and master of dark magic, he is King Harrow's best friend. In the novelization of the first season, it is revealed that Viren's ex-wife is named Lissa. The second season's novelization introduces Viren's former mentor, Kpp'Ar. With his Del Barran wife Lissa, he had a son Soren and a daughter Claudia. Viren and Lissa often argued over his use of dark magic and eventually divorced. Soren chose to stay with Viren, as did Claudia.

Nine years before the beginning of the series, Queens Annika and Neha of Duren asked Katolis for help with a famine. Knowing Katolis' reserves could not feed both nations, Viren planned to go to Xadia and kill a Magma Titan, using its heart for a ritual to boost Katolis' and Duren's crop yields. The expedition was successful, but the Dragon King, Avizandum killed the queens of Duren and Queen Sarai of Katolis.

Four months before Harrow's assassination, Viren gathers materials for a spell to kill the Dragon King and persuades Harrow to accompany him. They find the Dragon King at his lair and turn him to stone. Realizing his mate Zubeia has laid an egg, Viren sets out to find and destroy it. Most of the Dragonguard abandon their posts, leaving only Rayla's parents Tiadrin and Lain. Viren traps them in ice, and Tiadrin persuades him to spare the egg by appealing to his need for powerful ingredients for dark magic spells. As a token of "gratitude", Viren traps both their spirits inside cursed coins, and takes the egg and an enchanted mirror from the lair.

==== Puzzle House ====
Nine years before the beginning of the series, Lord Viren has recently become the royal High Mage of Katolis, replacing his mentor Kpp'Ar, who was recently vanished under mysterious circumstances. He is shown to have been displeased at his eight-year-old daughter's consistent mishaps due to her determination to fully understand and master dark magic, as he does. When Claudia is summoned to the Throne Room for her troubles in the castle, King Atticus (Ezran's paternal grandfather) has her practice in Lord Viren's hidden chambers instead, which she agrees to.

Unaware that his daughter had been eavesdropping, High Mage Viren informed the King that he was fine as was expected of him, given that his nine-year-old son was terminally ill and that his wife Lissa had recently left him shortly after Soren was magically healed some time ago. He then told His Majesty that he had no luck in finding out what became of his mentor, then anyone else did. He then explained that the maze-like residence of Kpp’Ar was just as incomprehensible as it ever was, but that the former High Mage had a surprise for Soren and Claudia. A few days later, Lord Viren came to his daughter's room to see her pondering over a seemingly blank piece of parchment, which he was considering discarding. He gives Claudia back the medium-sized spellbook that Kpp’Ar had left her, and that whatever she done to it was permanent. He hugs Claudia and promises to teach her more advanced dark magics, believing she is now past the basics, but only in his hidden chambers together.

=== Book One: Moon (2018) ===
Alerted by the Crownguard Marcos, Lord Viren tells King Harrow of Katolis that Moonshadow Elf assassins are planning to kill him to avenge the Dragon King and the supposed destruction of the Dragon Prince's egg. Viren presents a two-headed Soulfang Serpent, a cobra-like snake that can drain people's souls, which he proposes to use to switch King Harrow's spirit with that of another and save his life. King Harrow refuses; when Viren says any of his subjects would be willing to die for him, King Harrow asks Viren if he'd be willing to sacrifice himself. Shaken by Harrow's words, Viren decides to sacrifice himself, but before he can explain himself, King Harrow misunderstands. King Harrow demands Viren kneel and "learns his place"; Viren grudgingly complies.

With King Harrow dead and the princes missing, Viren prepares to take the throne but news of the princes' survival interrupts the coronation. After a confrontation with the princes' deaf aunt General Amaya, Viren imprisons her sign-language interpreter Commander Gren and sends his own children to find the princes. Viren tells Soren to come back with news that the Princes' have perished, hinting he should kill them. He gives Claudia a secret mission to retrieve the egg at all costs, even Soren's life. Later, Viren visits Runaan, the leader of the assassins, whom he offers to free in exchange for information about the mirror that was found in the Dragon King's lair and threatens a fate worse than death if Runaan yields nothing useful. Runaan recognizes the mirror but refuses to reveal its nature. As punishment, Viren uses dark magic to trap Runaan's spirit inside a cursed coin.

=== Book Two: Sky (2019) ===
In a council meeting, Lord Viren argues that the five human kingdoms are in danger and that they must call a summit of the Pentarchy, the five human kingdoms. Opeli and the other members refuse because only a monarch has the authority to do so. Viren sends the scrolls calling for a summit by stealing the royal seal and threatening the Crow Master. Viren realizes complete darkness can activate the magic mirror, which reveals an unoccupied but lavish room. After some time, a cloaked elf enters. Viren gathers that the elf cannot see him, but the Startouch Elf casts a spell allowing him to see Viren. Because they cannot hear each other, the elf gestures to Viren to gather specific items. Before the last step, Viren's suspicion prompts him to stop and state he needs time to think.

At the Pentarchy summit, Viren pretends to be Katolis' regent and says Xadia will attack the human kingdoms. Three of the other four leaders state they will back Viren if the decision is unanimous. The last, the young Queen Aanya, who has inherited Duren from her mothers, chides her fellow monarchs for hedging and says while Katolis has saved thousands in Duren from starvation, she cannot repay that debt by sending millions to die. Her effective veto foils Viren's plans. When Viren returns from the summit, the council exposes his treachery and strips him of his title and power. With no other options, Viren follows the elf's instructions. From inside the mirror, the spell teleports a caterpillar that crawls onto Viren's ear and allows the two to speak. The elf finally introduces himself as Aaravos. When Viren tries searching for information on Aaravos in the library, it magically disappears from the scrolls and books. Viren demands to know what is going on and why Viren should trust him; Aaravos says he should not at the moment. When Viren says the leaders of the other human kingdoms refuse to listen, Aaravos agrees to help him. He makes Viren chant a spell to create spectral versions of the elven assassins to terrorize the other monarchs. When castle guards try to arrest Viren, Aaravos casts spells to help Viren fight them, but when he is surrounded and outnumbered, Viren stops on Aaravos' command. Aaravos promises to stay with Viren, and the caterpillar crawls into his ear.

=== Book Three: Sun (2019) ===
Lord Viren, languishing in a dungeon, heeds Aaravos' counsel not to give up. When his children visit him, he learns the egg has hatched. When they ask about their secret missions, Viren tries to save face in front of Claudia by gaslighting Soren. To Soren's displeasure, Claudia believes Viren's assertion he did not order Soren to kill the princes. Two monarchs have died, and King Ahling is seriously injured. Ahling's son Prince Kasef works with Viren to wage war on Xadia. The caterpillar weaves silk over Viren's right eye, allowing him to see an apparition of Aaravos just as Ezran abdicates in favor of Viren. That evening, Viren tells his subjects they will march on Xadia. Respecting Ezran's last wish as king, Viren allows those who do not want to fight to leave and brands them cowards.

On the way to Xadia, Aaravos asks Viren how he slew the Dragon King; Viren tells the tale. As part of the plan to conquer Xadia, Viren enters Lux Aurea, the home of the Sunfire Elves. Queen Khessa's attempts to purify Viren of his dark magic give him and Aaravos access to the Sun Forge, the source of their power, and they corrupt and seize it. Using it, Viren transforms Kasef and the soldiers into aggressive, strong beings. They clash with the elf-human alliance at the base of the Storm Spire. Viren climbs to the peak, where he attempts to harvest the Dragon Prince's power for himself, but before the spell can be completed, Rayla tackles Viren over the cliff edge. Callum rescues Rayla with by conjuring wings, but Viren falls to his death. Claudia finds Viren's broken, lifeless body and revives him with dark magic albeit with great difficulty, taking two long years, and together they watch Aaravos' caterpillar pupate inside its cocoon undergoing metamorphosis.

==== Through the Moon ====
About two weeks after his death, he is seen in nightmares Rayla keeps having of him imprisoning everyone she loves, from her parents Lain and Tiadrin to Runnan, to Callum. While in the world between the worlds of the living and the dead, Rayla glimpses his slumbering form within the cocoon made to preserve his lifeless body.

=== Book Four: Earth (2022) ===
Viren, now resurrected, learns that he has been dead for two years since his defeat at the Battle of the Storm Spire, and reunites with his now eighteen-year-old daughter Claudia and meets her Earthblood elf boyfriend, Terrestrius but is not thrilled with his daughter's decision. Having misgivings about Aaravos' promise to sustain his new life permanently once he has his freedom, Viren attempts to explain that he is no longer certain whether he wants to live again and spend his last thirty days alive with Claudia. Refusing to let her father go again, Claudia assured him that she would take care of him from now on.

Being told that he had left his dark magic staff on the Storm Spire's pinnacle, Viren began to experience flashes of post-traumatic stress from his last encounter with the Moonshadow Elf Rayla. Once Claudia retrieves the staff, he tells her to hold it for him, now fearful of accepting the insatiable temptations of dark magic.

As the days pass and "the Being" leads his group to the first piece of the ancient puzzles to Aaravos' whereabouts by stopping at Umber Tor to see the Archdragon of Earth, Viren is reunited with his estranged son. When Claudia succeeds in stealing the map leading to Aaravos' prison, Viren approaches the staff hesitantly but touches it for the first time in two years, causing him to become swayed by its dark powers again. He runs out of Rex Igneous' lair upon glimpsing Rayla, who previously killed him. Outside in the sunlight's warmth, his eyes glow blue-white and his face is wrinkled with the thoroughly draining effects the dark magical features have on his body and mind yet again.

=== Book Five: Ocean (2023) ===
Having touched his staff for the first time in two years, he is overcome by its tempting dark powers once again, which immediately starts to take a renewed toll on his already conflicted psyche. He collapses and has a feverish nightmare of self-reflection while his physical self is carried through the Uncharted Forest by Claudia and Terrestrius. In this dream, Viren is confronted by painful memories of his own past regarding his lifelong obsession with dark magic and the ramifications his ambitions had caused over the years and begins to have misgivings about releasing Aaravos. Understanding the errors of his ways, he ultimately accepts his impending death.

=== Book Six: Stars (2024) ===
Viren wakes up a day after the deadline for his death. Overjoyed, he celebrates with Terrestrius before realizing Claudia performed the blood ritual with The Being to save him. Devastated, he leaves, heading for Katolis to turn himself in. At Katolis, he was immediately arrested by Ezran, who never forgave him for his past crimes, and has him locked up in the dungeon, which Viren does not protest. He ends up being fed by his son, Soren, and tries to explain himself and that he’s changed. However, Soren refused to hear or believe it, and the next day, a different guard comes with Viren’s food. Viren later writes a letter to Soren, explaining his past. However, when Soren comes back, he crumples up and burns the letter, deciding not to tell his son about it.

When the Archdragon Sol Regem attacks Katolis, Soren goes to Viren for help and they devise a plan to use dark magic to imbue every citizen of Katolis with fire immunity, allowing safe evacuation. When Viren reveals that the spell requires a human heart, Soren willingly offers his heart for it. Ultimately, Viren refuses, taking his own heart instead. Viren limps to a balcony overlooking the city where he performs the spell, shielding the citizens of Katolis but dying in the process. Sometime later, Claudia finds Viren's body and mourns his death before burying him.

=== Book Seven Dark (2024) ===
Having been freed from his prison, Aaravos attempts to convince Claudia that Viren's spirit may be trapped in the In-Between, a realm between life and death, where spirits remain who have unfinished business from when they were alive. They work together to create a new primal moonstone as part of Aaravos' plan to invert the Moon Nexus and free the spirits of the dead into the living world. Claudia comes to later realize that her father's spirit has passed on, as he had died saving the citizens of Katolis and redeeming himself, though she continues to aid Aaravos now that she is beyond redemption.

== Development ==
=== Concept and creation ===
According to series co-creator Aaron Ehasz, Viren was one of the first two characters to be created for The Dragon Prince, alongside his son Soren. In the first scene set in The Dragon Prince universe Ehasz wrote, a mage explains the differences between primal and dark magic to his child; the mage later became Viren and the child—Soren—was split into two characters: Claudia and Soren. According to co-creator Justin Richmond, Viren is named after a friend of Ehasz who only asked whether the character was "practical"; when told he was, he agreed to lend his name to the character.

Viren was designed by character designer Caleb Thomas, after he received descriptions of the character. During development, the crew changed the color of Viren's eyes from purple to gray because they had also given Rayla, an elf, purple eyes and wanted to avoid the implication Viren has elf ancestors.

Richmond said of Viren's morality and role as a villain: "the most interesting villains don’t think they're villains". He also stated the writers wrote Viren to have "shades of gray" because they wanted the characters, including the villains, to be complex, rounded, and fleshed out, allowing more complex and layered storytelling.

Viren was one of the three roles for which Jason Simpson auditioned; the others were Runaan and Aaravos. Simpson had initially wanted to play Runaan; he was disappointed to be cast as Viren but quickly realized Viren was a "once in a lifetime" role and liked the character's complexity.

=== Characterization and progression ===
Ehasz described Viren as a character who is "flawed [and] complicated", and stated his ambiguous morality made him fun to write. Regarding Viren's unscrupulous actions, methods, and use of dark magic, Ehasz stated, "people can do bad things for good reasons, or for what they think are good reasons". The website Polygon called Viren a pragmatist. Simpson stated Viren's pragmatism and "cross[ing] the line" came from being someone who "sees the end result, [and] knows he can [achieve it]", even through immoral actions. Simpson also described him as being driven to do what is right.

According to Ehasz, Viren wants to become a champion for humanity out of a desire to protect his kingdom and "do the right thing" but he also wants to "be great and recognized". Ehasz also said Viren believes only his role as a father, especially to Claudia, can challenge his desire to be a "great figure". In the show's third season, according to Ehasz, Viren becomes a more typical villain. Simpson also noted the change from the first two seasons, during which Viren "could always believe there was a reason [for his actions]". Despite this change, Ehasz thought Viren's character retained his layers and attributes this to Simpson's performance. Ehasz stated Simpson became more receptive to Viren's role in the third season after they discussed the direction the character would take in the following two seasons, which would reveal "some of [Viren's] complexities".

=== Powers and abilities ===
In the world of The Dragon Prince, only magical creatures can use primal magic because they have magical energy within them due to their arcanum. All magic originates from one of six Primal Sources: the Sun, the Moon, the Stars, the Earth, the Sky, and the Ocean. As a human, Viren lacks a connection to a Primal Source but can use dark magic to cast spells. Dark magic is performed by siphoning primal magical energy from magical creatures. Viren recites the spell he wishes to perform in reverse.

Overuse of dark magic has a negative impact on Viren's body. After performing a powerful spell that traps Runaan inside a coin, Viren's face becomes "cracked, dead-seeming, [and] ice-like". At one point, he performs a spell that involves the killing of a butterfly, which appears to reinvigorate him. According to Ehasz, Viren's appearance after using dark magic is his true appearance and the spell involving Sunray butterflies is similar to a "daily cosmetic ritual" he performs to appear normal.

== Reception ==
Viren's relationships have received praise: with his daughter Claudia (front) for humanizing him and with Aaravos (back) for his positive impact on his character arc.

Critics often praise Viren's character and role, describing him as complex and sympathetic. Heather Alexander of Kotaku described him as a far better villain than Fire Lord Ozai from Avatar: The Last Airbender. (Note: Aaron Ehasz had previously worked on Avatar: The Last Airbender as the head writer and co-executive producer.) Michal Schick of Hypable praised Viren's role in the first season as an antagonist with "nuanced and real" morality and motives rather than as an "unambiguous villain". Reviewing the second season, Caroline Cao of /Film praised Viren and the show's other humanized villains; she called Viren "tragic", and acknowledged season two expands on his moral ambiguities and "swerve[s] with the audience's expectations". Polygon's Samantha Nelson described him as a nuanced antagonist throughout the series and in a separate review, Petrana Radulovic and Cass Marshall described him as a "compelling villain". Forbes' Erik Kain also said Viren is a complicated and sympathetic character despite his "myriad of flaws".

Viren's relationship with King Harrow and especially with his children Claudia and Soren have also been praised for helping humanize the character. Alex Barasch of Slate described Viren's "fraught relationship" with Harrow as one of the most compelling aspects of the first season. Nelson, writing for The Verge, appreciated the way the second season uses flashbacks and his intention to prevent further tragedy to juxtapose Viren's genuine love for Harrow with "terrible things [he does] with his dark magic". IGN's David Griffin also said the season's flashbacks effectively display the complexity of Viren's character and make the audience question his morality. Radulovic and Marshall said one of Viren's most compelling traits is his relatability, noting that while his relationship with his children—especially Claudia—does not absolve him, his desire to "leave a legacy behind for his children [is] an empathetic motivation to his drastic deeds" helps humanize him. (Note: Polygon staff would also list Viren as one of their top 69 fictional crushes of the 2010s, singling out his relatability as one of his best elements.)

Starting with the second season, attention has been paid to Viren's interactions and relationship with the Startouch elf Aaravos. The Daily Dot's Gavia Baker-Whitelaw described Viren's storyline as one of the best in the second season and called his relationship with Aaravos "intriguing". Praise continued into the third season; Hypable praised the relationship and the contrast between the goals and actions of these two characters and those of Callum, Rayla, and Ezran. Nelson also reacted positively to the relationship between the two characters and the way Aaravos "preys on Viren's ambition and desperation to fulfill his own mysterious, malevolent goals". Erik Kain also took note of his relationship with Aaravos and its contribution to Viren's descent into villainy.
