= Leola Marsh Wildlife Area =

Protected Wildlife Area in Adams County, Wisconsin

- Leola Marsh
- IUCN category V (protected landscape/seascape)
- Location within Wisconsin Location within the United States
- Location: Adams, Wisconsin
- Nearest city: Hancock, WI
- Coordinates: 44°11′31″N 89°38′17″W
- Area: 1,875 acres (7.59 km^{2})
- Established: 1982
- Governing body: Wisconsin Department of Natural Resources

The Leola Marsh Wildlife Area is a 1,875 acres (759 ha) tract of protected land located in Adams County, Wisconsin, managed by the Wisconsin Department of Natural Resources. The Wildlife Area was founded at the same time as the Buena Vista Wildlife Area and the Rachel Carson National Wildlife Refuge, located in Portage County, Wisconsin and Cumberland County, Maine respectively.

== Leola Marsh ==
Although the master plan for both the Buena Vista Wildlife Area and Leola Marsh Wildlife Area was only set into motion in 1982, the Wisconsin Department of Natural Resources (DNR) had begun purchasing land for the project as early as 1956. As with the Buena Vista Wildlife Area, in the early 1900's irrigation efforts were undertaken to drain the two marsh areas, allowing for cultivation of cranberries, timber, and grazing land for cattle. The soil in the Wildlife Area is mostly muck and loamy sands.

== Flora and fauna ==
Of the 1,875 acres (759 ha) located within the Wildlife Area, in 47 of them black oak are prominent, and in 15 other, aspen can be found. In addition to these commonly found trees, there are a wide variety of vulnerable birds are known to populate the area, including the vesper sparrow, northern harrier, short-eared owl, whooping crane, and the greater prairie chicken, whose observed population in the Wildlife Area is the largest than anywhere else in the state.

The gray wolf and Blanding's turtle are also native to the area, along with the regal fritillary butterfly which is listed as a species of concern.
