= Erik Dellums =

American actor (born 1964)

Erik Todd Dellums
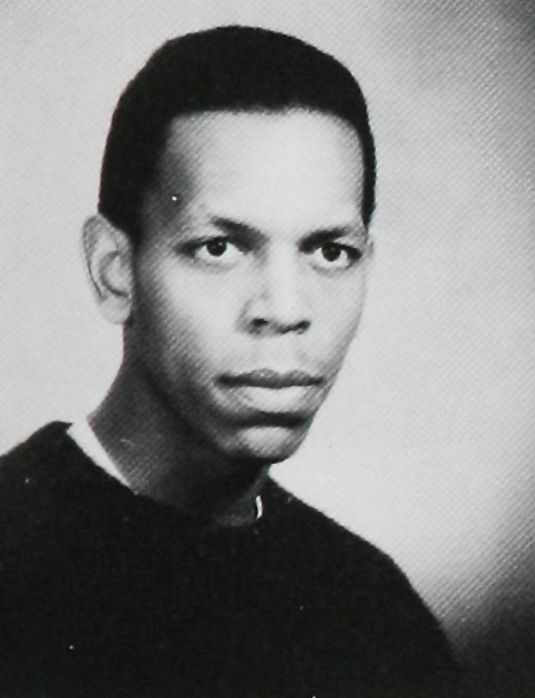
- Dellums in the Brown University yearbook, 1986
- Born: Erik Todd Dellums; September 21, 1964 (age 62); San Francisco, California, U.S.
- Education: Brown University (BS)
- Occupations: Actor, narrator
- Father: Ron Dellums
- Relatives: Piper Dellums (sister); C. L. Dellums (great-uncle)

Erik Todd Dellums (born September 21, 1964) is an American actor and narrator. He is known for playing the drug kingpin Luther Mahoney for two seasons on Homicide: Life on the Street. He also voiced the roles as the radio DJ Three Dog in the 2008 video game Fallout 3; Prince Arcann, Thexan, and Oggo in Knights of the Fallen Empire, the 2015 expansion to Star Wars: The Old Republic; and Aaravos in the animated Netflix series The Dragon Prince, for which he received an Emmy Award nomination.

== Early life and education ==
Erik Dellums was born in the San Francisco Bay Area in California and later moved to Washington, D.C. He is the son of Leola "Roscoe" Higgs Dellums, a lawyer, and Ron Dellums, the former U.S. representative from California and mayor of Oakland. His sister Piper Dellums is an author.

He earned a Bachelor of Science degree in political science from Brown University in 1986.

== Career ==
Dellums had minor appearances in several Spike Lee films early in his career, such as She's Gotta Have It (1986) and Do the Right Thing (1989). He was portrayed (as a child) by Travis Kyle Davis in a Disney Channel Original Movie entitled The Color of Friendship (2000), which was based on what happened when his family hosted a foreign exchange student from South Africa during the Apartheid era; Dellums had a cameo role as himself. He provided the voice of the character Koh the Face Stealer in the animated Nickelodeon series Avatar: The Last Airbender, as well as the narration for Key Constitutional Concepts, a documentary produced in 2006 by the Annenberg Foundation.

Dellums has had parts in television police dramas such as New York Undercover, Homicide: Life on the Street (in which he played drug kingpin Luther Mahoney), and The Wire (in which he played a medical examiner). He also played a doctor in one episode of Homeland. Dellums provided voice acting for the 2008 video game Fallout 3 as Three Dog. He provided the voice of Nazir, a character in the video game The Elder Scrolls V: Skyrim. Dellums narrates the Travel Channel series Mysterious Journeys, as well as the documentary television series How the Universe Works and NASA's Unexplained Files on the Science Channel. Dellums narrates the Science series The Planets – hosted by former astronaut Mike Massimino – which premiered in 2017 and was retitled The Planets and Beyond for its second season in 2018.

Dellums also reprised the role of Three Dog in the YouTube lore series by ShoddyCast, and he also performs the voice for Prince/Emperor Arcann in the game Star Wars: The Old Republic expansion Knights of the Fallen Empire and its sequel expansions Knights of the Eternal Throne and Onslaught. He's also the voice provider of the character Aaravos in the Netflix series The Dragon Prince.

Dellums' political and social writings on his personal blog gained notice in 2011, and his criticisms of the presidency of Barack Obama earned him guest appearances on Fox News.

== Filmography ==
=== Film ===
Year	Title	Role	Notes
1986	She's Gotta Have It	Dog #3	
1986	Good to Go	Bam-Bam	
1988	School Daze	Gammite Slim Daddy	
1989	Do the Right Thing	Customer in Pizzeria	Uncredited
1991	The Doors	Hairdresser at the Sullivan Show	
1997	Joe Joe Angel & the Dead Guy	The Man	
1998	Dr. Dolittle	Jeremy	
2000	BlackMale	Victor	
2003	Brother Outsider	Voice of Bayard Rustin	
2005	Bellclair Times	Devin	
2005	Camp D.O.A.	Watcher	
2008	Patsy	Harry	
2022	Almost Human: Rise of the Apes	Narrator	

=== Television ===
Year	Title	Role	Notes
1996–1998	Homicide: Life on the Street	Luther Mahoney	6 episodes
1998	New York Undercover	Mohammad	Episode: "Change, Change, Change"
1998	Walker, Texas Ranger	David 'Lucifer' Thompson	Episode: "The Children of Halloween"
1999	JAG	Charlie Lynch	Episode: "Goodbyes"
2000	NYPD Blue	Inez / Harold Carmichael	Episode: "A Hole in Juan"
2000	The Color of Friendship	Oliver	Television film
2001	Boycott	Bayard Rustin	Television film
2002–2004	The Wire	Dr. Randall Frazier	6 episodes
2005	Jonny Zero	Antoine Negasi	Episode: "Diamonds & Guns"
2005	Avatar: The Last Airbender	Koh	2 episodes
2012	Narrow Escapes of WWII	Narrator	4 episodes
2012–2021	How the Universe Works	Narrator	14 episodes
2013	Golden Boy	Pablo Vega	Episode: "Next Question"
2013	Homeland	Doctor Graham	Episode: "Tower of David"
2014–2017	NASA's Unexplained Files	Narrator	39 episodes
2015	Amnesia	Sargent Johnson	Episode: "Awakening"
2017	Great American Eclipse	Narrator	Television film
2017–2018	The Planet	Narrator	9 episodes
2017–2018	The Planets and Beyond	Narrator	17 episodes
2018–2024	The Dragon Prince	Aaravos	26 episodes

=== Video games ===
Year	Title	Role
2008	Fallout 3	Three Dog
2009	League of Legends	Nasus
2011	The Elder Scrolls V: Skyrim	Nazir
2015	Star Wars: The Old Republic: Knights of the Fallen Empire	Various voices
2015	Star Wars: The Old Republic: Knights of the Eternal Throne	Various voices
2017	The Elder Scrolls: Legends	Tyr
2017	Star Wars: The Old Republic: Onslaught	Various voices
2022	Star Wars: The Old Republic: Legacy of the Sith	

== Awards and nominations ==
Year	Organisation	Category	Project	Result	Ref.
2025	Children's and Family Emmy Awards	Outstanding Single Voice Role Performer	The Dragon Prince	Pending	
