= Rayla =

Fictional character from The Dragon Prince

- The Dragon Prince character
- Promotional still of Rayla
- First appearance: "Echoes of Thunder"
- Last appearance: "Nova"
- Created by: Aaron Ehasz; Justin Richmond
- Voiced by: Paula Burrows

In-universe information
- Species: Moonshadow Elf
- Position: Moonshadow Assassin (formerly); The Last Dragonguard
- Affiliation: Silvergrove; Kingdom of Katolis
- Weapon: Twin Butterfly Blades; Runann's Bowblade
- Significant other: Callum (boyfriend)
- Relatives: Tiadrin (mother); Lain (father); Runaan (foster guardian); Ethari (foster guardian)
- Nationality: Xadian

Rayla is a fictional character who serves as one of the main protagonists of the Netflix animated fantasy television series The Dragon Prince. She is voiced by Paula Burrows.

Rayla is introduced as a prodigy Moonshadow Elf assassin and the protégé of veteran assassin Runaan. Sent on a mission to avenge the death of the king of the dragons, she ultimately joins forces with the human princes Callum and Ezran to deliver the egg of the Dragon Prince back to his mother. Throughout the series, Rayla and Callum develop a romantic relationship.

== Storylines ==
=== Background ===
Rayla was born on the 31 July to the warriors Lain and Tiadrin. However, her parents were later recruited into the Dragonguard, an elite force of eight warriors, recruited from the various elfin races, who are sworn to protect the egg of the Dragon Prince, as he was the first dragonling hatched in millennia. As a result, she was taken in by the head assassin Runaan and his husband Ethari, an expert craftsman. For years, Runaan trains Rayla to be an assassin like himself, to protect those she holds most dear.

Four months before the start of the series, Avizandum, the King of the Dragons and Archdragon of the Sky is slain by King Harrow and Lord Viren by a powerful dark magic spell. Frightened by this, the Dragonguard abandon their duty, apparently including Rayla's parents. This allows Lord Viren to supposedly destroy the egg of the Dragon Prince. Ashamed of her parents' alleged cowardice, Rayla joins a small group of assassins on a mission to avenge Avizandum by killing King Harrow and his heir, Crown Prince Ezran.

==== Bloodmoon Huntress ====
A younger Rayla is angry at her parents' decision to leave her at home with their closest friends, Runaan and Ethari, so that they can fulfill their duty as members of the Dragonguard. She struggles to adjust to her new home and becomes curious of how secretive Runaan is about his line of work. One night, she follows him and discovers that he is an assassin as she watches him try to guide fellow assassin Andromeda into unlocking her moonshadow form. Runaan eventually discovers her and orders her to return home. Though he insists that he must protect his people and he is making sacrifices so that those he loves don't have to, Rayla is appalled at the idea of killing people. Things continue to remain tense as the annual Bloodmoon Harvest festival approaches despite multiple attempts from Runaan, Ethari and Andromeda to help Rayla understand the necessity of assassins to protect people from those who seek to harm them.

While wandering the forests around the Silvergrove, Rayla encounters the young Skywing elf Suroh, who pleads for help as his family has been abducted by Kim'Dael the Bloodmoon Huntress, an ancient moonshadow elf who intends to use them for a blood ritual. Rayla attempts to warn Runaan and Ethari but they do not believe her when Suroh disappears. When the Bloodmoon Harvest Festival finally approaches, Rayla attempts to leave to save Suroh's family herself but is stopped by guards on patrol. In order to get passed then undetected, Rayla reflects on the Runaan's explanation of the moonshadow form and manages to unlock it for the first time. With her new abilities, Rayla leaves quietly to try and confronts the Bloodmoon Huntress and helps Suroh try to save his parents from being used as sacrifices for an annual blood ritual for the rogue Moonshadow elf. However, the Bloodmoon Huntress overwhelms her and causes her to fall into the river. Runaan and Ethari narrowly save her from drowning, but the experience leaves her with severe aquaphobia. With her foster fathers by her side, Rayla helps Suroh sneak away with his parents, as Runaan and Kim'Dael face off, with the latter using Runaan's love for his husband and Rayla to gain the upper hand. Unable to consume the Skywing elves' blood, Kim'Dael vows to return to fully replenish her strength on Xadia herself. Better understanding the work of an assassin, and wanting to be able to protect the people she loves, Rayla asks Runaan to train her to be an assassin like himself as she begins to adjust to her new life with her foster fathers.

==== Lunabloom ====
With the help of Runaan, young Rayla makes a present from a Lunabloom flower for Ethari's birthday.

=== Book One: Moon (2018) ===
Rayla joins Runaan and four other assassins on a mission to assassinate King Harrow and his son Prince Ezran to avenge the death of the dragon king and his egg the Dragon Prince at the hands of Harrow. Despite being the fastest and strongest of the assassins, Rayla has not taken a life yet and is hesitant at the prospect of doing so. Soon after arriving in the human kingdom of Katolis, The Moonshadow assassins are discovered by Marcos, a soldier in the Crownguard. Rayla is sent by Runaan to kill him, but although she manages to corner the soldier, she hesitates upon seeing his fear, allowing him to escape and warn the king. Fearful of Runaan's reaction, Rayla deceives him by staining her swords with deathberry juice. Per Moonshadow elven custom, Rayla and her fellow assassin bind themselves to their mission by tying ribbons around their wrists. Her deception is later revealed and Runaan takes her off the mission. Determined to make up for her mistake, Rayla sneaks into the castle to kill Harrow and Ezran but finds Harrow's stepson Callum instead. To protect his younger brother, Callum lies that he is Ezran, but his deception is soon revealed when Ezran shows up. Rayla chases the two princes to Viren's secret underground dungeon, where they discover the egg of the Dragon Prince and realize it was not destroyed.

Rayla abandons her mission to kill Harrow and Ezran, deciding that since the Dragon Prince's egg survives, revenge is unnecessary. However, even when shown the egg, Runaan refuses to back down and Rayla engages her mentor in a duel to protect the princes. The two seem evenly matched, but Runaan deserts the fight to focus on killing Harrow. Rayla, Callum, Ezran, and Bait (Ezran's pet Glow Toad) flee the castle, resolving to take the Dragon Prince egg home together. As they escape, however, one of Rayla's ribbons falls off, symbolizing Harrow's demise, but Rayla doesn't tell the princes. Because Callum now has a Primal Stone (an orb containing magical energy), Rayla educates the prince on the six Primal Sources of nature. Callum asks Rayla to help retrieve a cube that has the Primal Sources' symbols on it, and Rayla agrees only reluctantly. However, while retrieving the mysterious item, Rayla is captured by the prince's aunt, General Amaya. Callum, Ezran, and Bait rescue Rayla, but are soon cornered by Amaya and her soldiers. Desperate, Callum lies that Rayla wants to kill him and Ezran, hurting the elf's feelings. Rayla pretends to hold Callum and Ezran hostage to escape. Rayla realizes that her remaining assassin ribbon is getting tighter and will continue to do so until her hand comes off. Whilst traveling on a boat, Rayla opens up to the princes about herself but claims her parents are dead. When their boat is attacked by a giant fish, Rayla admits that she is afraid of water, but braves through her fear to save Bait from being eaten. Rayla admits her parents are alive but is ashamed of them for allegedly abandoning their duty to protect the Dragon Prince's egg and wishes to atone for their failure by returning the egg to his mother in Xadia.

The next day, Rayla is attacked by Corvus, a soldier sent by Amaya to track them, and defeats him. Later, while traveling up a mountain, an argument between Rayla and Callum about the former's trustworthiness, coupled with a burp from Bait, causes an avalanche. The trio ends up on an unstable frozen lake, where Rayla reveals the true nature of her wrist ribbon, but before she can reveal the death of Harrow, Callum desperately shoves the Dragon egg into Rayla's hands, causing her to drop it due to her dying hand. Ezran rescues the egg, but the freezing water leaves it severely weakened. Later, the group travels into a human town, where Rayla disguises herself as a human and unsuccessfully attempts to cut off her wrist ribbon with a Sunforge blade, a super-heated dagger made by Sunfire elves. The group then travel up a mountain called the "Cursed Caldera" to find a mysterious "miracle healer". During the trip, they work together to slay a giant leech. The supposed "healer" turns out to be a female Moonshadow Elf Moon Mage named Lujanne, who specializes in illusions. By unleashing the storm inside his Sky Primal Stone, Callum manages to hatch the egg of the Dragon Prince, Azymondias, who Ezran nicknames Zym. Zym bites off Rayla's wrist ribbon, saving her hand.

=== Book Two: Sky (2019) ===
Though delighted to have both working hands again, Rayla wishes to move on immediately, but the others do not. Rayla is later attacked by Viren's children, Soren and Claudia, but the fight is stopped by Callum. Rayla distrusts Soren and Claudia and suspects the former of trying to kill Ezran, but Callum doesn't believe her because he hasn't known her as long as Soren and Claudia. Feeling guilty, Rayla decides to tell Callum about Harrow's death, but Claudia does so first. Rayla's secret damages her friendship with Callum, but they reconcile after the latter finds himself unable to tell Ezran. Still mistrustful of Soren and Claudia, Rayla arranges a trick to reveal their treachery, and she, the princes, Zym, and Bait escape. Later, the group hires a blind ex-pirate, Captain Villads to take them across an ocean. During the trip, Rayla admits to Villads that she no longer believes that being an assassin is for her.

After finally making it to shore, Rayla and the group witness a dragon being shot down after burning a town. Wishing to break the cycle of revenge, Rayla goes to save the wounded dragon, and, aided by Callum using dark magic, helps her escape. Afterwards, Corvus arrives and reveals Harrow's death to Ezran, devastating him. Ezran goes off to grieve and Corvus soon goes after him, leaving Rayla, Zym, and Bait to watch over Callum, who has gone into a coma as a result of using dark magic. As Callum's condition worsens, Rayla becomes increasingly distraught over the possibility of losing him. She is about to confess something to him but is cut off when he wakes up. Callum reveals he has managed to connect to the sky arcanum, allowing him to use sky magic without a primal stone. Ezran leaves the group to take the throne of Katolis. Rayla, Callum, and Zym continue their trek into Xadia, but soon find their path blocked by a massive dragon, which Rayla fearfully identifies as Sol Regem.

=== Book Three: Sun (2019) ===
Rayla reveals that Sol Regem is the former King of the Dragons, left a bitter and hostile shadow of his former self after being left blind during the wars between humans and magical creatures but not before putting an end to the first dark mage Ziard. The trio attempts to sneak past the ancient dragon, but Zym's fearful whimpers expose their presence. Rayla reluctantly attempts to convince Sol Regem to let them pass, but the attempt fails when the dragon detects dark magic on Callum. The trio manages to outwit Sol Regem and finally make it into Xadia.

Rayla, Callum, and Zym travel through Xadia, and the two teenagers grow noticeably closer. However, when they reach Rayla's birthplace, the Silvergrove, Rayla is devastated to learn that she has been made a "ghost", a magically cursed outcast, for abandoning her mission of assassination. They manage to make contact with Ethari, Runaan's husband, who gives them animal mounts to reach Queen Zubeia, Zym's mother, more quickly. They soon encounter a rogue Skywing elf named Nyx, who offers to guide the trio through the dangerous Midnight Desert. While the group takes a rest in the oasis, Rayla's grief over her banishment boils over, causing Callum to comfort her by giving several compliments. Unfortunately, Rayla mistakes the compliments for advances and kisses Callum, who to his surprise, accidentally rejects Rayla, angering her. The pair then discover that Nyx has stolen Zym. Rayla and Callum pursue Nyx, retrieve Zym from her and Rayla saves the Skywing elf from Soulfang serpents; cobra-like snakes which drain people's souls. Callum compliments Rayla for her courage, calling her a hero, and kisses her. He then realizes he has gone too far and tries to move away, but Rayla forces him to kiss which he surrenders to happily, beginning their relationship.

Rayla, Callum, and Zym finally reach the Storm Spire, the sky nexus and home of Zubeia, where they reunite with Ezran and Bait. When the group reaches the top, they are greeted by the Skywing elf mage Ibis, who reveals that Zubeia has gone comatose in her grief over losing her mate and her egg. When a repentant Soren arrives and warns them about Viren's invasion, Ibis encourages the group to leave with Zym to protect him from Viren. Rayla decides to stay and give her life to protect the Dragon Queen as an act of redemption for her parents failure. This causes a heated argument between her and Callum, who accuses her of acting out of pride, and she storms off to the summit. Using moon magic, Callum learns that Rayla's parents stayed and fought until overpowered, and convinced Viren steal the egg rather than destroy it as it could be used for dark magic, thus saving Zym. Relieved by this, Rayla agrees to decide together what to do the protect Zym. Joined by Amaya, Janai and the remnants of the Sunfire Elves' army, Rayla and her friends prepare to make their stand against Viren and his army of magically enhanced soldiers.

During the battle, Rayla stays in the Storm Spire to protect Zym and is appointed a dragonguard like her parents. She is later attacked and immobilised by Viren, who attempts to harvest Zym's power for himself. After freeing herself with Bait's help, she confronts Viren at the summit of the Storm Spire but he disarms her with a wave of dark magic and continues to harvest Zym's power. In a last-ditch effort to save Zym, Rayla tackles Viren and herself off the pinnacle. Callum leaps after them, unlocking the ability to turn his arms into wings and saving Rayla, while Viren falls to his death. As they fly back to the Storm Spire, Rayla and Callum finally confess their love for each other in the form a midair passionate kiss. Afterward, Rayla, Callum, and the others watch as Queen Zubeia awakens and reunites with her infant son and heir.

==== Through the Moon ====
About two weeks after the Battle of the Storm Spire, Rayla is now living in the human realm of Katolis with Callum and King Ezran. However, she is still troubled by the loss of her parents, Lain and Tiadrin, and foster father Runaan, and doubts that Viren is dead, as his body was never found. The trio travels back to the Cursed Caldrea to perform a rebirth ritual for Lujanne's pet Moon Phoenix, Phoe-Phoe.

Rayla's dwelling on the fate of her parents, Runaan and Viren puts a strain on her relationship with Callum, who wishes to move on. However, Callum, remembering that the Moon Nexus can be used to enter a world between life and death, comes up with an idea to rebuild the Moon Henge to allow Rayla to enter it and find closure. Rayla agrees, albeit reluctantly after learning that the ritual involves swimming in water. With the help of a large and strong man named Allen, Lujanne's new boyfriend, they succeed in rebuilding the ruins and Rayla enters the portal. While inside, she encounters the spirits of her four fellow assassins, who attack Rayla for failing her mission. However, they allow her to proceed after they notice her missing binding and conclude that she has carried out her mission after all, despite Rayla's attempts to correct them. Eventually, Rayla discovers a large cocoon, which contains a sleeping Viren inside. The souls of fallen soldiers then attack Rayla and attempt to trap her in the Spirit World of Xadia forever, but Callum manages to save her.

Rayla reluctantly concludes that her family is dead. Although Callum tries to comfort her, Rayla confesses that she saw Lord Viren sleeping inside a cocoon, and concludes that this means he is indeed alive and that she must find him and kill him before he hurts more people. Not wanting her to go alone, Callum insists they search for him together and Rayla promises him that they will before the two confess their love for each other once more. Fearing for Callum's safety, however, Rayla remorsefully departs alone in the middle of the night, leaving Callum a heartfelt letter on the morning of his fifteenth birthday.

Rayla subsequently spends the next two years searching for Viren but fails to find any trace of him. During her search, Rayla finds and adopts an orphan cuddlemonkey who she names Stella.

==== Chasing Shadows ====
Two years after the events of Through the Moon and shortly before the events of the fourth season, Rayla and Stella arrive in Scumport, a Xadian island town, in the hope of finding information that could potentially lead to Lord Viren. After encountering a fellow ghosted Moonshadow elf called "Redfeather", Rayla agrees to fight for her in the fighting pit in exchange for the information the former has regarding a dark mage in Scumport. Rayla manages to defeat her first two opponents, earning her the moniker "New Moon" from the crowd. Her third opponent is a human soldier from Katolis, who reminds her of Callum and causes her to wonder about him. She is further distracted when she glimpses a red scarf, Callum's signature accessory, in the crowd. This causes her to lose the match and she receives a wooden token called Finnegrin's Favor as a consolation prize. Although disappointed that she could not hold her end of the deal, Redfeather agrees to tell Rayla what she knows about the dark mage on the condition that she bring back whatever dark magic ingredients they have.

Using the information Redfeather gave her, Rayla travels to the northern coast of Scumport where the dark mage is expected to make a trade. Seeing a hooded figure procuring blood coral from a Skywing elf, Rayla thinks she has finally found Viren and chases him. After pinning him down and preparing to kill him, Rayla is disappointed to find that the hooded figure is not Viren, but a younger dark mage from the human Kingdom Neolandia. Rayla is hesitant to kill him and the dark mage manages to escape with most of the blood coral. Though disappointed by Rayla's failure, Redfeather suggests Rayla stay in Scumport in case any new leads on Viren's whereabouts turn up. Redfeather also reminds Rayla about her ghosting and discourages her from trying to be the person who would be welcomed back home as she can never return to the Silvergrove. After remembering Callum's words about her being selfless, strong, and caring, Rayla decides to abandon her search and return to Katolis. Accepting her decision, Redfeather gives Rayla a Finnegrin's Favor as a token for the Ferryman so she can return to Scumport later.

=== Book Four: Earth (2022) ===
Rayla returns to Katolis and visits Callum, now the high mage of Katolis, in his study shortly after his seventeenth birthday. Taken aback by Rayla's abrupt return, and still deeply hurt and angry at her for leaving him, Callum responds coldly to her return and rebuffs her attempts to reconnect with him. Acknowledging that she hurt Callum, Rayla respects his unwillingness to talk but persuades him to let her stay with him in silence. When Callum falls asleep, she expresses regret for having let her obsession with revenge hurt their relationship before departing. She later reveals her return to Ezran and receives a much warmer welcome from him before a message from Ibis arrives warning them of the impending return of Aaravos, a dangerous Startouch elf Archmage. Rayla joins the group on their quest to stop Aaravos from being released from his prison and flies with Zubeia, Zym and Ezran to the Stormspire, where they find Ibis dead at the summit. Callum and Soren later arrive with a looking glass Callum has been studying, which Zubeia reveals acts as a window into Aaravos's prison. Zubeia darkens the room to activate the looking glass and Rayla and the others see Aaravos for the first time. She is horrified when he uses dark magic to possess Callum. Using Callum to communicate to the group, Aaravos mocks them as pathetic children and taunts Rayla for being an assassin who isn't capable of killing.

Realising that Claudia is working to free Aaravos, Rayla and the others journey to Umber Tor to visit Rex Igneous, the Archdragon of Earth, to convince him to give them the clue to Aaravos's prison which he was entrusted with. Throughout the journey, Rayla makes several attempts to reconnect with Callum but he continues to rebuff her due to his lingering resentment. As they travel through an underground passage to Rex Igneous's lair, Callum wakes her and asks to talk to her. Thinking he wants to talk about their relationship, Rayla eagerly agrees but he instead asks her to kill him if he ever gets possessed by Aaravos again. Rayla refuses and berates him for fearing he is on a path of darkness, suggesting he just take a different path before going back to sleep. When they arrive in Rex Igneous's lair, Rayla offers her butterfly knives, along with Callum's staff and Ezran's crown, as a gift to the Archdragon in exchange for the information he was entrusted with. Rex Igneous rejects the gifts but is appeased by a brown sludge tart offered by Ezran and admits he has a map marking the location of Aaravos's prison. Claudia intercepts them and puts them to sleep with her ocarina before obtaining a copy of the map carved onto Rex Igneous's tooth. When Rex Igneous goes on a rampage, Rayla sees Viren retrieving his staff. Shocked to have finally found Viren, she insists to Callum that she has to go after her and he lets her. She catches up to them and holds Claudia's Earthblood elf boyfriend Terry at knifepoint. In order to save Terry, Claudia reveals that Rayla's long-lost parents, Lain and Tiadrin, and her guardian Runaan were imprisoned by Viren within cursed coins. Claudia offers her the pouch containing the coins in exchange for Terry, but Rayla refuses to make a deal with her, prompting Claudia to throw the pouch into the nearby lava to force Rayla to release him. Stella saves the pouch using her ability to create portals but Rayla discovers she was tricked as the pouch only contains rocks, causing her to cry in anguish. Disgusted by Claudia's cruelty, Terry rebukes her and convinces her to give Rayla the real coins. Relieved to have her family, Rayla escapes Umber Tor and reunites with the group, where a relieved Callum embraces her and finally admits that he's glad she came back.

=== Book Five: Ocean (2023) ===
Rayla and Callum return to Katolis while Ezran, Soren, Corvus, Zym, and Zubeia go to see Domina Profundis, the Archdragon of the Ocean, to convince her to give them the clue to Aaravos's prison which she was entrusted with. Looking over the cursed coins, Rayla promises to her trapped family that she will free them, but keeps them a secret from Callum.

Rayla has Stella steal the key to Callum's study and sneaks into Viren's dungeon, hoping to find a way to free her family from the coins. She discovers a fourth coin containing a human she does not recognize (who is later revealed to be Kpp'Ar, Viren's dark magic mentor) and finds Runaan's bow. Grieving over her trapped family, Rayla has a vision of Runaan and her parents bequeathing the bow to her as she decides to prioritize stopping Aaravos over helping them. After being arrested for trespassing, Callum expresses his trust in Rayla and sets her free.

Callum and Rayla decide to travel to the Great Bookery in Lux Aurea in hopes of learning of a way to kill Startouch elves and begin to slowly rebuild their relationship during the journey. While camping, they are attacked by a banther corrupted by the Sunforge and narrowly escape. When they arrive in Lux Aurea, Rayla, Callum, Amaya, Gren, and Kazi travel to the Great Bookery in the abandoned city and stand guard while Callum and Kazi research Startouch elves. Alone with Rayla, Amaya takes the opportunity to apologize for their altercation at the banther lodge two years prior, then threatens her for hurting Callum, accusing her of abandoning him and breaking his heart. Angered by the allegation, Rayla claims that she left Callum behind to protect him and insists she needed to be strong alone. To her surprise, Amaya relates to this and admits she believed the same when her sister Sarai died. However, since meeting Janai and falling in love, she has come to believe that loving someone and trusting them to share the burdens you carry makes you far stronger than you can ever be alone. Inspired by this, Rayla approaches Callum and opens up to him about the cursed coins. Recalling having seen a star spell which can restore bodies to separated spirits, Callum delays their return to retrieve it. Because of the delay, Rayla, Callum and Amaya get trapped in the bookery with a group of corrupted banthers and work together to fight them off before being saved by Zubeia.

Using the information Ezran received from Domina Profundis, Rayla and the group go to see Akiyu, a Tidebound elf Archmage who created Aaravos's prison. Akiyu gives them a map revealing the prison's secret location at the bottom of the Sea of the Castout. When Zubeia is incapacitated by an infection from being bitten by a corrupted banther at the Great Bookery, Rayla takes the group to Scumport, a port town she previously visited during her quest to locate Viren, to try and find a boat to take them to the Sea of the Castout. While there they reunite with Villads and Nyx, who agree to take them to the Sea of the Castout on Villads' boat. However, they are pursued by the Tidebound elf pirate Finnegrin when Ezran insists on liberating three baby glowtoads from him to save them from being used as leviathan bait. Despite their best efforts, they are unable to evade his superior ship and are all captured and Callum is tortured for information on dark magic. Enraged by this, Rayla attempts to attack Finnegrin, but he uses ocean magic to freeze her blood, incapacitating her and causing her excruciating pain. Angered by this, Callum punches Finnegrin, causing Finnegrin to decide he’s going to feed Rayla to the leviathan in revenge. Realizing his mistake, Callum is forced to secretly use dark magic to free himself and save her. Finnegrin attempts to freeze Callum's blood as well, but Callum manages to connect to the ocean arcanum, enabling him to counter the spell. Finnegrin is subsequently defeated and killed by his bodyguard Deadwood when Soren convinces him to stand up to Finnegrin's abuse.

After reaching the location of Aaravos' underwater prison, Callum uses his newfound ability to use ocean magic to cast a spell that allows himself, Ezran, and Rayla to breathe underwater. Despite Callum's attempts to calm her, Rayla cannot overcome her fear of water and stays behind. Despite her fears, Rayla manages to dive into the water and fends off Claudia during a brief confrontation, which ends when she slices off Claudia's left leg and forces her to retreat. Ezran retrieves Aaravos's prison, which is revealed to be a large pearl hidden in a clam, and the trio returns to the surface. Safe on the boat, Rayla holds Callum's hand as they are all relieved to have managed to secure Aaravos's prison and protect it from Claudia.

=== Book Six: Stars (2024) ===
Returning to Katolis, Rayla and the others show the prison to Opeli and discuss what they should do with it. After multiple suggestions, Ezran decides to keep the prison hidden in Viren's dungeon. Fearing that Aaravos will control him again, Callum suggests to Rayla that they take the prison to the Celestial elves at the Star Scraper at the Frozen Sea, which he learned about in the Great Bookery believing they will know how to destroy it without freeing Aaravos. Callum also reveals that the Celestial elves have the Novablade, which is able to kill Startouch elves, and the Corona of the Heavens, which holds the quasar diamonds he needs to cast the star spell which can free Rayla's family from the cursed coins. Despite this, Rayla turns down the suggestion, deciding that protecting the prison is more important than freeing her family. That night, Aaravos possesses Callum and makes him sleepwalk to his prison in Viren's dungeon. Frightened by this, Callum wakes Rayla and explains what happened. Deciding they have to take action, Callum has Barius create a candy decoy of the prison and stitches spell-blocking runes onto a blanket to contain the real prison. The next day, Rayla and Callum, along with Stella and the baby glowtoad Sneezles, depart Katolis with the prison to journey to the Star Scraper.

While crossing the Frozen Sea, Rayla's shadowpaw mount almost drowns after collapsing through the ice and is narrowly saved by Callum using ocean magic but loses several supplies in the process. Realizing the terrain ahead is too dangerous for them, Rayla sends the shadowpaw back to Ethari at the Silvergrove and she and Callum continue their journey on foot. Eventually, they come across a frozen ship called the Ray of Illumination. Hoping to salvage supplies to replace the ones they lost, Rayla and Stella explore the ship and find the diary of its captain Esmeralda Skall in which she writes her regrets for leaving the man she loved to pursue glory and adventure. Seeing her own regrets for leaving Callum reflected in Skall's, Rayla becomes emotional as she reads the diary until Callum runs in after hearing Rayla crying. They decide to take shelter in the ship for the night and Callum opens up to Rayla about his late biological father and recites some poetry he wrote about the stars. Hoping to get Rayla and Callum back together, Stella and Sneezles orchestrate a romantic moment between them, and the two almost kiss before Callum pulls back and admits to using dark magic again to save Rayla from Finnegrin. Shocked by this, the two have a heated argument and Rayla urges Callum to sacrifice her to avoid using dark magic again. Their argument causes the ship to rock and catch fire when a nearby gas lamp falls over. Though they manage to escape, Rayla goes back to the burning ship to retrieve Aaravos prison before it collapses. Watching the ship sink through the ice, Rayla reluctantly promises to kill Callum if he ever gets possessed by Aaravos again.

Rayla and Callum eventually arrive at the Star Scraper and are greeted by the Celestial elves, an ancient sect of blindfolded Skywing elves dedicated to the stars. The Celestial elf siblings Astrid and Kosmo believe Callum and Rayla are the chosen two who were prophesized to end the ice storms caused by an ice behemoth, which has prevented the Celestial elves from experiencing a moonless night for centuries. The siblings take Rayla and Callum to see the elder, the leader of the Celestial elves. The elder reveals that the Novablade was given to a human girl centuries ago and that it can only destroy a Startouch elf's physical body, after which they will return to the heavens and manifest in Xadia again when their stars align.

Though devastated to learn that they can never truly kill Aaravos, Rayla and Callum decide to fulfill the prophecy which states that the warrior and the mage shall pierce the heart of the beast and melt the threat forever. Taking this literally, Callum discovers a way to melt ice using ocean magic but requires the rune to be carved into the ice for it to work. Rayla and Callum confront the ice behemoth and see a large glowing spot on its chest. Thinking it's the ice behemoth's heart, Callum and Rayla work together for Rayla to get close enough to carve the rune into its heart. As Rayla's about to carve the rune, she notices the heart is the pendant of a collar and realizes the ice behemoth is Esmeray, the companion of Luna Tenebris, the former dragon queen and the Archdragon of the moon. Realizing Esmeray is creating the ice storms during moonless nights out of grief over the loss of Luna Tenebris, Rayla comforts them with a lullaby and assures Esmeray that Luna Tenebris's love is with her even when the moon is not. Stella then gives Rayla a moon opal she took from the Umber Tor and she uses it to repair Esmeray's pendant, ending the ice storms and fulfilling the prophecy. In gratitude, the elder awards them with the Corona of the Heavens so they can free Rayla's family. Rayla and Callum then witness the Celestial elves experience their first moonless night in centuries. After removing his blindfold for the first time and experiencing pure starlight, Kosmo achieves enlightenment and becomes Timeblind, allowing him to see the past, present, and future as one. Kosmo praises Rayla for her compassion but passes out upon seeing that Callum is filled with darkness.

Rayla comforts Callum and watches as he undergoes a ritual to find his innermost truth and cleanse the darkness within him. Callum completes the ritual and comes to realize that his love for Rayla is his innermost truth. Later in their room, Rayla notices Callum unable to sleep and he admits to reflecting on the moment Rayla returned from her search. They decide to recreate the moment and Callum walks up to her and they share their first kiss in two years. Afterward, the two proclaim their love for each other and kiss again, finally reconciling their relationship.

The next day, Rayla and Callum leave the prison with the Celestial elves and depart from the Star Scraper, with Rayla using a pair of starsilk wings to fly alongside Callum to head for the Moon Nexus. They eventually arrive at the Moon Nexus and reunite with Lujanne and Allen. After examining the Corona of the Heavens, Lujanne realizes that one of the quasar diamonds embedded in it is a fake. Rayla is devastated by this as it means they will only be able to free two of her family from the coins. Lujanne reveals that the cursed coins only contain part of her family's souls, with the other half trapped in the spirit world and they must be reunited for the soul to be freed or allowed to pass on into death. Callum gives Rayla a bracelet made of moon phoenix feathers to keep her tethered to the living world and the two share a kiss before Rayla jumps into the Moon Nexus and enters the spirit world once more. While inside she encounters the broken spirit of Runaan who attacks her and knocks her down a hill, where she encounters the spirits of her parents dancing in a meadow. After assuring them that they saved the dragon prince, Rayla unites their broken spirits and allows them to pass on after an emotional final goodbye. She then confronts Runaan again and convinces him to return to the living world with her to reunite with Ethari and his spirit becomes a lotus flower for her to bring back. After returning to the living world, Callum casts the spell to return Runaan to his body and Rayla happily embraces him. She tries to introduce him to Callum but he is distracted when he notices a large plume of smoke in the distance coming from Katolis.

=== Book Seven: Dark (2024) ===
Seeing Callum's concern over the smoke coming from Katolis, Rayla urges him to venture ahead and see what happened. Though Callum is reluctant to be separated again, Rayla promises to find him in Katolis once Runaan has recovered enough to be able to travel and the two share a kiss before Callum flies off. After Runaan recovers, he and Rayla travel to Katolis to find the city destroyed, having been attacked by Sol Regem due to Aaravos' manipulations. After reuniting with Callum, she is shocked when Ezran, enraged upon seeing Runaan, has him promptly arrested for murdering his father King Harrow two years prior.

Rayla travels with the survivors of Katolis' destruction to the winter lodge, where Runaan is kept prisoner in its basement. Rayla demands that Runaan be released but Ezran refuses and plans to have Runaan executed. After discussing the issue with Callum, Rayla decides to break out Runaan so he can reunite with Ethari as they've spent more than two years apart. After freeing Runaan and sneaking outside, they are discovered by Soren and he and Rayla duel until Ezran and several guards arrive. Despite being outnumbered, Rayla refuses to surrender and she and Runaan are almost captured until Callum intervenes and freezes all the guard's feet in ice before the three of them flee on a boat.

After arriving at the Silvergrove, Rayla urges Runaan to reunite with Ethari, hiding her banishment from him. Knowing she cannot stay, Rayla wants to leave before telling Callum that her home is wherever he is. After reuniting with Ethari and learning of Rayla's banishment, Runaan tells Rayla of a ritual that can be used to lift it. Runaan and Ethari take Rayla to see Lyrennus, the Silvergrove's keeper of the Well of the Forgotten. Lyrennus agrees to perform the ritual but warns Rayla that if she fails it then Runaan and Ethari will be banished alongside her. Rayla undergoes the ritual to face the spirits of her fellow assassins Ram, Skor, Callisto, and Andromeda who died attempting to assassinate Harrow who Rayla was blamed for abandoning as she was the only survivor. Rayla apologizes to each of them in turn, reminding them of the pledges they made and how their sacrifices ultimately lead to peace between humans and elves. Despite receiving forgiveness from the spirits, Lyrennus, who is also Ram's father, still blames Rayla for his son's death. Rayla apologizes for Ram's death but asserts that punishing her will not bring Lyrennus his son back or help him grieve. Heeding this, Lyrennus decides to forgive Rayla, completing the ritual and undoing her banishment from the Silvergrove. Overjoyed, Rayla hugs Runaan, Ethari, and Callum, happy to finally be able to return home.

After spending two weeks in the Silvergrove, Callum admits his desire to stay there and settle down with Rayla before Astrid appears and reveals that Aaravos has returned. Having left the Celestial elves to warn them, Astrid reveals that Kosmo foresaw Aaravos's return and his plan to unleash the spirits of the dead and bring eternal night. Astrid also admits that the prison Rayla and Callum brought to the Star Scraper was actually the candy decoy, allowing Claudia to retrieve the real prison from Katolis and free Aaravos.

Determined to stop Aaravos, Callum's comes up with a plan to unite the Archdragons and imprison Aaravos again. After Callum sends a letter to Ezran asking him to go get Zubeia, Rayla and the other split up to prepare for the final night against Aaravos. While Callum and Runaan go to see Archmage Akiyu to have her create a new prison and Ethari flies to Umber Tor to summon Rex Igneous, Rayla flies to the Storm Spire to retrieve the Siren Stone and summon Domina Profundis. After activating the beacon to summon the Archdragon, Rayla flies to Lux Aurea, Where Aaravos has used the Sun Orb to darken the sun and create eternal night. During the final fight, Rex Igneous is killed by Avizandum, whose petrified body was resurrected by dark magic to fight for Aaravos. When Callum and Runaan arrived Rayla and the others fight through the army of the dead to get close to Aaravos so he can be imprisoned. Callum then confronts Aaravos at the top of the Sun Orb's tower. Because Claudia killed Akiyu to prevent her from creating another prison, Callum announces his plan to use dark magic to trap Aaravos's soul in Runaan's cursed coin then have Runaan kill him so that Aaravos cannot possess him again.

Horrified, Rayla begs Callum not to use dark magic again but he insists he has to in order to stop Aaravos and save everyone. However, Claudia attacks Runaan and drags him to the ground. With no other choice, Rayla grabs Runaan's bow and prepares to kill Callum herself, tearfully declaring that she will do anything to stop Aaravos and save the world. Callum begins the spell to imprison Aaravos in the coin bit it is interrupted when Avizandum manages to overcome Aaravos's control and attacks Aaravos. He and Zubeia then drag Aaravos high into the air and force him to drop the Sun Orb, which smashes on the ground and ends the eternal night. Rayla watches as Avizandum bites Aaravos, which destroys his physical body in a supernova explosion which kills him and Zubeia. Domina Profundis then sacrifices herself to protect Rayla and the others from the explosion.

Some time later, Rayla and the others gather in the Valley of Graves in Katolis as Ezran unveils a memorial to honour the Archdragons' sacrifice, though Aaravos will return in seven years time when his stars align and allow him to materialize in Xadia again. Several months later, She and Callum stand together at the Border as Ezran announces the construction of a new city called Evrkynd where Humans and Elves can live together in harmony. Back at the Banther lodge, Rayla watches as Runaan faces Ezran and apologises for killing Harrow. Rayla is thrilled when Ezran forgives him and she and Ezran reconcile as well. That night, Callum wakes her and, after covering her eyes with his scarf, takes her to a nearby bridge where he surprises her with a moonlight serenade from Bait, Stella, the Baitlings and the shimmercrows Aaron and Sam. Amused, Rayla admits that she loves everything about Callum and the two share a passionate kiss.

== Development ==
=== Concept and creation ===
Rayla's early designs pictured her as too confident and had to be adjusted. Her early expression sheets also served as a practice for Wonderstorm's artists to figure out the four fingers of elven hands. In early concepts, Rayla had an additional marking on her forehead. It was Giancarlo Volpe's idea to put in Rayla's "Naruto-run" with encouragement from Lulu Younes.

=== Characterization and progression ===
Rayla is described as courageous and sharp-witted. Despite being raised to be an assassin and possessing all the skills required for the profession, Rayla is very moral and compassionate, and thus lacks the ruthlessness needed to take a life, especially the life of one who hasn't wronged her personally.

Rayla initially has a rather black-and-white perspective on the conflict between humans and magical creatures, but she later comes to view it in a more complex light.

Rayla suffers from aquaphobia; she is terrified of water and often gets seasick when she's on a boat, the direct cause revealed in the graphic novel Bloodmoon Huntress.

=== Powers and abilities ===
In the world of The Dragon Prince, only magical creatures can use magic because they have magical energy within them. All magic originates from one of six Primal Sources; the Sun, the Moon, the Stars, the Earth, the Sky, and the Ocean. As a Moonshadow elf, Rayla is naturally connected to the moon, and while she has never been seen performing any spells, she can use her primal connection to assume her "Moonshadow form" during a full moon. In this form, she is nearly invisible. The novelization of season one reveals that Rayla rather ironically dislikes using this ability, as she finds it disorientating.

Rayla is a master sword-fighter, especially with dual blades, and is believed to be the fastest and strongest of her fellow assassins despite her young age. Rayla's weapon(s) of choice are a pair of twin blades that reflect her fighting style. These weapons were forged by her foster guardian Ethari, and are capable of switching between lethal blades and curved hooks even in mid-air, allowing her to catch an enemy off-guard. They are based on real-life balisongs or butterfly knives in their way to function.

In the fifth season, Rayla takes up using her mentor Runaan's bowblade after finding it in Viren's secret dungeon. She is shown to be a capable archer as she uses the bow to attack several corrupted banthers and later fights Claudia underwater with it.

== Reception ==
Rayla has been generally praised by critics and fans. Swara Ahmed considered her the "best written" and most "compelling" of the three main protagonists, complimenting her internal conflict and determination to "get justice in her own way." He believed audiences would form a connection to Rayla as soon as they saw her eyes. Ahmed considered her story "amazing" and found her journey with Callum and Ezran "entertaining."

However, Rayla has been criticized by some people, and Paula Burrows' performance of the character has been generally mixed. Gavia Baker-Whitelaw of The Daily Dot criticized Rayla's Scottish accent as "the worst part of the show." Some people did like her accent; others criticized it for being "inconsistent" or regarded it as "terrible".
