= The Dragon Prince =

2018 animated television series

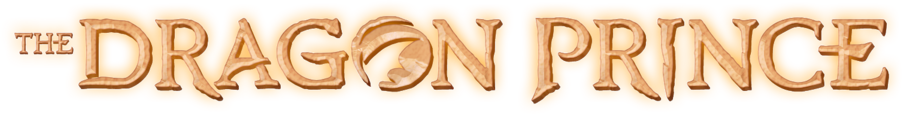
- Also known as: The Dragon Prince: Mystery of Aaravos (seasons 4–7)
- Genre: Fantasy; Action-adventure
- Created by: Aaron Ehasz; Justin Richmond
- Written by: Aaron Ehasz; Justin Richmond; Devon Giehl; Iain Hendry; Neil Mukhopadhyay
- Directed by: Giancarlo Volpe; Villads Spangsberg; George Samilski
- Voices of: Jack DeSena; Paula Burrows; Sasha Rojen; Jason Simpson; Racquel Belmonte; Jesse Inocalla; Erik Todd Dellums; Omari Newton; Rena Anakwe; Luc Roderique; Benjamin Callins
- Composer: Frederik Wiedmann
- Countries of origin: United States; Canada
- Original language: English
- No. of seasons: 7
- No. of episodes: 63 (list of episodes)

Production
- Executive producers: Aaron Ehasz; Justin Richmond; Justin Santistevan; Delna Bhesania (S1–2); Richard Grieve; Gigi Pritzker (S1, 4–7); Clint Kisker (S2–3); Tina Chow (S3–7); Giancarlo Volpe (S3)
- Producers: Lauren Topal (S1–2); Devon Giehl; Iain Hendry; Neil Mukhopadhyay (S1–5); Lisa Thibault Woods (S4–7); James Stephenson (S4); Caleb Thomas (S4–7); Paige VanTassell (S5–7)
- Running time: 24–33 minutes
- Production companies: Wonderstorm; MWM Universe; Bardel Entertainment

Original release
- Network: Netflix
- Release: September 14, 2018 – December 19, 2024

The Dragon Prince, also known as The Dragon Prince: Mystery of Aaravos from the fourth season onward, is an animated fantasy television series created by Aaron Ehasz and Justin Richmond for Netflix. Produced by Wonderstorm and animated by Bardel Entertainment, the first season premiered on September 14, 2018. The second season premiered on February 15, 2019, and the third on November 22, 2019, concluding the first saga of the series. Following a three-year hiatus, the fourth season premiered on November 3, 2022, and started the series' second saga. The fifth season premiered on July 22, 2023, and the sixth on July 26, 2024. The seventh and final season premiered on December 19, 2024, concluding the second saga and the series. The series has earned critical acclaim for its story, themes, vocal performances, animation, and humor.

Set in a fantasy world on the fictional continent of Xadia, the story centers on the human princes Callum and Ezran and the Moonshadow Elf Rayla, who seek a peaceful resolution to the thousand-year-old conflict between the human kingdoms, the dragons and elves whilst taking care of the infant Storm Dragon, Azymondias, the titular Dragon Prince.

In July 2025, a sequel series, titled The Dragon King, was announced to be in early development.

== Synopsis ==
=== Background ===
The continent of Xadia is rich in magic derived from six primal sources: the Moon, Sky, Sun, Earth, Ocean, and the Stars. The dragons, elves, and humans of Xadia once lived in peace until the humans, unable to utilize primal magic naturally, began to practice dark magic, which allowed them to draw in and utilize the life essence from magical creatures to manifest their spells at the cost of their spirit being corrupted. This newfound power was gifted to them by the ancient Startouch Elf Aaravos as the start of a millennia-long plan to get revenge for his daughter who was executed after unintentionally showing magic to humans. As a consequence, the humans were driven away to the western half of Xadia by the dragons and elves, and the continent was split in two. Seven centuries later, Aaravos' machinations to cause further conflict between dragons and elves are exposed, resulting in his incarceration under the supervision of the King of the Dragons and Archdragon of the Sky, Avizandum, through an enchanted mirror. Three centuries later, the human King Harrow of Katolis and his advisor, the dark mage Lord Viren, kill Avizandum. Viren then steals the egg of his unborn heir, the Dragon Prince, to harvest for dark magic, with the world convinced that the egg was destroyed.

=== Book One: Moon ===
In retaliation for Avizandum's death, Moonshadow Elf assassins enter Katolis in an attempt to assassinate Harrow and his son, Crown Prince Ezran. Ezran and his elder half-brother Prince Callum are confronted by the young assassin Rayla and together they discover the Dragon Prince's egg fully intact. Harrow is successfully assassinated by Rayla's guardian Runaan, who is subsequently trapped in a cursed coin by Viren. Together, unaware of Harrow's death, Callum, Rayla, and Ezran undertake the dangerous mission to travel to Xadia and return the egg to its mother, the queen of the dragons, to end the conflict between the humans and elves. Hoping to take the throne of Katolis for himself, Viren tasks his children, Soren and Claudia, with hunting down and disposing of the princes whilst their maternal aunt, General Amaya, seeks to return them to Katolis and have Ezran ascend the throne. Callum, Rayla, and Ezran successfully reach the Moon Nexus atop the Cursed Caldera on their journey east where the Dragon Prince's egg hatches, and Azymondias "Zym" is born.

=== Book Two: Sky ===
Callum, Rayla, Ezran, and the newly hatched Prince Azymondias leave the Cursed Caldera and embark on a journey across the sea towards the border between the human kingdoms and Xadia. With the conflict at the border intensifying, Amaya goes into battle against the Sunfire Elves led by their champion Janai. Viren attempts to persuade the other human monarchs to go to war against Xadia, but they all decline. However, Viren forges a secret alliance with the imprisoned Aaravos through the mirror that he had stolen from Avizandum. After reaching a town near the border, Soren and Claudia catch up to Callum, Rayla, and Ezran, but after a confrontation with a young dragon, Soren becomes paralyzed and Claudia later uses dark magic to heal him. Ezran discovers that his father has been killed and leaves the others to return to Katolis and assume the throne and Callum forms a connection with the Sky arcanum, allowing him to cast sky magic at will. In an attempt to scare the other monarchs into action, Viren, with Aaravos' help, summons elf-like shadow creatures to attack the other kingdoms and the Katolian high council soon arrests him. Callum, Rayla, and Azymondias successfully reach the border but are confronted by Sol Regem, the blind Archdragon of the Sun, who has a strong hatred for humans which was exacerbated by their use of dark magic.

=== Book Three: Sun ===
Callum and Rayla manage to escape from Sol Regem and develop a romantic relationship during their journey to the Storm Spire, the home of Azymondias' mother, Queen Zubeia. Ezran returns home and assumes the throne of Katolis. However, after the other human monarchs are attacked by Viren's shadow creatures, Ezran is manipulated into abdicating after refusing to go to war and flees. Viren is released from prison and leads the combined human armies across the border whilst continuing to receive aid from the deceitful Aaravos. Amaya is defeated by the Sunfire Elves and taken prisoner, and Viren infiltrates the Sunfire Court to kill their queen, Janai's elder sister, and invades their capital of Lux Aurea, corrupting it with dark magic. Ezran reunites with Callum and Rayla, and together they reach the Storm Spire and ally with Amaya, Janai, and the Sunfire Elf army while Soren, shocked by his father's actions, soon joins them. Following a confrontation at the base of the Storm Spire, Viren's army is soon defeated by the elves and their allies whilst Rayla kills Viren by throwing him and herself from the Spire's summit but is saved by Callum who uses sky magic to manifest wings. Together, they reunite Azymondias with his mother, and the humans and elves temporarily end their conflict. Sometime later, having survived the battle, Claudia retrieves her father's body and uses dark magic to resurrect him.

=== Book Four: Earth ===
Two years later, relationships between the elves of Xadia and the human kingdoms have begun to improve. Having taken two years to resurrect Viren, albeit only for thirty days, Claudia is convinced by Aaravos that he can permanently extend her father's life if he is freed from his prison. Callum, now the High Mage of Katolis, and King Ezran reunite with Rayla, who spent two years searching for confirmation of Viren's demise. After Zubeia and Azymondias arrive in Katolis, the dragon queen informs the others of Aaravos' dark history and fears his return. Callum, Rayla, Ezran, and Soren begin a new quest to recover key information about Aaravos' prison that was previously divided amongst the Archdragons to prevent his escape. Together they journey to Umber Tor, home to Rex Igneous, the Archdragon of the Earth, while Viren, Claudia, and her Earthblood Elf boyfriend Terrestrius head there themselves, guided by a homunculus called "The Being" which was created by Aaravos. Janai, now queen of the Sunfire Elves, lives with her people in a refugee camp and soon proposes to Amaya, despite how many of her people fear it will damage their cultural pride. She later defeats her brother Karim, who wishes to maintain the histories and traditions of their people, after he challenges her to a blood duel. Callum and the others meet with Rex Igneous within Umber Tor but are confronted by Viren who, with Claudia's help, recovers the map to Aaravos' prison that was engraved onto Rex Igneous' fang. Rayla retrieves the three cursed coins from Viren that contain the spirits of her parents and Runaan while Viren uses his staff to cast a spell to escape Umber Tor and after exiting he returns to his corrupted form.

=== Book Five: Ocean ===
Claudia and Terrestrius use the map stolen from Rex Igneous to guide their way towards Aaravos' prison but are slowed down by Viren going into a comatose and later catatonic state after he used dark magic for the first time since his resurrection to escape Umber Tor. Ezran and Zubeia seek out Domina Profundis, Archdragon of the Ocean, who informs them that Aaravos' prison is held within a giant pearl. Callum and Rayla reunite with Amaya and head to Lux Aurea's great library. Callum learns that the Novablade, a weapon that can kill Aaravos, is held within the Starscraper along with the rare quasar diamonds, which can be used to free Rayla's loved ones from the cursed coins. During their escape from the city, Zubeia is infected with dark magic, causing her to slowly succumb to its corruption. In Amaya's absence, Karim, who had been banished from the Sunfire Elf domain, summons the Bloodmoon Huntress to steal a sacred Sun Seed from Janai, intending to use it to heal Sol Regem's vision and overthrow his sister. While this effort is thwarted by Amaya on her return, Miyana — one of Janai's generals — betrays her and gives Karim the Sun Seed, as well as an army of defecting Sunfire Elves. Callum, Rayla, Ezran, and Soren find the creator of Aaravos' prison, who tells them of the prison's location in the Sea of the Castout. During their journey there, the group steals a trio of baby Glow Toads from the notorious pirate Finnegrin who pursues them across the sea and Callum forms a connection with the Ocean arcanum during their fight against him, allowing him to cast ocean magic at will. The group eventually arrives at the prison's location and is confronted by Claudia, but during a brief confrontation Rayla cuts off one of her legs, forcing Claudia to retreat, and the group retrieves the pearl. After awakening from his catatonia on the final day of his life, Viren has an epiphany and decides to accept his fate out of remorse for his actions which led Claudia down a dark path.

=== Book Six: Stars ===
Despite his time having run out, Viren discovers that Claudia performed a blood ritual by sacrificing The Being to make Viren's resurrection permanent. Viren decides to part ways with Claudia and returns to Katolis to atone for his crimes and is immediately imprisoned. With her family having abandoned her, Claudia lashes out at Terrestrius, but he fashions a wooden prosthetic leg for her so Claudia can travel to try and reconcile with her father. After deciding to destroy Aaravos' prison for good, Callum and Rayla journey to the Starscraper to seek the wisdom of the Celestial Elves but find it surrounded by a perpetual ice storm. They discover that while Aaravos' body can be destroyed, his physical form returns when his stars align, meaning that keeping him imprisoned is the only way to stop him. After Callum and Rayla fulfill a prophecy regarding the "Chosen Two" and dissipate the ice storm, the Celestial Elves award them quasar diamonds so Rayla can free her loved ones. After Callum and Rayla profess their love for each other, they travel to the Moon Nexus where Rayla enters the spirit world. Rayla allows the spirits of her parents to pass on but manages to free Runaan from the cursed coin and they return to the living world together. Intent on deposing Janai, Karim presents the Sun Seed to Sol Regem and uses it to restore the dragon's tattered wings. On the day of Amaya and Janai's wedding, Karim leads his army to overthrow his sister but is quickly overwhelmed by Janai's forces as Sol Regem never joined them. Karim's advisor Pharos, who had become corrupted by Aaravos, rides Sol Regem to attack Katolis instead, and Soren frees Viren before helping to evacuate the city. Viren sacrifices himself by using a dark magic spell to shield the citizens. After Sol Regem destroys Katolis, Aaravos confronts him while possessing Pharos and reveals that he had been manipulating the Archdragon for hundreds of years. Sol Regem furiously lashes out at Aaravos but chokes on Pharos' body and dies. Claudia arrives at the ravaged city and is devastated to find Viren dead. Aaravos reveals himself to Claudia and recounts how his daughter was killed after she disrupted the cosmic order by giving humans access to magic. Inspired by this and against Terrestrius' advice, Claudia frees Aaravos from his prison.

=== Book Seven: Dark ===
To potentially bring her father back, Aaravos instructs Claudia on how to invert the Moon Nexus to release the spirits of the dead and get his revenge on the world by breaking the cosmic order. After witnessing the lengths that Claudia is willing to go to and the wicked nature of Aaravos' plans, Terrestrius leaves Claudia and chooses to ally with the humans and elves against them. Callum and Ezran have a falling out after Ezran plans to have Runaan executed for assassinating their father but Callum and Rayla help Runaan escape before traveling to Rayla's home at the Silvergrove. After successfully ending Rayla's banishment, they are soon notified that Aaravos has been freed and begin gathering their allies and the Archdragons to stop him. Despite the group's best efforts, Claudia successfully inverts the Moon Nexus, releasing the spirits of the dead into the living world while Aaravos escapes Ezran's efforts to contain him. Janai and Amaya convince the incarcerated Karim to help destroy the Sun Orb in Lux Aurea that Aaravos plans to corrupt and create an eternal night since sunlight destroys the spirits. Karim betrays them, but Aaravos kills Karim before completing his spell, only for the Archdragons Rex Igneous, Zubeia, and Domina Profundis to attack. Aaravos summons the shade of Avizandum to protect him, which kills Rex Igneous before being convinced to turn against Aaravos. The Sun Orb is successfully destroyed, and the remaining Archdragons sacrifice themselves to destroy Aaravos' mortal form, forcing Claudia to retreat. Callum and Ezran reconcile, with Ezran sparing Runaan from execution and discovering that his father's spirit was transferred to his pet bird moments before his death, but his whereabouts remain unknown. In the aftermath of the battle, the inhabitants of Xadia work together to rebuild the world, beginning with the development of the city Evrkynd and start making preparations for Aaravos' return in seven years time when his stars align.

== Voice cast and characters ==
- Jack DeSena as Prince Callum: A teenage human mage, Ezran's older half-brother and King Harrow's stepson. He becomes the first human to freely wield primal magic and develops a romantic relationship with Rayla.
  - DeSena provides vocalizations for Bait: An extremely grumpy Glow Toad attuned to Sun Magic and the animal companion of Callum and Ezran. He has the magical ability to emanate light from his body, which varies in color depending on his emotional state.
  - DeSena also provides vocalizations for Prince Azymondias "Zym": An infant Storm Dragon, son of King Avizandum and Queen Zubeia, and the titular character of the series. Unlike most dragons, Zym doesn't speak even as he grows into a teenager. Although he does gain the ability to talk in the series finale, with his speaking voice provided by Dante Basco, DeSena's former co-star on Avatar: The Last Airbender.
- Paula Burrows as Rayla: A teenage Moonshadow Elf assassin who teams up with Callum and Ezran in order to deliver the Dragon Prince back to his mother. In time, she and Callum begin a romantic relationship. Burrows also voices the supporting characters Opeli, Berto, and Queen Annika.
- Sasha Rojen as Crown Prince Ezran: The young son of King Harrow and Queen Sarai, the rulers of the human kingdom of Katolis, and Callum's younger half-brother. He has the telepathic ability to speak with and understand the thoughts and feelings of animals.
- Jason Simpson as Lord Viren: King Harrow's closest advisor and the High Mage of Katolis. A practitioner of dark magic, he seeks the advancement of the human race and their dominance over Xadia by any means necessary. Simpson also voices the supporting characters Barius and Terbium.
- Racquel Belmonte as Claudia: Viren's daughter, Soren's younger sister and a talented dark mage, like her father, who is loyal to him regardless of his ambitions or actions.
- Jesse Inocalla as Soren: Viren's son, Claudia's older brother, and a loyal member of the Katolian Crownguard. While boastful and immature, he is a skillful and good-hearted soldier. Inocalla also voices the supporting character Marcos.
- Erik Todd Dellums as Aaravos: An ancient Startouch Elf Archmage with mastery over all sources of magic who seeks to be freed from his prison and exact his revenge upon the world.
- Omari Newton as Corvus: A highly skilled tracker in the Standing Battalion, an army of soldiers serving General Amaya, Callum and Ezran's deaf aunt.
- Rena Anakwe as Princess Janai: A seasoned Sunfire Elf warrior and champion of her people.
- Luc Roderique as Prince Karim: A powerful Sun Mage and Janai's younger brother who strives to maintain the histories and traditions of his people. Roderique also voices the supporting character King Harrow.
- Benjamin Callins as Terrestrius "Terry": A goofy Earthblood Elf who develops a romantic relationship with Claudia.

== Episodes ==
Book	Saga	Title	Episodes	Originally released
1	The Dragon Prince	Moon	9	September 14, 2018
2	The Dragon Prince	Sky	9	February 15, 2019
3	The Dragon Prince	Sun	9	November 22, 2019
4	Mystery of Aaravos	Earth	9	November 3, 2022
5	Mystery of Aaravos	Ocean	9	July 22, 2023
6	Mystery of Aaravos	Stars	9	July 26, 2024
7	Mystery of Aaravos	Dark	9	December 19, 2024

== Production ==
=== Development ===
The series was first announced on July 10, 2018 by co-creators Aaron Ehasz and Justin Richmond. Ehasz was the head writer and co-executive producer of the animated series Avatar: The Last Airbender, and a longtime writer and story editor for Futurama, while Richmond co-directed the video game Uncharted 3: Drake's Deception. The series is produced by Wonderstorm, a multimedia production studio co-founded in 2017, by Ehasz, Richmond, and Justin Santistevan to work on both The Dragon Prince and a related video game, while the series is animated by Canadian studio Bardel Entertainment.

In November 2019, several former female employees of Riot Games and Wonderstorm accused Ehasz of asking his female employees to take care of his children without permission and for not taking women's creative ideas seriously with one anonymous accuser speculating that the accusations could have affected the show's continuation.

In July 2020, at the virtual ComicCon@Home panel "Zoom into Xadia", the series was renewed for four additional seasons (seven total) as part of a second saga subtitled Mystery of Aaravos.

In July 2024, at San Diego Comic-Con, Ehasz announced that three additional seasons (ten total) as part of a potential third saga were being considered, although they had yet to enter development or be green-lit by Netflix. The following year at San Diego Comic-Con, Ehasz announced that the planned third arc was being repurposed into a independently funded sequel series titled The Dragon King.

=== Style ===
Artistically, The Dragon Prince draws inspiration from anime. The series is created using three-dimensional computer animation. A reduced frame rate was applied to the first season to offset "floatiness"; the frame rate was adjusted for the second season in response to fan feedback. Backgrounds are done by a mix of 3D-modeling and hand-painting.

=== Writing ===
The ending for the second season changed from the original plan in order to stay true to what the characters would choose. According to Ehasz, one of the creative team's fundamental goals regarding The Dragon Prince is "to portray a fantasy world that feels more diverse and representative than fantasy worlds and stories we've seen in the past."

== Release ==
The Dragon Prince is available on the streaming service Netflix, in all territories where the streaming service is available. The first season was released on September 14, 2018. Episodes were released simultaneously, as opposed to a serialized format, to encourage binge-watching, a format which has been successful for other Netflix original series.

The first full trailer was released in July 2018 at San Diego Comic-Con and announced that the first season would premiere on September 14, 2018. In October 2018, a second season was announced and premiered on February 15, 2019. In October 2019, a third season was announced and premiered on November 22, 2019.

In July 2020, the series was renewed for four additional seasons. The fourth season premiered on November 3, 2022, beginning the series second saga. In March 2023, a teaser image for the fifth season was released which announced a mid-2023 release window. Initially set to premiere on July 27, 2023, the fifth season's release was moved forward to July 22, 2023. In November 2023, at Netflix's Geeked Week virtual event, a teaser for the sixth season was released which confirmed a 2024 release window and the sixth season later premiered on July 26, 2024. In August 2024, a teaser was released for the seventh and final season, which premiered on December 19, 2024.

In October 2025, CAKE acquired international distribution rights for all seven seasons of the series and were seeking buyers to "expand the franchise's reach across every platform".

== Reception ==
Review aggregator website Rotten Tomatoes reports that 100% of 12 critics gave the first season a positive review; the average rating is 8.2 out of 10, with the consensus reading "Magically intriguing, The Dragon Prince is a captivating fantasy adventure that has strong character development and a solid storyline." 100% of seven critics gave the second season a positive review; the average rating is 8.4 out of 10. 100% of eight critics gave the third season a positive review; the average rating is 8.8 out of 10. 100% of six critics gave the fourth season a positive review.

In an advance review of the first episode, IGN's Aaron Prune praised the series for "comfortably exploring dark story elements while giving audiences an assortment of lovable characters to engage with" and described it as a "worthwhile animated series for audiences of all ages." Reviewing the first three episodes, Alex Barasch of Slate was also positive towards the series, saying that despite the "slightly shaky animation and some markedly shakier accents", fans of fantasy or Avatar: The Last Airbender will like it. Barasch especially praised the show's inclusivity—such as King Harrow and Ezran, who are both black—and Harrow's relationship with Viren, which he described as "most compelling aspects of the show". Also reviewing the first three episodes, Gavia Baker-Whitelaw of The Daily Dot similarly reacted positively to the show's racial inclusion, writing that it "combines goofy humor with a solid basis for longterm storytelling and character development, the character designs show a deep affection for the genre". However, she criticized Rayla's accent as "the worst part of the show", along with the scarcity of female characters. Emily Ashby of Common Sense Media described the series as a "captivating fantasy tale" with positive themes and broad appeal. She also argued it was a "beautifully rendered epic animated fantasy", noted that characters kiss, said that the series is "brimming with mysticism, action, and suspense", and said it has similarities to Avatar: The Last Airbender and its spinoff sequel Avatar: The Legend of Korra.

=== LGBT themes and representation ===
==== Season 1 ====
Before the release of the show's first season, during San Diego Comic-Con in July 2018, it was revealed that the series would contain LGBT characters in it; no details or characters were provided to avoid spoilers. On the day of the first season's release, Wonderstorm issued a statement regarding the show's handling of diversity, where co-creators Aaron Ehasz and Justin Richmond described the importance of telling a story with diverse characters in it, which is something they are passionate about. To achieve their goal of creating a diverse world and characters, it was decided that they would accomplish this through a variety of methods, with some examples singled out being the inclusion of racial diversity, the portrayal of non-typical family structures, as well as people with disabilities. Alongside these forms of representation, the representation of LGBT characters was also singled out.

Regarding The Dragon Prince's diverse representation, it was stated that with some characters their arcs would "play out in ways that clearly demonstrate their difference or representation right away", but that with other characters their status as minorities would be "part of their identity, but not yet a part of their plot or storyline". Following the release of season 1, it was theorized that an unnamed elf that appears in the end credits illustrations of two episodes—dubbed "Tinker" by fans—was Runaan's boyfriend.

==== Season 2 ====
The second season of The Dragon Prince included the show's first instance of LGBT representation. The Queens of Duren—Annika and Neha—appear in flashbacks set prior to the show's beginning and are depicted as a couple, sharing a kiss on-screen; they appear in two out of nine episodes. Vice noted how the series' creators have "acknowledged their commitment to making sure [the show] doesn't use the "bury your gays" trope.

Despite this statement, in a pre-release review of the season, Michal Schick of Hypable discussed how the show's representation of these characters would likely cause debate, given that they can be viewed as falling under the "Bury your gays" trope. While Renaldo Matadeen of Comic Book Resources also acknowledged how the depiction of the Queens of Duren can fall under the "bury your gays" trope—also acknowledging fan complaints regarding this—he still praised the show's depiction of an openly lesbian couple. Similarly, The Mary Sue's Caroline Cao argued that while their depiction adheres to the "bury your gay" trope, there are still positives to be found within these characters. Heather Hogan of Autostraddle also expressed mixed feelings towards the characters, acknowledging the characters as having positive attributes, but lamenting them already being dead by the time the story begins.

Following the second season's release and the show's future in terms of LGBT representation, Ehasz stated that there are more characters—including main characters—that are "non-straight". Regarding any future LGBT relationships presented in the series, Ehasz stated that they often let the characters lead them to where they will go next, including any potential relationships that might occur. For this reason, he described revealing a character to be LGBTQ+ as "challenging", as they do not want to give the impression to the audience that these characters will go on to be in a same-sex relationship, but also acknowledged that LGBT characters and relationships are underrepresented in media. Both Ehasz and Richmond stated that under the right circumstances, and with enough time to tell the story, they would like to explore their queer characters more and have their "identities manifest in relationships and in the story"

==== Season 3 ====
The third season introduces Ethari, who is Runaan's husband. This season also introduces Kazi, who identifies as non-binary and uses they/them pronouns, but this is only revealed outside of the story through the show's Twitter account. According to lead writer Devon Giehl, the writers intended there to be romantic interest between Amaya and Janai that starts at the end of season 3, and confirmed that both characters are lesbian who like each other.

In a pre-release review of season 3, Inverse's Jake Kleinman criticized the show's LGBTQ+ representation, arguing that despite its initial promise, The Dragon Prince has never truly delivered on said promise. He criticized how the first season lacked any on-screen representation, while in season 2 the Queens of Duren only appear in flashbacks and are killed off. While Kleinman viewed the representation of Ethari and Runaan as an improvement, given that both characters are still alive by the end of the season, he found fault with Ethari's minimal role in the story.

=== Awards and nominations ===
Year	Award	Category	Nominee(s)	Result	Ref.
2020	Daytime Emmy Awards	Outstanding Children's Animated Series	Delna Bhesania, Tina Chow, Aaron Ehasz, Richard Grieve, Clint Kisker, Justin Richmond, Justin Santistevan, Giancarlo Volpe	Won	
2020	Daytime Emmy Awards	Outstanding Music Direction and Composition	Frederik Wiedmann	Nominated	
2023	GLAAD Media Awards	Outstanding Kids and Family Programming - Animated	The Dragon Prince	Nominated	
2023	Leo Awards	Best Animation Series	The Dragon Prince	Nominated	
2023	Leo Awards	Best Performance in an Animation Series	Jason Simpson	Nominated	
2023	Leo Awards	Best Performance in an Animation Series	Sasha Rojen	Nominated	
2023	Leo Awards	Best Art Direction in an Animation Series	Edison Yan	Nominated	
2023	Leo Awards	Best Direction in an Animation Series	George Samilski	Won	

== Other media ==
=== Graphic novels ===
- Through the Moon is a graphic novel written by Peter Wartman, illustrated by Xanthe Bouma and published by Graphix on October 6, 2020. Set between the third and fourth seasons, it follows Rayla's attempt to enter the Spirit World at the Moon Nexus to find out what happened to her missing parents, Lain and Tiadrin, and her guardian Runaan.
- Bloodmoon Huntress is a graphic novel written by Nicole Andelfinger, illustrated by Felia Hanakata and published by Graphix on July 19, 2022. It was first announced in March 2021. Set before the events of the television series, it follows a young Rayla after her parents leave her to assume their duty and her attempts to rescue a young Skywing elf during a Blood Moon.
- Puzzle House is a graphic novel written by Peter Wartman, illustrated by Felia Hanakata and published by Graphix on August 1, 2023. It was first announced at the Dragon Prince panel at San Diego Comic-Con@Home in 2021. Set before the events of the television series, it follows Soren and Claudia as they investigate the residence of Viren's former mentor Kpp'Ar, known as the Puzzle House.
- Dreamer's Nightmare is a graphic novel written by Nicole Andelfinger, illustrated by Felia Hanakata and published by Graphix on October 1, 2024. It was first announced at the Dragon Prince panel at New York Comic Con in 2023. Set before the events of the television series, it follows Callum and Ezran's attempts to quell a storm that is causing nightmares to haunt the town of Noct.

=== Novelizations ===
- Book One: Moon is a novelization of the first season written by Aaron Ehasz and Melanie McGanney Ehasz and published by Scholastic on June 2, 2020.
- Book Two: Sky is a novelization of the second season written by Aaron Ehasz and Melanie McGanney Ehasz and published by Scholastic on August 3, 2021.
- Book Three: Sun was a planned novelization of the third season written by Aaron Ehasz and Melanie McGanney Ehasz. In August 2024, despite the draft having been completed, it was confirmed to have been canceled by the publisher Scholastic.

=== Video game ===
Concurrently with the series, Wonderstorm began developing a cooperative action role-playing game video game in 2019 under the working title Project Arcanum. It expands on the plot of the television series with several of its major characters being playable throughout the game. In November 2023, at the Netflix Geeked Week virtual event, the first gameplay trailer was shown under the new title The Dragon Prince: Xadia. It was released on iOS and Android on July 30, 2024. On December 17, 2024, The Dragon Prince: Xadia was announced to be shutting down and was removed from the Netflix games library the following day.

=== Miscellaneous ===
- Callum's Spellbook is a trade paperback book written by Tracey West and published by Scholastic on March 3, 2020. It acts as an in-universe notebook written from Callum's perspective during the events of the first three seasons.
- The Art of The Dragon Prince is an artbook written by Aaron Ehasz and published by Dark Horse Books on August 18, 2020. It features behind-the-scenes information and concept art for the first three seasons.
- The Dragon Prince: Battlecharged is a card-based arena battle tabletop game featuring eight characters from the series and was published by Brotherwise Games on September 22, 2021.
- Tales of Xadia is a tabletop role-playing game that was published by Fandom Tabletop on March 29, 2022. It began its playtesting stage in 2020, with pre-orders having been opened in February 2021. The game features various storylines and original characters set in the established Dragon Prince canon that tie into the main television series.
- The Dragon Prince: Reflections are two volumes of canonical short stories that were released online on the official The Dragon Prince website, thedragonprince.com. They were primarily written by Devon Giehl, Kris James, and Michal Schick with additional contributions by Joe Corcoran, Eugene Ramos, and Paige VanTassell, and were illustrated by Caleb Thomas and Emily Marzonie. The first volume was published between June 21, 2022, and October 25, 2022, while the second volume was published between April 25, 2023, and July 21, 2023.

== Planned sequel ==
On July 24, 2025, at San Diego Comic-Con, The Dragon King sequel series was announced to be in early development following the conclusion of the final season of The Dragon Prince on Netflix. To independently fund development and find a distributor for the series, a crowdfunding campaign was launched on the Kickstarter platform by Wonderstorm on September 16, 2025, alongside a brief teaser trailer. By September 18, the Kickstarter campaign had "already earned double its original $250,000 goal, with backers pledging more than $570,000". At the conclusion of the campaign on October 16, over $1 million had been raised, surpassing all the initial stretch goals.

The series is set seven years after the conclusion of The Dragon Prince and repurposes its previously planned third arc into a standalone story. Head writer and co-creator of The Dragon Prince Aaron Ehasz is set to return alongside co-creator Justin Richmond and series director Villads Spansberg. Voice actors Jack DeSena, Paula Burrows, and Racquel Belmonte are set to reprise their roles as Callum, Rayla, and Claudia, respectively. Voice actor Dante Basco will reprise his role as Azymondias after guest-starring in the final episode of The Dragon Prince, and Liam O'Brien was announced to have joined the cast in the main role of Luna Devorans.
