= Champion (disambiguation) =

A champion is a first-place winner in a competition, along with other definitions discussed in the article.

Champion, Champions, or The Champion may also refer to:

== Brands and enterprises ==
- Champion (sportswear), a clothing manufacturer
- Champion (spark plug), a brand of ignition system components
- Champion (supermarket), a defunct French supermarket chain
- Champion (automobile), a German producer of small cars
- Champion Air, defunct American charter airline
- Champion Aircraft, a former light aircraft manufacturer
- Champion Bridge Co., an Ohio-based bridge manufacturer
- Champion Energy, a Houston-based retail electric provider (REP)
- Champion Homes, a modular homes manufacturing company
- Studebaker Champion, an automobile

== Art, entertainment, and media ==
=== Fictional entities ===
- Champion of the Universe, a Marvel Comics character
- Champion the Wonder Horse, Gene Autry's horse as portrayed in movies and television shows
- Champion, a dog in the television sitcom Parks and Recreation
- Champions (1975 team), a Marvel Comics superhero team that debuted in 1975
- Champions (2016 team), a Marvel Comics superhero team that debuted in 2016
- Champions (Raid: Shadow Legends), a category of characters in Raid: Shadow Legends
- The Champion, a transcendent class in the MMORPG Ragnarok Online
- Champions, a group of characters in The Legend of Zelda franchise

=== Films ===
- The Champion (1915 film), a Charlie Chaplin film
- The Champion (1943 film), an Italian film directed by Carlo Borghesio
- Champion (1949 film), an American boxing drama starring Kirk Douglas
- The Champion (1973 film), a Hong Kong film
- The Champions (1983 film), a Hong Kong film
- Champions (1984 film), a UK film by John Irvin, starring John Hurt, based on the life of Bob Champion
- The Mighty Ducks (film), 1992, released as Champions in the UK and Australia
- Champions (1997 film), an American film by Peter Gathings Bunche
- Champion (2000 film), a Hindi film directed by Padam Kumar
- Champion (2002 film), a South Korean film about boxer Duk Koo Kim
- Champion (2003 film), an Indian Bengali film about sports
- Champion (2017 film), an American film starring Gary Graham
- Champion (2018 film), a South Korean film starring Ma Dong-seok
- Champions (2018 film), a Spanish film natively titled Campeones
  - Champions (2021 film), a Saudi Arabian-Spanish film directed by Manuel Calvo, a remake of the above
  - Champions (2023 film), an American film starring Woody Harrelson, a remake of the above
- Champion (2019 film), an Indian Tamil-language film
- The Champion (2020 film), a Polish-language film
- Champion (2022 film), an Indian Kannada-language film starring Sunny Leone

=== Television ===
==== Episodes ====
- "Champion", Apple & Onion season 1, episode 40 (2020)
- "Champion", Baki the Grappler season 1, episode 17 (2001)
- "Champion", Beast Tamer episode 12 (2022)
- "Champion", Dr. Christian season 1, episode 36 (1957)
- "Champion", Heartstrings (South Korean) episode 3 (2011)
- "Champion", Lassie (1954) season 3, episode 20 (1957)
- "Champion", On the Rocks (American) episode 6 (1975)
- "Champion", Transformers: Cybertron episode 19 (2005)
- "Champions", American Chronicles episode 13 (1990)
- "Champions", Kengan Ashura season 1 part 1, episode 20 (2019)
- "Champions", Legion of Super Heroes season 1, episode 5 (2006)
- "Champions", Skate-Leading Stars episode 8 (2021)
- "Champions", The Dumping Ground series 7, episode 20 (2019)
- "Chapter 3: Champion", The OA season 1, episode 3 (2016)
- "The Champion", Climax! season 1, episode 20 (1955)
- "The Champion", Dick Turpin series 1, episode 3 (1979)
- "The Champion", Dr. Finlay's Casebook series 4, episode 2 (1965)
- "The Champion", Dynasty (Australian) series 1, episode 8 (1970)
- "The Champion", Fatty and George episode 4 (1981)
- "The Champion", Mo Dao Zu Shi season 1, episode 7 (2018)
- "The Champion", The Adventures of Robin Hood series 4, episode 23 (1959)
- "The Champion", V: The Series episode 14 (1985)
- "Williams: The Champions", Extraordinary People series 2, episode 1 (1993)

==== Shows ====
- Champion (Canadian TV series), a Canadian sports biography television series
- Champion (British TV series), a musical British television series
- Champions (Indian TV series), a 2013–2014 Tamil-language talent show
- Champions (American TV series), a 2018 sitcom that aired on NBC
- The Adventures of Champion (TV series) (1955–1956), a children's TV series (known as Champion the Wonder Horse on British TV)
- The Champions (miniseries), a 1986 Canadian documentary about Pierre Trudeau and René Lévesque
- The Champion (TV series), a 2004 Singaporean Chinese MediaCorp idol drama
- The Champions (1968–1969), a British espionage/science fiction adventure series
- America's Got Talent: The Champions (2019–2020), a spin-off to the American talent series, America's Got Talent
- Britain's Got Talent: The Champions (2019), a spin-off to the British talent series, Britain's Got Talent

=== Games and toys ===
- Champions (role-playing game), a game to simulate a superhero comic book world
  - Champions Online, a 2009 MMORPG loosely based on the above
- Champion, a Beanie Baby bear made by Ty, Inc.
- Champion, a jumping piece in the game of Omega Chess

=== Music ===
==== Groups and labels ====
- Champion (band), an American hardcore band
- Champion Records (1925), and its successor label
- Champion Records (1950s), a Nashville, Tennessee-based label
- Champion Records (1980), a British record label

==== Albums ====
- Champion (Beckah Shae album), 2014
- Champion (Bishop Briggs album), 2019
- Champion (RuPaul album), 2009
- Champion (The Audition album), 2008
- Champion (EP), by Brother Ali, 2004
- * Champion, by Bif Naked, 2024
- Champion, by Peter Cornell, 2014
- The Champion, by Carman, 1985
- The Champion: The Hits, by Nigerian rapper ELDee, 2009

==== Songs ====
- "Champion" (Ace Hood song), 2009
- "Champion" (Agnes song), 2006
- "Champion" (Bethel Music and Dante Bowe song), 2020
- "Champion" (Chipmunk song), 2011
- "Champion" (Clemens song), 2010
- "Champion" (Clement Marfo & The Frontline song), 2012
- "Champion" (Fall Out Boy song), 2017
- "Champion" (Kanye West song), 2007
- "Champion" (Nicki Minaj song), 2012
- "Champions" (GOOD Music song), 2016
- "Champions" (Paid in Full song), 2002
- "Champions" (Usher and Rubén Blades song), 2016
- "The Champion" (song), by Carrie Underwood featuring Ludacris, 2018
- "World Cup (Champions)", by IShowSpeed alternately titled as "Champion", 2026
- "Champion", by Alice, 1978
- "Champion", by Blackpink from the 2026 EP Deadline
- "Champion", by Buju Banton from the 2001 album Ultimate Collection
- "Champion", by The Chevin from the 2012 album Borderland
- "Champion", coronation song selection for 2015 American Idol XIV runner-up Clark Beckham
- "Champion, by Corbin Bleu from Speed of Light
- "Champion", by Dwayne "DJ" Bravo
- "Champion", by Flipsyde
- "Champion", by Grinspoon from the 1998 album Guide to Better Living
- "Champion", by Sia from the 2024 album Reasonable Woman
- "Champion", by Three Days Grace from the 2022 album Explosions
- "Champions", by James Blunt from the 2019 album Once Upon a Mind
- "Champions", by O.A.R. featuring B.o.B
- "Champions", by Sumi Jo
- "The Champion", by The Score, 2020
- "The Champions", by DJ Kay Slay from the 2003 album The Streetsweeper, Vol. 1

=== Periodicals ===
- The Champion, the magazine of the National Association of Criminal Defense Lawyers
- The Champion Magazine, 1916–1917 magazine founded by Fenton Johnson (poet)
- The Daily Champion, English language newspaper in Nigeria
- The Moree Champion, previously The North West Champion, in Moree, New South Wales
- The Sligo Champion, weekly regional newspaper published in Sligo, Ireland
- The Western Champion (Parkes), weekly newspaper published in Parkes, New South Wales
- The Western Champion (Queensland), weekly newspaper published in Queensland, Australia

=== Other uses in art and entertainment ===
- The Champion (painting), 1824, by Charles Lock Eastlake
- Champion (novel), 2013, by Marie Lu
- Champion (opera), a 2013 biographical/philosophical work on Emile Griffith's fatal boxing match
- The Champion (story paper), a British comic book which ran from 1922 until 1955

== Sports ==
- Champion (sportswear), a manufacturer of various classes of clothing
- Champion Stadium, a baseball stadium at Walt Disney World
- Champion Stakes, a thoroughbred horse race in Great Britain
- PGA Champions Tour, a golf circuit for seniors
- The Champions Classic, a golf tournament on the Champions Tour from 1983 to 1985
- Champion (horse) (1797–?), British Thoroughbred racehorse and sire

== Titles or roles ==
- Champion of/for, one who supports or advocates for a cause or constituency, as in patient advocacy
- King's Champion/Queen's Champion, a British office and its incumbent

== People with the name ==
- Champion (surname)
- Champion Jack Dupree (died 1992), American blues pianist
- DJ Champion, stage name of Maxime Morin, a Quebec electronic musician

== Places ==
=== United States ===
- Champion (VTA), a light rail station in San Jose, California
- Champion, Michigan
- Champion, Nebraska
- Champion, New York
- Champion, Wisconsin
- Champion Township, Michigan
- Champion Township, Minnesota
- Champion Township, Trumbull County, Ohio

=== Elsewhere ===
- Champion, Namur, Belgium
- Champion, Alberta, Canada

== Transportation ==
- Champion (train), a defunct train service between New York and Florida
- Aeronca Champion, a light aircraft
- Avid Champion, an ultralight aircraft
- HMS Champion, the name of five Royal Navy ships
- USS Champion, the name of several US Navy ships

== Other uses ==
- Champion (apple), a hybrid cultivar crossed in Czech republic
- Champion (role variant), a personality type of the Keirsey Temperament Sorter
- "Champion land", another term for the open field system used in medieval and early modern Europe
- Champion (horse) (1797–?), British Thoroughbred racehorse and sire
- Champion warfare

== See also ==
- Champ (disambiguation)
- Championship
- Champions League (disambiguation)
- Champs (disambiguation)
- Champignon
