= Chump =

Chump or The Chumps may refer to:

== Arts and entertainment ==
=== Films ===
- The Chump (1921 film), a short starring Billy Bletcher
- The Chump (1934 film), with Hal Skelly, Lina Basquette and Sally Starr
- The Chump, a 2002 film directed by Sam Fell

=== Music ===
- "Chump", a track on the album Dookie by Green Day
- "Chump", a track on the album Novelty (1992) by Jawbox

=== Television ===
- CHUMP (Criminal Headquarters for Underworld Master Plan), an espionage organization in the 1970s television show Lancelot Link, Secret Chimp
- "The Chump" (The Office), an episode of the American sitcom The Office

== Other uses ==
- Chump, a lamb meat cut (UK)
- W Chump and Sons, a television production company founded in 2015 that produced The Grand Tour
- The Chumps, nickname for NASA Astronaut Group 20

== See also ==
- Champ (disambiguation)
- Champs (disambiguation)
- Chump Change (disambiguation)
