= Champ =

Champ, CHAMP or The Champ may refer to:

== Arts and entertainment ==
=== Fictional characters ===
- Champ (cartoon character), an animated dog introduced in 1960
- The Champ, played on radio and created by Jake Edwards
- Champ the Dog, from the Postal video game series
- Champ, the mascot of Louisiana Tech University
- Champion "Champ" Kind, from Anchorman: The Legend of Ron Burgundy

=== Film and television ===
- The Champ (1931 film), directed by King Vidor
- The Champ (1979 film), a remake of the 1931 film
- Champ (2011 film), a 2011 South Korean film
- Champ, a South Korea cable channel, originally a joint venture of Daewon Media and CJ Media

=== Music ===
==== Albums ====
- The Champ (Jimmy Smith album), 1956
- The Champ (Sonny Stitt album), 1974
- Champ (album), 2010, by Tokyo Police Club

==== Songs ====
- "The Champ", a 1951 composition by jazz trumpeter Dizzy Gillespie
- "The Champ" (The Mohawks song), 1968
- "The Champ", a song by Ghostface Killah on the 2006 album Fishscale
- "The Champ" (Nelly song), 2011

== People ==
- Champ (nickname)
- Champ (surname)
- Champ Butler (1926–1992), American singer
- Champ Lyons (born 1940), justice of the Supreme Court of Alabama
- Champ Seibold (1911–1971), American football player

== Places ==
- Champ, Missouri, United States, a village
- Champ, Audrain County, Missouri, an unincorporated community
- Champ Island, a European Russian arctic island

== Science ==
- CHAMP (satellite), launched in 2000
- John George Champion, botanical abbreviation Champ.
- Counter-electronics High Power Microwave Advanced Missile Project, a directed energy weapon demonstrator

== Vehicles ==
- Austin Champ, a 1950s military and civilian jeep-like vehicle
- Plymouth Champ, a rebadged variant of the Dodge Colt subcompact car
- Studebaker Champ, a pickup truck produced from 1960 to 1964
- Aeronca Champion, a light aircraft

== Other uses ==
- Champ (dog), Joe Biden's family pet
- Champ (folklore), a monster supposedly living in Lake Champlain
- Champ (food), an Irish dish of mashed potatoes and scallions
- CHAMP (mathematics outreach program), in the Houston, Texas area
- Fender Champ, a guitar amplifier
- Samsung Champ, a phone
- Four square, a game, sometimes called Champ
- Champ, a type of burger at Jollibee restaurants

== See also ==
- Champion (disambiguation)
- Champs (disambiguation)
- Chaamp, a 2017 Indian Bengali-language film by Raj Chakraborty
