= Champion (comics) =

Champion, in comics, may refer to:

- Champion of the Universe, a Marvel Comics character and a member of The Elders
- The Champion (comics), a British comic
- Champion, two DC Comics characters, the second of which was an alias used by Hercules

It may also refer to:

- Champions (1975 team), a Marvel Comics superhero team that debuted in 1975
- Champions (2016 team), a Marvel Comics superhero team that debuted in 2016

== See also ==
- Champion (disambiguation)
