= Campione =

Campione may refer to:

- Campione d'Italia, comune of the province of Como in the Lombardy region of Italy
- Campione!, Japanese light novel series written by Jō Taketsuki and illustrated by Sikorski
- Campione 2000, official song of the European football championship 2000 in the Netherlands and Belgium

== Persons ==
- Bunny Campione, English antiques expert
- Elaine Campione, Ontario woman who murdered her two children in Barrie, Ontario

== See also ==
- Champion (disambiguation)
