= Champ (surname) =

Champ is a surname. Notable people with the surname include:

- Cameron Champ (born 1995), American golfer
- Éric Champ (born 1962), French former rugby union player
- Henry Champ (1937–2012), Canadian broadcast journalist
- Leanne Champ (born 1983), English football player and coach
- Patrick Champ (born 1954), French footballer
- Paul Champ, French sports journalist and author
- Ricky Champ (born 1980), English actor
- Vince Champ (born 1961), American comedian and convicted serial rapist
- William Champ (1808–1892), English soldier and politician, first Premier of Tasmania
