= Champs =

Champs may refer to:

== Music ==
- The Champs, a U.S. instrumental music group
- Champs (Brazilian band), a Brazilian boy band
- Champs (British band), a British folk- and indie rock-influenced band
- The Fucking Champs, a U.S. progressive heavy metal band previously known as The Champs
- "Champs", a song on Wire's 1977 album Pink Flag

== Places in France ==
- Champs, Aisne, in the Aisne département
- Champs, Orne, in the Orne département
- Champs, Puy-de-Dôme, in the Puy-de-Dôme département
- Champs-Romain, in the Dordogne département
- Champs-sur-Marne, in the Seine-et-Marne département
- Champs-sur-Tarentaine-Marchal, in the Cantal département
- Champs-sur-Yonne, in the Yonne département
- Les Champs-de-Losque, in the Calvados département
- Champs-Élysées, literally the "Elysian fields", a broad avenue in Paris

== Sport ==
- Champs (brand), a Brazilian sporting goods manufacturer
- Champs Sports, a subsidiary of Foot Locker, Inc.
- Inter-Secondary Schools Boys and Girls Championships, known as Champs

== Other ==
- CHAMPS (China) (Chongqing, Hefei, Anshan, Ma'anshan, Pingdingshan and Shenyang)
- Champs (film), a 2014 documentary film
- Champs (TV series), an American sitcom
- Charter High School of the Arts (CHAMPS), a performing arts high school in Van Nuys, California

== See also ==
- Champ (disambiguation)
- Champion (disambiguation)
