= Patrick Champ =

French footballer (born 1954)

Personal information
- Date of birth: 29 June 1954 (age 72)
- Place of birth: Nîmes, France
- Height: 1.78 m (5 ft 10 in)
- Position: Defender

Senior career*
Years	Team	Apps	(Gls)
1972–1976	Nîmes B		
1976–1978	Nîmes		
1978–1979	Alès		
1979–1983	Rumilly		

Managerial career
- 1979–1983: Rumilly (player-manager)
- 1984–1990: Nîmes B
- 1990–1993: Nîmes (youth)
- 1992–1993: Lunel
- 1995–1996: Vergèze (director of sports)
- 1996–1999: Aigues-Mortes
- 1999–2000: Alès B
- 2000: Nîmes B
- 2001–2004: Nîmes B
- 2003: → Nîmes (caretaker)
- * Club domestic league appearances and goals

Patrick Champ (born 29 June 1954) is a French former football player and manager.
