= Champion (Canadian TV series) =

- Presented by: Michael Magee
- Country of origin: Canada
- Original language: English
- No. of seasons: 1

Production
- Producer: Rick Rice
- Running time: 15 minutes

Original release
- Network: CBC Television
- Release: 4 January – 17 April 1969

Champion is a Canadian sports biography television series that aired on CBC Television in 1969.

== Premise ==
Michael Magee hosted this series of biographies on prominent Canadian athletes.

== Scheduling ==
This 15-minute series was broadcast on Saturdays at 10:45 p.m. (Eastern) following Hockey Night in Canada from 4 January to 17 April 1969.
