= List of Mo Dao Zu Shi episodes =

Mo Dao Zu Shi (Chinese: 魔道祖师; pinyin: Mó Dào Zǔ Shī; lit. 'Demonic Path Ancestral Master') is a donghua ONA series aired from 2018 to 2021, based on the novel of the same name written by Mo Xiang Tong Xiu (墨香铜臭). The series depicts a fictional Xianxia (仙侠) world where humans attempt to cultivate to a state of immortality, known as Xian (仙). The animation was produced by Tencent Penguin Pictures and B.C May Pictures, in collaboration with 729 Voice Studio.

The first season, titled Qian Chen Pian (前尘篇), aired from July 9 to October 6, 2018, on Tencent Video for 15 episodes. The second season, titled Xian Yun Pian (羡云篇), aired from August 3 to 31, 2019, for 8 episodes. A chibi series, titled Mo Dao Zu Shi Q, aired from July 31, 2020, to January 29, 2021, and ran for 30 episodes. The third and final season, titled Wán Jié Piān (完结篇), aired from August 7 to October 16, 2021, for 12 episodes.

The series won the Gold Award for "The Best Serial Animation" at the 15th China Animation Golden Dragon Awards (第十五届中国动漫金龙奖). It also won "Best New Animation" at Xinguang Award (新光奖); the 7th China Xi'an International Original Animation Competition.

== Series overview ==
| Season | Episodes | Originally released | |
| Season | Episodes | First released | Last released |
|---|---|---|---|
| 1 | 15 | July 9, 2018 | October 6, 2018 |
| 2 | 8 | August 3, 2019 | August 31, 2019 |
| 3 | 12 | August 7, 2021 | October 16, 2021 |

== Episodes ==
=== Season 1 (2018) ===
| No. overall | No. in season | Title | Directed by | Written by | Original release date |
|---|---|---|---|---|---|
| 1 | 1 | "Banishing Evil, Part 1" | Xiong Ke | Liang Sha, Liu Xing & Zhu Ke | July 9, 2018 |
For many years, cultivation clans had failed to summon the Yiling Patriarch Wei Wuxian, whom was believed to be killed by his brother Jiang Cheng. However, he is finally incarnated into the body of Mo Xuanyu through a sacrificial ritual, who was a young man full of hatred for his abusive family members. While Wei Wuxian carries on to exact revenge on the Mo Family as per request, he meets the new generation of the Lan sect and finds himself in a zombie mystery. When the situation is deemed too difficult to be defeated alone, Lan Sizhui and Lan Jingyi call for help from any nearby seniors, ultimately attracting the attention of Wei Wuxian's long-time acquaintance.
| 2 | 2 | "Banishing Evil, Part 2" | Xiong Ke | Liang Sha, Liu Xing & Zhu Ke | July 9, 2018 |
After Lan Wangji successfully stops the mysterious arm, Wei Wuxian escapes to prevent being spotted by him. He arrives at the nearby Mt. Dafan and meets another young disciple, Jin Ling from the Jin sect. The two have a heated argument which causes Jiang Cheng to come by. Wei Wuxian then learns that Jin Ling is the nephew of Jiang Cheng, whom was left orphaned because of Wei Wuxian's past mistakes. Due to being in Mo Xuanyu's body, Jiang Cheng was unable to recognise Wei Wuxian until the latter starts using his demonic abilities to save everyone from the escaped arm, which summons the Ghost General Wen Ning. While he suspects Wei Wuxian, the latter plays dumb and acts as the notorious cut-sleeve Mo Xuanyu to prevent his cover from being blown. As Lan Wangji also has the same suspicion, he protects Wei Wuxian and even offers to take him back to Gusu when Wei Wuxian speaks of his liking for him, catching Wei Wuxian by surprise. At the end of the episode, the timeline changes to twenty years ago, starting the flashbacks of Wei Wuxian's teenage years.
| 3 | 3 | "Pursuing Studies" | Xiong Ke | Liang Sha, Liu Xing & Zhu Ke | July 14, 2018 |
Wei Wuxian, Jiang Cheng, and their friend Nie Huaisang, start their education in the prestigious Cloud Recesses to become better cultivators. They meet the top disciple Lan Wangji, whom Wei Wuxian confessed he had angered upon his arrival in Gusu. Due to Wei Wuxian's playfulness, he broke three rules during his first encounter with Lan WangJi, and thus is resented by both the latter and the teacher Lan Qiren. However, despite his mischief, he is shown to be a knowledgeable student, although his solutions involve the use of the forbidden demonic path. He is then punished to copy passages in the Library Pavilion and to be supervised by Lan Wangji, much to Wei Wuxian's dismay as he does not chat with him. One month later, Wei Wuxian finishes the punishment and draws a portrait of Lan Wangji as a farewell gift. But this is just another of his pranks as Lan Wangji was drawn femininely. Wei Wuxian also replaces Lan Wangji's poetry book with an erotic art book, causing a fight to break out in the library as Wei Wuxian teases him continuously. On the other hand, the Wen sect causes trouble for the Lan sect as dangerous water ghouls are driven downwards to Gusu's waters.
| 4 | 4 | "Water Ghoul" | Xiong Ke | Liang Sha, Liu Xing & Zhu Ke | July 21, 2018 |
The disciples of the Cloud Recesses are brought along to Biling Lake to exorcise the water ghouls that had mysteriously appeared recently. While they pass by Caiyi Town, they discover that water ghouls had also arrived in town. The disciples are puzzled as the corpses were not recognised by the locals and appear in a place where they did not drown in. As Biling Lake is overflowing with resentful energy, Wei Wuxian comes up with the idea to harvest these energy to counterattack the water ghouls, causing Jiang Cheng to stop him using the threat of copying more passages. Subsequently, Wei Wuxian discovers a water ghoul hiding below Lan Wangji's boat, causing Lan Xichen to be impressed by his wits. The Waterborne Abyss then starts attacking, causing some boats to capsize. While Wei Wuxian is saving one of the disciples, he is dragged into the water and met with resentful energy up-close for the first time. Thankfully, he is pulled out of the water by Lan Wangji before anything can happen. With the problem at hand finally solved, the disciples start to suspect the Wen sect's malicious intent.
| 5 | 5 | "Heretic Path" | Xiong Ke | Liang Sha, Liu Xing & Zhu Ke | July 28, 2018 |
Wei Wuxian sneaks out at night again to enjoy his favourite wine, but is caught by Lan Wangji for the second time. As Wei Wuxian does not want to give up, he fights with him and causes them both to fall outside of the Cloud Recesses, which is a rule broken. This causes them to be punished by being beaten. After hearing of a way to relieve the pain, Wei Wuxian joins Lan Wangji in the Cold Spring. Wei Wuxian uses this as an attempt to make friends with him, but Lan Wangji continues to refuse. Later, they hear a strange sound and rushes to defeat the feral zombies that have escaped. Lan Wangji holds up until Jiang Cheng and another disciple comes to give Lan Wangji his guqin, and successfully defeats the zombies. On the other hand, Wei Wuxian does not have a weapon and faces difficulties at his end. While fighting, he sees a rabbit and protects it while running from the zombies. One of them gets too close and resentful energy starts entering his body. Jiang Cheng comes just in time to return him his sword and they defeat the remaining zombies. Jiang Cheng then gets mad Wei Wuxian attempted to harness the resentful energy, which is forbidden and warrants his execution, but Wei promises not to do so again, having resisted its influence. After the credits roll, Wei Wuxian finds another rabbit and brings both to Lan Wangji in hopes that the latter will adopt them. But Lan Wangji was too prideful to accept until Wei Wuxian decides to find someone who can roast them. Lan Wangji then agrees to adopt the rabbits and Wei Wuxian teases his indecisiveness. Wei Wuxian then points out how the rabbits are atop each other and Lan Wangji calls him obscene, making Wei Wuxian stutter about what Lan Wangji might be thinking of.
| 6 | 6 | "Returning Home" | Xiong Ke | Liang Sha, Liu Xing & Zhu Ke | August 4, 2018 |
While the disciples learn about Lan sect's history, the topic of love raises a question towards Jin Zixuan about which lady he thinks is the fairest. Wei Wuxian comments that Jin Zixuan will choose his fiancee Jiang Yanli, but Jin Zixuan badmouths her. As her brothers, both Wei Wuxian and Jiang Cheng get offended and Wei Wuxian starts a fight with him. The fight causes their father Jiang Fengmian to personally come to Cloud Recesses to bring Wei Wuxian home. Back at Yunmeng, Wei Wuxian is finally reunited with his adoptive family, but his mother Yu Ziyuan despises him, mostly due to Jiang Fengmian's favouritism over an adopted son. The situation gets worse when the marriage is called off and Yu Ziyuan blames it on Wei Wuxian, despite Jiang Fengmian's reasoning. Yu Ziyuan subsequently argues with Jiang Fengmian, straining their relationship further. Wei Wuxian overhears the argument and blames himself for the disputes between the two pairs. He apologises to Jiang Yanli but she insists that love should not be forced if not mutual. One year later, Jiang Cheng returns to Yunmeng after finishing his studies. As the brothers talk, Jiang Chen tells him an archery tournament between the cultivation clans will be held in the Nightless City - the home of the Wen Sect.
| 7 | 7 | "The Champion" | Xiong Ke | Liang Sha, Liu Xing & Zhu Ke | August 11, 2018 |
Wei Wuxian gets lost finding the archery field in the Nightless City and meets Wen Ning while he was practicing his archery. Wei Wuxian asks him for directions and makes an acquaintance. At the field, every capable archers and the respective sect leaders gather for the Grand Discussion that is hosted by the Wen sect this year. When Wei Wuxian spotted Lan Wangji, he pulls a prank on him into thinking his headband is slanted, making the latter annoyed. The clan leaders take their seats, the leader of the Wen Clan sitting higher than the leaders of the other clans in an obvious power play. Right before the competition starts, Wen Ning is picked on by Wen Chao, the Wen Clan's heir, in which Wei Wuxian steps in to defend his archery skills. However, when told to prove his skills, Wen Ning fails to make a good shot due to nerves. But Wei Wuxian continues to praise him, which leads to Wen Ning's great trust in him. During the competition, Wen Chao breaks his own rules and causes an argument to break out. When a disciple badmouths him, Wen Chao attacks him with no mercy. Lan Wangji appears in time and saves him, making Wen Chao leave in embarrassment. Wei Wuxian notices that Lan Wangji's headband is indeed slanted this time, but Lan Wangji refuses to believe. Out of kindness, Wei Wuxian tries to straighten it for him, but pulls the entire band off instead. This makes Lan Wangji really angry and leave the competition early. The competition ended with Wei Wuxian getting first place and Lan Wangji in fourth, leaving Jiang Cheng, who did not place, jealous, and Wen's clan leader (as none of his clan placed) displeased.
| 8 | 8 | "The Indoctrination" | Xiong Ke | Liang Sha, Liu Xing & Zhu Ke | August 18, 2018 |
Wen Chao reports back to the Wen sect leader Wen Ruohan about the incident at the archery competition, stating that the four clans had tricked him. This leads to the start of a series of malicious plans to take control over the four clans. The Cloud Recesses is burned down by Wen Xu, leaving the Lan sect leader gravely injured and Lan Xichen to disappear without a trace. The Wen sect also orders for disciples to be dispatched to Qishan as an attempt to keep them hostage. Their swords are confiscated and they are forced to search for the cave that Wen Chao wants to night-hunt in. Anyone who disobeys will have their Golden Core melted by Core-melting Hand Wen Zhuliu. When Wei Wuxian learns of the burning of the Cloud Recesses, he offers to carry Lan Wangji on his back as his leg is injured. The latter once again refuses. During the search, Wei Wuxian saves Mianmian who is being harassed by Wen Chao, stalling him so his lover Wang Lingjiao can see his actions. In the cave, Mianmian is offered as a sacrifice to lure the beast out, but some disciples disobey and protected her instead, causing Wen Chao to order his people to kill them. The commotion from the resulting fight causes the beast to wake. Wang Lingjiao attempts to brand Mianmian's face with her branding iron despite the chaos but Wei Wuxian gets in the way, being branded on the chest.
| 9 | 9 | "Same Boat" | Xiong Ke | Liang Sha, Liu Xing & Zhu Ke | August 25, 2018 |
With the beast angered, the Wen sect escapes and block the cave entrance, preventing anyone else from leaving. Lan Wangji points out there is another opening as there are maple leaves in the pond despite the lack of trees, meaning there's a tunnel connected to the outside in the pond. As the beast returns to sleep, Wei Wuxian and Jiang Cheng dive into the water to search for the way out. However, Wei Wuxian accidentally awakens the beast when a body surprises him, but Jiang Cheng emerges with good news. Wei Wuxian stays to hold off the beast with a flame array while the others escape. Su She, while attempting to shoot the creature, accidentally shoots him in the shoulder with an arrow, causing Wei Wuxian's powers to weaken faster. The scent of blood incites the beast, which he uses to distract it so Jiang Cheng can help the last few escape. Lan Wangji saves Wei Wuxian, the beast biting his leg, but the two hide from it. However, its thrashing has caused the tunnel to the outside to collapse and those who escaped are attacked by Wen trying to kill them. They tend to each other's wounds and Lan Wangji tearfully confesses about his worry for his family. They decide to wait for three days to regain their strength before attempting to fight the Tortoise of Carnage by themselves. They attempt to fight the beast with the Lan sect's Killer String Technique. When Wei Wuxian dives in to lure the beast, he is drawn to a mysterious sword deep within full of resentful energy. He struggles to control the resentful energy and is swallowed by the monster. Working with Lan Wangji outside, they kill the beast. However, an unconscious Wei Wuxian sinks through the water, the sword vanishing in the depths of the pond.
| 10 | 10 | "Disaster Arises" | Xiong Ke | Liang Sha, Liu Xing & Zhu Ke | September 1, 2018 |
Lan Wangji pulls Wei Wuxian out of the water. In an attempt to keep him awake, Lan Wangji plays a song he has composed specially for him, although the latter passes out anyway. Wei Wuxian wakes up in his own room after being saved by Jiang Cheng. He then learns the Lan sect leader has died and the Wen sect has taken all the credit for killing the beast. When Jiang Fengmian and Yu Ziyuan comes to visit, the family once again has an argument over Jiang Fengmian's unfair treatment to Jiang Cheng. When the parents leave, Jiang Cheng gets angry at his own father for never taking him seriously as a Jiang and recounts how he came back to Yunmeng with great difficulty. Wei Wuxian promises him he is worthy to be the next clan leader and he will be his subordinate, just like their own fathers, easing the tensions between the two. The Wen sect continues with their plan to set Supervisory Offices in every clans. Wang Lingjiao comes to Yunmeng to demand Yu Ziyuan to punish Wei Wuxian with Zidian. Without Jiang Fengmian around, Jiang Cheng is unable to stop her. Wei WuXian silently takes a whipping, hoping the Wen will then be satisfied and leave the Jiang alone. Wang Lingjiao afterwards tells Madame Yu to cut off one of Wei Wuxian's hands, which she seems to agree to until Wang Lingjiao tells her she will head the Supervision Office at the Lotus Pier and be given authority over Madame Yu. Then Madame Yu strikes her for not knowing her place.
| 11 | 11 | "Mountain Collapse" | Xiong Ke | Liang Sha, Liu Xing & Zhu Ke | September 8, 2018 |
The Wen sect start to attack the Lotus Pier and its shield formation. The barrier is brought down when Wen Zhuliu kills the Jiang maintaining it and the Wen unleash a barrage of flame arrows that set fire to the Lotus Pier before invading. Yu Ziyuan leads her sons into battle. However, the fight is too huge to handle and Madame Yu decides to put Wei Wuxian and Jiang Cheng on a boat to safety. She and Jiang Cheng share a tearful goodbye and Yu Ziyuan hands over Zidian to Jiang Cheng. Wei Wuxian is made to promise he will protect Jiang Cheng with his life and the two leave against their will, paralyzed by Zidian and taken away by the currents. They spot Jiang Fengmian on his way back to Yunmeng and Jiang Cheng fears for his safety. By the time they manage to return the place is in ruins. Over fifteen thousand disciplines and cultivators of the sect are dead. When they see their parents dead near Wen Chao, Jiang Cheng acts on impulse and catches the attention of Wen Zhuliu. Luckily, Wen Ning covers for them twice, letting them escape to a nearby forest. Jiang Cheng strikes Wei Wuxian as he blames him for saving Lan Wangji and upsetting the Wen in the first place, crying over his deceased parents.
| 12 | 12 | "Loyal Heart" | Xiong Ke | Liang Sha, Liu Xing & Zhu Ke | September 15, 2018 |
Back in the Cloud Recesses, Lan Wangji is reprimanded for sending disciples to search for Wei Wuxian and Jiang Cheng as it is too dangerous, but Lan Qiren defends his motives. Lan Wangji laments the two are yet to be found, even though Jiang Yanli was safe. Wei Wuxian and Jiang Cheng take cover in a village, but the former finds Jiang Cheng missing when he returned with food. He rushes back to the Lotus Pier to save a weakened Jiang Cheng and Wen Ning hides them in his room to prevent them from being caught. While Wen Ning's sister Wen Qing originally disapproved, she eventually agrees to heal the brothers and keeps them safely hidden for a few days before Wen Chao returns. When Jiang Cheng wakes up, he reveals his golden core has already been melted and his spiritual energy is gone. To make matters worse, his instability causes him to get defensive against Wen Ning as he is of the Wen sect. Wen Qing then makes him sleep and tells Wei Wuxian to wake him up when he has recovered. Wei WuXian is quickly healed but Wen Qing says the only reason he recovered so fast is that Madame Yu didn't put her full force into whipping him. Wei Wuxian looks at his spiritual energy as he decides to help Jiang Cheng get back his golden core.
| 13 | 13 | "Fatal Position" | Xiong Ke | Liang Sha, Liu Xing & Zhu Ke | September 22, 2018 |
Wei Wuxian brings Jiang Cheng to Yiling to meet Baoshan Sanren, ordering him to keep his blindfold on at all times and introduce himself as the son of Cangse Sanren. As Wei Wuxian waits on the foot of the mountain, he is ambushed by the Wen sect and stabbed through the chest by Wen Chao's sword. Wei Wuxian dares him to brutally kill him because after he dies he'll turn into a vicious ghost and torment the Wen to no end. The Wen throw him into the Burial Mounds where no one, dead or alive, ever returns, and leaves him to die. Following a tip the Jiang brothers were seen at Yiling, Lan Wangji arrive but finds only Wei Wuxian's fallen bell. When he returns to Gusu, he plays Inquiry but there is no information on him, dead or alive. Lan Xichen returns, having recruited many of the smaller clans to join together and fight the Wen sect and found Jiang Cheng. The Lan sect holds a meeting in the Cloud Recesses to convince the major sect leaders to join their alliance. Jiang Cheng shows up to express his urge for revenge. He and Lan Xichen convince the others into joining them to fight. Back in the Burial Mounds, Wei Wuxian survives the fall and gives in to the resentful energy so he has the power to get revenge.
| 14 | 14 | "Obscured Sun" | Xiong Ke | Liang Sha, Liu Xing & Zhu Ke | September 29, 2018 |
The Sunshot Campaign starts with the four clans marching into Qishan, but their attacks were in vain as Wen Ruohan overpowers them. Lan Wangji helps the Jiang sect by reinforcing their turf and Nie Mingjue beheads Wen Xu with his own hands. This victory boosts the morale of Nie Mingjue's followers and Wen Ruohan orders every branch of the Wen sect to join the fight. When the Lan and Jiang sects go to infiltrate the Wen sect one night, they discover that something else has already attacked the base, which has left most of its cultivators scared to death. Lan Wangji continues to find more places in the same situation. He affirms that the talismans have a reverse effect to summon evil and are drawn by the same person. On the other hand, Wang Lingjiao is panic-stricken as she suspects that Wei Wuxian has returned to haunt her and the clan. She eventually falls to the same fate as the talismans are altered. The Wen have also located the hideout of Jiang sect rebels and start an attack that overpowers them. Lan Wangji and Jiang Cheng are captured and Wen Chao reveals he killed Wei Wuxian in the Burial Mound months ago. However, a flute starts to play and a mysterious demonic cultivator arrives and reanimates the dead Wen...
| 15 | 15 | "Beautiful Tranquility" | Xiong Ke | Liang Sha, Liu Xing & Zhu Ke | October 6, 2018 |
The fierce corpses only attack the Wen sect. Lan Wangji calls the technique sinister but deems the demonic cultivator a friend. The deceased Wang Lingjiao starts to attack Wen Chao and Wen ZhuLiu, and the cultivator shows himself. The cultivator overpowers Wen Zhuliu and uses use resentful energy to tear out his golden core, which he smashes. He finally reveals himself to be Wei Wuxian, catching the three by surprise. Wei Wuxian continues using his dark abilities to kill Wen Chao and Wen Zhuliu. With both dead, Lan Wangji warns Wei Wuxian of the price of pursuing demonic cultivation and fears he will not be able to control it. Wei Wuxian has lost his past cheerful self and cannot detect Lan Wangji's act of kindness when the latter offers to take him back to Gusu so he won't have to keep using the techniques. Lan Wangji leaves the battlefield in anguish as Wei Wuxian stays with Jiang Cheng. The brothers successfully take back Lotus Pier. To break the deadlock with the Wen, Wei Wuxian retrieves the iron sword from the Tortoise of Carnage's cave and forges it into the Stygian Tiger Seal. Sixteen years later, Wei Wuxian wakes up in the Cloud Recesses. He discovers Lan Wangji has hidden a stash of his favorite wine in his room. Lan Sizhui and Lan Jingyi come to fetch Wei Wuxian to dine with them and recall the Siege of the Nightless City that ended the Sunshot Campaign and the Yiling Patriarch. They hear Wei Wuxian's donkey Little Apple attacking the rabbits in the back mountain and bumps into Lan Wangji. After Wei Wuxian laughs at Little Apple, he and Lan Wangji exchange a look of affinity.

=== Season 2 (2019) ===
| No. overall | No. in season | Title | Directed by | Written by | Original release date |
|---|---|---|---|---|---|
| 16 | 1 | "Join Hands" | Xiong Ke | Liang Sha, Liu Xing & Zhu Ke | August 3, 2019 |
Years ago, the four prestigious sects join hands to try and defeat Wen Ruohan. When Nie Mingjue goes up to attack Wen Ruohan one-to-one, he gets overpowered and Lan Xichen begins to help out. But even with the combined effort, Wen Ruohan's powers are impenetrable. Finally, Jin Guangyao ambushes him from behind, stabbing him to death and ending the Sunshot Campaign. In the present, Lan Xichen goes to the Carp Tower to visit Jin Guangyao. In the Cloud Recesses, Wei Wuxian tries to run away but Little Apple refuses. He remembers the need for the passage token to leave the Cloud Recesses's barrier and decides to sneak into the Cold Spring and steal one. He finds someone bathing in the spring and sees their back covered in scars from a discipline whip (which can never be removed). He uses a spell to take the token from the clothing but the bather, Lan Wangji, catches him red-handed. Wei WuXian sees a sun-shaped scar on his chest, surprising him, but just then Lan Sizhui rushes over to inform them the arm has gone out of control. It takes the combined abilities of Lan Wangji and Wei WuXian with their instruments to suppress it. Lan Sizhui suspects someone released the hand on Mo village due to the limited range of the spirit-summoning flags they used. If it had been so close before, Mo village would have been drenched in blood, so someone released it after they arrived. Wei WuXian concurs, and finds it suspicious Mo Xuanyu specifically summoned him in the sacrificial ritual just before the ghost hand and Wen Ning appeared. Later that night, disturbances of resentful energy are reported in areas near the Cloud Recesses. Wei Wuxian guesses these places are related to the arm and Lan Wangji dispatches disciples to investigate. The two follow the direction the arm is pointing and arrive at an abandoned town.
| 17 | 2 | "Love and Hate" | Xiong Ke | Liang Sha, Liu Xing & Zhu Ke | August 3, 2019 |
Lan Wangji and Wei Wuxian continues their search and arrives in a forest. At the same time, Jin Ling is also here to night-hunt but meets Sect Leader Yao. The latter starts attacking him and this catches the attention of Lan Wangji and Wei Wuxian. The two then rush to stop Sect Leader Yao. Wei Wuxian explains the large amount of resentful energy here is causing hallucinations and Jin Ling is unaffected because of the Yunmeng bell. Later, the three of them discover the guards of the observation tower killed by a mysterious beast. As the air grows ominous, a snake-like beast attacks them. With the efforts of the three, they successfully kill the monster. However, as Sect Leader Yao talks about Jiang Yanli and Wei Wuxian, Jin Ling runs away. He ends up in a place full of corpses and Lan Wangji and Wei Wuxian hurry over. A head attacks them and Wei Wuxian represses it. With Lan Wangji's guqin, they find out the head belongs to the deceased Jin Zixun, an uncle of Jin Ling. The memory of his death at Wei WuXian's hands after he tried to force him to remove a curse he supposedly placed on him unveils. The effects of the curse on Jin Zixun's body should remain even after death, unless the caster had died. His body disappeared after Wei Wuxian's death, so no one could confirm the marks had dissipated, which they would have if Wei WuXian cursed him - possibly to conceal the fact the marks remained even after the death of the Yiling Patriarch. Lan Wangji defends Wei Wuxian from Jin Ling, saying his deeds were honorable despite the cultivation he used, touching the resurrected Wei Wuxian next to him. The Ghost General Wen Ning appears and Jin Ling gives chase. Lan Wangji also notices someone spying on them but the person kills himself in a way that destroys his body so he cannot be questioned. Jin Ling releases a signal flare for help.
| 18 | 3 | "Web of Intrigue" | Xiong Ke | Liang Sha, Liu Xing & Zhu Ke | August 3, 2019 |
Jiang Cheng arrives and fights Wen Ning but the latter manages to escape. Jiang Cheng then confronts Lan Wangji and Wei Wuxian as he still doubts this "Mo Xuanyu". He ultimately leaves with Jin Ling. Before they leave, Wei WuXian destroys the zombie array at the mountain so it will stop collecting resentful energy and trapping people, something Lan Wangji, despite his cultivation level, is unable to do. Nothing further is found on the mountain so they leave to continue investigating. They meet the crazy woman again and find a pile of dead bodies with sword marks from Shuanghua. Lan Wangji explains the sword belongs to a talented cultivator named Xiao Xingchen. The arm goes out of control again and escapes from the Cloud Recesses. After this news reaches Lan Wangji and Wei Wuxian, they uses the Compass of Evil — linked with the head from earlier — to find the arm; and the two go to Qinghe. Jiang Cheng also sets off to the same place. In Qinghe, Wei Wuxian bumps into a merchant selling portraits of the Yiling Patriarch. While Wei Wuxian argues with him about how ugly he is drawn, Jin Ling comes and kicks the merchant, stating that he hates anyone who mentions Wei Wuxian's name. Wei Wuxian and Jin Ling quarrels a little and Jin Ling calls his dog Fairy over. Scared, Wei Wuxian runs back to Lan Wangji. Jin Ling walks away with Fairy and the two goes to Xinglu Ridge. On the way, Wei Wuxian hears the dog barking again and Lan Wangji asks why he is scared of dog, leading Wei Wuxian to remember the time he gets taken in by Jiang Fengmian.
| 19 | 4 | "Shishu" | Xiong Ke | Liang Sha, Liu Xing & Zhu Ke | August 10, 2019 |
Wei Wuxian and Lan Wangji follow the sounds of Fairy barking and are led to a tower. Seeing that a hole is blown on the wall, they enter to start finding Jin Ling. On the other hand, Jin Guangyao and Lan Xichen are trying to find Nie Huaisang. Upon entering the tower, Lan Wangji and Wei Wuxian find a coffin with a sword inside. Lan Wangji then plays Inquiry to ask for Jin Ling's whereabouts. With the replies from the spirit, they find Jin Ling unconscious inside the wall. The tower then starts to crumble and attack. They immediately bring Jin Ling outside. Fairy suddenly senses something and runs off. Lan Wangji tells Wei Wuxian that he will chase after it and will meet up again later. Wei Wuxian then looks at the cursed marks on Jin Ling's leg and wonders what hallucinations he is having from it. He then transfers the marks onto himself, making him hallucinate too. A young Jin Ling gets bullied by other children and Yiling Patriarch Wei Wuxian approaches him. He introduces himself as his uncle from the same discipline. When Jin Ling asks him about his parents Jin Zixuan and Jiang Yanli, Wei Wuxian recalls the times he spent with the two. He also painfully remembers their deaths but young Jin Ling wakes him from his nightmares. Jin Ling then asks where his parents are, so Wei Wuxian promises that they will look for them together. The hallucinations end and Wei Wuxian successfully removes the cursed marks. However, Jiang Cheng suddenly shows up.
| 20 | 5 | "Untamed" | Xiong Ke | Liang Sha, Liu Xing & Zhu Ke | August 17, 2019 |
Jin Ling wakes up in the inn and vaguely recalls last night's events. On the other hand, Jiang Cheng and Wei Wuxian argue about the latter's misdeeds. However, Wen Ning suddenly appears to protect Wei Wuxian and the three fight outside. Wei Wuxian chases Wen Ning away to prevent him from losing control and runs away too. He gets chased by Fairy and enters an abandoned residence to hide from it. Jin Ling shows up and the two talk for a bit. When he says that Jiang Cheng hates Wei Wuxian to the bones, Wei Wuxian reminiscences about his childhood with Jiang Cheng and Jiang Yanli. He also apologises to Jin Ling about his actions on Mt. Dafan before Jin Ling leaves. Wen Ning returns to meet Wei Wuxian and the latter starts to remember the time when he protected the Wen sect remnants from everyone else and how he was constantly forced to hand over the Stygian Tiger Seal. Wei WuXian also looks into Wen Ning's memories and discovers that the Jin Sect and Lan Sect had worked together during the past years.
| 21 | 6 | "Right and Wrong" | Xiong Ke | Liang Sha, Liu Xing & Zhu Ke | August 24, 2019 |
Jin Guangyao and Lan Xichen discuss about the connection between the mysterious hand and Ghost General. Back in the abandoned residence, Wei Wuxian regains Wen Ning's consciousness and asks about what happened. However, Wen Ning cannot remember much about his days of being locked up, except the presence of Jin Guangshan and two other people, one of which wears GusuLan sect robes. Wei Wuxian then faints from the effects of the cursed marks and remembers his time in Yiling 15 years ago. Wei Wuxian finds Wen Yuan with Lan Wangji and decides to enjoy a meal with the latter. Although Lan Wangji tries to warn him of the consequences of demonic cultivation, Wei Wuxian reassures that he will not be harmed. Suddenly, trouble arises in the Burial Mound and they rush back to find Wen Ning going berserk. They work together to suppress Wen Ning and successfully regain his consciousness. Wei Wuxian then sends Lan Wangji off and the two share another conversation about Wei Wuxian's decisions. The latter is unwilling to give up on the Wen Remnants but is determined not to lose control, and hence the two part ways. One year later, Jin Zixun ambushes Wei Wuxian and Wen Ning on Qiongqi Way while they are on their way to Jin Ling's one-month anniversary. Jin Zixun believes that Wei Wuxian has cursed him with the Hundred Holes and attacks him when he does not admit. Subsequently, the overwhelming amount of resentful energy takes control of Wei Wuxian. When Jin Zixuan arrives to stop him, the Stygian Tiger Seal causes Wen Ning to kill Jin Zixuan. In the post-credits, Wei WuXian remembers when Jiang Cheng brought their sister Yangli to visit him at Yiling so he could see her in her wedding clothes before she got married. She even let him pick Jin Ling's birth name, Rulan.
| 22 | 7 | "Night Rush" | Xiong Ke | Liang Sha, Liu Xing & Zhu Ke | August 31, 2019 |
Wei Wuxian faints after the incident at Qiongqi Way and wakes up in his cave in the Burial Mound. When he sees Wen Ning, he beats him in rage and cries about not knowing what to do. Wen Qing uses a needle to render him weak and explains she and Wen Ning will confess their crimes. Even though Wei Wuxian refuses, he is unable to stop them and wakes three days later. He goes to the Nightless City where the other sects are holding a ceremony to pay their respects to those killed by the Wen (including Wen Ning), and to vow to kill Wei Wuxian and the Wen remnant. Wei Wuxian wants to find out the truth behind the Hundred Holes but after someone makes Wen Ning go berserk and summons resentful energy to corrupt Wei Wuxian, a fight ensues. Lan Wangji tries to reason with Wei Wuxian but he is too far gone to listen. Suddenly, Jiang Yanli arrives on the battlefield to find him but is injured by a fierce corpse. Wei Wuxian frantically orders the fierce corpses to stay away from her, but it fails as he has totally lost control. While Wei Wuxian holds her dearly in his arms, Jiang Yanli tells him to stop and he regains control of himself and the fierce corpses. Jiang Yanli pushes him away from an incoming attack and is stabbed in his place. Shocked and distraught, Wei Wuxian goes berserk and unleashes the power of the Stygian Tiger Seal on everyone present, resulting in massive slaughter. Wei Wuxian wakes from the flashbacks to find himself under Lan Wangji's care. The cursed marks are suppressed and Lan Wangji returns his Yunmeng bell he lost after he was attacked by Wen Chao and the temporary flute, revealing he knows he is Wei Wuxian, having known since they met on Mt. Dafan. Wei Wuxian enjoys a meal with him to regain his strength, trying and failing to coax Lan Wangji to admit how he recognized him. At the table, they discuss Wei Wuxian's dream and Lan Wangji reveals he suspects someone else manipulated resentful energy to corrupt the Stygian Tiger Seal, and thus Wei Wuxian - the true mastermind behind the deaths in the past. Suddenly, the window opens.
| 23 | 8 | "The Truth" | Xiong Ke | Liang Sha, Liu Xing & Zhu Ke | August 31, 2019 |
Nie Huaisang enters the room, stating that he was merely nearby, which Wei Wuxian finds suspicious, as he and Lan Wangji found his folding fan near the castle. Wei Wuxian begins to interrogate him about the castle. On the way there, Nie Huaisang explains that the human-eating castle is in fact his sect's burial grounds. Its reputation for "eating people" is a fabricated rumor to discourage people to enter, and ruckuses are caused by the swords left behind by the deceased Nie Sect ancestors. When they arrive, they find corpses and a group of black-clad people preparing to attack them. Wei Wuxian engages them while Lan Wangji goes to check the tower. When Nie Huaisang is suddenly targeted, Lan Xichen and Jin Guangyao arrive to aid them. During the fight, Lan Wangji and Wei Wuxian discover one of the black-clad cultivators is skilled in Gusu's sword techniques and has scars from casting the Hundred Holes curse. The zombie hand also appears and Wei Wuxian questions the link with it. After, they find a pair of legs that matches with the zombie arm sewn onto one of the corpses. They then part ways and Wei Wuxian and Lan Wangji continue their search for the other parts. The zombie hand points them to a new direction and the two set off West. In town, Lan Wangji tries to ask how Wei Wuxian has died, but the latter refuses to tell. He then finds a pellet drum for sale and remembers how he used to love this toy. A memory of young Lan Wangji giving a pellet drum to young Wei Wuxian resurfaces, back when they were both children, before an orphaned Wei Wuxian was taken to the Lotus Pier. In the post-credit scene, Jin Guangyao looks at a paper with directions for the Sacrifice Ritual Mo Xuanyu used on it and murmurs Wei Wuxian's name. Lan Wangji and Wei Wuxian arrives in Yi City, but find only corpses killed by Shuanghua before meeting Xiao Xingchen.

=== Season 3 (2021) ===
| No. overall | No. in season | Title | Directed by | Written by | Original release date |
|---|---|---|---|---|---|
| 24 | 1 | "Yi City" | Xiong Ke | Liang Sha, Liu Xing & Zhu Ke | August 7, 2021 |
As Wei Wuxian and Lan Wangji journey towards Yi City, Wei Wuxian once again attempts to figure out how Lan Wangji recognised him but fails, although Lan Wangji looks amused. Instead, the pair find sword marks carved against the mountains along with a trail of blood. Two hours earlier, Lan Wangji and Wei Wuxian discover that the ghost arm no longer points them in the direction of its body. Lan Wangji receives a message from his brother explaining the stone castle issue has been solved but Lan Xichen is still worried that a calamity is approaching the cultivation world. In order to gather clues about the dismembered corpse, Lan Wangji wants to find nearby cultivation clans but Wei Wuxian gets faster and more reliable information from the locals due to his carefree nature. The locals inform them that some junior cultivators passed through earlier, headed towards Yi City, famous for their funeral accessories. Once inside the city, Wei Wuxian continues to tease Lan Wangji to little effect. They suddenly encounter Jin Ling as he was separated from the other juniors. He explains that he, Lan Sizhui, and Lan Jingyi are investigating a case about cat corpses nailed to door frames of the inns they stay at. The string of corpses lead them towards Yi City from Liyang. Apparently, ten years ago the Yueyang Chang Clan located in Liyang was massacred overnight, only Clan Leader Chang Ping survived. The residence was later turned into a cemetery but when the juniors investigated the location, all the corpses had been dug up years ago. It is said to have been the Yiling Patriarch's doing but Lan Wangji explains the culprit was Xue Yang, who had a grudge against the clan. When he was caught by Xiao Xingchen, Chang Ping suddenly recanted his testimony and Xue Yang was released. Xue Yang later caused Xiao Xingchen's closest friend to become blind but Chang Ping's corpse had both eyes cut out and was killed with Shuanghua, Xiao Xingchen's sword. The murderer hasn't been confirmed. Prior to Chang Ping's death, Jin Guangyao sentenced Xue Yang to death. Jin Ling discovers a paper mannequin and several corpses, each a civilian, who's been dead for several years yet not decayed, and killed with Shuanghua a Frost mark. The group is ambushed by walking corpses. When discovering spiritual cultivation does no damage, Wei Wuxian attempts to use demonic cultivation but the corpses do not obey. Leaving a fallen Jin Ling to Lan Wangji, Wei Wuxian dispatches the corpses. Discovering one corpse belongs to the Chang Clan and is missing his eyes, Lan Wangji plays Inquiry. The memory that unravels reveals Xiao Xingchen and Song Lan bring Xue Yang to Jin Guangshan for punishment. There are accusations that Jin Guangyao is protecting him because he can repair the Stygian Tiger Seal, which wasn't completely destroyed during the siege. Outraged, Nie Mingjue attempts to kill Xue Yang but is stopped by Meng Yao. Before being taken away, Xue Yang taunts Xiao Xingchen that they'll meet again. Lan Wangji later explains how Yue Yang poisoned Song Lan into losing his eyesight but Xiao Xingchen returned to his master Baoshan Sanren and gave his own eyes to Song Lan out of guilt. Afterwards, their location became unknown. Wei Wuxian suspects that someone is using the Stygian Tiger Seal inside Yi City since he cannot control the corpses. As a red cloud of resentful energy appears, Lan Wangji is separated from Wei Wuxian. The latter meets Xiao Xingchen as he's killing the walking corpses that explode green powder. Wei Wuxian uses a demonic array to disperse the energy.
| 25 | 2 | "Shuanghua" | Xiong Ke | Liang Sha, Liu Xing & Zhu Ke | August 7, 2021 |
Wei Wuxian engages in conversation with Xiao Xingchen while they flee from the walking corpses. Jin Ling wakes up during the escape, causing the trio to fall off the building and take shelter in an abandoned courtyard. Xiao Xingchen warns Wei Wuxian and Jin Ling about the corpses while under the effects of corpse poisoning. Meanwhile, Lan Wangji eradicates more corpses, following a ghost girl with a bamboo pole who leads him to unconscious Lan Clan juniors. While corpses are trying to enter the courtyard, Wei Wuxian creates a demonic barrier but it's breached by a vicious corpse. While Xiao Xingchen is being watched by Jin Ling, Wei Wuxian deduces that the new corpse is being controlled by someone. Using twin paper mannequins, Wei Wuxian incapacitates the corpse, revealed to be Song Zichen. He finds puncture holes from skull piercing needles in its neck, a severed tongue, and the mark of Xiao Xingchen's weapon. Wei Wuxian begins to realize that “Xiao Xingchen” is not who he seems. “Xiao Xingchen” uses demonic cultivation to attack Wei Wuxian. Song Zichen also moves to attack but Wen Ning intervenes and moves the fight outside. Xiao Xingchen is revealed to be Xue Yang, who puts Jin Ling to sleep using corpse poison before addressing Wei Wuxian as the Yiling Patriarch, explaining that he wants his help in restoring one's spirit. Wei Wuxian refuses. With Lan Wangji's arrival, Xue Yang escapes with Song Zichen. The other juniors arrive. Afterward, Wei Wuxian, Lan Wangji, and the junior disciples rest in a coffin house to feed porridge to Jin Ling and cure his corpse poisoning. There's banging on the sealed door and Wei Wuxian makes it a training exercise, scaring all the juniors while educating them on identifying ghosts. The banging comes from a blind ghost girl who seems to be trying to help them. Following her, she leads them to another coffin house and urges them to open a coffin, revealing a dead Xiao Xingchen. Eleven years ago, the ghost girl A-Qing ran into Xiao Xingchen while pretending to be blind in order to steal from him. A few moments later, the two discover an injured Xue Yang.
| 26 | 3 | "The Dream" | Xiong Ke | Liang Sha, Liu Xing & Zhu Ke | August 14, 2021 |
Wei Wuxian and Lan Wangji use Empathy on A-Qing in order to find out what unfolded between her, Xue Yang, Xiao Xingchen, and Song Lan. Empathy is an incredibly dangerous technique that allows the caster to witness the memories of a ghost through first-person. Once witnessing the past, they discover that Xiao Xingchen saved Xuan Yang shortly after Jin Guangyao sentenced him to death by finding him near the road. However, due to Xiao Xingchen being blind and Xue Yang changing his voice, he cannot tell that Xue Yang is his greatest enemy. The daec piece together that A-Qing is not blind, just a good actor. Seeing that Xue Yang attempted to kill her, A-Qing falls over the threshold of the cemetery house, gaining his faith that she is blind. Even with Xue Yang healed, he refuses to leave them, and even joins Xiao Xingchen on night-hunts. On their night hunt, Xue Yang has cut out the tongues of nearby villagers. Since they now sound like walking corpses, Xiao Xingchen does not hesitate to kill them since he cannot see. A-Qing followed them on their night-hunt, but after discovering fake livor mortis, decides Xue Yang is helpful. One night, Xue Yang told a story of a little boy who got humiliated and abused when running an errand for a man in exchange for candy (which he didn't even get). He didn't make it clear that it's about himself but A-Qing and Xiao Xingchen figured it out anyway and sympathized with the situation he was in. The next day, Xiao Xingchen brings candies for the kids and a hairpin for A-Qing. Two years later, Xue Yang is attacked by Song Zichen but has his tongue removed which also gives him livor mortis spots. Xiao Xingchen, who arrives moments later, kills his sworn brother thinking he was a walking corpse without realizing it's Song Zichen who came to warn him about Xue Yang. A-Qing was witness to this but Xue Yang discovers her. When they're arguing, Xiao Xingchen hears his real voice and stabs him. While fighting, Xue Yang finishes his story about the boy who loved candy. When the boy chased after the man's chart, his finger was run over and removed. The man was of the Chang sect, which warranted their deaths. Xue Yang reveals what the pair had been hunting for the past two years. Upon discovering that he killed Song Zichen, Xiao Xingchen cries tears of blood while Xue Yang degrades him. His words make Wei Wuxian remember his own life. Xiao Xingchen kills himself with his sword. Sensing Wei Wuxian's distress, Lan Wangji offers him an umbrella. At the sound of the clarity bell, the alpha-beta pair awakens from Empathy in time to fight against Xue Yang. With Lan Wangji fighting Xue Yang in the forest, a mass of walking corpses advance on their shelter. Using his own blood, Wei Wuxian summons all the corpses and paper mannequins from Yi City to aid in the disposal of the corpses. Once finished, Wei Wuxian joins Lan Wangji and Wen Ning, releasing Song Lan from his servitude and pursuing Xue Yang, obtaining Xiao Xingchen's shattered soul and sword. Xue Yang disappears in resentful mist but A-Qing taps the ground with her bamboo pole to alert his location. Xue Yang reveals that he wants to turn Xiao Xingchen into a resentful corpse so he can never be at peace. Wei Wuxian deduces that Xue Yang killed the Chang sect in revenge for Xiao Xingchen, not himself. That night, Xue Yang had tried to keep Xiao Xingchen from bleeding out but failed. With A-Qing help, Lan Wangji fatally injures Xue Yang as he holds onto the last piece of candy Xiao Xingchen gave him. One of the sacrificial warriors teleports away with Xue Yang's corpse. After, Wei Wuxian gives Song Lan Frost and a spirit pouch containing both A-Qing and Xiao Xingchen before they part ways. The entire city is burned to the ground, along with all the corpses, so that all the souls may rest in peace.
| 27 | 4 | "Getting Drunk" | Xiong Ke | Liang Sha, Liu Xing & Zhu Ke | August 21, 2021 |
After Xue Yang is taken away, Lan Wangji suspects the Stygian Tiger Seal was on his person. Additionally, they find the second arm of the corpse. Returning to the city, the junior disciples burn money and release lanterns on the water as tribute to the deceased of Yi City. When Wei Wuxian attempts to stop the boys, they reply that since he was never dead, he wouldn't know and that if he didn't get any it was because no one gave him any. Wei Wuxian feels betrayed when Lan Wangji doesn't admit to sending any either. With most of the pieces of the demonic hand gathered, Wei Wuxian guesses that it was Xue Yang who dismembered, experimented on, and hid all the pieces. Lan Sizhui explains that all the cat corpse locations were in a line pointing towards Yi City, except for one located in Yunping City. Once there, the group finds Fairy and Lil' Apple fighting. Wei Wuxian insists that the donkey was a gift from Lan Wangji, which leads to the juniors arguing before being silenced with a spell. The cat corpse was discovered at Guanyin Temple but once they arrive, Wei Wuxian sees the location instead as a former brothel where women danced. After deciding to stay in the city, Lan Wangji and Wei Wuxian run into a group of children reenacting the Sunshot Campaign and arguing over which historical figure should be leader. The kids certainly have their personalities down. When “Jiang Cheng” reminds “Yiling Patriarch” how he died, the air changes. The “Yiling Patriarch” is pushed and left by the other kids, the “Stygian Tiger Seal” breaking in half. Lan Wangji assisted the child and was given some beans as thanks. Humor restored, Wei Wuxian and Lan Wangji return to the inn where the latter agrees to drink with him. While eating, the innkeeper tells tales of the Guanyin Temple's past being a brothel. He also explains that the locals pray to the temple for help with ghosts instead of going to the Yunmeng Jiang Clan that resides over the area. The innkeeper explains the reason behind this is due to Jiang Cheng's terrifying habit of kidnapping and torturing demonic cultivators, insisting that each is Wei Wuxian's reincarnation. After winning a bet where Wei Wuxian drinks an entire jar of wine without getting drunk, Wei Wuxian claims his surname is Lan and the innkeeper must adopt that name. Surprised, Lan Wangji accidentally eats a chili pepper. Wei Wuxian accidentally gets Lan Wangji drunk after one drink, but is surprised when that means he falls asleep. After putting him to bed, removing and folding the forehead ribbon in the process, Wei Wuxian goes to investigate the temple. He encounters Wen Ning who is watching the juniors argue over demonic cultivators and their need to be exterminated. Meanwhile, Lan Wangji wakes up from a bad memory of Wei Wuxian's death and finds Wei Wuxian with Wen Ning. Lan Wangji childishly pushes Wen Ning away. With Wei Wuxian realizing that Lan Wangji is still drunk, he sends Wen Ning away, and tries to herd Lan Wangji back to their room. Lan Wangji offers Wei Wuxian several gifts including his flute, a rattle drum, and a dried flower. When he doesn't respond positively, he wonders if Wei Wuxian would prefer joss paper (money for the deceased) before stating that Wei Wuxian shouldn't need it since he isn't dead. A chase over the rooftops begins where the pair dance between past and present. Wei Wuxian promises to return to Gusu with Lan Wangji after solving the demonic hand mystery. After attempting to communicate with the spirits of the dead, Lan Wangji discovers a massive array arranged over the temple. Suddenly, the masked cultivators attack them but Lan Wangji deflects them and escapes with Wei Wuxian. The cultivators disappear with the talismans the Wei Wuxian drew. They're wearing Nie Clan robes. Wei Wuxian explains the talismans were a trap and the spirit compass is tracking their whereabouts.
| 28 | 5 | "An Old Acquaintance" | Xiong Ke | Liang Sha, Liu Xing & Zhu Ke | August 28, 2021 |
Lan Xichen comes just in time to help Lan Wangji and Wei Wuxian subdue the Body. Together, they go to Jinlintai Tower for the annual Discussion Conference.
| 29 | 6 | "The Venerated Triad" | Xiong Ke | Liang Sha, Liu Xing & Zhu Ke | September 4, 2021 |
Wei Wuxian and Lan Wangji delve into the past to find the relationship between Nie Mingjue and Jin Guangyao.
| 30 | 7 | "Deviated Spirit" | Xiong Ke | Liang Sha, Liu Xing & Zhu Ke | September 11, 2021 |
The past is seen and an identity is unmasked.
| 31 | 8 | "Fated" | Xiong Ke | Liang Sha, Liu Xing & Zhu Ke | September 18, 2021 |
Clarity becomes turmoil. Wei Ying finds out more about Lan Zhan's past.
| 32 | 9 | "Manifest" | Xiong Ke | Liang Sha, Liu Xing & Zhu Ke | September 25, 2021 |
The children are kidnapped and held at the Burial Mounds. Wei Wuxian is accused and Lan Zhan helps clear his name. Another culprit is revealed.
| 33 | 10 | "Hatred" | Xiong Ke | Liang Sha, Liu Xing & Zhu Ke | October 2, 2021 |
Remnants of the past save the present. Blood boils and tides turn.
| 34 | 11 | "Hidden Blade" | Xiong Ke | Liang Sha, Liu Xing & Zhu Ke | October 9, 2021 |
The mastermind shows themself as things are coming to an end.
| 35 | 12 | "Return to Seclusion" | Xiong Ke | Liang Sha, Liu Xing & Zhu Ke | October 16, 2021 |
An episode of new beginnings and where loose ends are tied.
