= List of Transformers: Cybertron episodes =

The following is a list of episodes in the Transformers series, Transformers: Cybertron. There are 52 episodes which were broadcast between September 19, 2005, and October 2, 2006, on the Cartoon Network. It chronicles the adventures of the Autobots, as they battle the Decepticons and attempt to claim the four Cyber Planet Keys.

The series uses four pieces of theme music. For the first twenty-seven episodes of the series, "CALL YOU... The Future of You and I (CALL YOU... 君と僕の未来)" by Shinji Kakijima is used for the opening theme and "Always (いつも)" by Tomoka Issei is used for the ending theme. The remaining episodes use "IGNITION!" by CHINO for the opening theme and "GROWING UP!!" by Shinji Kakijima for the ending theme. In the English dub of the series, all of the original ending themes are removed, with the song "Transformers: Cybertron Theme" by Paul Oakenfold used for both the opening and ending in all episodes.

== Episodes ==
No.	Title	Directed by	Written by	Original release date
1	"The Fall of the Holy Land, Seibertron?!" ("Fallen"); Transliteration: "Seinaru Furusato Seibātoron-boshi Hōkai!?" (Japanese: 聖なる故郷 セイバートロン星崩壊！？)	Manabu Ono	Hiro Masaki	January 8, 2005
The episode begins with the Autobots evacuating Seibertron (Cybertron) due to the black hole threatening their planet. The Autobots are transporting a few last minute supplies when Starscream shows up. Starscream attacks the Autobots, but Galaxy Convoy (Optimus Prime) drives out to the rescue. He quickly transforms and attacks, but then he realizes Starscream is a decoy and rolls for the base. Starscream targets Optimus, but Landmine jumps in the way. He is damaged and begins to float away, so to save him, Vector Prime comes out and opens a space bridge to Earth that Landmine drifts through. On Earth, Coby and his younger brother Bud are racing dirt bikes with their dad. Lori comes out and begins to complain, so they invite her to join the festivities. The three kids begin hiking in the mountains when they see the space bridge open. They go to investigate the crash and discover Landmine. Coby repairs Landmine, so Landmine begins to tell them the tale of the Transformers. He reveals that the black hole was created by the destruction of Unicron. The black hole was now consuming many planets, and Cybertron was next so Optimus had sent Jetfire to Earth to scan some vehicles. Jetfire brought back vehicle designs for all the Transformers, so they scanned them and began transporting to Earth when a space bridge opens up. Out comes Vector Prime, who calls himself the Keeper of Space and Time. Vector Prime says the only way to save Cybertron and the universe was to decipher his map and find the Cyber Planet Keys. Optimus quickly agrees. Back on Earth, Thundercracker scans a jet and locates Landmine. He decides to attack Landmine from behind. Landmine protects the kids, and then Optimus arrives in his flying Mack truck mode. Optimus quickly disposes of Thundercracker and informs the other Autobots that he has located Landmine. The Autobots drive over and introduce themselves to the kids, and then Optimus decides to tell them the rest of the story. After saving Landmine, Vector Prime was able to finish synchronizing the map. Just then Megatron transported in and disposed of Scattershot. He tried to convince Vector Prime that the Autobots were evil, but Vector Prime wasn't fooled so Megatron stole the planet map instead. Optimus came in and went into Super Mode. He went head to head with Megatron, but Megatron was able to transport out after stealing the map, so the Decepticons have the map and the Autobots are on Earth. Vector prime then summons the Mini-Cons. The Minicons scan vehicles and begin to do their daily tasks when Vector Prime notices Lori's shirt. Lori's shirt contains a symbol that is the Seal of Atlantis. Vector Prime realizes that the Omega Lock is on Earth, and he informs the Autobots that if they find the Omega Lock, they can also find another map, so the mission begins. NOTE:This Episode, Along with the rest of the series, is the first episode where Scott McNeil, Brent Miller and Ward Perry do not Voice Jetfire, Hot Shot and Landmine, as the three are now Voiced by Brian Drummond, Kirby Morrow and Paul Dobson.
2	"Encounter with the Transformers" ("Inferno"); Transliteration: "Toransufōmā to no Sōgū" (Japanese: トランスフォーマーとの遭遇)	Kahoru Igusa	Hiro Masaki	January 15, 2005
New information is revealed about Landmine's arrival on Earth, as well as Scattershot's pre-CDT scan. NOTE: This episode is the fully dubbed version of episode two of Transformers Galaxy Force (Encounter with the Transformers).
3	"Protect the Secret Base!" ("Haven"); Transliteration: "Himitsu Kichi o Mamore!" (Japanese: 秘密基地を守れ！)	Makoto Nagao	Akatsuki Yamatoya	January 22, 2005
The episode begins with Coby, Lori, and Bud having chosen a mountainside for the Autobots' base. Lori reveals that her dad owns the land and was going to use it for house construction, but the market went soft, so the Autobots build their base there. Bud is amazed that the secret base is a secret, but he suggests they build a takeoff tower for Jetfire and Vector Prime. Meanwhile Coby helps build the main computer system, and Lori customizes the base with items for the kids. Out in space, Megatron decides he wants to return to Earth and find out what the Autobots are doing. Starscream says it's a waste of time, but Megatron insists Starscream join him. Back on Earth the Autobots activate their system just in time to detect Megatron and Starscream approaching the earth. Optimus, Hotshot, Vector Prime, and Jetfire head out to intercept the two Decepticons while Overhaul, Landmine, and the kids apply stealth coating to conceal the base. As the Autobots engage the Decepticons in battle, Starscream hits Jetfire, so Vector Prime decides to take on Megatron one on one. He fights him hoping to recover the map, but Megatron refuses. Hotshot transforms and shoots up at Starscream, but Starscream realizes they are being misled, informs Megatron, and the two Decepticons fly past. At the base, Scattershot checks the stealth coating progress and informs everyone that the Decepticons have broken through. Sector D is the only sector left uncoated, so Overhaul rushes over to finish it, but Scattershot fears it'll be too late. Outside Megatron is approaching the base when Vector Prime transports in front of him, cutting him off. Megatron transforms and begins to fight, so Vector Prime activates his Cyber Key and uses his tachyon shield. Vector Prime pushes Megatron back, and while Starscream is distracted, Hot Shot transforms and shoots him down. Seeing Megatron stunned, Optimus transforms and goes into Super Mode. He shoots Megatron, damaging the Decpticon leader, so Megatron calls for a swift retreat. At the base, Overhaul finishes the stealth coating just as the Decepticons retreat and everyone celebrates. Outside, Optimus, Hot Shot, and Jetfire ask Vector Prime what the light was that he used during the fight. Vector Prime informs them that Cyber Keys are a little power from Primus that they can activate, and then he activates their Cyber Key locks so they can access Cyber Key power in the future.
4	"We'll Teach You How to Live on Earth" ("Hidden"); Transliteration: "Chikyū de no Kurashi-kata Oshiemasu" (Japanese: 地球での暮らし方教えます)	Junichi Watanabe	Manabu Ishikawa	January 29, 2005
Bud, Lori, and Coby attempt to teach some Autobots how to live on Earth, but their imaginations go wild and they make several mistakes. Bud and two Autobot submarines are spotted by the Navy, Coby draws the attention of a police officer, Lori puts a traffic light in the middle of the desert and scares someone. Meanwhile, Red Alert makes an unsuccessful attempt at containing the black hole with a gravitron grid. The Autobots intercept a news broadcast and discover Thundercracker attacking some Earth planes. Jetfire arrives and engages Thundercracker. Vector Prime warps the Earth jets to safety as the other Decepticons arrive. During the battle, Jetfire and Optimus activate their Cyber Key powers for the first time, only to find out that Megatron has discovered the location of the first Cyber Planet Key. Later, the pilot who was involved in the battle reports the strange happenings to his commander, who seems to have a hint as to what they may be. Meanwhile, every Autobot is gathered at the base and the children teach them how to obey Earth's traffic laws. Jolt helps by adding holograms to vehicle driver's seats. NOTE: This episode marks the first cameo appearance of Blurr (blue race car with red stripes), one of the retooled Armada figures released in this series.
5	"Find the Chip Square!" ("Landmine"); Transliteration: "Chippa Sukuea o Sagase!" (Japanese: チップスクエアを探せ！)	Kunitoshi Okajima	Genki Yoshimura	February 5, 2005
Arriving on the planet Speedia (Speed Planet / Velocitron), Megatron forces two local troublemakers, Ransack and Crumplezone, to become his new subordinates. Back on Earth, the still injured Landmine feels he is ready to return to action and finally scans his new vehicle mode. Meanwhile, Bud and Jolt discover a possible clue to the Omega Lock in a temple in Mexico. The Autobots investigate and are attacked by Starscream and Thundercracker. They activate their Cyber Key powers and the battle ensues. Landmine arrives and engages Starscream, against the orders of Optimus Prime. He activates his Cyber Key power, rescues the humans from an incoming missile and is re-injured. After the battle, Vector Prime discovers what only an imitation of the Omega Lock is. However, the ruins give hints that allow Vector Prime to determine the location of the Speed Planet. Hot Shot and Red Alert are sent there to search for the Speed Planet Key. Override makes her first appearance at the end of this episode.
6	"The Amazing Planet of Speedia" ("Space"); Transliteration: "Kyōi no Wakusei Supīdia" (Japanese: 驚異の惑星スピーディア)	Nobuharu Kamanaka	Hiro Masaki	February 12, 2005
Bud, jealous of Hot Shot, wants to go to space. He and Jolt convince Scattershot to take a ride on the space bridge. As he is searching for clues about Velocitron's Planet Key, Megatron engages in a race against the planet's "leader", Override, and loses by a small margin. Override explains that she does not know about the key and just wanted to race. Meanwhile, Bud and Scattershot are observing a battle from space and are hit by a stray missile, which knocks them into a freefall. On Speed Planet, Megatron orders Ransack and Crumplezone to find new information about the Planet Key. Back on Earth, the Autobots finally find out the whereabouts of Bud and Scattershot. Jetfire rushes to their rescue but a wayward satellite hits them and knocks them towards the atmosphere. Quick thinking by Jolt saves them both. It turns out Vector Prime had been teaching the Mini-Cons to create small dimension gates, and that got them back to base. Back on Speed Planet, Red Alert learns that the Cyber Keys on Speed Planet were all coloured red, different from the blue Cyber Keys of Earth. Hot Shot observes Ransack and Crumplezone beating up on two locals. He disobeys Optimus's orders and rescues Clocker and Brakedown, much to the dismay of Red Alert. NOTE: First cameo appearance of Dirt Boss (green and purple Monster Truck).
7	"Nitro Convoy, the Fastest Hero" ("Rush"); Transliteration: "Saisoku no Yūsha Nitoro Konboi" (Japanese: 最速の勇者ニトロコンボイ)	Mitsuru Kawasaki	Kazuhisa Sakaguchi	February 19, 2005
This episode picks up where the last one left off, with Hot Shot coming to the aid of Clocker and Brakedown. As Hot Shot is battling Ransack and Crumplezone, Red Alert reluctantly joins the fight and tends to the injured Brakedown. After the fight, Hot Shot and Red Alert start arguing over what just occurred when an eavesdropping Clocker hears them mention they were from Cybertron. They then ask the two locals about the Planet Key. Clocker and Brakedown don't know anything about it, but agree to help look. Meanwhile on Earth, the Autobots lure the Decepticons into attacking a decoy base in hopes they'll think they've destroyed the real one. Back on Speed Planet, Clocker guides the others through the streets and tells them that Override may know where the key is. However, Megatron and Override are already discussing the key. Override mentions the Planet Cup, which may a clue. Override, Megatron and Hot Shot race to see who gets to keep the cup. Override wins again due to interference from Ransack and Crumplezone. After the race Hot Shot and Red Alert get into another argument over their objectives on Speed Planet. Angered, Hot Shot drives off to find Override.
8	"Fierce Fighting! Starscream" ("Speed"); Transliteration: "Gekitō! Sutāsukurīmu" (Japanese: 激闘！スタースクリーム)	Atsushi Takeyama	Hiro Masaki	February 26, 2005
As Starscream is fighting a combat simulation, he is contacted by Megatron who reminds him what will happen if he doesn't find the Omega Lock. Starscream starts to reveal his true intentions during a battle between the Autobots and Thundercracker. Meanwhile on Speed Planet, Override once more engages in a race, this time with Hot Shot – leading to Hot Shot finally igniting his Cyber Key in a losing effect. A rift over actions conflicting with orders begins to build between Hot Shot and Red Alert. Later, Starscream arrives on Velocitron demanding to take the new recruits to see if they are worthy in battle. The Speed Planet Decepticons and Starscream ambush Red Alert in a junkyard. Red Alert blasts Ransack and Crumplezone into the stars but Starscream escapes. Starscream thinks he will soon rule the universe and reveals something that looks exactly like the map Megatron stole from Vector Prime.
9	"Save the City of the People!" ("Collapse"); Transliteration: "Ningen no Machi o Sukue!" (Japanese: 人間の街を救え！)	Makoto Nagao	Kazuhiko Sōma	March 5, 2005
On Velocitron, Megatron tries to search for the Planet Cup but its defenses are too strong. While the United States Secret Service spies on Coby, Bud, and Lori in an attempt to find out more about the Transformers, their hometown is threatened by an earthquake and flood caused by a mining accident. Coby thinks of a plan inspired by Green Gloop to save the town. Back on the Speed Planet, Ransack and Crumplezone tell Megatron they are entered in the Great Race. Hot Shot was eavesdropping and then feels it's up to him to save the Universe.
10	"Vector Prime's Decision" ("Time"); Transliteration: "Bekutā Puraimu no Ketsudan" (Japanese: ベクタープライムの決断)	Tsuyoshi Masui	Hiro Masaki	March 12, 2005
Vector Prime tells the kids about Cybertron, the Planet Keys, the Omega Lock, and how the Transformers' ancestors tried to create a network of space bridges to span the entire universe. Meanwhile, Megatron finds the location of the second planet. On Velocitron, Hot Shot is still trying to control his handling. Investigating Earth's ruins in the hope of finding out more about Atlantis and the Omega Lock, the Autobots head out to the Sahara Desert. There, Megatron destroys Vector Prime's Mini-Con friends, causing him to reveal his time turning abilities to save them. Megatron and Starscream take the Omega Lock but a missed shot from Thundercracker shatters it. Megatron explains that it must have been a replica, since the true Omega Lock cannot be destroyed so easily. So Megatron and Starscream head off to the second planet.
11	"Beast Planet Animatros" ("Search"); Transliteration: "Majū Wakusei Animatorosu" (Japanese: 魔獣惑星アニマトロス)	Kunitoshi Okajima	Hiro Masaki	March 19, 2005
On Earth, Optimus enlists the help of Autobot civilians to find clues about Atlantis. On Velocitron, Ransack and Crumplezone harass a local named Dirt Boss into joining their efforts to defeat Hot Shot and Override. Meanwhile, Megatron and Starscream arrive on the Jungle Planet, where they are confronted by the planet's leader, Scourge, and his minions, Snarl (Fangwolf) and Undermine. Back on Earth, the Autobot civilians begin their work to find the Seal of Atlantis. Thundercraker decides to have some fun at the expense of a motorcycle Autobot civilian, and is blasted by four different Cyber Key powers. The Autobot civilian leads the Autobots to a pattern in the desert, a copy of the Seal of Atlantis. It also has the coordinates to the Jungle Planet. The Autobots create a dimension gate to the Jungle Planet, and send Overhaul through. But an attack by Thundercracker strands Overhaul there without aid. The Autobots try to contact Overhaul, but a storm on the Jungle Planet causes interference. In Scourge's temple, Starscream asks Megatron why they don't crush the Jungle Planet Transformers and take the Jungle Planet's Cyber Planet Key. Megatron reveals they'll use these "beast bots" as long as it's convenient, and then destroy them. While Starscream returns to Earth, Overhaul nearly falls into a canyon of lava and hangs for his life. Meanwhile, the Autobots get a call from a submarine Autobot civilian who found the Seal of Atlantis.
12	"Flame Convoy, the Monstrous Dragon King" ("Deep"); Transliteration: "Kai Ryūō Fureimu Konboi" (Japanese: 怪竜王フレイムコンボイ)	Nobuharu Kamanaka	Manabu Ishikawa	March 26, 2005
On Jungle Planet, Overhaul is rescued by Backstop, meets his apprentice Snarl, and plans to bring peace to their world. On Earth, Scattershot reveals he's afraid of being under water, so Optimus says they should just jump in. The Autobots jump into the water, only to find out they have no idea how to swim. Bud gives them a quick swimming lesson. The Autobots locate the Atlantis pattern at the base of an undersea mountain. Vector Prime opens a door there and heads in to investigate with the Mini-cons and kids. Atlantis turns out to be a massive ancient Cybertronian spaceship that crash-landed into the sea. Megatron, Starscream, and Thundercracker have been tailing the Autobots, and soon the Autobots and Decepticons are battling outside the ship. Inside the ship, Vector Prime, the Mini-cons, and kids find the control room. Vector Prime is forced to warp the craft away to keep it out of the Decepticons' hands. The mysterious Transformer Sideways makes his appearance.
13	"The Fight of Atlantis" ("Ship"); Transliteration: "Atorantisu no Kōbō" (Japanese: アトランティスの攻防)	Isao Takayama	Akatsuki Yamatoya	April 2, 2005
The Autobots and Decepticons move their battle into space, where Vector Prime has taken Atlantis. Sideways reveals himself, puzzling both sides, while Vector Prime and the children discover the Omega Lock's location. Megatron's interference triggers Atlantis's self-destruction, and he and Optimus battle over the Omega Lock while Vector Prime and the others escape. Optimus emerges victorious, and Megatron is lost in the explosion. Once the Omega Lock is in Vector Prime's hands, it ignites space bridges among Earth, Speed Planet, and Jungle Planet through the Cyber Planet Keys. They receive a message from Red Alert on the Speed Planet, but the connection is lost. Optimus, Landmine and Vector Prime go to the Speed Planet, while the rest stay behind and protect Earth. They seem close to saving the universe.
14	"The Great Race Begins!" ("Hero"); Transliteration: "Gurēto Rēsu Kaishi!" (Japanese: グレートレース開始！)	Atsushi Nakayama	Kazuhiko Sōma	April 9, 2005
In episode 13, Ship, Red Alert contacted the Autobots on Earth and asked for Optimus Prime to join them on Velocitron. Ransack and Crumplezone tricked Hot Shot and Dirt Boss into believing that a race between them would determine which of them would be allowed to race Override for the Planet Cup. During the race Ransack and Crumplezone caused a rockslide that buried Hot Shot, but he was saved when Optimus Prime, Vector Prime, and Landmine arrived. Hot Shot was almost killed in the landslide. After Hot Shot woke up, he thought he was useless to the mission. But Optimus eavesdropped on Hot Shot's conversation with Clocker. Although Optimus was upset that Hot Shot had become involved with the locals, Clocker and Brakedown were eager to help the Autobots. After being unable to obtain the Planet Cup from Override herself, Optimus endorsed Hot Shot's plan to win the cup in a race, with the other Autobots aiding him. Ransack and Crumplezone were contacted by Megatron and told to keep on eye on things, so they too decided to enter the race. They could win the cup or at least cause damage to the other racers. The qualification round started with Override, Dirt Boss, Ransack, Crumplezone, Optimus Prime, Hot Shot, Red Alert, Landmine, Clocker, and Brakedown participating.
15	"Bud and Hop's City Trip" ("Race"); Transliteration: "Bado to Hoppu no Tokai Ryokō" (Japanese: バドとホップの都会旅行)	Makoto Nagao	Kazuhisa Sakaguchi	April 16, 2005
The entire Autobot force is on Speed Planet, Override, Dirt Boss, Ransack, and Crumplezone all try to gain victory in the first round of the Great Race. As Ransack and Crumplezone use every dirty trick they know on Speed Planet, back on Earth, Starscream and Thundercracker convince the Autobot Mudflap to defect to the Decepticon side by playing off his dislike of humans. Meanwhile, Bud, Lori and the Mini-cons take a trip to the city where they attempt to locate a recovered Cybertronian artifact, and meet Dr. Lucy Suzuki in the process. The race on Speed Planet ends with Override first, Hot Shot second, and Dirt Boss third. On Jungle Planet, Overhaul challenges Scourge for the Cyber Planet Key.
16	"Beast Reincarnation! Liger Jack" ("Detour"); Transliteration: "Yajū Tensei! Raigā Jakku" (Japanese: 野獣転生！ライガージャック)	Mitsuru Kawasaki	Hiro Masaki	April 23, 2005
On the Jungle Planet, Overhaul does battle with Scourge, only to take a terrible beating. Scourge was about to deliver the final blow when Snarl interferes, saving Overhaul. On Velocitron, the second round of the Great Race commences, bringing obstacles such as stairs and tunnels to the course, as well as more interference from Ransack and Crumplezone who switch the signs. Meanwhile, in a volcano, Overhaul is bathing in lava, training to withstand Scourge's heat attack while Snarl tells him a lesson learned from Backstop. Back at the race, Ransack and Crumplezone's cheating incapacitates Override, leading Hot Shot to save her, much to her confusion. When the race is finished, Dirt Boss is in first place and Hot Shot in second. Meanwhile, Overhaul returns to fight Scourge again. Unfortunately, Snarl is attacked in the course of the battle, and when he and Overhaul are both defeated, Scourge intends to eliminate Snarl for treason. However, Overhaul tries to save him at the risk of his own safety, and manages to channel the power of the Jungle Planet's Key. He scans a carving of a lion, transforming him into Leobreaker!
17	"Link-Up! Liger Convoy" ("Savage"); Transliteration: "Rinkuappu! Raibā Konboi" (Japanese: リンクアップ！ライガーコンボイ)	Matsuo Asami	Hiro Masaki	April 30, 2005
Optimus Prime and Vector Prime arrive on the Jungle Planet to meet up with Overhaul who sent a distress signal, but find that he has become Leobreaker. Red Alert theorizes that Cyber Planet Keys can turn a planet into a mirror image of Cybertron, and reformat Autobots. Optimus and Vector Prime discover that neither Leobreaker, Backstop, nor Snarl sent the distress signal. The trio are forced into battle alongside their new allies Snarl and Backstop against Megatron, Scourge, and their minions. During the course of the fight Optimus and Leobreaker awaken a power from within, combining into Optimus Prime, Savage Claw Mode! Meanwhile, Coby and the Mini-cons sneak off to Speed Planet, where Hot Shot is in preparation for the semi-final round of the Great Race.
18	"Scorching Dead Heat" ("Sand"); Transliteration: "Shakunetsu no Deddo Hīto" (Japanese: 灼熱のデッドヒート)	Nobuharu Kamanaka	Kazuhisa Sakaguchi	May 7, 2005
The second last round of the Great Race begins, taking Hot Shot and the other contestants through the course in the Diablo Desert. As Hot Shot becomes trapped in sinking sand, Brakedown attempts to help him at the cost of compromising his own participation in the race. Dirt Boss is disqualified when Ransack and Crumplezone abandon him, leaving only Ransack, Crumplezone, Hot Shot, and Override in contention. On Jungle Planet, the Autobots and their new friends battle the allied Decepticons after being tricked by threats and a friend trapped under a rockslide. Sideways tells them he is working undercover to compromise Megatron's organization, but his true allegiance is unclear. Landmine contacts Optimus to tell him he found Coby and the Mini-Cons on Speed Planet. Hot Shot convinces Optimus and Jetfire to let Coby stay.
19	"The Planet Cup of Glory" ("Champion"); Transliteration: "Eikō no Pureanetto Kappu" (Japanese: 栄光のプラネットカップ)	Keiichiro Kawaguchi	Kazuhiko Sōma	May 14, 2005
The final race to determine who wins the Planet Cup, and thus the Cyber Planet Key, begins with Override, Ransack, Crumplezone, and Hot Shot as the participants. Coby races with Hot Shot because Hot Shot suffered extensive damage to his internal systems. Ransack and Crumplezone are virtually eliminated early on when they try to steal the Planet Cup, making the race a struggle between Hot Shot and Override. Unfortunately, Hot Shot's links are breaking down. Coby hot-wires him and Hot Shot wins the race and claims the Planet Cup. Megatron arrives to steal the cup, resulting in a brawl between the Autobots and Decepticons. The cup is returned to Hot Shot by Override, who pledges her allegiance to the Autobots after benefiting from Hot Shot's selflessness during the race. The Speed Planet Key is placed in the Omega Lock which results in a lot of data and sends a golden wave across the galaxy. Then a signal of coordinates comes from the Autobot base, alerting them to something strange in the Arctic.
20	"Mortal Showdown Beyond the Aurora" ("Ice"); Transliteration: "Ōrora no Kanata no Shitō" (Japanese: オーロラの彼方の死闘)	Atsushi Nakayama	Akatsuki Yamatoya	May 21, 2005
While investigating strange phenomena at the North Pole, the kids run into Professor Suzuki, who is taking part in a government project to research the same phenomena. Seeing her as a possible ally, Bud and Lori want to tell the Professor about the Transformers' existence, but Coby isn't so sure. Unfortunately, an attack by Starscream and Mudflap may make the discussion moot! Then Scattershot saves them.
21	"Fight! Liger Jack" ("Honor"); Transliteration: "Tatakae! Raigā Jakku" (Japanese: 戦え！ライガージャック)	Mitsuru Kawasaki	Manabu Ishikawa	May 28, 2005
In a confrontation with Megatron and Scourge, Leobreaker lets his temper get the better of him, and, against Optimus' direct orders, attacks Scourge. Scourge defeats him easily, but seems to have developed a grudging respect for the Autobot. Backstop tells Optimus about Scourge's past as well as Snarl and Leobreaker. Long ago, Jungle Planet had no leader until Scourge stepped up. Leobreaker then tells Snarl about his past. Back when he was Overhaul, he was a reckless lone wolf and no one wanted to partner up with him. On one mission, he was trapped under rocks, and was rescued by Optimus who tried to give him cover. Leobreaker realized that Optimus and the team had always looked out for him. Surprisingly, Optimus arrives. Optimus explains that he has been wrong about keeping their mission a secret. Every planet was different and had many customs, and wherever they go, they find people who wanted to help - valuable allies and friends. Optimus realizes that the only way to obtain the Jungle Planet Key is to fight Scourge. He sends Backstop to deliver his message. Megatron is infuriated and Sideways whispers a plan to Starscream.
22	"Lori, to the Beast's Planet" ("Primal"); Transliteration: "Rōri, Majū no Hoshi e" (Japanese: ローリ、魔獣の星へ)	Makoto Nagao	Manabu Ishikawa	June 4, 2005
The stage is set for the final confrontation between Scourge and Optimus Prime. The Autobot team arrives on the Jungle Planet, with Override representing the Speed Planet, and Lori representing Earth. The Decepticons plan a 'welcome party' for the Autobots, which only delays the inevitable confrontation. Later, Optimus Prime and Leobreaker team up to defeat Scourge. Scourge asks Optimus to kill him as he was the loser, but Optimus refuses, claiming that Scourge was a worthy opponent. After receiving the Cyber Planet Key from Scourge, Lori talks him into understanding the merits of teamwork. He apparently agrees, and calls Lori his little sister, which infuriates her. Later, an angry Megatron is seen ranting, raving, and blowing things up.
23	"Decisive Battle! Animatros" ("Trust"); Transliteration: "Kessen! Animatorosu" (Japanese: 決戦！アニマトロス)	Oyunam	Hiro Masaki	June 11, 2005
In this episode a colossal battle spans all the terrain of the Jungle Planet. The Decepticons try to track down the Jungle Planet Key hidden among several decoy boxes protected by Autobots. When opening boxes, Ransack gets punched by a boxing glove and Megatron and Sideways find rocks. Megatron determines that the Key is in the hands of Leobreaker and Snarl. Snarl distracts the Decepticons while Leobreaker beats a tactical retreat. Megatron gloats that Leobreaker is a coward who always has others to back him up. Optimus tells him not to let Megatron get to him. Optimus tells Leobreaker that he trusts him the most. Just as Megatron is about deliver a final blow to the downed Optimus Prime, Optimus's Matrix of Leadership activates the Jungle Planet Key to open a space bridge to Earth, bringing in Autobot reinforcements. Optimus defeats Megatron and gets the Jungle Planet Key. On the way back to Earth, Vector Prime asks how the "secret mission" was going. Jolt says they have an adviser named Suzuki but Coby tells him to keep his vocabulator quiet. Meanwhile, at Earth's North Pole, Professor Suzuki makes an astonishing discovery -- a being trapped in ice! It scans a nearby car and breaks free. Suzuki realizes it is another Transformer. Afar, Colonel Franklin sees his first "robot in disguise".
24	"The Return of the Monsters" ("Trap"); Transliteration: "Kaibutsu-tachi no Fukkatsu" (Japanese: 怪物たちの復活)	Kazuhiko Sōma	Kazuhiko Sōma	June 18, 2005
With the awakening of the monster-hunting Autobot Crosswise, the secret history of Earth begins to be revealed. Starscream sends Megatron after a false lead on the third Cyber Planet Key, while Starscream searches for the Earth Planet Key. Sideways and Starscream follow Crosswise, thinking he will lead them to it. Sideways chases after Crosswise while Starscream finds out what Crosswise was hiding. Meanwhile, the Autobots put the Jungle Planet Key in the Omega Lock and are drawn into the essence of Primus. Using the Mini-cons as mediums, Primus says, "Maintain the balance until all are one." The Polar anomaly draws the Autobots to a hidden cavern filled with terrifying ancient Decepticons, and into a deadly trap set by Starscream! In space, Megatron and his henchmen are trapped by Starscream's booby-trapped fake Planet Map, with Crumplezone outside.
25	"Guardian of the Earth Live Convoy" ("Invasion"); Transliteration: "Chikyū no Shugoshin Raibu Konboi" (Japanese: 地球の守護神ライブコンボイ)	Megumi Sakai	Kazuhiko Sōma	June 25, 2005
Starscream has his Decepticon army in sight of Earth looking for its Planet Key. Crosswise requests assistance from his friend Evac to again imprison the Ancient Decepticons. Meanwhile, Optimus Prime and the other Autobots manage to escape, thanks to Jetfire's help. They head to stop Starscream and the Decepticons from terrorizing Earth, but end up being attacked by the Earth military forces! Evac and Crosswise come to their aid. Meanwhile, the Mini-cons, the children, and their families are taken in by Colonel Franklin and the military.
26	"The Third Planet Force" ("Retreat"); Transliteration: "3-tsu-me no Puranetto Fōsu" (Japanese: 3つ目のプラネットフォース)	Mitsuru Kawasaki; Manabu Ono	Hiro Masaki	July 2, 2005
While the Mini-cons rescue the kids from military custody, Sideways learns the location of the Autobots' base. Soon every Decepticon in North America is descending on Coby's home town. The Autobots realize that to protect the Cyber Planet Keys and the humans of Earth, there's only one option: take the Omega Lock and abandon the Earth base. Evac returns with the Earth Planet Key but is ambushed by Starscream. Evac manages to get away but Starscream keeps coming, despite all the Autobots can throw at him. During the fight, Leobreaker manages to bite off one of Starscream's Energon blades, and Savage Claw Mode finally defeats Starscream. But Starscream reactivates and shoots at the kids. While Optimus is distracted, Starscream steals the Omega Lock. With the Autobots swearing to get it back, Colonel Franklin demands a talk with them.
27	"The Countdown to the Doom of the Universe" ("Revelation"); Transliteration: "Uchū Metsubō e no Kauntodaun" (Japanese: 宇宙滅亡へのカウントダウン)	Atsushi Nakayama	Hiro Masaki	July 9, 2005
With the help of Scourge, Megatron and the Decepticons are finally freed from captivity. They decide to head to Earth, and Scourge joins them. Meanwhile, Starscream places the Earth Planet Key in the Omega Lock, and a space bridge is formed, revealing the black hole to Earth and the entire universe. A transmission is received by the Autobots, and is deciphered by Red Alert and Vector Prime. The message says to bring the Planet Keys and Omega Lock to Cybertron, but does not indicate what will happen. However, the Decepticons appear at Niagara Falls, and the Autobots rush to challenge them. In the battle, Megatron is challenged by Hot Shot, Red Alert, and Scattershot. In the process, Megatron gains a new weapon from Earth's Cyber Planet Key - a gatling gun! Megatron promptly uses his new weapon to seemingly wipe out the three Autobots.
28	"The Reincarnation of the Vanguard Team!" ("Critical"); Transliteration: "Tensei! Bangādo Chīmu" (Japanese: 転生！バンガードチーム)	Matsuo Asami	Kenji Sugihara	July 16, 2005
After being mowed down by Megatron, Hot Shot, Red Alert and Scattershot struggle for their lives. But just in the nick of time they activate a radar dish which sent a beam through the space bridge right to Cybertron redirected at the Omega Lock, sending golden waves that shines down on them and resurrects them into the Cybertron Defense Team. They scan new vehicle form to better combat the Decepticons. Optimus, Evac and Override head for Starscream and the Cybertron Defense team takes on Megatron and Scourge.
29	"The Awesome Guy From Outer Space" ("Assault"); Transliteration: "Uchū kara Sugoi Yatsu" (Japanese: 宇宙から来たスゴい奴)	Makoto Nagao	Hiro Masaki	July 23, 2005
Scattershot gives the kids and Mini-cons access to the base to monitor Optimus. A three-way battle unfolds between the Decepticons, the Autobots, and Starscream's forces. Crosswise was busy recapturing the entire monster Decepticons. The kids discover that a big red ball of something was on its way to Earth- directly to the island. Then, an Autobot warrior named Wing Saber appears. After looking at his files, it seems Wing Saber made a lot of code violations and even tried to attack Optimus once. Wing Saber said he came to Earth because of some signal. Vector Prime realized that the signal was emitted by the Omega Lock when the third Cyber Planet Key was placed in. Jetfire gives Wing Saber a vehicle form an A-10 Warthog. Seeing that the black hole's core had become unstable, Optimus sends the Cybertron Defense Team to check on it. Coby draws a road to the space bridge. Wing Saber battles Megatron, Scourge jumps into the volcano followed by Leobreaker.
30	"The King of Ambition, Ill Will Unleashed" ("Starscream"); Transliteration: "Yabō no Ō Jashin Zenkai" (Japanese: 野望の王 邪心全開)	Naotaka Hayashi	Hiro Masaki	July 30, 2005
As the Autobots descended further into the volcano, Sideways meets them in a faceoff. With him warping, Vector Prime attaches Safeguard to his back, so Optimus could have a clear shot. With the Autobots closing in, Starscream unleashes the Omega Lock's power and grows to a tremendous size. He adorns a crown from the lava, declaring himself "Emperor of the Universe". Vector Prime goes to retrieve the Omega Lock but gets trapped under rubble. Wing Saber rescues him but gets attacked by Thunderblast. Leaving her in the lava, they could head to Cybertron. Meanwhile, the Cybertron Defense Team is sent to check on Cybertron but they find it infested with hundreds of spider-like Transformers called Scrapmetal drones. Overpowered and outnumbered, the kids call Optimus to go to their aid. But he is punched by Starscream.
31	"High Speed Mobile Unit Sonic Convoy" ("United"); Transliteration: "Kōsoku Kidō Gattai Sonikku Konboi" (Japanese: 高速機動合体ソニックコンボイ)	Nobuharu Kamanaka; Megumi Sakai	Akatsuki Yamatoya	August 6, 2005
Override, Evac and Leobreaker are sent to help the Cybertron Defense Team on Cybertron; Megatron's Decepticons follow as well as Thunderblast who joins Megatron. Wing Saber, wanting to link up with Optimus, reminds him of a mission in the Chaar asteroid belt. They were trying to save a man and had to get out of the asteroid belt. They linked up back-to-back, blasting every rock in their way. Unfortunately, Wing Saber slipped and almost didn't make it. Now they were facing the same event as Starscream uses his power to tear the earth apart to create a rock storm. Doing the same thing from Chaar, Optimus and Wing Saber avoid the boulders. Once out of the storm, they combined into Sonic Wing Mode. Going at the speed of light, Optimus avoided the rocks and overpowered Starscream. Sideways warped Starscream away and the Autobots headed to Cybertron.
32	"Transcendental Transformation! The Liberating Power" ("Cybertron"); Transliteration: "Chōzetsu Henkei! Kaihōsareru-ryoku" (Japanese: 超絶変形！解放される力)	Atsushi Nigorikawa	Manabu Ishikawa	August 13, 2005
Override, Evac and Leobreaker were cut off from Cybertron and were cornered by the Decepticons. But charged by the Omega Lock, they head through the vortex. Megatron, Scourge and Thunderblast follow suit. Thundercracker spins out of control, Ransack and Crumplezone stay behind and Mudflap goes back to Earth. On Cybertron, the Defense Team had finally eradicated the Scrapmetal drones. Just then, the rescue team comes in but so does Megatron and Optimus. Megatron steals the Omega Lock but Optimus combines with Wing Saber, followed him into his fiery dimension. Retrieving the Omega Lock, Optimus told Vector Prime to create another dimension gate to seal Megatron's. But Megatron's armor of Unicron allows him to keep the gate open. The Autobots destroyed Megatron by combining the Omega Lock with Vector Prime's sword. They place the Omega Lock beamed to the Autobot Matrix of Leadership in the very core of Cybertron, but it triggers a reaction that seemingly begins to tear apart the planet! But when they retreat back to Cybertron's moons, they discover the planet was really transforming. They saw the creator who existed at the beginning of time, the Transformers' lord, Primus.
33	"The Resurrected Giant God" ("Balance"); Transliteration: "Yomigaetta Kyodai Kami" (Japanese: よみがえった巨大神)	Mitsuru Kawasaki	Hiro Masaki	August 20, 2005
The true form of Planet Cybertron is revealed as the planet-sized Transformer, Primus used as the device to connect and relay the messages of Primus, who begins to speak of things that have long since passed. When the Autobots destroyed Unicron, it caused a rip in time and space which created the black hole. Only he can shut it down. But first, the Autobots must find the last key to fully awaken him. Then, Primus showed images of the four Cybertronian ships heading towards planets. At the fourth one, once the ship reached it, it disappeared. Primus explained that the planet was caught in a wormhole and sucked into an alternate universe. Unfortunately, Primus's energy was spent because Starscream absorbed much of his spark. Before he rested, Primus told the Autobots about the fourth planet. It was Gigantian. But the Autobots didn't know they were being overheard by Sideways, who returns to a being-repaired Starscream. Vector Prime tells everyone that the fourth planet was where the Mini-cons came from. He shows an image of them in their ship, drifting in space. Jolt explains that they were playing hide-and-seek. He also mentions that there aren't only small Transformers on the planet, but bigger ones, too. Meanwhile, the Decepticons were quarreling over who should be leader. Red Alert tried to scan Jolt's memory, which tickles him, but can't find anything. His size and mind is so complex, he seems more human than Transformer. Just then, the Autobots detected Decepticons approaching. During the battle, Scrapmetals blew up Crumplezone and Starscream fires at Primus's head. But everyone was astonished when the creator blocked the shot and activated his weapon systems. Blasting Starscream, the map flies into Vector Prime's hand. Just then, everyone sees a ghostly image of Megatron. In the command center, the kids see Sideways kidnap the Mini-cons. They follow him through a warp gate and end up in a strange place.
34	"Counterattack from the Darkness" ("Darkness"); Transliteration: "Ankoku kara no Gyakushū" (Japanese: 暗黒からの逆襲)	Atsushi Nakayama	Kazuhisa Sakaguchi	August 27, 2005
Megatron returns from the dead but is lost and confused when he sees a dark mist that surrounds him. He uses this mist to first swallow up a Scrap Metal and then to reformat Crumplezone in his own image. He then turns his attention to the Autobots who are somewhat confused as to why they can't destroy them. Leobreaker then realizes that the Decepticons have their fighting spirit back because of seeing Megatron. Meanwhile Safe Guard informs Vector Prime that he's lost contact with Jolt and the children. Optimus Prime sends Vector to investigate why they've lost contact with the mini-cons and the children. He checks the Skydome to find that there's no sign of a struggle or bodies. He then checks the surveillance monitor to find that Sideways has taken Jolt, Reverb, and Six-Speed. He relays a message to Optimus Prime who then asks about Bud, Coby, and Lori. Vector Prime tells Optimus Prime that the children have gone after Sideways. Leobreaker decides to engage Megatron alone and slices into the mist that surrounds the fallen leader but to Leobreaker's surprise Megatron is not dead but has been completely restored due to Unicron's armor. Megatron uses emotional manipulation and the dark side of Leobreaker's heart to create Nemesis Breaker. Nemesis Breaker and Leobreaker then begin a fierce battle which ends in Leobreaker going down. Optimus Prime tells Scourge that he's more concerned about Megatron than he is about him so he leaves Scourge in the middle of the battle feeling rather indignant. Back at the Skydome Red Alert asks Vector Prime if he's already checked the volcano where Starscream was last seen. Vector Prime informs both Red Alert and Scattershot that he had contacted Colonel Franklin on Earth and who has informed him that the volcano has already been cleaned out. Scattershot complains that he gave Coby a mini-communicator and wonders why he hasn't used it to communicate with them. Now in the floating room Coby and Bud are trying to retrieve their communicator so that they can relay a message to the Autobots but it's floating around and they are unable to catch it. Meanwhile the last fit battle between Dark Claw Megatron (Megatron link up with Nemesis Breaker) and Savage Claw Optimus Prime has begun but once the smoke had cleared Optimus realizes that the battle was a ruse that Megatron used to run away and head straight for the Omega Lock.
35	"The Maze of Atlantis" ("Memory"); Transliteration: "Atorantisu no Meiro" (Japanese: アトランティスの迷路)	Atsushi Nakayama	Kazuhiko Sōma	September 3, 2005
As the battle rages on Primus, the kids find out they are in Atlantis again. Though debilitated, Atlantis maintained a minimal atmosphere. Floating through the air vent, the kids came upon the control centre, where Sideways was trying to extract information on Gigantian from Jolt. Unfortunately, he has too much information in his brain and decided to make him a mindless zombie by removing data not on Gigantion. Starscream heads off to get the Omega Lock. Tired of stuff floating around, Sideways turns on the artificial gravity generator and the ship stabilizes. But then after hearing Bud's scream, he does the "Jack and the Beanstalk" thing. The kids slid down a tunnel and almost fell into a fire pit. They were running away from Sideways when Coby purposefully drops his communicator, projecting a holographic image of Megatron. Voicing for Megatron, Coby said to Sideways that he should surrender to the Autobots, hop on one foot and say: "I'm a pretty lady". But his trick was exposed and again they start running. After managing to trap Sideways under rubble, the kids rescue Six-Speed and Reverb. Meanwhile, Starscream forces Thunderblast to steal the Omega Lock for him or he'll blast her to smithereens. Back on Atlantis, the others rescued Jolt and were going to disable the EMS (Electro-magnetic Shield) surrounding the ship when Sideways appears in front of them.
36	"The Great Escape Operation" ("Escape"); Transliteration: "Soreyuke Dasshutsu Dai Sakusen" (Japanese: それゆけ脱出大作戦)	Makoto Nagao	Kenji Sugihara	September 10, 2005
The kids and the Mini-cons managed to get away from Sideways thanks to Jolt. But in a tunnel in direction of the shield controls, they are once again cornered by Sideways who put up a warp shield to prevent Jolt from opening dimension gates. Luckily, after distracting Sideways with "Oh there's Megatron. No, its Optimus Prime", Coby blinds him with Atlantis' fire extinguisher. Running into the engine room, they figure out Sideways had put Atlantis back together. They then set a trap. Meanwhile, Mudflap was wandering the Earth not knowing whom to join. Lugnutz wonders what happened to Starscream. Back on Primus, Thunderblast was having a hard time getting the Omega Lock, so she calls for Starscream's help. Yet he was driven off by the Autobots and Thunderblast chooses not to take the Omega Lock. In Atlantis, the kids cause an explosion in the engine room and sent Sideways down the garbage chute to hit a piece of machinery. Since he put up the warp shield, even he can't warp. Once he's out, he gets hit by a machine. The kids then disabled the Electro-Magnetic Shield to contact the Autobots. Vector Prime, Red Alert and Scattershot went to get them, followed by Ransack, Crumplezone, Nemesis Breaker and Megatron. Starscream returned and set the ship to warp. The kids took the escape pods but one containing Bud, Jolt and Reverb was still in the warp field after bumping into a dazed Sideways. Atlantis warped away, taking everyone inside its field including Ransack and Crumplezone. Coby swore to find Bud and the others.
37	"And So, It's Time to Depart" ("Family"); Transliteration: "Soshite, Tabidachi no Toki" (Japanese: そして、旅立ちの時)	Naotaka Hayashi	Kazuhisa Sakaguchi	September 17, 2005
The Autobots search the entire universe for the Atlantis star ship but it's nowhere to be found. Vector Prime explains that the wormhole can only be entered by the Mini-cons and the children, because they have flexible minds; however, Red Alert says that Vector Prime's sword and Optimus's Matrix can stabilize the wormhole to allow other Transformers in. On Earth, Landmine convinces Mudflap to rejoin the Autobots. In order to rescue Bud, Jolt and Reverb, Coby and Lori decide to go to Giant Planet. Before leaving, they try to tell their families about the Transformers, but their families don't believe them, even when Colonel Franklin and Professor Suzuki show up. Optimus, Vector Prime, Landmine and Six-speed reveal themselves. Optimus assures the children's families that they will be safe. The next day, everything is ready. Lori's mother has cooked some rations for the trip. The Autobots and the kids head off to the wormhole.
38	"Clash of Crushing Ambitions!" ("Titans"); Transliteration: "Gekitotsu! Kudake Chiru Yabō" (Japanese: 激突！砕け散る野望)	Megumi Sakai	Akatsuki Yamatoya	September 24, 2005
Bud and the Mini-cons leave a trail of breadcrumbs (iron boxes) marked with the Autobots' insignia so the Autobots can find them. They were lucky that Jetfire and Wing Saber were able to find their trail, but a battle with Megatron has Sideways warp away Atlantis. After Jetfire and Wing Saber left, a mysterious being named Soundwave and his bird partner Laserbeak tells Megatron he knows where the Giant Planet was. Primus tries to use his spark energy to stabilize the black hole for a little while but Starscream interferes by throwing himself into Primus's stabilizing beam, this causes him to grow to planet size. He then decides to take on Primus. Activating the shields, it bought the Autobots time to restore the energy flow to all the body parts of Primus on time, re-activating him. Even with only 3 Cyber Planet Keys, Primus easily beat up and ravaged Starscream, using Cybertron's two moons as wrecking balls to send him into his old giant state. Sideways bring Starscream in the warp field and Vector Prime reveals that he found the location of the Giant Planet.
39	"Ultra Space-Time Tunnel Breach" ("Warp"); Transliteration: "Chō Jikū Ton'neru Toppa" (Japanese: 超時空トンネル突破)	Matsuo Asami	Manabu Ishikawa	October 1, 2005
Coby was working on a damaged Scrapmetal drone when Optimus assured him that they will rescue Bud. The Autobots learn that the gate to Gigantion could cause the result of their minds leaving their bodies. Luckily, Red Alert had made a vaccine based on technology from Vector Prime's sword to protect the Autobots. Override had brought a spaceship that looks a lot like the Atlantis to make the journey. But it was called the Ogygia, the Cybertronian ship that brought the first Transformers to Velocitron. It was thought a legend until Clocker and Brakedown rediscovered it. Coby and Lori realized that ancient lost continents on Earth. The Autobots were applied the vaccine but Jetfire stay away. He offered to stay behind to protect Primus and Omega Lock. But the creator himself contacted them that he will do it. The Autobots head through the space-time warp tunnel but got attacked by the Atlantis. They couldn't even return fire with Bud on board. Falling into a hole that would trap them in a limbo, Coby reroutes all of the weapon power to the main engines. Then a huge rock was in their way and with all the weapons systems diverted to main engines, they couldn't even blast their way through. On the Atlantis, Bud and the Mini-Cons sabotaged the engines to slow down Starscream. The Autobots burned a hole in the rock, but Coby got electrocuted. When he came to, they were on the other side of the rift. Meanwhile, far ahead, Soundwave brings Megatron right to Gigantion.
40	"Megalo Convoy of Gigalonia" ("Giant"); Transliteration: "Gigaronia no Megaro Konboi" (Japanese: ギガロニアのメガロコンボイ)	Mitsuru Kawasaki	Hiro Masaki	October 8, 2005
Optimus and the Autobots advance to Giant Planet in the starship Ogygia. On the way, there is a reaction on the thermal sensors of the radar, which reveals the presence of a planet. After finding Gigantion, they find that massive cities on the surface and those bits of the planet were torn off and made to form a ring. Searching the entire city, Safeguard brings them to a rock blocking a tunnel. After scratching and blasting, the Kids and the Mini-Cons found a station that has been abandoned. Safeguard explains that the people of Gigantion build cities then abandon them. Once again searching, Scattershot found huge tremors that lead the Autobots right to a construction site. One of the workers accidentally dropped a big girder which was crushed Landmine. Then a big Transformer came in and saved him. Introducing himself as Metroplex, the Autobots ask him about the Cyber Planet Key. Metroplex's friend Quickmix says that the Key is at the center of the planet. Unfortunately, no one can go back to the abandoned cities and the Autobots must respect their traditions. Suddenly, while the Autobots are trying to motivate Metroplex and Quickmix to help them retrieve the Cyber Planet Key of Giant Planet, a worker came in saying that a miscreant named Menasor was wreaking havoc. It was then revealed that Menasor had joined Megatron, hoping to get better respect from the Decepticon Leader. During a battle, Metroplex went against Megatron and used his buzz saw to send Megatron down three levels and Nemesis Breaker into smoke. The Decepticons retreat and Metroplex and Quickmix join the Autobots. Tradition or no tradition, they couldn't let Megatron get his hands on the Key.
41	"The Descent of Master Galvatron" ("Fury"); Transliteration: "Masutā Garubatoron Kōrin" (Japanese: マスターガルバトロン降臨)	Keiichiro Kawaguchi	Kenji Sugihara	October 15, 2005
The Autobots search all over the abandoned cities for the un-erased data on the Cyber Planet Key. Megatron, angered and humiliated after his fight with Metroplex, puts up all his rage by turning into a ghostly form and heads down through the planet's crust. He then finds the Giant Planet Key and tries to take it. Unsuccessful, he emerges, with a black aura surrounding him. With his new power, he easily defeats all the Autobots one by one with no effort. As his aura disappears, he renames himself Galvatron. However, he is defeated by Optimus (by using Metroplex's axe and activating Giant Planet's Cyber Key). With the data recovered by Coby and Lori, the Autobots scout the planet in Ogygia and find Atlantis in a newly created fissure in one of Giant Planet's abandoned cities.
42	"To the Underworld!" ("City"); Transliteration: "Chika Sekai e GO!!" (Japanese: 地下世界へGO！！)	Atsushi Takeyama	Kazuhiko Sōma	October 22, 2005
The Autobots find Atlantis and begin an assault. Starscream sends out Sideways to fight them all alone. In the cargo hold, Bud, Reverb and Jolt hear a strange noise in the vents. Suddenly, a Scrapmetal came out of it. It opened its canopy, revealing Coby at the controls. Soundwave takes Sideways out the battle while Starscream diverted all power from the engines to the weapons. Luckily, Quickmix managed to spray a lot of instant cement on the Atlantis, trapping Starscream. On Ogygia, Coby shows off his Scrapmetal drone suit by transforming it. Though everything was intact, the weapon systems were disabled due to the fact that they were too dangerous. Optimus gives Coby's suit an Autobot insignia with wrenches slashed across. Meanwhile, Soundwave reminds Sideways of something and Galvatron sends his Decepticons to find the Key. The Autobots find that there are four tunnels leading down to the underground and number four is blocked. They once again split up. Lori, Override and Wing Saber are Team 1. Jetfire, Snarl and Leobreaker are Team 2. Team 3 is Cybertron Defense Team. And Team 4 is Optimus, Vector Prime, Metroplex, the Mini-cons and Bud. Landmine, Evac, Coby and Quickmix stay as the backup team. After clearing the way, Team 4 find one of the underground cities with a holographic sky. Ransack and Crumplezone then come in and snatched Jolt, knowing the Autobots won't fire on them. Then Coby shows up and says "Cobybot transform" for his suit. He then throws a ball full of Quickmix's instant cement to trap them. Crumplezone tosses Jolt who is saved by Evac. Optimus gets rid of the gruesome two some with Metroplex's axe.
43	"Showdown! Lori vs. Chromia (Ambush)" ("Fallen"); Transliteration: "Taiketsu! Rōri VS Kuromia" (Japanese: 対決！ローリVSクロミア)	Atsushi Nakayama	Akatsuki Yamatoya	October 29, 2005
Jetfire, Leobreaker and Snarl jump down a hole while Lori, Override and Wing Saber run into Scourge and Thunderblast. Lori snaps at Scourge for abandoning his planet. Scourge tries to make excuses but is cut off by Thunderblast who taunts Lori for being a mouse. Lori gets angry and challenges her, but Thunderblast tricks her and flees. Lori forces Wing Saber to chase after her while Override and Scourge battle to see who is the best planet leader. Meanwhile, Jetfire fights Thundercracker with his new moves while Leobreaker and Snarl search for the Key. Thunderblast leads Wing Saber and Lori across a city right to the water, her natural environment. Lori takes control of the cranes and pins Thunderblast down, then Wing Saber blasts her away. Meanwhile, Jetfire and Thundercracker become seriously damaged. Then the backup team arrives. Coby checks on Jetfire while Quickmix cements Thundercracker. Override and Scourge are still having their fight when Lori comes in and a missed shot from Scourge's axe makes the wall crumble and fall on Lori. Wing Saber saves her but in the confusion, Scourge escapes. He tries to make up an excuse that he was just retreating to fight another day as the elevator closes. Lori kicks a piece of the wall which slides in and a strange device rises from the floor. It projects Gigantion's universe in ancient times. A red planet with two golden rings forming an X descends on Gigantion. Swarms of Sideways, Laserbeak and Soundwave then began invading.
44	"The Secret of Planet X" ("Challenge"); Transliteration: "Puranetto X no Himitsu" (Japanese: プラネットXの秘密)	Megumi Sakai	Manabu Ishikawa	November 5, 2005
Primus does the best he can as the black hole expands even further and the crisis approaches Jungle Planet. Ransack and Crumplezone get blasted away by Optimus. Sideways and Soundwave were discovered by the Cybertron Defense Team and decided to tell them of why they are searching for the Key. They were last survivors of an advanced world called Planet X. When the planet was running out of power, they chose to live on Gigantion. The inhabitants didn't like invaders and knew they were going to be defeated. So they used the Cyber Planet Key to super-size them and their planet to combat the invasion. When Planet X was fought to a stand still, they used their technology to make more dangerous weapons. In the end, they unleashed cannon so powerful that even they couldn't control it. The result destroyed their planet. Now the survivors were going to find the Cyber Planet Key to get revenge. Hot Shot protests that Planet X attacked first. Soundwave counters saying that they will feel the same when Cybertron is destroyed. Laserbeak clouds the Defense Team in smoke that even light couldn't pierce. Red Alert was being hit by multiple copies of Sideways, Hot Shot hears all Autobots saying it was because of him they failed and Scattershot was being confused by two Hot Shots (Right hands were only seen) and decided to quiz on what happened with Jetfire before they entered the space-time hole. The Hot Shot on the left was blasted because it didn't happen and thought it was funny. With the smoke cleared up, the Defense Team blasted the X two. Leobreaker and Snarl wager the leader's throne and challenge Scourge. Scourge was the winner and there was no sign of Leobreaker or Snarl. Meanwhile, Sonic Wing Mode Optimus blasted Ransack and Crumplezone yet again. Override and Lori show up to tell them all about Planet X.
45	"A Small Town With Big Stars" ("Scourge"); Transliteration: "Ōkina Hoshi no Chīsana Machi" (Japanese: 大きな星の小さな町)	Matsuo Asami	Kenji Sugihara	November 12, 2005
Although winner of the fight, Scourge's emotion causes him to hesitate when he keeps thinking about Leobreaker's words. The backup team found Leobreaker and Snarl. Meanwhile, Teams 1 and 4 were going to head down their two last levels while Bud led the Mini-cons. When they exited, they found pictographs of Mini-cons. Lori accidentally pushed a wall tile and Bud and the Mini-cons fell down a shaft. Metroplex explains the tunnel is for Mini-cons. Elsewhere, the Cybertron Defense Team encountered Galvatron and Menasor. Down below, Bud and the Mini-cons land in Microcity, a city built for Mini-cons that was abandoned eons ago. While exploring the museum, Jolt explain that after the war with Planet X, the building were hard to do so some of the Transformers remodeled themselves into smaller forms and their brains were reconfigured to match that of a human. After exploring the park and were heading to the amusement park, they found the city trashed. They run into Scourge who Bud teaches him good leadership skills. The Autobots arrive and Scourge demanded to challenge them. After taking a hard beating from Metroplex and Vector Prime, Sonic Wing Mode Optimus made a slice at him. Falling down, Scourge wanted to be left alone. Meanwhile, the Cybertron Defense Team bested Menasor but was beaten by Galvatron.
46	"The Last Planet Force" ("Optimus"); Transliteration: "Saigo no Puranetto Fōsu" (Japanese: 最後のプラネットフォース)	Makoto Nagao	Kazuhisa Sakaguchi	November 19, 2005
Starscream manages to break out of Atlantis. Teams 1 and 4 had reached the center of Gigantion, an organic place, and head to Lemuria, the starship where the Cyber Planet Key was. They are then ambushed by Galvatron and Menasor. Metroplex goes to fight with the rebel while Optimus fights Galvatron. Not wanting to risk linking up with Wing Saber, Optimus decides to fight Galvatron without any help. Menasor defeats Metroplex and was about to finish the job when Drillbit and Heavyload stepped in the way. Metroplex convinces Menasor that the Decepticons are evil. Meanwhile, Landmine, Coby and Quickmix went searching for the Key while Override and Evac face Galvatron. Optimus was still in denial when Vector Prime literally punched sense into him. He trusts his team as well they trust him. The backup team finds the Cyber Planet Key and are suddenly attacked by Starscream who pushes Quickmix at a wall. Landmine invokes the power of the Cyber Planet Key to enlarge himself to combat Starscream. In the end, he uses his Cyber Tempest to throw Starscream through the ceiling. Optimus uses Metroplex's axe to defeat Galvatron. Once Landmine gives him the Key, he shrinks back to normal size. The Autobots had the Key and were ready to head back to the surface.
47	"The End of Great Ambition" ("Showdown"); Transliteration: "Ōinaru Yabō no Hate" (Japanese: 大いなる野望の果て)	Naotaka Hayashi	Akatsuki Yamatoya	November 26, 2005
Starscream, battered from his battle with Landmine, recovers. The Autobots insert the Giant Planet Key into the Omega Lock and suddenly, it deactivates Gigantion's anti-warp field. The roof from each city opens up to reveal the Space Bridge in the real sky. They are then contacted by Colonel Franklin who says that Primus can't hold the black hole off for long. Scourge comes in and accompanied by Snarl, head off to save the Jungle Planet. Galvatron arrives to take the Omega Lock. When he succeeds, Starscream fights him battle for possession of the Omega Lock. Starscream shows an ability of his to change the mass and weight of his body. Though the Autobots try to intervene, Soundwave and Sideways get in their way. The two most powerful Decepticons unleash a powerful blast of energy that sends the Autobots running for cover. As the smoke clears up, Galvatron is the victor and Starscream, Sideways and Soundwave had disappeared. Galvatron heads through the Space Bridge followed by his henchmen. Vector Prime speculates that Starscream, Sideways and Soundwave were sent into another dimension. The Autobots and kids notice that the Space Bridge is disintegrating.
48	"The Eternal Watcher of Time and Space" ("Guardian"); Transliteration: "Eien no Jikū Kanshi-sha" (Japanese: 永遠の時空監視者)	Kenji Setō	Hiro Masaki	December 3, 2005
The Autobots who were not able to return to their original dimension because of the collapse of the Space Bridge so they attempt to artificially create a Space Bridge of their own with the power of the three Cybertronian ships. After digging out Atlantis and building their Space Bridge Generator, they were successful in creating a bridge. Suddenly, swarms of Laserbeaks came out of them. Outnumbered, Vector Prime had no choice but to destroy the generator. Once he did, the Laserbeaks vanished. Their only other option was to go through the time-space tunnel but it only opens every year. But Vector Prime could use his time powers to send them back to when the tunnel didn't close and when they came to this universe. Jolt interrupts, saying that it could work but the power used will cost Vector Prime his life! Vector Prime was willing to make the sacrifice. When he was traveling the time stream into the future, he found that the black hole had ended time itself. Still, Optimus would not let him make the sacrifice. Vector Prime explains that he had seen cataclysms and wars beyond the reach of time. Even if he is gone, he will still exist as long as time still runs. The Autobots got Lemuria and Atlantis up and running. Vector Prime said good-bye to the Mini-cons and Safeguard. As the three ships are beamed through time to the tunnel they encountered past Ogygia. At the end of the tunnel, they watch as Vector Prime's body is pulled atom by atom. Saluting him, they head off for Cybertron.
49	"The Cybertron Mass Gathering" ("Homecoming"); Transliteration: "Saibatoron Dai Shūketsu" (Japanese: サイバトロン大集結)	Hiroaki Kudō	Kazuhiko Sōma	December 10, 2005
The Autobots split up to find Galvatron. When they returned to Primus, they found he was in the state of recharging. Earth was having major storms and meteor showers sending Jetfire and Evac to help. Elsewhere, Galvatron was using his power to control the black hole. On Velocitron, roads were collapsing so Override goes to save the inhabitants. On the Jungle Planet, it was pulled through the space bridge by a powerful force. The Autobots used Primus to create a bridge to evacuate everyone. But the storms were causing it to fall. Leobreaker set out in Ogygia to save them. Down below, Scourge was willing to stay behind. Snarl tries to snap some sense into him and Scourge's raw emotion cause the temple to break up into the spaceship, Hyperborea. On Velocitron, Override brought everyone to help out. On Earth, the Autobots were helping the citizens while Evac and Crosswise head to the North Pole. Meanwhile, the black hole had swallowed the Jungle Planet. Evac and Jetfire brought every Autobots including the Earth Decepticons. Once everyone was together, Primus' power merges the four ships into the Ark.
50	"The Light of Hope at the End" ("End"); Transliteration: "Shūmatsu no Toki, Kibō no Hikari o" (Japanese: 終末の時、希望の光を)	Atsushi Takeyama	Kenji Sugihara	December 17, 2005
The Autobots confront Galvatron to take the Omega Lock and Planet Keys. However, Galvatron is drawing out the power of the Planet Keys and used it to make his remaining Decepticon troops to grow in size and power. In the midst of the battle between the Transformer forces, the Leaders of each planet face Galvatron. Galvatron uses the Keys to grow and explains his plan to use the black hole to destroy the universe and remake it in his own design. Furious to learn that Galvatron's ambition allowed him to disregard even his own comrades, all the 5 leaders fought and defeated Galvatron together with the combined power of their Cyber Keys. Galvatron sent the Omega Lock and Planet Keys hurtling into the Black Hole in an effort to have it implode everything. The Autobots saw the Planet Keys and the Omega Lock scattered. Each leader got their respective Keys and Optimus heads for the Omega Lock with Coby guiding him. Once Optimus got the Lock, he heard Vector Prime's voice. The Lock and Keys heads for Primus and awakened him. Primus then used the power to destroy the Black Hole using the Ark's main cannon, eliminating the disaster once and for all. Primus transforms back into Cybertron itself, as a beautiful planet with cities, vegetation, roads and atmosphere. Meanwhile, Galvatron's minions abandoned their allegiance to him. On Earth, the kids are reunited with their families.
51	"Galaxy Convoy VS Master Galvatron: Final Battle!" ("Unfinished"); Transliteration: "Gyarakushī Konboi VS Masutā Garubatoron Saishū Kessen" (Japanese: ギャラクシーコンボイVSマスターガルバトロン 最終決戦！)	Manabu Ono	Akatsuki Yamatoya	December 24, 2005
On Cybertron, Optimus can't help but wonder. Galvatron was encouraged by Starscream to continue fighting, (although Starscream was in his imagination). The Autobots built rocket engines to move Jungle Planet back to where it was. Galvatron damaged the rocket boosters, and then challenged Optimus Prime in the command center to a final battle. The Autobots attempted to salvage the situation, along with the remaining Decepticons (after they were free from Galvatron) who arrived to lend them a hand. Meanwhile, both Optimus Prime and Galvatron were ravaged from each other's attacks. Galvatron uses an energy scimitar to cut down one of Optimus Prime's wings, causing serious damage. The ghost of Vector Prime appears before Optimus Prime and urged him not to lose this battle, also lending him the power of his own sword. Using the matrix of leadership, Optimus powers up into a golden mode similar to that of the planet leaders. Optimus Prime and Galvatron battle it out, using their swords. Optimus Prime uses the sword to destroy Galvatron. Galvatron mumbled his last words before he disintegrated, signaling his death.
52	"A New Journey" ("Beginning"); Transliteration: "Aratanaru Tabidachi" (Japanese: 新たなる旅立ち)	Mitsuru Kawasaki	Manabu Ishikawa	December 31, 2005
Representatives of each planet have successively gathered together on Cybertron. The first Space Peace Conference opens with Optimus Prime. Colonel Franklin suggests hiding the Keys and the Omega Lock. Optimus Prime makes a proposal for the construction plan of a new space bridge that would connect the entire universe. All the representatives agreed to the proposal, and the project began. Optimus Prime, who wishes to take part in the project, made Jetfire the new leader of the Autobots. Override passed leadership over to Hot Shot, who won a race despite his weight and size, desiring to take part on the new Space Bridge project as she wanted to race on new planets. Evac and the Earth Decepticons too wanted to go on the project, leaving Crosswise in charge of Earth. Scourge who was unable to find someone who is able to defeat him and become the new leader of Jungle Planet, sent Leobreaker, Undermine and Brimstone on the project instead. Metroplex and the inhabitants of Giant Planet went on the Space Bridge project. A new journey thus begins with the Cybertronian ships heading to the four corners of the universe. Thunderblast, Crumplezone and Ransack become Decepticons again and dragged Thundercracker along with them. In the ending credits, Coby and Lori married while Bud won an Oscar. Colonel Franklin and Dr. Suzuki are also married, with one child and a Second Child on the way. Starscream also emerges from his Inferno dimension and is immediately tracked down by Landmine, Mudflap, and Wing Saber. The agents of Planet X live on elsewhere. Jetfire is seen giving orders and pointing at something in a room full of screens. Also, Galvatron and Vector Prime are both shown to be alive and dueling in a purgatory type setting. With the four Transformer worlds at peace, the heroes bid farewell to old friends and embark upon a whole new adventure. As the humans wave off the mighty Cybertronian ships, the human heroes from the past two shows, Carlos, Rad, Alexis, and Kicker, now each 10 years older than in Energon, are seen in the crowd. Note: Carlos, Rad and Alexis (from Transformers: Armada) and Kicker (from Transformers: Energon) make their cameo appearances here.
