= USS Champion =

USS Champion may refer to the following ships operated by the United States Navy:

- USS Champion (1777) a Continental xebec commanded by Captain James Josiah on the Delaware River in 1777
- USS Champion (1859) an armed river steamer in service during the American Civil War
- USS Champion (AM-314) a World War II minesweeper
- USS Champion (MCM-4) a mine countermeasures ship commissioned in 1991
