= Paul Champ =

French journalist and author

- Born: France
- Citizenship: French
- Occupations: Journalist; Author; Sportsperson

Vice-presidency of the Racing Club de France

Paul Champ was a French sports journalist and author. He played a prominent role in the sports journalism world in France, being the mentor of Géo Lefèvre and one of the co-founders of the Association of Sports Journalists (AJS) in 1905.

Outside journalism, Champ held significant leadership roles in sports organizations, such as the vice-presidency of the Racing Club de France (RCF), and also chaired the Parisian committee of the USFSA.

== Career ==
Champ was a journalist whose passion for sports led him to actively participate in the sports press as well as in sporting institutions. On 5 April 1890, Champ and Adolphe de Palissaux launched Les Sports Athlétiques, a weekly publication that later became the official journal of the Union des Sociétés Françaises de Sports Athlétiques (USFSA); this happened just three months after Pierre de Coubertin had published the first edition of his monthly La Revue athlétique, France's inaugural athletics publication. He was also responsible for writing the first column "devoted to the universal sports movement" in the Revue Olympique, the official quarterly bulletin of the International Olympic Committee (IOC), intending to promote the development of international athletic cooperation, in line with the vision of Coubertin, the father of the modern Olympic Games, since he believed that this movement would not only benefit sports technically, but also foster a sense of noble competition, which he saw as the essence of athletics.

On 26 December 1897, both Champ and Pallissaux attended the 1897 Club Français v English Ramblers football match, but they did so as the correspondents for Le Vélo and Journal des sports respectively. In February 1900, Champ was the editor-in-chief of Journal des sports, where he was responsible for running and skating, while the football articles was under the director of Frantz Reichel. He also played a significant role in mentoring young journalists, such as Géo Lefèvre, who learned the trade under his guidance, and who credited Champ not only as his superior at L'Auto (the future L'Équipe), but also his godfather. In August 1900, Champ published a book about the World Swimming Championships while Lefèvre published one about Swedish swimmers.

He went on to co-found of the Association of Sports Journalists (AJS), an organization that remains active today, and whose first committee, which was elected on 28 February 1905, included the likes of Victor Breyer and Marcel Violette, who like Champ, were also former members of the editorial staff of Le Vélo. The AJS frequently received donations from sports federations, mainly because its treasurer, Paul Champ, was vice-president of the USFSA.

== Writing career ==
Champ was widely recognized as one of the leading sports analysts and writers of his time, particularly in union rugby and football, which he frequently covered in his articles that were then published in the press. His collaboration with golf champion Francois de Bellet resulted in the book Lawntennis, golf, croquet & polo, published by Bibliotheque Larousse in 1930.

== Sporting career ==
Beyond journalism, Champ held significant leadership roles in sports organizations, such as the vice-presidency of the Racing Club de France (RCF), chaired the Parisian committee of the USFSA, and acted as the general commissioner of the 1905 Brussels Sports Congress, which explored the connection between sports and education. When RCF hosted the athletic events of the 1900 Olympic Games in Paris, Paul Champ, together with two other USFSA committee members, were in charge of the club's stand during the event. In July 1897, he was appointed as an athletic sport expert and the official timekeeper of the USFSA for the 1897 French Athletics Championships. He was also an athlete, winning a total of 3,000 francs in cash prizes until 1900, when he had to leave the events following an leg injury.

In April 1907, Champ, now a member of L'Auto, and his colleague Ernest Weber attended a match between the English club Old Etonians and Vieilles Gloires ("Old Glories"), a team made up of fellow retired players from the 1890s, after which he was among the 42 guests for a dinner in which he greeted the ladies present and toasted in their honor.

== Works ==
Lawntennis, golf, croquet & polo
