= Champion (automobile) =

German automobile producer

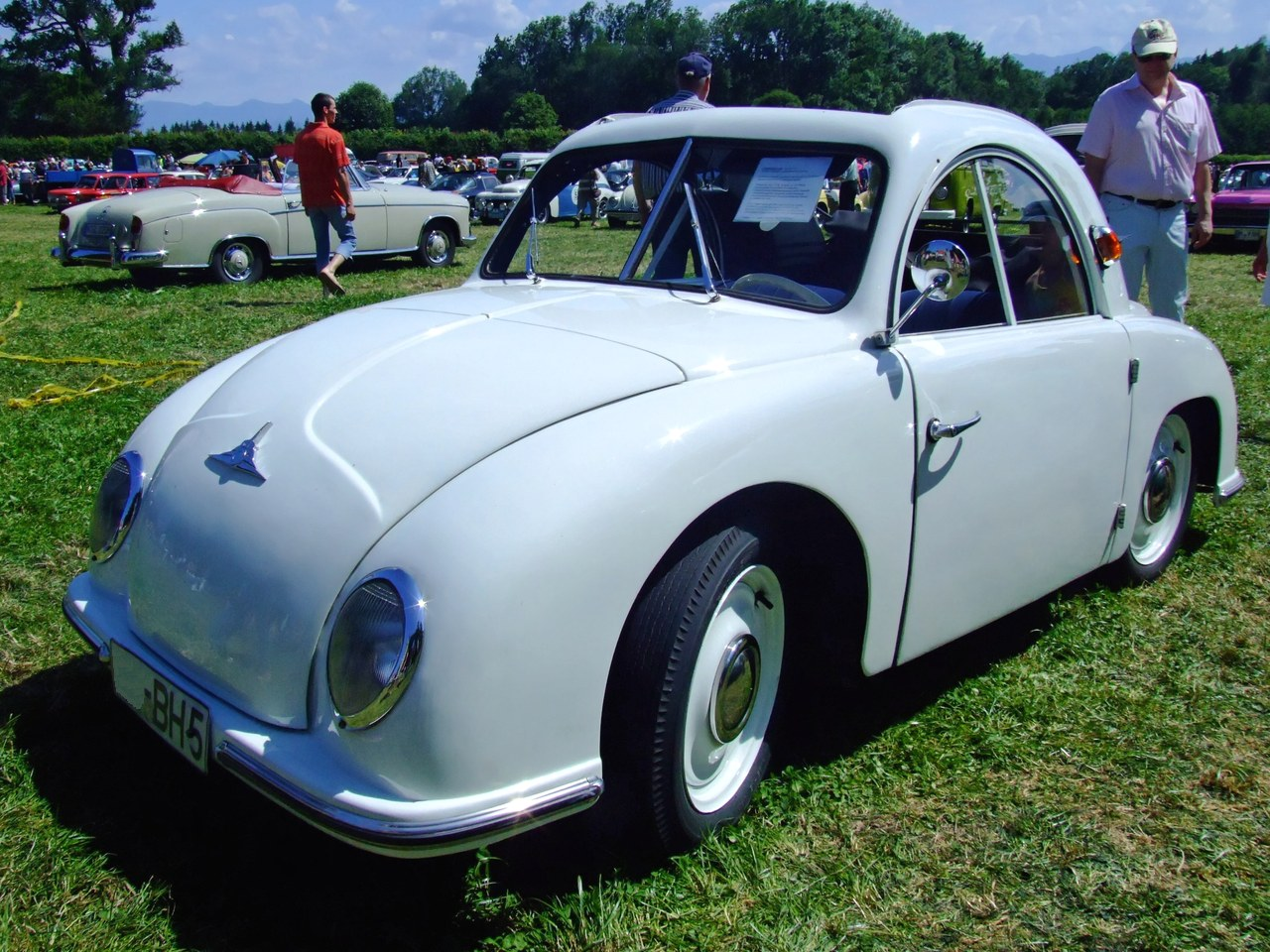
Champion 400 1952

Champion Automobilwerke GmbH was a German producer of small cars, initially manufacturing in Paderborn. The cars were produced and sold by a succession of businesses between 1952 and 1958. At the outset the cars were impressively simple and inexpensive, but as they became slightly less simple they also lost much of their price advantage. As larger manufacturers moved centre stage in the German auto-market, the producers of the Champion failed to achieve the volumes necessary to justify the investment needed to develop and produce the cars: the brief story of the marque is one of a succession of financial crises and failures.

== History ==
The car originally developed by ZF of Friedrichshafen was a two-seater with a single-cylinder 200 cc rear-mounted two-stroke lawnmower engine supported by a supercharger. Power was delivered to the wheels via a three-speed gear box: despite the low weight of the car, there was also a reverse gear. The first prototype was actually built further to the south at Herrlingen near Ulm in 1948. The car was based around a central steel frame and employed a rear-mounted engine, being clearly inspired by the Volkswagen lay-out, but smaller and simpler having regard to the availability of production facilities and materials in the late 1940s.

In 1949 a former BMW engineer then known for his work on early post-war racing cars and named Hermann Holbein acquired the production rights for the car. One year later, Holbein introduced the Champion, which would be assembled at the newly created Champion Automobilwerke plant in Paderborn until 1952. In 1952 production was taken over by the Ludwigshafen based "Rheinische Automobilfabrik Hennhöfer & Co" company. When this business went into liquidation a Dane named Henning Thorndahl took charge of assembling the vehicles until October 1954 when the last car was produced.

In 1955 production was taken over by Maico, a firm then as subsequently better known for its motorcycles.

== Champion 250 ==
The Champion 250 built under Holbein’s direction featured a rear-mounted Triumph (Germany) single-cylinder engine of 250 cc producing a claimed 6 PS or a two-cylinder engine providing a stated 10 PS of output. Weights given for the car vary between 220 kg and 250 kg. It was just 285 cm (724 in) long and 136 cm (345 in) wide. The single-cylinder version was said to be capable of 60 km/h (37 mph) and the two-cylinder version of 70 km/h (44 mph).

The specification of the car was basic. The steel dish wheels were of a thinness commonly associated with basic motorcycles and needed therefore to be pumped to a relatively high pressure. The hardness of the tires and the minimalist approach taken to shock absorption made the cars strikingly uncomfortable. Except for users of cabriolet versions with the roof open, above average agility was vital for anyone wishing to get in or out of a Champion. Driver fitness was also encouraged by the need to start the engine with a starting handle, there being no electric starter-motor.

The selling price was initially, DM 2,400 rising to DM 2,650 for the twin-cylinder version: this compares with DM 5,300 then being asked for a Volkswagen Beetle. 225 or just under 400 of the cars were produced. Sources differ.

== Champion 400 / 500 ==
In 1951 the twin-seater cabriolet-saloon Champion 400 was presented with a full-width canvas roof reminiscent of the open-topped Fiat Topolino though in other respects the overall architecture of the design remained closer to Wolfsburg than to Turin. The steel bodied car was reported to be notably more solidly constructed and the suspension had gained both in sophistication and in terms of ride comfort. The weight of the car was now virtually doubled as against the original 250 model, to 520 kg, and road-holding on the corners became more challenging.

Power came from a two-cylinder 398 cc ILO engine. Output was now given as 14 PS, and the maximum speed increased to 80/85 km/h (50/53 mph). Between 1951 and 1952 around 2,000 were produced. However, the car no longer occupied the price niche of its predecessor, the price having increased by the start of 1951 to DM 4,300, which almost matched the price of the Volkswagen Beetle, which had itself recently undergone a substantial price reduction supported by increasing production and sales volumes.

After Champion production moved south from Paderborn to the Hennhöfer plant at Ludwigshafen, the original Champion business collapsed. The Ludwigshafen Hennhöfer company, which was by now assembling the cars on behalf of Champion, nevertheless committed to persist in producing the cars. The engine was switched to a 16 PS Heinkel unit, and the model name was changed from 400 to 400 H. Roughly a further 1,941 of the cars were built in Ludwigshafen on this basis before Hennhöfer, in its turn, collapsed in 1953.

The Danish entrepreneur Thorndahl struggled to revive the business in 1953/54. Under his watch 1953 saw the introduction of the Champion 500G, an estate version of the car with a steel-timber body and a 452 cc Heinkel 18 PS engine. However, only 20 of the 500G models were produced, and in total output under Thorndahl amounted only to 300 vehicles.

== Maico MC 400 ==
Maico was also based in the south-west of Germany, at Ammerbruch-Pfäffingen near Tübingen: their purchase of the Champion assets was triggered by the low "liquidation" price at which they were available following the collapse of earlier producers of the car.

Following the Maico takeover the two-seater car was rebranded as the Maico MC 400. A four-seater version, the Maico MC 403, was also developed by Maico's Technical Chief, Ulrich Pohl, who till then had never had any involvement in auto-design. In order to accommodate the back seats the car was lengthened from 320 cm to 340 cm and the weight increased to 585 kg. The two-cylinder 400 cc engines were motor-cooled and gave a stated 15 PS of output.

1955 saw the appearance of the Maico 500 with the 452 cc Heinkel 18 PS engine. The car retailed for just DM 3,665, but it is not clear whether the reduced price resulted from reductions in production costs or from ever more heroic assumptions as to the volume sales over which fixed costs could be amortized. Bodies were by now being built by Baur of Stuttgart. 1957 saw further reworking of the chassis, but driving characteristics remained fussy: the competition had also moved on and the now aging design fell short of market expectations in terms of detailed finish and the high level of interior noise. Neither the two-seater nor Pohl's extended four-seater were strikingly beautiful.

By 1956 Maico had produced approximately a further 800 of the Champion-designed cars, including a further 21 of the 500G models, sold at a loss-leader price of just DM 4,050.

Shortly before automobile production came to an end, another sports coupe, the Maico 500 Sport Cabriolet, was shown to the public. Ten pre-production prototypes were built by Thun-based coach-builder Beutler Brothers. There were hopes of finding financial salvation by selling the little cars in the US. The hopes proved illusory, however, as the money ran out. Early in 1958 Maico hastily pulled out of automobile production, narrowly avoiding bankruptcy, returning the focus of their business to motorcycles.

By March 1958, Maico had produced about 5,000 or 7,100 of the Champion-based Maico cars. Again, sources differ.

== Sources and further reading ==
- Hansjörg Dach: Champion - eine Legende. Eine Idee vor 50 Jahren. (= Zur Geschichte der ZF Friedrichshafen AG, Band 5) - Friedrichshafen: ZF Friedrichshafen AG, 1997.
