= Champ (nickname) =

Champ is a nickname of:

== Athletes ==
=== American football ===
- Champ Anthony (born 2004), American college football player
- Champ Bailey (born 1978), American former National Football League player
- Champ Boettcher, American National Football League player in the 1926 season
- Champ Henson (born 1953), American former football player

=== Baseball ===
- Champ Cooper, Negro league first baseman in the 1910s
- Champ Osteen (1877–1962), American Major League Baseball player
- Champ Summers (1946–2012), American Major League Baseball player

== Entertainers ==
- Champ Hood (1952–2001), American singer and multi-instrumentalist
- Champ Lui Pio, Filipino guitarist and singer Arthur Lui Pio (born 1982)

== Politicians ==
- Champ Clark (1850–1921), American politician and attorney, Speaker of the United States House of Representatives
- Champ Edmunds (born 1963), American politician

== In other fields ==
- Champ Ferguson (1821–1865), Confederate guerrilla during the American Civil War
