= Champs (brand) =

Brazilian sporting goods manufacturer

Champs is a sporting goods manufacturer.

== History ==
Champs is part of the group P. Leandrini and was the licensed company that operated Rhumell in Brazil, but decided to create its own brand starting in 2007. Champs also sponsored the NBA in Brazil, but the contract between the two organizations was not renewed. Besides sponsoring various clubs, Champs also produces various football equipment.

== Clubs ==
Today Champs produces sporting materials for Brazilian football clubs like Bragantino and Paulínia FC.
