= List of Transformers: Cyberverse episodes =

The following is a list of episodes from the series Transformers: Cyberverse.

== Series overview ==
Season	Episodes	Subtitle	Originally aired		Network
Season	Episodes	Subtitle	Season premiere	Season finale	Network
1	18	None	September 1, 2018	December 29, 2018	Cartoon Network
2	18	Power of the Spark	September 7, 2019	January 4, 2020	Cartoon Network
3	26	Bumblebee Cyberverse Adventures	March 15, 2020	June 7, 2020	Cartoon Network
4	2	Bumblebee Cyberverse Adventures	November 22, 2021	December 22, 2021	Netflix

== Episodes ==
=== Chapter One (2018) ===
No. overall	No. in season	Title	Directed by	Written by	Original release date	Prod. code	U.S. viewers (millions)
1	1	"Fractured"	Robert Cullen; Ehud Landsberg	Randolph Heard	September 1, 2018 (Note: This episode was first released online on August 27, 2018.)	101	0.36
On planet Earth, Bumblebee is saved by his old partner Windblade, the latter having ventured to Earth from Cybertron through a Spacebridge to search for the mystical AllSpark. Bumblebee, however, has no memory of her or who he is. Windblade then questions Bumblebee, discovering the latter has amnesia. She is then attacked by a Decepticon Seeker named Thundercracker. Despite her best efforts, the Seeker overpowers her. Bumblebee intervenes, diverting Thundercracker's attention before beating him back with assistance from Windblade. Heading off to a deserted location, Windblade attempts to enter Bumblebee's mind via a psychic patch only for the attempt to fail.
2	2	"Memory"	Jean Texier	Zac Atkinson	September 8, 2018	102	0.51
While Thundercracker and another Seeker, Nova Storm, fly across the desert, they notice an energy blast from Windblade's failed attempt to enter Bumblebee's mind and advance on the Autobots' location. The two Autobots engage the Seekers with Windblade holding them off until she and Bumblebee escape. Having an idea from the encounter, the two Autobots head off to find the Seekers' ship. Breaking into the ship to use it for more computing power, Windblade attempts to use the psychic patch procedure on Bumblebee again, hoping to learn the location of the Autobot ship called the Ark through Bumblebee's memories. Windblade only unscrambles the moment the Ark launched, but through that memory, Bumblebee manages to remember who Windblade is. Unfortunately, another Decepticon, Seeker Commander Starscream, contacts the ship with an oblivious Bumblebee responding to Starscream's call.
3	3	"Allspark"	Robert Cullen; Ehud Landsberg	Gavin Hignight	September 15, 2018 (Note: This episode was first released online on September 14, 2018.)	103	0.43
With the Decepticons fully aware of the Autobots' presence on Earth, Windblade and Bumblebee hijack the ship and fly it to a radio tower to shake off their pursuers. Taking advantage of the cover, Windblade psychically directs Bumblebee to more memories concerning the war back on their home planet, Cybertron, the former leading the latter to remember the AllSpark, a powerful artifact responsible for the creation of their race. Bumblebee then remembers how the AllSpark saved his life while he was carrying it to a safe location to hide it. He also recalls the battle against the Decepticons in which his old friend and leader of the Autobots, Optimus Prime, ejected the AllSpark from Cybertron by throwing it into a Spacebridge. Remembering his commander's name, Bumblebee is assured by Windblade that Optimus is still out there.
4	4	"The Journey"	Jean Texier	Eugene Son	September 22, 2018 (Note: This episode was first released online on September 21, 2018.)	104	0.46
Bumblebee remembers the time when the Ark's Energon supply ran dry, causing Optimus to bring him and another Autobot, Grimlock, to an uninhabited planet in search for Energon. There, the group encounters swarms of dangerous cave-dwelling insect-like creatures though they also find a pool of Energon. As the Autobots try to fend off the cave creatures coming for them, Optimus realises that the creatures, who also feed on Energon, were trying to defend their source of food and decides to leave them in peace. Upon returning to the Ark with his team, Optimus orders all Autobots to enter stasis to conserve their energy while the ship scans for the AllSpark. Back in the present and in his mind, Bumblebee resolves to find the Ark.
5	5	"Whiteout"	Robert Cullen; Ehud Landsberg	Kate Leth	September 29, 2018 (Note: This episode was first released online on September 28, 2018.)	105	0.49
Windblade, despite searching Bumblebee's memories, is unable to find any useful information on the location of the Ark, only finding a clue through a memory of an icy mountainside. Heading off to the Himalayas, Windblade uncovers an empty stasis pod underneath the snow but ends up getting trailed and captured by the Seekers who picked up on her conversation with Bumblebee. Their captain, Slipstream, interrogates Windblade for the location of the other Autobots but the latter breaks free and fends off the Decepticons before escaping. Upon returning to Bumblebee, Windblade returns his old blaster and explains her adventure, now certain that the Ark is somewhere on Earth.
6	6	"Megatron Is My Hero"	Jean Texier	Peter Di Cicco (Note: Eugene Son's name was initially credited by mistake.)	October 6, 2018 (Note: This episode was first aired in Canada on September 30, 2018.) (Note: This episode was first released online on October 5, 2018.)	106	0.43
Bumblebee goes through a memory of Megatron, a former gladiator turned equal rights advocate who then established the 'Decepticon' movement at a rally with Optimus as one of his allies. Later on, Optimus travels with Bumblebee to meet Megatron only for the two to come across many atrocities at Megatron's headquarters. Finally, when Optimus confronts Megatron, the latter declares war on Optimus and his followers. As the war between the Autobots and Decepticons on Cybertron raged on, Bumblebee goes on a mission to spy on Megatron but is caught by two Decepticons, Soundwave and Shadow Striker. Megatron reveals his plans to use the supercomputer Vector Sigma and the AllSpark to create a new generation of Decepticons to Bumblebee before tearing out the latter's voice box. Having been shaken by that memory, Bumblebee wonders how he considered Megatron as his hero.
7	7	"Cube"	Robert Cullen; Ehud Landsberg	Randolph Heard	October 13, 2018 (Note: This episode was first aired in Canada on October 7, 2018.) (Note: This episode was first released online on October 12, 2018.)	107	0.46
Bumblebee relives a memory of his favorite sport called Cube. Many years before the war on Cybertron, Bumblebee tries to enter the sports stadium to watch the Cube World Championship but is thrown out in all of his attempts. He later recalls how he met Windblade, a newcomer from Caminus who possesses Cityspeaker powers allowing her to telepathically speak to him. Windblade and Bumblebee later come across a young Starscream with two other Seekers intending to employ a rogue cube out of boredom of watching the Cube match. The two then foil the Seekers' ploy before Bumblebee asks Windblade to hang out with him and his friends at his favorite hangout.
8	8	"Terminal Velocity"	Jean Texier	Gavin Hignight	October 20, 2018 (Note: This episode was first aired in Canada on October 7, 2018.) (Note: This episode was first released online on October 19, 2018.)	108	0.42
Bumblebee delves into a nightmarish memory of his visit to Velocitron where he and his travelling companion, Hot Rod, meet one of its residents, Blurr. He also catches wind of an infectious disease called the Plague of Rust infecting many Cybertronian territories but does not report it to his two companions. The trio then discover that the Plague of Rust is rapidly infecting Velocitron, having been brought in by an infected bot arriving there. As the group takes refuge in Blurr's hideout, they are discovered by an infected Velocitronian, causing Blurr to send Hot Rod and Bumblebee to the Spacebridge to escape Velocitron. While Bumblebee and Hot Rod escape, Blurr, having been infected as well, disintegrates but not before he shuts down the Spacebridge to prevent any further infection on other Cybertronian territories. Meanwhile, back in the real world, Windblade tries to fend off the Seekers who have located their ship, facing off with Slipstream again.
9	9	"Shadowstriker"	Robert Cullen; Ehud Landsberg	Kate Leth	October 27, 2018 (Note: This episode was first aired in Canada on October 14, 2018.) (Note: This episode was first released online on October 26, 2018.)	109	0.43
Bumblebee recalls a memory of his arch-enemy, Shadow Striker. During the war back on Cybertron, Shadow Striker and her team inform Megatron that they have captured Optimus Prime. Bumblebee, having followed them, frees Optimus before engaging Shadow Striker, with the skirmish ending with the Autobot scout firing a stray shot at a large pile of explosive Energon, the resulting explosion taking the Decepticon with it. Shadow Striker is later repaired by Decepticon scientist Shockwave using the remains of her team. She later engages Bumblebee again to take her revenge on him. Bumblebee, however, spares her and lets her go even when Grimlock attacks her.
10	10	"MacCadam’s"	Jean Texier	Zac Atkinson	November 3, 2018 (Note: This episode was first aired in Canada on October 14, 2018.) (Note: This episode was first released online on November 2, 2018.)	110	0.39
When Bumblebee briefly mentions visiting Maccadam's, Windblade psychically directs him to a memory of his old hangout. Back on Cybertron before the war, Bumblebee introduced Windblade to Maccadam's Old Oil House, explaining its history and stating of rumours that its owner, the pacifist Maccadam, was one of the Thirteen original Primes who can mysteriously see into the future. Later during the war, Maccadam prevents an imminent brawl in his bar when a Decepticon named Deadlock (who would change his name to Drift) tried to defect to the Autobots. Much later, he tells a visiting Windblade and Bumblebee that the two will meet again in the future, also mentioning that they will need to find the "king of the dinosaurs" to assist them in their search for the AllSpark. Back in the present, the two Autobots finally get a clue to the Ark's location, having picked up some useful information through Bumblebee's memories.
11	11	"Sabotage"	Ehud Landsberg	Dan Salgarolo	November 10, 2018 (Note: This episode was first released on YouTubeTV and OnDemand in October 26, 2018 and online on November 11, 2018.)	111	0.39
Back on Cybertron, Shockwave attempts to enter Bumblebee's mind, sabotaging Windblade's psychic connection to Bumblebee. Shockwave then leads Bumblebee to a 'memory' that reveals the latter as a spy working for Megatron. Meanwhile, Windblade struggles to gain control of their ship which is heading for the Seekers and ends up getting captured by Slipstream again. Windblade manages to break out but discovers their ship is now under Slipstream's control. Back in his mind, Bumblebee deduces that the memory Shockwave presented to him is fake (since Optimus would never kill anyone). He then returns to the real world where he hits the ship's self-destruct button and escapes with Windblade.
12	12	"Teletraan-X"	Jean Texier	Kevin Burke and Chris "Doc" Wyatt	November 17, 2018 (Note: This episode was first aired on November 10, 2017 in Singapore.) (Note: This episode was first released on YouTubeTV and OnDemand on October 26, 2018 and online on November 16, 2018.)	112	0.41
As Windblade and Bumblebee attempt to hide from the Seekers, they pick up a distress signal. Following the signal, the two Autobots head to an abandoned missile silo and find a drone called Teletraan-X. They try to ask it for the location of the Ark only to be ambushed by the Seekers. Slipstream attempts to force Bumblebee to reveal the location of the Ark by torturing Windblade but Teletraan-X frees the two Autobots. The Autobots make their escape from the missile silo, intending to protect Teletraan-X since it supposedly knows the location of the Ark. Unfortunately, the Decepticons gain on the Autobot group, forcing Windblade to stay behind to stall them while Bumblebee escapes with Teletraan-X.
13	13	"Matrix of Leadership"	Ehud Landsberg	Brandon Auman	November 24, 2018 (Note: This episode was first aired on November 17, 2017 in Singapore.) (Note: This episode was first released online on November 23, 2018.)	113	0.42
Hiding at another location, Bumblebee learns that Teletraan-X has no knowledge of the Ark's location. However, the drone, which proves capable of running memory diagnostics, leads Bumblebee to some memories of his leader, Optimus Prime. Back during the beginning of the war on Cybertron, Optimus was passed on the Matrix of Leadership from a dying Alpha Trion despite the former's worries and regrets. Later on, Optimus rescues an Autobot soldier named Prowl from Decepticon lines. Much later, Optimus and Bumblebee fend off Starscream and his team of Seekers, after which, Optimus expresses his regret over dooming Cybertron but resolves to return the AllSpark back to the planet to revitalise it. Having learnt from the three memories concerning Optimus Prime, Bumblebee heads off with Teletraan-X to rescue Windblade.
14	14	"Siloed"	Jean Texier	Mairghread Scott	December 1, 2018 (Note: This episode was first aired on November 17, 2017 in Singapore.) (Note: This episode was first released online on November 30, 2018.)	TBA	0.34
Slipstream and her team of Seekers attempt to probe Windblade's mind to retrieve information on the Ark's location. Slipstream ends up using a mind rip on the Autobot while she contacts Starscream and Shockwave, but the mind rip causes Windblade to release a psychic pulse that knocks out the Decepticons. Windblade breaks herself out and accesses the Seekers' files before getting discovered by Thundercracker and Acid Storm. Windblade engages the Seekers, but struggles against Slipstream before Bumblebee and Teletraan-X rescue her. Reuniting with the two allies, Windblade explains that she managed to learn the location of another Autobot from looking through the Decepticons' files.
15	15	"King of the Dinosaurs"	Ehud Landsberg	Randolph Heard	December 8, 2018 (Note: This episode was first aired on December 2, 2017 in France.) (Note: This episode was first released online on December 7, 2018.)	TBA	0.31
Windblade, Bumblebee and Teletraan-X salvage a deactivated robot Tyrannosaurus Rex which Teletraan-X identifies as Grimlock who was also one of the Autobots who fell out of the Ark. Teletraan-X also reveals that it was deployed as a backup drone of the Ark's supercomputer Teletraan-1 to preserve the memory banks of the ship. When the group reactivates Grimlock from stasis with an electrical transformer, the Autobot runs amok until the drone pacifies it. Grimlock leads the others to a mountainside bunker where it is revealed that he was also looking for the Ark. After revisiting an old video log in his bunker, Grimlock properly introduces himself to the others in robot mode, having regained his memories.
16	16	"The Extinction Event"	Jean Texier	Kate Leth	December 15, 2018 (Note: This episode was first aired on December 2, 2017 in France.) (Note: This episode was first released online on December 14, 2018.)	TBA	0.32
As Grimlock explains to the others that he had employed the help of Earth's dinosaurs in his search for the Ark, Teletraan-X interrupts, detecting a Decepticon ship in Earth's orbit. Shockwave reveals his plan to eradicate all life on Earth to find the AllSpark by shutting down Earth's geomagnetic fields. The Autobots travel to the North Pole to shut down the Decepticons' magnetic disruptor, fighting off the Decepticons guarding it. Grimlock eventually foils Shockwave's plan when he transforms and destroys the disruptor and the ship with it. The Autobots then escape on a cargo plane they found earlier, unaware that one of Shockwave's drones has sneaked into the plane.
17	17	"Awaken Sleeping Giants"	Ehud Landsberg	Zac Atkinson	December 22, 2018 (Note: This episode was first aired on December 15, 2017 in Singapore.) (Note: This episode was first released online on December 21, 2018.)	TBA	0.27
Grimlock and Teletraan-X successfully pinpoint the Ark's location in the Pacific Northwest. With that information, the Autobot group heads off to Mount. St Hilary only to get attacked by the Seekers who destroy the Autobots' plane. The team fends off the Decepticons, learning of the impending arrival of the Decepticon fleet during the fight. As a result, the Autobots quickly venture deeper into the mountain in search for the Ark and the other Autobots. Grimlock, using his fire-breath gained from falling into lava, tunnels their way to the Ark, with everyone unaware of one of Shockwave's drones following them throughout their journey.
18	18	"Eruption"	Jean Texier	Gavin Hignight	December 29, 2018 (Note: This episode was first aired on December 15, 2018 in Singapore.) (Note: This episode was first released online on December 28, 2018.)	TBA	0.26
The Autobot group finally finds the Ark buried beneath Mount St. Hilary but is discovered by a group of Decepticons led by Shockwave on a mission to destroy the ship. Amidst the ensuing fight, Bumblebee is sent to the Ark with Teletraan-X to awaken the other Autobots in there. Teletraan-X, despite being blasted by Shadow Striker, manages to fully upload itself into the Ark's systems in place of the permanently deactivated Teletraan-1. Meanwhile, Shockwave causes a volcanic eruption to destroy the ship and its crew though it inadvertently turns the tide of the battle in the Autobots' favor. Teletraan-X drives away the Decepticons using the ship's weapons, but struggles to shut down the Autobots' stasis pods. However, it successfully activates the ship's shields, saving all inside it. Teletraan-X then completely reawakens all Autobots right before Decepticon reinforcements and their warship, the Nemesis, arrive on Earth.

=== Chapter Two: Power of the Spark (2019–20) ===
No. overall	No. in season	Title	Directed by	Written by	Original release date	Prod. code	U.S. viewers (millions)
19	1	"Sea of Tranquility"	Jean Texier	Randolph Heard	September 7, 2019	201	0.25
The Autobots and Decepticons resume their war on Earth, with Megatron attempting to slam the Moon into the planet and search for the AllSpark through the debris afterwards. As the battle on the Moon continues, Megatron engages Optimus Prime only to get severely wounded by the latter. Megatron then contacts Starscream to assist him but the Seeker Commander repeatedly ignores his requests for help, commanding Slipstream to activate the forcefield to prevent the Autobots from interfering with their plans. An irate Megatron manages to arrive at the forcefield's area just in time and names Slipstream the new commander of the Seekers, much to Starscream's chagrin.
20	2	"Bad Moon Rising"	Ehud Landsberg	Gavin Hignight	September 14, 2019	202	0.28
While Megatron and Shockwave discuss their secondary plan to smash the Moon into Earth, Starscream downs a still injured Megatron as revenge for his repeated humiliation. With Megatron apparently deactivated, Starscream claims leadership of the Decepticons. As the Autobots break into the Moon base, Starscream evacuates all but Megatron from it, setting the controls for Shockwave's planetary engines to self-destruct. The Autobots foil Shockwave's secondary plan and save Earth by reversing the planetary engines' thrust. Meanwhile, a still living Megatron violently confronts Starscream and seemingly kills him, leaving his body on the Moon. As Optimus sends a transmission to the people of Earth that the threat has ended, Bumblebee notices a mysterious creature on the Moon...
21	3	"The Visitor"	Jean Texier	Zac Atkinson	September 21, 2019	203	0.23
Autobot inventor and scientist Wheeljack shows off some of his new inventions to Optimus Prime only for one of them, the Hyper Fuel, to prove too effective for official usage. When Grimlock consumes the Hyper Fuel, he ends up going on a rampage until Optimus and a few other Autobots trap the rampaging Grimlock using two of Wheeljack's new inventions. Meanwhile, Bumblebee searches for answers concerning the mysterious creature he saw on the Moon; with help from another Autobot comrade, Arcee, he identifies it as a cheetah. However, when Bumblebee brings Hot Rod along to pursue the cheetah, Hot Rod disappears when he follows the creature into a cave.
22	4	"Bring Me the Spark of Optimus Prime"	Ehud Landsberg	Mae Catt	September 28, 2019	204	0.28
Megatron makes an announcement to his troops, stating that whosoever brings him the spark of Optimus Prime will be named the new second-in-command of the Decepticons. Megatron's troops scuffle with one another over who will kill Optimus while Shockwave and Soundwave scheme against each other and Slipstream tries to find her Seekers. Hot Rod, who was chasing the mysterious cheetah, ends up arriving in front of two Decepticons, Lockdown and Clobber, who capture him and bring him to Megatron. Megatron then offers a trade to Optimus to give his life for Hot Rod's. However, Hot Rod breaks out and escapes the Nemesis while Megatron notices the cheetah Hot Rod was pursuing.
23	5	"Trials"	Jean Texier	Peter Di Cicco	October 5, 2019	205	0.32
Both Autobots and Decepticons scour a series of Groundbridges on Earth (due to the AllSpark's presence on the planet) in search for the AllSpark until they locate it in Africa. Optimus and Megatron then venture through their own Groundbridges to a cave where the AllSpark resides in. They both discover each other and the cheetah, who reveals himself to be Cheetor, guardian of the AllSpark. Cheetor, after unsuccessfully accessing the visitors' knowledge, uses the power of the AllSpark to make new armaments for both to fight each other and prove they are worthy of taking the AllSpark. However, a still living Starscream swoops in, steals the artifact and escapes. Meanwhile, Slipstream tries to locate her Seekers, eventually finding out they were taking orders from Starscream. Optimus soon returns with Cheetor who has allied himself with the Autobots.
24	6	"Dark Birth"	Ehud Landsberg	Randolph Heard	October 12, 2019	206	0.28
Cheetor explains his origins as the guardian of the AllSpark to the Autobots while Megatron fumes over Starscream's theft of the AllSpark and Vector Sigma. Meanwhile, Starscream taps into the AllSpark's powers to make a new armor for himself as well as dangerous insectoid creatures known as Scraplets as he announces his plans to terminate all Transformers. Meanwhile, the Autobots, believing Megatron now has the AllSpark, storm the Nemesis on a mission to get it back. As they and the Decepticons engage each other, Cheetor discovers the Decepticons do not have the AllSpark in their possession, causing Megatron to finally admit the truth with Cheetor explaining about Starscream's survival.
25	7	"Parley"	Jean Texier	Gavin Hignight	October 19, 2019	207	N/A
Slipstream, unconvinced by Starscream's plans, barely escapes when Starscream sends his army of Scraplets after her. Meanwhile, the Autobots and Decepticons stop fighting as Optimus and Megatron try to negotiate, agreeing that Starscream's possession of the AllSpark and Vector Sigma poses a great threat to both sides. However, both Autobots and Decepticons still do not trust each other. Slipstream arrives back at the Nemesis to warn the others of Starscream's plans, only to be cut off by the other Decepticons. She approaches Windblade for help but a Decepticon named Bludgeon kills her, causing the Autobots and Decepticons to fight each other again. As a result, Megatron calls off the negotiations, leaving Optimus and his followers to deal with Starscream by themselves.
26	8	"Starscream's Children"	Ehud Landsberg	Mae Catt	October 26, 2019	208	N/A
The Autobots head back to the Nemesis after receiving a distress call from the Decepticons. Upon arrival, they discover lifeless Decepticon bodies drained of Energon. They also encounter the Scraplets while Cheetor also senses the AllSpark in the ship. The Autobots soon meet Starscream who reveals his plans to extract their sparks and mockingly suggests they may also become Scraplets as well. The Autobot team is overwhelmed by Starscream's waves of Scraplets until Cheetor engages him, stripping him of his spark armor. Finding the AllSpark on Starscream's shoulder, Cheetor taps into its powers to heal the wounded aboard the ship before Starscream escapes with the artifact, swearing vengeance on Cheetor.
27	9	"Spotted"	Jean Texier	Zac Atkinson	November 2, 2019	209	N/A
Cheetor, determined to assist the Autobots, ends up accidentally causing accidents in their activities whenever he tries to help. As such, Bumblebee offer to teach him how to be a scout. Cheetor proves to be fit for the task, but during a training session, he witnesses the Seekers attacking Bumblebee. The two try to shake off their pursuers but are eventually caught and knocked out. Starscream then reveals his plans to remove Cheetor's spark and merge it with his own to utilise the AllSpark's powers, demonstrating his scheme by hooking up Bumblebee to a Scraplet. Cheetor, however, breaks himself and Bumblebee out before both escape; a Scraplet follows the escapees only to be disabled by Cheetor.
28	10	"Secret Science"	Ehud Landsberg	Dan Salgarolo	November 9, 2019	210	N/A
Wheeljack, while testing a Scraplet specimen, crosses paths with Shockwave who captures him. Wheeljack, in captivity, also discovers Shockwave has apparently captured Bumblebee as well (though it is later revealed to be a hologram of him). Forced to comply with Shockwave, Wheeljack works on examining the Scraplet while Shockwave leaves his left hand to ensure Wheeljack complies. However, the Autobot tricks the left hand into returning his blaster before subduing and controlling it before escaping. Meanwhile, Bludgeon releases and slices a swarm of Scraplets to find a weakness in them. Windblade, who was eyeing him the whole time, suddenly attacks him to avenge Slipstream's death. While Shockwave deals with Wheeljack's escape and his own rogue left hand, Wheeljack rescues Windblade just as Bludgeon prepares to finish her off.
29	11	"Infinite Vendetta"	Jean Texier	Zac Atkinson	November 16, 2019	211	N/A
Decepticon Sky-Byte and Autobot Jetfire arrive on Earth, both intent on destroying their enemy. The two return to their respective factions where they explain to their comrades the story of their feud: after Sky-Byte triggered a destructive supernova, Jetfire pursued him through space, the two destroying countless star systems in their brawls. Both soldiers request their comrades for help in completing their battle only to be declined. They both encounter each other again and battle to a draw, the subsequent crash from the skirmish being witnessed by Thundercracker who reports it to Starscream. Starscream approaches Jetfire and Sky-Byte, equipping both with a spark armor each to defeat their opponent. After capturing Megatron and Optimus respectively, Jetfire and Sky-Byte engage each other in a perilous duel which ends with Jetfire winning the fight. However, when Megatron urges Jetfire to finish off Sky-Byte, Jetfire lets his foe escape before rescuing Optimus. The two leaders then request their respective soldiers to lead them to the AllSpark's location.
30	12	"I Am the Allspark"	Ehud Landsberg	Mae Catt	November 23, 2019	212	N/A
Starscream fuses with the AllSpark and intends to use its powers to extract the sparks of all Transformers into it, demonstrating his plans by extracting the sparks of his Seekers. Optimus Prime leads a team of Autobots to reclaim the AllSpark from Starscream, venturing into the cave where it once stood. There, they encounter the Decepticons and are about to battle them until Starscream arrives with his Scraplet swarms. The Autobots and Decepticons attempt to attack him but Starscream proves to be immune to their attacks and subdues them before attempting to extract their sparks. However, Optimus uses the power of the Matrix of Leadership to blast the AllSpark out from Starscream, ending his threat but exhausting the Autobot leader. A great battle between both Autobots and Decepticons ensues with Shockwave gaining control of the Scraplets, Cheetor reclaiming the AllSpark for the Autobots and Bumblebee bringing an unconscious Starscream as prisoner.
31	13	"Escape From Earth"	Jean Texier	Mae Catt	November 30, 2019	213	N/A
As Autobot medic Ratchet tends to Optimus, Grimlock and a team of Autobots man shuttles to carry the AllSpark to the Spacebridge above Earth and back to Cybertron. Back at the Decepticon warship Nemesis, Megatron and his troops catch wind of the Autobots' mission and attack the five Autobot shuttles, destroying all of them. The shuttle mission is revealed to be a ruse for the Ark to finally launch uninterrupted while the Decepticons are distracted finding the AllSpark. However, Sky-Byte attacks the Ark with the Nemesis following afterwards. Though Cheetor manages to repair the Ark using the AllSpark's powers, the Spacebridge is seemingly destroyed by Shockwave, causing the crew of the Ark to change plans and head into deep space to return to Cybertron. Unbeknownst to the Autobots, Shockwave only destroyed a holographic version of the Spacebridge while the Nemesis departs for Cybertron, entering the real Spacebridge to get there first.
32	14	"Party Down"	Ehud Landsberg	Andrew Robinson	December 7, 2019	214	N/A
The Autobots throw a surprise party for Optimus Prime. To celebrate, Wheeljack makes AllSpark emitter badges for the revellers to commemorate their time on Earth. However, one of the badges falls into the hands of a captive Starscream, who proceeds to sabotage it and thus all other badges. As a result, the entire crew of the Ark, except for Teletraan-X, Optimus and Cheetor, go berserk. The three survivors confront Starscream, during which, Teletraan-X snatches the badge and deduces Starscream's plans. They later confront the berserk Autobots before Optimus destroys the sabotaged emitter badge, restoring all victims from their berserk state. After the incident, Optimus resumes the party, restoring the festive mood of the Autobots.
33	15	"Wiped Out"	Jean Texier	Benjamin Townsend	December 14, 2019	215	N/A
The Ark comes across an asteroid field with Teletraan-X having to find an alternate route amidst strong solar winds. Bumblebee, Hot Rod and Cheetor, taking advantage of the solar winds, go out to surf on them and the asteroids. While having fun, the three discover strange asteroids that were actually once part of a planet. A strong solar wind separates the trio who eventually meet a group of shark-like creatures called Sharkticons whose people were separated into three groups. The Sharkticon groups, divided by territorial war, head off to confront one another, bringing the three heroes along with them. Cheetor tries to stop the fight between the three factions only for all Sharkticons to attack him and the two Autobots, forcing all three to return to the Ark. Cheetor then uses the AllSpark to restore the Sharkticons' ruined homeworld; content with the restoration, the three factions decide to call a permanent truce between them.
34	16	"Ghost Town"	Ehud Landsberg	Gavin Hignight	December 21, 2019	216	N/A
Bumblebee and Cheetor witness Windblade suddenly leave the Ark with the AllSpark in hand. Alerted to the situation, Optimus and Teletraan-X track her to a nearby planet, with Optimus leading a team of Autobots to head there. Upon arrival, the team finds Windblade at an abandoned city with Cheetor sensing that something is possessing her. The Autobot team confronts Windblade, chasing her to a chamber where the AllSpark reacts to the room. The freed Windblade reveals that the entity that possessed her, a Titan named Croaton, had come to the planet to colonize it but its population was kidnapped by an unknown force which left Croaton for dead. As such, he took advantage of the Ark's arrival to sense the AllSpark and get Windblade to retrieve it for him to aid his recovery. Croaton thanks the Autobots before heading off to find his missing colonists while Starscream, who earlier escaped captivity by tricking Teletraan-X, crashes into Croaton and ends up getting dragged off into space.
35	17	"Perfect Storm"	Jean Texier	Zac Atkinson	December 28, 2019	217	N/A
As the Ark continues its journey back to Cybertron, Grimlock and Arcee head off to see a nebula to relieve their boredom. Upon returning to the Ark, they notice that the ship and its crew were all deactivated; the ship was hit by an electromagnetic storm while they were away. The two Autobots end up leading a group of alien Air Hammers away from the Ark and blasting through an asteroid field. However, they and the ship are confronted by a massive supernova threatening to destroy them. Arcee and Grimlock ultimately agree to use the Ark's shields but argue over how to and who should activate them. Teletraan-X arrives back at the ship, having been through an adventure of his own to get back, and deploys the shields, saving everyone aboard.
36	18	"The Crossroads"	Ehud Landsberg	Randolph Heard	January 4, 2020	218	0.24
The Autobots repair a derelict Spacebridge they stumbled upon, hoping to use it to return to Cybertron quickly in response to a distress call from an Autobot, named Chromia, who remained on Cybertron. The Ark heads off into the Spacebridge only to arrive at an eerie place known as Unspace. Exploring around, the Autobots find another Ark there only for that Ark to disintegrate, an effect of being trapped in Unspace for too long. The prime Autobots are then met by another crew of Autobots also on their Ark. The two ship crews meet and make a plan to use the power of their AllSparks to escape Unspace. Though they receive assistance of another Ark crew, the plan fails. However, more Arks appear to assist and with the combined power of their AllSparks, all Autobots successfully open a portal to return to their respective Cybertrons. As the prime universe Ark approaches its prime Cybertron, the Autobots celebrate their return home, unaware that the Decepticons have beaten them there and are leading them into a trap...

=== Chapter Three: Bumblebee Cyberverse Adventures (2020) ===
No. overall	No. in season	Title	Directed by	Written by	Original release date	Prod. code	U.S. viewers (millions)
37 38 39 40	1 2 3 4	"The Battle for Cybertron"	Jean Texier	Randolph Heard	March 15, 2020 (Note: This episode was first aired In The UK on February 17, 2020.)	301 302 303 304	0.18
As the Ark returns to Cybertron, Chromia and another Autobot, Perceptor, break out of their captivity to try to warn their comrades of the Decepticons' death trap. Unfortunately, they are recaptured with Chromia being forced to watch as Shockwave destroys the Ark with his new laser snare cannon. The Decepticons revel in their apparent victory until the Autobots reveal themselves, having abandoned ship earlier. A fierce battle occurs with neither side gaining an advantage and Prowl taking a fatal shot meant for Optimus. As the battle continues, Bumblebee, Hot Rod and Cheetor head off to the Well of the AllSpark while Hot Rod deals with and defeats Drift, who reveals he faked his defection to the Autobots. Meanwhile, Wheeljack sends Vector Sigma into Unspace and Windblade engages Bludgeon in a final duel that ends with her sending the Decepticon into Unspace as well. At the Well of the AllSpark, Bumblebee and Cheetor engage Shockwave and defeat him. However, as the AllSpark is placed back into its well, Shockwave dies sending his spark into the AllSpark to corrupt it. In response, Cheetor sends his own spark into the artifact to reverse its corruption and fully revitalise Cybertron, sacrificing himself in the process. Optimus sends Megatron flying into a swarm of Scraplets, achieving complete victory for the Autobots and ending the war.
41	5	"The Loop"	Ehud Landsberg	Gavin Hignight	March 22, 2020 (Note: This episode was first aired In The UK on February 18, 2020.)	305	0.20
Both Autobots and Decepticons are stuck in a never-ending parade loop. Hot Rod, who was not caught in the loop, and Decepticon soldier Clobber, who was rescued from it by the former, attempt to hack into it to free their fellow Cybertronians. The attempt fails and both are chased by mysterious tentacled troopers with Clobber getting recaptured and needing Hot Rod's help twice. The two later lure in a squad of the tentacled troopers before crushing them under the debris of a derelict building. They later join Perceptor who reveals that the loop the other Cybertronians were currently experiencing is slowly draining their sparks. With that in mind, Hot Rod resolves to free everyone from the loop and end the invasion on their home planet.
42	6	"The Dead End"	Ehud Landsberg	Mae Catt	March 22, 2020 (Note: This episode was first aired In The UK on February 18, 2020.)	306	0.20
Clobber, hacking into the loop again, tries to warn some Cybertronians to snap out of the loop to no avail. However, another Decepticon, Dead End, breaks out of it. Exploring the actual room and that his fellow Decepticons were also caught in the loop, Dead End is forced to flee when he accidentally alerts the invaders, the Quintessons. Finding Clobber and Hot Rod at one of Shockwave's old labs, he attacks the latter, having assumed that the Autobots were responsible for bringing the Quintessons to Cybertron. Even though Hot Rod explains everything, also mentioning how he evaded capture and that he found Perceptor who freed himself from the loop much earlier, Dead End remains unconvinced until the Quintessons and their troops, the Prosecutors, find the three Cybertronians and chase them. The trio are only able to shake off their pursuers when they hide out at Maccadam's bar.
43	7	"The Sleeper"	Ehud Landsberg	Dan Salgarolo	March 29, 2020 (Note: This episode was first aired In The UK on February 18, 2020.)	307	0.19
Hot Rod hacks into the loop again in a bid to free Optimus Prime from it. Despite his efforts, he is unable to free the Autobot leader, especially when his actions are met with resistance from those enjoying the parade loop. Hot Rod is eventually caught by the Quintessons but is rescued by Clobber, who noticed Hot Rod's absence from Maccadam's bar, and Autobot comrade Whirl, who managed to break out of the loop while Hot Rod tried to rescue Optimus. Meanwhile, Perceptor examines Maccadam's bar to find out why the Quintessons did not attack them when they entered in and discovers that it is actually part of a Titan which they had been hiding in the whole time.
44	8	"The Citizen"	Ehud Landsberg	Zac Atkinson	March 29, 2020 (Note: This episode was first aired In The UK on February 18, 2020.)	308	0.19
Perceptor explains his discovery but Hot Rod states that the Titan, named Iaconus, is not active and thus unable to help them. As he, Clobber, Dead End and Whirl venture deep into Iaconus to obtain a cloaking device that shielded them from the Quintessons, the four end up in a training simulator. Perceptor meets up with the four Cybertronians again, having an arm decapitated and discovered the inner workings of Iaconus as well. The group is then attacked by a crocodile bot which they fend off. As the five approach the cloaking device, Maccadam arrives and discourages them from taking the device before explaining the history of Iaconus. Back at the surface, Hot Rod later decides to awaken Iaconus to stop the Quintessons.
45	9	"The Trial"	Jean Texier	Eugene Son	April 5, 2020 (Note: This episode was first aired In The UK on February 19, 2020.)	309	0.24
While Perceptor concludes that only a Cityspeaker can awaken Iaconus, Hot Rod leads a team to free more of their comrades from the Quintessons' parade loop. However, the Quintessons discover Hot Rod's resistance team, capturing Hot Rod in the process. Meanwhile, Whirl inadvertently frees Soundwave from the loop when he dislodges the machinery attached to him though Soundwave is currently in poor health. Hot Rod, in the meantime, is brought in front of a Quintesson Judge who explains that they travel to different universes to judge if they are worthy. The Judge deems Hot Rod guilty but Hot Rod escapes with Whirl coming to his rescue, after which, Hot Rod thanks Whirl who is then "thanked" by Soundwave.
46	10	"The Prisoner"	Ehud Landsberg	Gavin Hignight	April 5, 2020 (Note: This episode was first aired In The UK on February 19, 2020.)	310	0.24
Despite working together, both Autobots and Decepticons still do not get along with each other. Soundwave and Hot Rod argue over who should lead the Cybertronian resistance, though Soundwave still freezes up every now and then, a result of being forcefully pulled out of the loop. Even when their team heads out to combat a Quintesson squad, Hot Rod and Soundwave still have different ideas on how to lead. During the fight, Soundwave freezes again, causing the resistance to come to his rescue, during which, they also bring in a Sharkticon working for the Quintessons as their bailiff. Hot Rod later interrogates the Sharkticon bailiff who makes mention of a scientist. Hot Rod asks him where they can find that Scientist.
47	11	"The Scientist"	Jean Texier	Mae Catt	April 12, 2020 (Note: This episode was first aired In The UK on February 19, 2020.)	311	0.25
Hot Rod and Soundwave venture back to the room where the other Cybertronians are kept to confront the Quintesson Scientist. The Scientist ignores Hot Rod's threats, explaining that he was making duplicates of Soundwave from each universe. When the real Soundwave freezes up again, the Scientist fixes him, only for that Soundwave to shoot him upon being fully repaired. Hot Rod and the real Soundwave then try to free everyone from the loop only to be confronted by multiple duplicates of the Scientist. In response, Soundwave sends one of his cassette minions, Laserbeak, to help the other Cybertronians to break in and free all Autobots and Decepticons from the loop. Unfortunately, the Quintessons' tower and ship combine and generate a forcefield...
48	12	"The Alliance"	Ehud Landsberg	Dan Salgarolo	April 12, 2020 (Note: This episode was first aired In The UK on February 19, 2020.)	312	0.25
While the Quintessons continue building a new Judge by using the AllSpark's energy, Hot Rod and Soundwave try to rally the Autobots and Decepticons to work together to no avail; the two eventually agree to make them do so. As such, they make everyone train for the battle against the Quintessons and their forces. Amidst the training sessions, Hot Rod tasks Windblade to reawaken Iaconus despite Maccadam's reservations. A resistance squad led by Optimus Prime initiates an operation to carry a bomb to breach the Quintesson forcefield, but the Quintesson forces overpower the team and destroy the bomb. The enemy, however, is driven away when Windblade, attempting to awaken Iaconus again, partially does so, bringing out his arm.
49	13	"The Judge"	Jean Texier	Zac Atkinson	April 19, 2020 (Note: This episode was first aired In The UK on February 20, 2020.)	313	0.22
Jetfire, Sky-Byte and Wheeljack explain that the Quintessons possess a multiverse drive that allows them to travel to different universes. Dead End reports the finding to Megatron, who uses it to travel to another universe and bail out on the Cybertronian resistance. Meanwhile, the Cybertronian resistance lures the Quintessons and their forces to Iaconus, while they attack the Quintesson ship as the enemy charges towards the city. Despite the relentless attack from the Quintesson forces and their Scientist, the Cybertronians are able to destroy the Quintesson structure, killing the Quintesson Judge as well. The Transformers celebrate their victory, but are then confronted by the new Judge, Starscream, who declares them all guilty.
50 51 52 53	14 15 16 17	"The End of the Universe"	Ehud Landsberg	Zac Atkinson; Mae Catt; Gavin Hignight; Dan Salgarolo	April 26, 2020 (Note: This episode was first aired In The UK on February 20 and 21, 2020.)	323 324 325 326	0.22
Starscream, using his new Quintesson powers gained from his encounter with them, incapacitates the Transformers, thwarting any escape plans they initiate. While he judges some Transformers, Optimus, Bumblebee and an injured Wheeljack escape into the multiverse. Meanwhile, Windblade heads to Maccadam's, fights off the Quintesson Sharkticons and fully awakens Iaconus with assistance from Maccadam. In response, Starscream summons a brainwashed Croaton to attack Iaconus. Amidst the battle, Maccadam frees the captives before getting killed by a stray blast from Croaton. Starscream then uses Unspace to decapitate Iaconus' head and sends Croaton to destroy Iacon city. Optimus, Bumblebee and Wheeljack return from the multiverse and confront the Quintesson Scientist, with Wheeljack locating the Scientist's real body and killing it before Starscream attacks Optimus's team. As Starscream prepares to kill all Transformers, Megatron returns from the multiverse with Dead End, the newly recruited Insecticons and a Decepticon shuttle named Astrotrain to assist everyone using his newly gained multiversal powers. Windblade frees Croaton from the Quintessons' control, but the strain of the task fragments her consciousness which scatters all across Cybertron. Megatron reveals to Optimus that he obtained another Matrix of Leadership from the multiverse. Using the combined power of their Matrixes, Optimus and Megatron destroy Starscream for good. Following the battle, Megatron orders a ceasefire and that both Decepticons and Autobots will possess one half of Cybertron each.
54	18	"Enemy Line"	Jean Texier	Gavin Hignight	May 3, 2020	314	0.19
While Optimus and the other Autobots repair their half of Cybertron for inhabitation, Bumblebee sneaks into Decepticon territory to find the body of his friend, Windblade. Arriving at Croaton city, Bumblebee runs into Shadow Striker who leads him to Windblade and gives him a limited time to get out with Windblade's body before she notifies the others. However, the Autobot scout is discovered by the rest of the Decepticons. Hot Rod discovers Bumblebee's absence and Whirl is sent to rescue him. Unfortunately, Whirl and Bumblebee are overpowered by the Decepticons who then prepare to execute the two intruders. The Autobots arrive, stating that the Decepticons were violating the ceasefire by keeping Windblade prisoner. As such, Megatron reluctantly allows Whirl and Bumblebee to leave, but warns them against trespassing into Decepticon territory again. Later, Chromia approaches Ratchet and the Autobots, having an idea to help in Windblade's recovery.
55	19	"Thunderhowl"	Ehud Landsberg	Mae Catt	May 17, 2020	315	0.21
Bumblebee and Chromia, using a Camien psychic tracker to find Windblade's fragmented consciousness, track one fragment to the mystical Crystal City. Unfortunately, as the two Autobots explore the city, they are attacked by crystal duplicates of themselves. Bumblebee is forced to use his multiversal powers to defeat the copies, inadvertently freeing a robot wolf in the process. The wolf robot, Thunderhowl, explains his origins and mission to destroy Crystal City before joining forces with the two Autobots. The three Cybertronians venture deeper into the city, fighting off duplicates of themselves and Windblade before retrieving Windblade's first mind fragment from its ruler. Back home, Bumblebee and Chromia deliver their newly gained fragment to Ratchet while Thunderhowl joins the Autobots.
56	20	"Wild Wild Wheel"	Jean Texier	Dan Salgarolo	May 17, 2020	316	0.21
A hooded stranger arrives on Cybertron, searching for Optimus Prime. He first makes a stop at Maccadam's bar (now run by Perceptor), before causing chaos in Decepticon territory. The stranger then sabotages an Autobot restoration effort, gaining the attention of Optimus Prime. The stranger, WildWheel, explains to Optimus that he was one of the Autobots who fell out of the Ark back during the war and had to fight for a ride back to Cybertron. A regretful Optimus apologizes, asking Wildwheel to rejoin the Autobots, but Wildwheel terrorizes the other bystanders, shooting one of them. Enraged, Optimus engages Wildwheel in a standoff and wins. A defeated Wildwheel, however, rejects Optimus' offer to rejoin him and heads off to join the Decepticons.
57	21	"Alien Hunt! With Meteorfire and Cosmos"	Ehud Landsberg	Zac Atkinson	May 24, 2020	317	0.20
Bumblebee and Chromia track another of Windblade's mind fragments on a forbidden moon of Cybertron, Luna 3. To retrieve that shard, they enlist the help of Meteorfire, one of two hosts of the show "Alien Hunt!", whose partner, Cosmos, was abducted. The three Cybertronians arrive at Luna 3 and Bumblebee is faced with terrifying visions of past Transformers. Meteorfire later gets possessed and has Bumblebee free him from his possession with the trio finding out that a parasitic entity on Luna 3 was responsible for the two occurrences. The three fight it to no avail until Bumblebee finishes it off using his multiversal powers, freeing Cosmos trapped inside it while also reclaiming Windblade's second mind fragment. Cosmos explains that she crashed the entity into Luna 3 when it targeted Cybertron. Reunited with his co-host, Meteorfire and Cosmos resume their show.
58	22	"Journey to the Valley of Repugnus"	Jean Texier	Dan Salgarolo	May 24, 2020	318	0.20
Bumblebee and Grimlock venture into Cybertron's underworld with Grimlock detecting another of Windblade's mind fragments there. Upon arrival, the two Autobots are separated. They later learn that the residential Monsterbots, divided into two groups, have unequal shares of Energon and something is shocking them every time they try to transform. Bumblebee reunites with Grimlock and explains to the two groups that they have more similarities than they realize, also learning that one of the Monsterbots was forced to build a shock tower causing the shocks on the other Monsterbots. Bumblebee destroys the shock tower, restoring equality among the Monsterbots and allowing Bumblebee to retrieve Windblade's third mind fragment from the tower's remains.
59	23	"Rack 'n' Ruin 'n' Ratchet"	Ehud Landsberg	Mae Catt	May 31, 2020	319	0.15
Ratchet is sent out to rescue Jetfire, who was hit by an energy blast while on a mission to determine Megatron's motives since his acquisition of a Matrix. Ratchet accidentally brings a conjoined Autobot, Rack'n'Ruin, along for the rescue operation. When the two Autobots tend to Jetfire, they discover the latter's body parts keep disappearing and reappearing, an effect of a secret Decepticon weapon. Rack'n'Ruin try to help Ratchet, but Jetfire and Ratchet are kidnapped by Astrotrain, leaving the lone Autobot to rescue them. At the same time, Soundwave and Shadow Striker attempt to enter Astrotrain's secret facility and use an arriving Rack'n'Ruin to distract Astrotrain who discovers the Autobot and flings them into the weapon's control panel. Chaos ensues when the weapon Astrotrain is working on goes haywire, randomly blasting objects into Unspace. Amidst the mayhem, Ratchet is freed and heals Jetfire before escaping with his comrades, Soundwave and Shadow Striker are exposed trying to break in and a stray blast from Astrotrain's weapon sends Astrotrain into Unspace. Astrotrain returns to his facility from Unspace, gleeful that his weapon worked.
60	24	"Dweller in the Depths"	Jean Texier	Zac Atkinson	May 31, 2020	320	0.15
Bumblebee and Chromia head into the gaseous Argon Sea to reclaim the body of Windblade which a shark-bot stole from them. Bumblebee engages the shark and captures it only to fall into the ravine. The shark-bot then introduces itself to Chromia as HammerByte and explains it was possessed by a malevolent beast called the Dweller. Chromia and HammerByte then set off to rescue Windblade and Bumblebee who end up under mind-control by the Dweller which Chromia identifies as another Titan. The duo rescue the two hypnotised Autobots, reclaim Windblade's fourth mind fragment and escape from the Dweller and the Argon Sea. Meanwhile, Optimus Prime is summoned into his Matrix of Leadership and meets Maccadam, who reveals his true identity as Alchemist Prime. Alchemist instructs Optimus to destroy Megatron's Matrix, also stating that the last of Windblade's consciousness is trapped in there. Returning to the real world, Optimus rounds up a team of Autobots to assist him in his newly assigned mission.
61	25	"Silent Strike"	Jean Texier	Gavin Hignight	June 7, 2020	321	0.17
While Megatron and his army make final preparations for an imminent threat, Optimus Prime leads an Autobot strike team into Decepticon territory to destroy Megatron's Matrix of Leadership, overpowering many Decepticon troops along the way. Meanwhile, Megatron oversees the status of the dimensional shields monitored by Sky-Byte and the dimensional weapon he requested from Astrotrain before confronting the Insecticons who have bailed out on his plans. As the Autobots venture deeper into Decepticon territory, they are accidentally discovered and surrounded by the Decepticons. Optimus finds Megatron and confronts him over the latter's Matrix but the argument is interrupted when mysterious new troopers arrive and surround both Autobots and Decepticons at gunpoint.
62	26	"The Other One"	Jean Texier	Randolph Heard	June 7, 2020	322	0.17
Optimus identifies the mysterious troopers as the Perfect Decepticon supersoldiers which Megatron once dreamed of creating. Bumblebee and Megatron clarifies that they were actually made by "the Other One". While Astrotrain escapes, the Autobots and Decepticons attempt to engage the supersoldiers but are overpowered until Optimus and Megatron channel their multiversal powers to defeat them. Megatron blasts a second wave of supersoldiers into Unspace but is killed by the arriving Other One, who is revealed to be a more towering black-armored powerful ruthless and tyrannical alternate version of Megatron from an alternate universe. The Other One explains his origins and reclaims his Matrix only for Bumblebee to steal it and take it to the enhanced border with Optimus arriving shortly after to engage the foe. Within Megatron's Matrix, Windblade's last psychic shard meets the spirit of an alternate Optimus Prime who instructs her to destroy this Matrix to defeat the Other One. A shocked Windblade eventually complies and short-circuits the alternate Matrix from within, allowing her universe's Optimus to finally defeat the Other One. After Bumblebee reclaims Windblade's last mind fragment, Astrotrain arrives to take the Other One into the multiverse, intending to trap him there forever. The Autobots later celebrate Windblade's restoration.

=== Chapter Four: Bumblebee Cyberverse Adventures (2021) ===
No. overall	No. in season	Title	Directed by	Written by	Original release date	Prod. code	U.S. viewers (millions)
63	1	"The Immobilizers"	Ehud Landsberg	Zac Atkinson; Dan Salgarolo	November 22, 2021 (Note: This episode was first released online on November 6, 2021.)	402	N/A
The Autobots and Decepticons celebrate a peace treaty but are suddenly frozen. Arcee and Grimlock return from gathering Nexus Prime's artifacts, only to find everyone stuck. When they investigate the situation, Arcee is captured by a mercenary group consisting of Soundblaster, Nightbird, Bug Bite, Doublecrosser and Afterburner while Grimlock runs into a group of Dinobots (consisting of Sludge, Snarl, Swoop and Slug) who survived the destruction of their planet at the hands of the mercenaries and received his message. While trying to stop the mercenaries, the Dinobots use the Enigma of Combination, an artifact which allows robots to combine, and briefly form Volcanicus. Grimlock moves to training the Dinobots to fight as Volcanicus while Soundblaster exacts revenge on Soundwave for being rejected. Volcanicus engages and defeats the mercenaries, but their giant kaiju-like employer Trypticon arrives, fires his escaping crew and tries to recruit the Dinobots. Refusing the offer, Grimlock and the Dinobots engage Trypticon, combining into Volcanicus to freeze him with the mercenaries' discarded immobilizer gun. Afterwards, the Dinobots free Wheeljack who builds an invention to unfreeze all of Cybertron, allowing the Autobots and Decepticons to resume the festivities.
64	2	"The Perfect Decepticon"	Ehud Landsberg	Gavin Hignight; Maasai Singleton	December 22, 2021 (Note: This episode first aired in Canada on November 7, 2021 and was later released online on November 20, 2021)	401	N/A
A mortally wounded Astrotrain arrives on Cybertron, warning the Autobots and Decepticons of an incoming threat. While the Autobots and Decepticons try to stop the threat, the Perfect Decepticon supersoldiers arrive fighting one another. One of them named Tarn explains that they were mindless slaves under the deceased Other One and all of them were fighting to see who is worthy to be their new leader and suggests finding and using the Cortex Helm, a legendary relic that can reprogram his kin. Optimus agrees to help and leads him and a team to find the relic, but Tarn betrays them all, dons the Helm to control his kin and captures Optimus, while the rest are forced to retreat. Tarn forces Optimus to fight his troops when all Autobots and Decepticons enter to save Optimus, stop Tarn and his forces, and reclaim the Helm. Amidst the ensuing battle, Soundwave seizes the helm and uses it to reprogram all of the Decepticon supersoldiers with free will, but Tarn strikes back hard and retakes the helm. However, before he can wear it again, Soundwave sacrifices himself to annihilate both Tarn and the helm once and for all. After the final battle, a memorial is held for Soundwave as Cybertron enters a new age of peace. Later, Optimus expresses his belief that Cybertron no longer needs a Prime as everyone has demonstrated that they will be ready to rise against any crisis and then shares a group hug with Bumblebee, Windblade, Hot Rod, Shadow Striker and the Dinobots, concluding the series.
