= Gavin Hignight =

American screenwriter, director, toymaker

- Gavin Hignight at the Bandai Gundam Booth San Diego Comic-Con 2024
- Occupations: Film director; screenwriter; film producer; comic book writer
- Website: Official website

Gavin Hignight is an American screenwriter, producer, director, and toy creator. His television writing credits include Star Wars Resistance, Transformers: Cyberverse, Teenage Mutant Ninja Turtles, and Tekken: Bloodline. He was writer and executive producer of the 2024 Netflix animated series Mobile Suit Gundam: Requiem for Vengeance.

== Career ==
=== Television and animation ===
Hignight has written for animated television series based on established entertainment franchises, including Teenage Mutant Ninja Turtles, Iron Man: Armored Adventures, Ultimate Spider-Man, Avengers Assemble, Star Wars Resistance, and Transformers: Cyberverse. In 2022, Hignight wrote Tekken: Bloodline, an animated series based on the Tekken video game franchise.

Hignight served as writer and executive producer on Mobile Suit Gundam: Requiem for Vengeance, a six-episode series set during the One Year War in the Gundam fictional universe. The series follows soldiers from the Principality of Zeon and presents the conflict from their perspective. Hignight developed the project with producer and animation executive Taiki Sakurai and the Japanese animation teams at Sunrise and Bandai Namco Filmworks, and the series was released in 2024.

In 2024, Hignight was announced as a writer and executive producer for Biker Mice From Mars, the first animated series on Fubo TV's Maximum Effort Channel. In 2025, Hignight wrote and developed the six-episode RoboForce: The Animated Series, based on the 1980s RoboForce toy line. The series was produced by Nacelle and Seven Bucks Productions and released on Tubi.

In 2026, Hignight wrote the screenplay for Unknown Company, a horror thriller set in World War II starring Ross Marquand.

=== Toy creation ===
Hignight speaks on a panel at San Diego Comic Con in 2021

Hignight has collaborated with television writer and producer Chris "Doc" Wyatt on collectible action figures through their company Wandering Planet Toys. Their projects have included officially-licensed figures based on the television series The Prisoner, Kolchak: The Night Stalker, Laurel and Hardy, and Nancy Drew.

Hignight co-founded the company in 2021 based on his interest in collecting toys and desire to produce figures based on classic TV properties which had received limited representation in the action-figure market.

=== Comics and other writing ===
Hignight has also worked in comics and prose fiction. In 1997, he created the urban fantasy graphic novel Motor City, and returned to comics writing in 2012 with the science fiction webcomic The Concrete World. His young adult novel The Freak Table was published by Rebel Sidekick Studios in 2012.

=== Directing ===
Hignight co-directed and co-produced the music videos "Night" (2015) and "Utopian Facade" (2016) for John Carpenter. In 2026, he wrote, directed, and produced the short film Nanocell, which received its world premiere at the 2026 Chattanooga Film Festival, and is an official selection of 2026 Filmquest Film Festival and 2026 Screamfest Horror Film Festival.
