= Star Wars Resistance =

2018 animated television show by Dave Filoni

- Genre: Action; Science fiction
- Created by: Dave Filoni
- Based on: Star Wars by: George Lucas
- Developed by: Dave Filoni; Kiri Hart; Carrie Beck
- Voices of: Christopher Sean; Josh Brener; Suzie McGrath; Scott Lawrence; Justin Ridge
- Composers: Michael Tavera; (Based on themes by John Williams)
- Countries of origin: United States; Japan; Taiwan
- Original language: English
- No. of seasons: 2
- No. of episodes: 40

Production
- Executive producers: Dave Filoni; Athena Portillo; Justin Ridge; Brandon Auman
- Running time: 22 minutes
- Production companies: Lucasfilm; Lucasfilm Animation; Polygon Pictures; CGCG Inc.

Original release
- Network: Disney Channel; Disney XD
- Release: October 7, 2018 – January 26, 2020

Star Wars Resistance is an American 3D animated science fiction television series produced by Lucasfilm Animation. It follows Kazuda Xiono, a New Republic pilot who is recruited by the Resistance to spy on the growing threat of the First Order shortly before and during the events of the sequel trilogy.

The series premiered on Disney Channel on October 7, 2018, and the next day it debuted on Disney XD in the United States and worldwide. Twelve shorts debuted on the Disney Channel YouTube channel in December 2018. The second and final season premiered on October 6, 2019 on Disney Channel, Disney XD and DisneyNow. The series ended on January 26, 2020 after forty episodes.

Resistance received generally positive reviews from critics. The series was nominated for the Primetime Emmy Award for Outstanding Children's Program for both of its seasons. It won the Saturn Award for Best Animated Series on Television in 2019 for its debut season.

== Cast and characters ==
=== Main ===
- Christopher Sean as Kazuda "Kaz" Xiono, a young pilot for the New Republic who becomes a resistance spy onboard the Colossus.
- Josh Brener as Neeku Vozo, a talented Nikto technician.
- Scott Lawrence as Jarek Yeager, the owner of Yeager's Repairs onboard the Colossus
- Suzie McGrath as Tamara "Tam" Ryvora, a mechanic and aspiring pilot.
- Justin Ridge as R1-J5, an old astromech droid better known as "Bucket".

=== Recurring ===
- Donald Faison as Hype Fazon, leader of the Ace Squadron that protects the Colossus.
- Myrna Velasco as Torra Doza, one of the Ace Squadron pilots and the daughter of Captain Doza.
- Jason Hightower as Captain Imanuel Doza, the captain of the Colossus.
- Nazneen Contractor as Synara San, a member of the space pirate gang known as the Warbirds.
- Liam McIntyre as Commander Pyre, a high-ranking officer in the First Order.
- Sumalee Montano as Agent Tierny, an agent in the First Order Security Bureau.
- Oscar Isaac as Poe Dameron, Kaz's friend and a commander in the resistance.
- Bobby Moynihan and Jim Rash as Orka and Flix, respectively, the Chadra-Fan and Gozzo who run the Office of Acquisitions onboard the Colossus.
- Tovah Feldshuh as Aunt Z, the Gilliand proprietor of Aunt Z's Tavern.
- Mary Elizabeth McGlynn as Freya Fenris, one of the pilots of the Ace Squadron, and 4D-M1N, the command bridge droid who assists Captain Doza.
- Stephen Stanton and Dave Filoni as Griff Halloran and Bo Keevil, the other two members of the Ace Squadron.
- Elijah Wood as Jace Rucklin, a resident of the Colossus
- Gary Anthony Williams as Captain Kragan Gorr, the Quarren captain of the Warbird pirate gang
- David Shaughnessy as Drell, a Weequay member of the Warbirds.
- Lex Lang and Christine Dunford as Major Elrik Vonreg and Lt. Galek, officers in the First Order.
- Antony Del Rio and Nikki SooHoo as Kel and Eila, a brother and sister who are stowaways on the Colussus.
- Tasia Valenza as Venisa Doza, a resistance pilot and the wife of Captain Doza.

The other residents of the Colossus are voiced by a group of recurring voice actors. Greg Proops, who had also voiced the race commentator Fode in Episode I – The Phantom Menace, voices race commentator Jak Sivrak as well as Garma, an elderly Arcona. Fred Tatasciore voices the Klatooinian gorg seller Bolza Grool and Dee Bradley Baker voices both Grevel, an irascible Aleena, and Glem, a Rodian dockworker. Jooks, a Theelin who lives on the Colossus is also voiced by Mary Elizabeth McGlynn.

The droid BB-8 appears for most of the first season.

=== Guest ===
- Gwendoline Christie (season 1) and Ellen Dubin (season 2) as Captain Phasma, a high-ranking officer in the First Order
- Domhnall Gleeson (Note: Archived voice from Star Wars: The Force Awakens.) (season 1) and Ben Prendergast (season 2) as General Hux, one of the highest-ranking officers in the First Order
- Anthony Daniels as C-3PO, a protocol droid working for the resistance. C-3PO's voice can be briefly heard over the intercom in the pilot episode.
- Carolyn Hennesy as Princess Leia Organa, the leading general of the resistance
- Tzi Ma as Senator Hamato Xiono, Kazuda's father and senator of the New Republic.
- Frank Welker as the Chelidae, the shellfolk who are the engineers onboard the Colossus
- Matthew Wood as Ello Asty, a resistance pilot, and Kylo Ren, the Supreme Leader of the First Order
- Joe Manganiello as Ax Tagrin, an Iktotchi bounty hunter
- Lucy Lawless as the Queen of the Aeosians
- John DiMaggio as Vranki the Blue, a Hutt operating a casino
- Sam Witwer and Cherami Leigh as Hugh Sion and Mia Gabon, pilots for the New Republic and friends of Kazuda's
- Rachael MacFarlane as Lin Gaava, a friend of Jace Rucklin's
- Tudi Roche as Mika Grey, a Sith relic hunter
- Daveed Diggs as Norath Kev, a resistance pilot
- Steve Blum as Leoz, a Nikto pirate

== Episodes ==
Season	Episodes	Originally released	
Season	Episodes	First released	Last released
1	11	October 7, 2018	December 9, 2018
1	Shorts	December 10, 2018	December 31, 2018
1	10	January 13, 2019	March 17, 2019
2	19	October 6, 2019	January 26, 2020

=== Season 1 (2018–19) ===
The series follows Kazuda Xiono, a New Republic pilot who is recruited by the Resistance to spy on the growing threat of the First Order. The first season begins six months before The Force Awakens and crosses over with it at the end of the 17th episode.

No. overall	No. in season	Title	Directed by	Written by	Original release date	Prod. code (Note: The shorts released during this season take up the production slot of #113.)	U.S. viewers (millions)
1	1	"The Recruit"	Steward Lee	Story by : Dave Filoni; Teleplay by : Brandon Auman	October 7, 2018	101	0.33
2	2	"The Recruit"	Saul Ruiz	Story by : Dave Filoni; Teleplay by : Brandon Auman	October 7, 2018	102	0.33
Young New Republic pilot Kazuda Xiono is recruited into the Resistance by Commander Poe Dameron, who brings Kaz to the Colossus, an aircraft refueling station on the ocean planet Castilon. Kaz's mission is to get to know everyone at this haven for the galaxy's best pilots, and learn who is working with the First Order. After a misunderstanding paints Kaz as the self-declared "best pilot in the known galaxy", he must compete in a dangerous race to prove himself. Poe's associate Jarek Yaeger lends Kaz a ship in need of repairs, The Fireball, which irks mechanic Tam Ryvora. Kaz chooses young pilot Torra Doza as his opponent, soon learning that she is undefeated. Kaz runs a good race, but crashes when he pushes The Fireball too hard.
3	3	"The Triple Dark"	Sergio Paez	Kevin Burke and Chris "Doc" Wyatt	October 14, 2018 (Note: These episodes first premiered on Disney's streaming service DisneyNow on October 7, 2018.)	103	0.47
While Kaz struggles to maintain his cover as a mechanic on the Colossus, Yeager's shop receives a new customer in the form of the Neimoidian Hallion Nark, who wants the repairs to his ship to be completed before the next "triple dark", a storm that causes low visibility on Castilon. Besides juggling his work as a mechanic and spy, Kaz also has to contend with the Aleena Grevel over debts accumulated during a game of holodarts. The Quarren pirate Kragan Gorr and his gang attack the Colossus during a "triple dark" storm. Kaz manages to drive away the pirates by using a comlink to beam a jammer into their communications systems. At the exposition, it is revealed that Kragan and his pirates are proxies serving the First Order, which hope to use the chaos to establish a foothold at Colossus.
4	4	"Fuel for the Fire"	Bosco Ng	Eugene Son	October 21, 2018	104	0.39
Still struggling to fit in as a mechanic at Yeager's repair shop, Kaz is befriended by the young racer Jace Rucklin and his associates. Having gained Kaz's trust after staging a rescue during a swoop bike ocean race, Rucklin convinces Kaz to let him visit Yeager's trophy room under the pretext of seeing Yeager's racer. Rucklin steals a bottle of Corellian hyperfuel for his racer. Upon learning of the theft and the volatile nature of hyperfuel, Kaz saves Rucklin's life but earns the enmity of the young racer and his friends, who swear revenge. Despite his unsatisfactory performance, Yeager gives Kaz a second chance because he views him as a good person who saved Rucklin from himself.
5	5	"The High Tower"	Steward Lee	Stephany Folsom	October 28, 2018	105	0.38
Captain Doza's fuel rationing forces Kaz and the rest of Yeager's team down to Aunt Z's cafe, where Kaz meets Hype Fazon. Hype reveals that the First Order is bringing fuel to Colossus, and Kaz runs outside to watch the First Order's ship as it comes in. Hype then invites Tam, Kaz and BB-8 to visit the High Tower, and Kaz excitedly agrees, hoping to find out what the First Order is doing on the platform. Using a comm link, he is able to listen in to Major Vonreg's meeting with Doza and discovers the First Order is offering protection from the pirates in exchange for control of the station, however as he leaves Vonreg discovers Kaz's actions. After a daring chase—and an encounter with Doza's daughter—Torra, Kaz eventually ends up back at Yeager's shop, but not before Doza begins to suspect him as the spy.
6	6	"The Children from Tehar"	Saul Ruiz	Paul Giacoppo	November 4, 2018	106	0.41
Kaz damages Tam's acceleration compensator, and promises to replace it although he is short on credits. At Aunt Z's, Kaz hears about a 20,000 credit bounty on two runaway children, which could solve his money issues. Kaz runs into the children, Kel and Eila, at the market, but they escape. Neeku introduces Kaz to the platform's engineers, the "shellfolk" Chelidae, who promise to look out for Kel and Eila. Kaz is summoned by Doza, who questions him about the children. Once Kaz leaves, Doza contacts Captain Phasma of the First Order, who sends troops to retrieve the fugitives. Out of sight of the troops, two Chelidae take the children's place and jump into the water. By slowing their life signs, the two Chelidae fake the troopers into believing that the children have drowned. Kaz passes on intelligence to the Resistance about Kylo Ren and the First Order wiping out Kel and Eila's village on Tehar in the Unknown Regions.
7	7	"Signal from Sector Six"	Sergio Paez	Brandon Auman	November 11, 2018	107	0.41
With the approval of Yeager, Kaz takes leave on a starfighter training exercise with Poe. During the training exercise, the two receive a distress signal from a damaged ship, which had been attacked by pirates. While searching the ship for survivors, Kaz and Poe along with their droids BB-8 and CB-23 are attacked by several Kowakian monkey-lizards and a large Kowakian ape-lizard, the cousin of the smaller creatures. The two Resistance pilots also rescue a Mirialan crew member named Synara San, whom they bring back to the Colossus with the reluctant permission of Yeager. Unknown to the others, Synara is part of Kragan Gorr's pirate gang and becomes their undercover operative on the Colossus.
8	8	"Synara's Score"	Bosco Ng	Gavin Hignight	November 18, 2018	108	0.54
Captain Doza hires Yeager's Team Fireball to repair the turbolaser system's tracking computer. The repairs are complicated by a rare missing military grade computer chip. With the help of Synara who has found work as a scavenger, Kaz and Tam managed to obtain the computer chip from a sunken starship. As a result, the two come to trust Synara. In secret, Synara informs Kragan Gorr that Ace Squadron is away and the Colossus' turbolaser defense systems are down. During the pirate attack, Kaz and Yeager fight with pirates while reinstalling the tracking computer. Meanwhile, Tam and BB-8 rush into the loading docks to rescue Synara. Team Fireball managed to drive the pirates away but the second raid leads Captain Doza to seek protection from the First Order.
9	9	"The Platform Classic"	Steward Lee	Kevin Burke and Chris "Doc" Wyatt	November 25, 2018	109	0.33
In an attempt to boost the Colossus' economy, Captain Doza invites Yeager's estranged younger brother and renowned racer Marcus Speedstar to the Platform Classic. Still bitter at Speedstar for causing the deaths of his wife and daughter during a racing accident ten years ago, Yeager refuses to speak with Speedstar. Despite the high life, Speedstar struggles with paying his debts to the Guavian Death Gang, who kidnap his mechanic Oplock. Yeager's attempt to force Speedstar to pull out of the race backfires and Yeager is compelled to participate in the Platform Classic. At the urging of both Speedstar and Kaz, Yeager decides to forgive his younger brother and allows Speedstar to win the race. After paying Speedstar's debts to the Guavians and freeing Oplock, the two brothers reconcile before parting ways.
10	10	"Secrets and Holograms"	Saul Ruiz	Stephany Folsom	December 2, 2018	110	0.38
Tired of being cooped up inside the luxurious Doza Tower, Captain Doza's daughter Torra Doza sneaks out of the tower. She encounters Kaz and BB-8, who are seeking information on Captain Doza's connections with the First Order. In the marketplace, Torra encounters growing public dissatisfaction with her father's leadership of the Colossus. While the First Order's emissary Commander Pyre negotiates an agreement with Captain Doza, Kaz befriends Torra Doza over a flight simulator game. Kaz manages to download a copy of Captain Doza's agreement but is spotted by Rucklin, who still bears a grudge against him for the loss of his racer. Kaz manages to hide from Captain Doza and Rucklin inside a closet (although Rucklin almost finds Kaz before he is stopped by Doza), but discovers Doza's Imperial uniform, confirming that he once served the Galactic Empire. Torra helps Kaz to escape but the two narrowly avoid being incinerated in a trash incinerator. Following the misadventure, Torra grows curious about Kaz's true identity.
11	11	"Station Theta Black"	Sergio Paez	Brandon Auman	December 9, 2018	111	0.38
Kaz borrows the Fireball in order to rendezvous with Poe and the Resistance. However, Tam had not finished installing the stabilizer and Kaz loses control of the ship. He is rescued by a Resistance CR90 corvette. General Organa assigns Poe and Kaz to scout a possible First Order flight path. Traveling to the coordinates, they discover Station Theta Black, a First Order asteroid mining facility. Their presence attracts the attention of Captain Phasma and Major Vonreg, who lead a contingent to destroy the station, wiping out evidence of is existence. Following a pursuit, Kaz and Poe managed to escape the doomed station. Back at base, Kaz, Poe and Leia agree that a war is looming.
12	12	"Bibo"	Bosco Ng	Paul Giacoppo	January 13, 2019	112	0.47
While visiting the Colossus loading docks, Neeku befriends and adopts a slimy sea creature called Bibo. Neeku's new pet causes tension with the rest of Team Fireball including his employer Yeager. Bibo runs away and Neeku enlists Tam's help in finding his pet. They find Bibo in the safe hands of Kel and Eila but Eila warns that "something" is coming for Bibo. Meanwhile, Synara takes Kaz on a salvaging expedition in an attempt to probe into his past. However, a large sea monster besieges the platform. Synara and Kaz lock down the platform while Doza deploys the Ace Squadron to fight off the sea monster. At Tam's urging, Neeku surrenders Bibo to the creature, which turns out to be Bibo's mother.
13	13	"Dangerous Business"	Saul Ruiz	Eugene Son	January 20, 2019	114	0.34
As Kaz's mechanical skills improve, he secures a part-time job manning Orka and Flix's Acquisitions shop while they are away visiting family. Kaz also has to babysit the duo's pet Gorg Bitey, who has a propensity for biting. An alien customer named Teroj Kee visits the Acquisitions shop, seeking a phase connector. Teroj lures Kaz into a trap inside a cargo container and attempts to throw into the sea. After stealing the phase connector, Teroj departs aboard a freighter with First Order stormtroopers. Kaz escapes the container and sabotages the freighter by getting Bitey to damage a power box, causing it to crash into the ocean and denying Teroj and his First Order handlers access to the phase connector. Kaz, Teroj and the stormtroopers escape the freighter using escape pods.
14	14	"The Doza Dilemma"	Sergio Paez	Gavin Hignight	January 27, 2019	115	0.35
Under orders from Commander Pyre, Kragan and his pirate gang Warbirds embark on a plot to kidnap Captain Doza's daughter Torra in order to force Captain Doza to accept First Order protection over the Colossus. Kragan's spy Synara is tasked with helping the pirate infiltrators Drell and Valik infiltrate Doza Tower. Having grown attached to Kaz and his friends, Synara becomes disillusioned with being a pirate. Drell and Valik managed to kidnap Torra and deliver her to Kragan's barge. First Order forces led by Major Vonreg rescue Torra (betraying the pirates in the process) and return her to Captain Doza, who is under more pressure to accept First Order protection. Meanwhile, Kaz becomes suspicious of Synara while Kragan's Warbirds sever ties with the First Order.
15	15	"The First Order Occupation"	Bosco Ng	Kevin Burke and Chris "Doc" Wyatt	February 3, 2019	116	0.31
Following the kidnapping attempt against Torra, her father Captain Doza allows First Order stormtroopers to patrol the Colossus. Yeager advises Kaz to keep a low profile. After stormtroopers visit Yeager's repairs to question Kaz about Synara, Kaz decides to help her escape the Colossus despite knowing her true identity as a pirate. Despite being pursued by stormtroopers, Kaz manages to help Synara escape in an underwater escape pod. Synara reunites with Kragan's pirate gang, but her friendship with Kaz and Tam leads her to question her loyalty to Kragan.
16	16	"The New Trooper"	Steward Lee	Paul Giacoppo	February 10, 2019	117	0.42
Kel and Elia seek out Kaz's aid involving a stormtrooper they knocked out. To avoid the stormtrooper being missed, Kaz takes his armor and infiltrates the First Order, learning that First Order is plotting a full-scale takeover of the Colossus. He manages to escape with a data rod from Commander Pyre's shuttle and return his armor to its owner before the stormtroopers can catch him. Upon returning to Yeager, they discover that the First Order is amassing a large fleet and intend to use the Colossus as a resupply station.
17	17	"The Core Problem"	Saul Ruiz	Kevin Burke and Chris "Doc" Wyatt	February 17, 2019	118	0.38
Kaz accompanies Poe on a mission to investigate First Order activity in the Dassal system within the Unknown Regions. Traveling there, they discover that the system's sun has vanished, several wrecked planetoids, and that the planet Najra-Va has been drilled through. Kaz and Poe encounter a First Order probe droid on an abandoned moon, whose population has been wiped out by the First Order. After escaping First Order TIE fighters, Kaz and Poe part company with BB-8 accompanying Poe on a mission to Jakku. Returning with the astromech droid CB-23, Kaz's frequent trips offworld start to draw Tam's suspicion.
18	18	"The Disappeared"	Sergio Paez	Steven Melching	February 24, 2019	119	0.49
As the First Order tightens its grip on the Colossus, racing is banned. Several outspoken Colossus residents including Ace Squadron leader Hype Fazon (who dislikes the fact that racing is no longer allowed) and Aunt Z mysteriously disappear. Kaz helps his friend Torra to investigate Hype's disappearance. Meanwhile, Yeager and Captain Doza join forces to send a message to Resistance. Kaz and Torra discover that Hype, Aunt Z and two other alien residents are being imprisoned in the West's docks. They free the prisoners and help them escape offworld to find help. Returning to Yeager's shop, Kaz and Team Fireball are arrested by Commander Pyre.
19	19	"Descent"	Bosco Ng	Paul Giacoppo	March 3, 2019	120	0.34
With the help of the Chelidae, Kaz and his friends managed to escape Commander Pyre and flee into the Colossus' underlevels. Believing the situation to be a misunderstanding, Tam surrenders herself to the First Order. First Order Security Bureau Agent Tierny gains her trust by revealing Kaz's true identity as a Resistance spy, while deceiving her by saying that the First Order are peacekeepers. Kaz and the others reunite with Kel, Eila and the Chelidae in the engineering deck. Kaz comes up with a plan to take out the First Order's communications jammer by sinking the station. With Captain Doza's help, Kaz's plan works, but Tierny becomes suspicious upon noticing that only Doza Tower is still above water. Kaz, Yeager and CB-23 swim up to Doza Tower and disable the jammer long enough for Kaz to send a message to the Resistance. Yeager allows himself to be captured so Kaz can escape. Returning to the engineering deck, Kaz and the others receive General Organa's apologies that the Resistance is unable to aid them. Kragan and the pirates intercept Kaz's message, drawing Synara's attention.
20	20	"No Escape"	Steward Lee	Brandon Auman	March 10, 2019	121	0.36
21	21	"No Escape"	Saul Ruiz	Brandon Auman	March 17, 2019	122	0.36
When Captain Doza protests Yeager's imprisonment, Pyre decides he had exhausted his usefulness and has him and the Aces arrested. 4D, Doza's droid helper, tries to help Doza but is destroyed by Pyre. Meanwhile, Kaz, Neeku, Kel and Elia capture the platform control center so Kaz and CB-23 can infiltrate the detention cells. They soon discover a hyperdrive above their heads and realize the Colossus is a starship and start preparing for liftoff. At the same time, Agent Tierny manipulates Tam's resentment towards Kaz to motivate her into joining the First Order and reveals that Yeager knew who Kaz really is all this time. This is further supported when Tam lashes out at a captured Yeager for hiding Kaz's true identity this entire time. Kaz runs into Torra, who agrees to lead him to the cells. At one point, they are caught by a First Order astromech droid, who almost gives away their location before it is stopped by CB-23. They soon eavesdrop on a group of stormtroopers viewing a transmission from General Hux, proclaiming the end of the New Republic. Kaz can only watch in horror as Starkiller Base destroys his home of Hosnian Prime and his parents along with it. While Kaz and Torra rescue Yeager and Doza, the First Order decides to leave the planet immediately. Neeku flushes the stormtroopers out through the submerged portions of the Colossus. Yeager and Kaz cut off Tierny, Pyre and Tam at the First Order shuttle, but are cornered by the remaining stormtroopers. They attempt to reason with Tam, but she chooses to side with the First Order, as she is upset with them for lying to her. As Neeku gets the Colossus airborne, Doza frees the Aces and send them out to defend the ship from the First Order's TIE fighters. Aunt Z and Hype Fazon return to help, along with the pirates, and they take out the TIE fighters. Yeager is nearly shot down by Major Vonreg, but Kaz shoots Vonreg down first—as a Star Destroyer shows up. Everyone retreats to the hangar, and the Colossus jumps into hyperspace to meet the Resistance on D'Qar. Neeku reveals that he failed to enter the coordinates to D'Qar before jumping, so the crew has no way of knowing where they will end up.

=== Shorts (2018) ===
A series of shorts, depicting the lives of the Resistance cast, were released during a midseason break for the first season in 2018.

No.	Title	Directed by	Written by	Original release date
1	"The Search for Kaz"	Steward Lee	Unknown	December 10, 2018
2	"Dart and Cover"	Unknown	Unknown	December 10, 2018
3	"Neeku's Reward"	Steward Lee	Unknown	December 10, 2018
4	"When Thieves Drop By"	Steward Lee	Unknown	December 17, 2018
5	"Treasure Chest"	Steward Lee	Unknown	December 17, 2018
6	"G-LN"	Unknown	Unknown	December 17, 2018
7	"Bucket's Quest"	Steward Lee	Unknown	December 23, 2018
8	"Unmotivated"	Unknown	Unknown	December 24, 2018
9	"The Need for Speed"	Steward Lee	Unknown	December 24, 2018
10	"Sixty Seconds to Destruction"	Steward Lee	Unknown	December 31, 2018
11	"Buggles' Day Out"	Steward Lee	Unknown	December 31, 2018
12	"The Rematch"	Unknown	Unknown	December 31, 2018

=== Season 2 (2019–20) ===
The second and final season picks up immediately afterwards, crossing over with The Last Jedi and leading up to The Rise of Skywalker.

No. overall	No. in season	Title	Directed by	Written by	Original release date	Prod. code	U.S. viewers (millions)
22	1	"Into the Unknown"	Brad Rau	Steven Melching	October 6, 2019	201	N/A
The Colossus comes out of hyperspace in an unknown region. In the lower decks of the Colossus, Kazuda and his friends work to restore the station's artificial gravity, and have to stop the stowed-away First Order astromech droid from sending a beacon to its comrades in the Castilon system. Aboard a Star Destroyer, Tam pledges her loyalty to the First Order in the wake of Kazuda's apparent betrayal—even if it means revealing the location of the Colossus. Kazuda sends her a message, hoping to apologize, but Tam cuts the transmission short and dons her TIE pilot helmet.
23	2	"A Quick Salvage Run"	Bosco Ng	Brandon Auman	October 13, 2019	202	N/A
Tam listens to Kazuda's transmission, and is overheard by Rucklin, now also a First Order cadet pilot. He forces Tam to share the communication with Agent Tierny. The Colossus arrives at D'Qar to find that the Resistance base has been destroyed, but their supply of coaxium has been depleted—making it impossible to make another jump to hyperspace. Kaz suggests salvaging some from the remains of a First Order Dreadnought, which he does with the help of the pirates. The First Order arrives and the Aces defend the away team as Neeku transfers the unstable coaxium to the Colossus, with its shields failing just before they are able to make the jump to hyperspace.
24	3	"Live Fire"	Steward Lee	Mairghread Scott	October 20, 2019	203	0.11
Yeager trains the Aces, enlisting Kazuda to help based on his experience flying for the Resistance. Hype is reluctant to help Kaz or the Resistance, but Torra convinces him to help in order to defend the station. As they train over the planet's surface below, they are attacked by a manta ray-like monster which looms over Hype. The flyers cooperate to thwart the beast, and back on the Colossus, Hype warmly welcomes Kaz into the Aces. Meanwhile, Tam trains as a TIE fighter pilot and saves Rucklin after accidentally disabling his controls during an exercise; however, her actions do not please the First Order.
25	4	"Hunt On Celsor 3"	Brad Rau	Sharon Flynn	October 27, 2019	204	N/A
The crew of the Colossus is running low on supplies, prompting the pirates to hunt the manta ray-like jakoosk on the planet, Celsor 3. Kaz and Torra independently join the hunt, but the beast is immune to their fire. Two of the pirates are knocked to the surface, forcing Kragan and Synara to retreat in their sail barge. Later, Kaz and Torra return to the cold planet and land in an attempt to fire on the jakoosk from below. Their plans are complicated by Torra's unruly pet Buggles joining them and the marooned pirates stealing their fighters to escape. However, Kaz is successful in taking down the jakoosk, and the Colossus retrieves them and celebrates with a feast.
26	5	"The Engineer"	Bosco Ng	Sarah Carbiener & Erica Rosbe	November 3, 2019	205	N/A
Kaz and Synara rescue a Nikto engineer named Nena, who helps repair the Colossus while befriending Neeku and expressing her hatred towards the pirates. However, they later discover that Nena is an agent working for the First Order to sabotage the Colossus and reveal its location as Pyre's Star Destroyer attacks. As Nena flees into hyperspace, Kaz and Neeku (who is upset after learning the truth about Nena) manage to undo her sabotage, allowing the Colossus to escape. Disappointed with Nena's failure, Agent Tierny orders Pyre to execute Nena should they ever meet her again.
27	6	"From Beneath"	Steward Lee	Kevin Burke & Chris "Doc" Wyatt	November 10, 2019	206	N/A
Short on fuel, Kaz, Torra Doza, CB-23, Flix and Orka travel to Flix's homeworld of Drahgor III, a stormy world with deep mines containing fuel. Flix receives an icy reception from his estranged cousins, particularly Flanx. In returning for helping to repair a broken drill, Flanx agrees to supply the offworlders with fuel. Their mission goes awry when the lift malfunctions. While Torra and Orka climb back to the surface, the others are attacked by a large Karnex dragon, which captures Flanx. They rescue Flanx, but are attacked by more dragons. With the help of Torra and Orka, they manage to drive the dragons away and seal the entrance to their caves. Flix reconciles with Flanx, who gives the offworlders fuel. Realizing that they were encroaching on the dragons' habitat, Flanx ends deep-core drilling.
28	7	"The Relic Raiders"	Brad Rau	Brandon Auman	November 17, 2019	207	N/A
Kaz, Torra, Freya, CB-23, Kel and Eila travel to a trading outpost on the forested planet of Ashas Ree to gather supplies. However, they find that the settlement has been abandoned due to the excavation of an ancient Sith temple. While exploring the Sith temple, Kaz is trapped in a chamber with an archaeologist named Mika Grey, who wants to prevent the First Order from getting hold of a Sith relic. Working with Kel, Eila and CB-23, they manage to escape a giant grinding machine. After Mika obtains the relic, the group discover that First Order raiders led by Raith have captured Torra and Freya. Though the First Order captures Kaz, Kel, Eila and CB-23, Mika throws the Sith relic, unleashing a powerful wave of energy that vaporizes the First Order raiders, destroying the relic but denying it to the First Order. Mika agrees to accompany Kaz and his party back to the Colossus, striking a friendship with the Force-sensitive Eila.
29	8	"Rendezvous Point"	Bosco Ng	Jennifer Corbett	November 24, 2019	208	N/A
Captain Doza uses a signal beacon to contact his wife Resistance pilot Venise Doza for their annual reunion. However, this draws the attention of the First Order. Following a dogfight, the Colossus is forced to retreat into hyperspace. Venise arrives and is captured by Agent Tierny. While in captivity, she meets Tam and tries to convince her to leave the First Order. While Tam is still unwilling to leave due to her still being oblivious of the First Order's true nature, she comes to respect her adversary and question her commitment to the First Order. Venise escapes her cell with the help of her astromech droid Torch and escapes the First Order Star Destroyer, but not before skirmishing with stormtroopers and destroying several TIEs to distract Tierny, with Tam willingly allowing her to escape. While Torra is upset at not being able to rendezvous with her mother, she decides not to risk drawing First Order attention. To cheer her up, Kaz and the Ace pilots make her a jelly cake. Torra and Captain Doza spend family time together and reflect on Venise's contribution to the Resistance cause.
30	9	"The Voxx Vortex 5000"	Steward Lee	Gavin Hignight	December 1, 2019	209	N/A
With the Colossus running low on money, Hype convinces Captain Doza to allow the Aces to race with his former employer Vranki, a Hutt who owns a hotel and casino in the Voxx Cluster, in order to win money from him. However, the unscrupulous Hutt cheats Hype in a rigged race with his racer droids, forcing Hype to work for him, and prevents the others from leaving unless they allow Hype to stay. Captain Doza is forced to send his Ace pilots to compete with Vranki's racer droids in the Voxx Vortex 5000 in an attempt to win Hype back. The Hutt uses a series of dirty tactics to beat the Ace competitors, leaving only Torra and Kaz. With the help of Neeku, who has figured out that Vranki is using algorithms, Kaz and Torra race against Vranki's racer droids. At the advice of Kaz, Doza convinces Vranki to wager 500,000 credits with the promise of getting the Colossus if he wins. But if they win, all the pilots are to be freed and they also get to keep the 500,000 credits. Though Torra loses, Kaz manages to beat Vranki's droids with Neeku's help despite being hindered by Vranki's goons. A humbled Vranki is forced to release the indentured Aces and give them the prize money, allowing them to leave. Hype refuses to work with his former employer again.
31	10	"Kaz's Curse"	Brad Rau	Eugene Son	December 8, 2019	210	N/A
While playing a betting game with the Warbird pirates, Kaz is cursed by the Nikto pirate Leoz, who is jealous of Kaz's success. A series of accidents aboard the Colossus afflict Kaz, leading Neeku to believe that he is cursed, which Kaz refuses to believe. Kaz's problems are complicated by the Colossus traveling through an asteroid field in Guavian Death Gang space. After failing to stop a Guavian ship from reporting their presence, Kaz visits the archaeologist and spiritualist Mika Grey, who gives him a good luck charm. A Guavian fleet attacks the Colossus and demands that they pay a 1 million credit toll fee or surrender the Colossus, with the intention of turning them all over to the First Order. Rejecting their demands, Captain Doza sends the Aces into action. Despite leaving his lucky charm behind, Kaz manages to shoot down several Guavian ships and convinces the other Aces to lead the Guavians through the asteroid field. After escaping, Kaz realizes that he wasn't cursed and settles scores with the superstitious Leoz.
32	11	"Station to Station"	Bosco Ng	Mark Henry	December 15, 2019	211	N/A
Due to their familiarity with the Colossus, First Order TIE cadets Tam and Rucklin are assigned on a supply mission to the Titan, a similar refueling platform controlled by the First Order. Their visit coincides with a mission by Kaz, Neeku and CB-23 to steal a replacement trans-binary deflector for the Colossus. General Hux also attends a meeting of senior First Order officers to discuss counterinsurgency operations against the Resistance. Kaz and Neeku manage to reach the hyperdrive chamber where the deflector is stored but are trapped by a vengeful Rucklin, who alerts the First Order while showing no regards for the duo. A reluctant Tam secretly helps Kaz's team escape the hyperdrive chamber. After a brief skirmish with First Order forces and astromech droids in the hangar, Kaz's team escape on a getaway shuttle. A furious Hux orders Pyre to destroy the Colossus. Following the heist, Commander Pyre and Agent Tierny plan to use Tam (having been aware of her actions) to locate and destroy the Colossus. While leaving the Titan, Rucklin expresses his enjoyment with working for the First Order to Tam, unaware of Kaz, Neeku and CB-23's escape.: This is the last episode to air before the release of The Rise of Skywalker.
33	12	"The Missing Agent"	Steward Lee	Brandon Auman	December 22, 2019	212	N/A
The Resistance operative Norath Kev is captured by the Iktotchi bounty hunter Ax Tagrin but not before sending a distress signal. Kaz, Yeager, CB-23 and Synara travel to the Varkana system to rescue him. They are betrayed by the collaborationist Gran vendor Lechee, who alerts Ax. After questioning Lechee, Kaz and his team learn that Ax is holding Norath in his starship. Kaz, Yeager and CB-23 find Norath only to be trapped aboard Ax's starship. Norath reveals that he has been monitoring First Order black market activities and has been compiling a list of local collaborators. Kaz and company manage to sabotage Ax's engines, causing the ship to crash. Yeager and Synara fight with Ax, allowing Kaz and Norath to escape. First Order forces under Commander Pyre enter the Varkana system, complicating the Colossus Resistance's predicament.
34	13	"Breakout"	Brad Rau	Steven Melching	December 29, 2019	213	N/A
Ax Tagrin delivers Yeager, Synara and CB-23 into the custody of Commander Pyre and Agent Tierny, who interrogate them about the location of the Colossus and the Resistance spies Kaz and Norath. Pyre refuses to pay Tagrin until he captures Kaz and Norath. Following a conflict with stormtroopers and a frightened but unfriendly Gabdorin merchant (who didn't want to get involved in the situation), Kaz comes up with an improvised plan to infiltrate the First Order camp by disguising himself and Norath as stormtroopers. Captain Doza is forced to take the Colossus into hiding after Tagrin and the First Order discover their location. Kaz and Norath manage to rescue Yeager and Synara with the help of CB-23, who has freed herself. After subduing Pyre, Tierny and Tagrin, they escape aboard their shuttle. Despite being pursued by TIEs, they are rescued by Ace Squadron, who rendezvous with the Colossus for a pick-up. Norath invites Kaz to join the Resistance, but he decides to remain with his Colossus friends.
35	14	"The Mutiny"	Bosco Ng	Mairghread Scott	January 5, 2020	214	N/A
Seeking to take over the Colossus, Warbirds pirate gang's leader Kragan Gorr buys several B2 super battle droids from Sidon Ithano, the "Crimson Corsair". Unfortunately, the super battle droids are not in good condition to function. With tensions between Captain Doza and the pirates growing, Doza and Yeager task Neeku with spying on the Warbirds. Kragan convinces Neeku to help repair the super battle droids. Synara, who has befriended the locals, senses that Kragan is up to something and confides with Kaz. With the super battle droids ready, Kragan imprisons Neeku, Kaz and Synara and launches a mutiny against Captain Doza, overwhelming the defenders. However, Neeku has reprogrammed a B1 battle droid (who frees the trio) as a commander, who takes control of the super battle droids and disarms the pirates. The Warbirds are exiled from the Colossus (with Doza threatening to execute them should they ever return and try to take revenge), except Synara.
36	15	"The New World"	Steward Lee	Jennifer Corbett	January 12, 2020	215	0.12
The Colossus travels to the uncharted ocean world of Aeos Prime, hoping to find a safe haven. Kaz goes on a scouting expedition with former Imperial pilot Griff Halloran and their droids CB-23 and R5-G9. Kaz discovers a ruined village, a First Order TIE fighter pilot's helmet, and an abandoned rebel base. He and the others are captured by the native Aeosians, blue-skinned humanoids who ride on winged beasts called Krakavora. Believing the newcomers to be hostile, the Queen orders her forces to attack the Colossus and to execute Kaz and his group. Aeosian warriors attack the Colossus, destroying B1 and several super battle droids. Kaz manages to convince the Queen of their peaceful intentions by healing a wounded Aeosian. The Queen calls for a halt to hostilities. After meeting with Captain Doza, she allows the Colossus to seek sanctuary on her homeworld.
37	16	"No Place Safe"	Brad Rau	Gavin Hignight	January 12, 2020	216	0.12
While the Colossus residents settle into their new home and mingle with the Aeosian natives, Kaz decides to return to the Resistance and makes arrangements with Norath to rendezvous near the planet Batuu, although Torra and Neeku aren't happy to learn that Kaz is leaving. Meanwhile, Commander Pyre dispatches several probe droids to search for the Colossus. Kaz encounters one of these probe droids while departing Aeos Prime aboard the Fireball. Kaz manages to destroy the probe droid, but the Fireball suffers extensive damage. CB-23 manages to repair the ship, allowing Kaz to return and warn the Colossus and Aeosians that the First Order is coming. Pyre's Star Destroyer arrives and dispatches several TIE fighters and bombers. During the ensuing dogfight, TIE cadets Tam and Rucklin see action against the Aces and their Aeosian allies, who manage to destroy several fighters and a bomber. Flying Yeager's racer, Kaz attempts to take out the Star Destroyer's bridge with a missile, but is thwarted by Tam. After reaching space, the Colossus manages to flee into hyperspace with the Aces. Yeager and a reluctant Kaz believe that Tam has chosen the First Order and is no longer their friend. Tam is promoted by Agent Tierny to Second Squadron Commander for her role in saving the Star Destroyer.
38	17	"Rebuilding the Resistance"	Bosco Ng	Jennifer Corbett	January 19, 2020	217	N/A
Resistance Commander Venisa Doza reunites with her family on the Colossus. With the approval of her husband Captain Doza, she recruits her daughter Torra, Kaz and Hype for a mission to evacuate several Resistance recruits on Dantooine. The Aces join Venisa's Jade Squadron, which includes Norath Kev and Kaz's New Republic comrade Hugh Sion. Jade Squadron and the Aces wipe out a TIE patrol, but draw the attention of Commander Pyre and Agent Tierny, who dispatch First Order forces, including a conflicted Tam and a bloodthirsty Rucklin to intercept the rendezvous. Jade Squadron manages to rendezvous with the shuttles, but are attacked by First Order TIE fighters. Despite shooting down many TIEs, including Lieutenant Galek's, Rucklin manages to shoot down one of the shuttles. Tam hesitantly tries to shoot Kaz's ship, but is thwarted by Sion, although she survives. Jade Squadron and the two remaining shuttles manage to escape to the Colossus. Kaz, Torra and Hype are distraught by the loss of the shuttle, but Venisa tells them not to give up on hope. Captain Doza allows the Resistance recruits to stay, committing the station to the Resistance. Tam is promoted to Squadron Leader by Tierny, but earns the enmity of a jealous Rucklin, who believes that position should belong to him. Tam, on the other hand, begins to have doubts over her decision of joining the First Order.
39	18	"The Escape"	Steward Lee	Brandon Auman	January 26, 2020	218	N/A
40	19	"The Escape"	Brad Rau	Brandon Auman	January 26, 2020	219	N/A
After the First Order bomb a village on Aeos Prime as punishment for the residents aiding the Colossus, Tam, finally realizing the First Order's true colors, decides to defect from the First Order and return to the Colossus. She arranges to meet with Kaz, Yeager and CB-23 on Castilon under the guise of a training flight. Tam is forced to knock out Rucklin and shoot down the other TIE fighters when they attack Kaz and Yeager's stolen First Order shuttle. After a brief reunion, Tam and her friends attempt to return to the Colossus, but are trapped in Commander Pyre's Star Destroyer's tractor beam. Tired of their continued failures, Supreme Leader Kylo Ren has ordered Pyre and Tierny to destroy the Colossus. Tam and Rucklin are captured while Kaz, Yeager and CB-23 manage to escape. In an attempt to save his own life and prove his loyalty, Rucklin reveals that the Colossus is in the Barabesh system but Pyre and Tierny are unmoved. Kaz and Yeager rescue Tam, who knocks out Rucklin. Working with CB-23, Kaz, Tam and Yeager send a transmission to the Colossus warning them to flee. The humans are subsequently captured, but CB manages to escape. The Colossus residents decide to help Kaz, Yeager and Tam and prepare to confront Pyre's Star Destroyer. During the ensuing battle, the Ace and Jade Squadrons attack the Star Destroyer's engines while CB-23 manages to disable the Star Destroyer's shield generator. Following a fight with Pyre, Kaz and his friends escape the stricken Star Destroyer. Tierny is Force-choked to her death by a displeased Ren as the Star Destroyer explodes, killing Pyre, Rucklin, and everyone else on board. Tam is welcomed back by Yeager, Kaz, the Dozas, Aces and Jade Squadron at Aunt Z's Tavern.

== Production ==
=== Development ===
On February 22, 2018, /Film reported that Lucasfilm had trademarked the name Star Wars Resistance for a wide range of merchandise and a potential animated series. On April 26, the series was officially announced and scheduled for a Fall 2018 debut. The show was created by Dave Filoni, who previously directed the 2008 film Star Wars: The Clone Wars, developed the subsequent television series, created, developed and executive produced Star Wars Rebels, and in 2017 became the head of Lucasfilm Animation. Filoni said the show was influenced by anime and by his grandfather's experiences in World War II. By August 1, 2018, Polygon Pictures was selected as the animation production company.

On August 12, 2018, Filoni stated that he would not work as directly on Resistance in a day-to-day capacity as he had on previous projects due to his work on The Clone Wars revival. However, he provided direction and notes to the story team, a role he compared to George Lucas' input on The Clone Wars.

=== Casting ===
Along with the official series announcement, it was announced that Oscar Isaac and Gwendoline Christie would reprise their roles as Poe Dameron and Captain Phasma, respectively. They are joined by Christopher Sean, Bobby Moynihan, Suzie McGrath, Scott Lawrence, Myrna Velasco, Josh Brener, Donald Faison and Jim Rash. General Leia Organa, Kylo Ren and BB-8 have appeared in the series.

== Release ==
=== Marketing ===
A trailer was released on August 17, 2018, showcasing the new animation style and characters. It received a negative reaction from fans, including criticism for its apparent targeting of younger viewers and both praise and criticism for the anime-style CGI. Blair Marnell of Nerdist compared the initial reaction to the early stigma The Clone Wars and Rebels suffered for similarly targeting younger demographics during release, only for both to become more positively received with subsequent seasons.

=== Broadcast ===
The series debuted in the United States on the Disney Channel on October 7, 2018, with Disney XD airing the series later in the United States and worldwide, with the exception of Southeast Asia, where all live-action shows are sold by Disney's Southeast Asian channel. The series was renewed for a second season, which aired in October 2019. Its first episode, which picks up directly after the end of the first season, was screened at Star Wars Celebration in Chicago.

Season two premiered on Sunday, October 6, (10 p.m. EDT/PDT) on Disney Channel and DisneyNOW, with subsequent airings on Disney XD. Season two was the final season of the show and consisted of 19 episodes.

=== Home media ===
As announced on July 23, 2019, Lucasfilm released the first season on DVD on August 20. It includes all 21 episodes of season one, as well as an exclusive sneak-peek at the making of the show with cast and crew, 4 audio commentaries with Sean, Lawrence, Brener and Velasco, the 12 shorts and Resistance Rewind.

The first season of Star Wars Resistance became available for streaming on November 12, 2019, the launch date for Disney+. The second season became available on February 25, 2020.

== Reception ==
=== Critical response ===
On review aggregator Rotten Tomatoes, season 1 has an approval rating of 93% based reviews from 14 critics, with an average rating of 6.70/10. The site's critics consensus states, "Star Wars: Resistance's streamlined story sets the stage for exciting adventures—and seems poised to explore a canvas stocked with immediately relatable characters and plenty of potential."

William Hughes of The A.V. Club praised the first episode saying "At the end of its first hour, Resistance feels pleasantly primed with potential." He gave it a grade B. Brian Lowry of CNN gave it a mixed review, he notes that previous Star Wars shows offered plenty for older fans but that this show was more clearly made for a younger audience, and "Star Wars Resistance paints with a much brighter, more colorful palette, but at least initially settles for more pallid characters and situations—the kind that don't immediately suggest this is the animated show you're looking for." Syfy Wire notes that "Resistance's cel-shading animation style stands out amongst the franchise's traditional CG-animated fare." Emily Ashby of Common Sense Media called the series "lighthearted" and downplaying cartoon violence. She also argued that the series has a lot of humor, has characters demonstrate traits of determination and courage, saying that the series had vivid animation and "high-flying action" which dominates the series plot.

=== Awards ===
Year	Award	Category	Nominee	Result	Ref.
2019	Primetime Emmy Awards	Outstanding Children's Program	Star Wars Resistance	Nominated	
2019	Saturn Awards	Best Animated Series	Star Wars Resistance	Won	
2020	Primetime Emmy Awards	Outstanding Children's Program	Star Wars Resistance	Nominated	
