= Tekken: Bloodline =

Japanese anime television series

- Key visual
- Genre: Action; Fantasy; Martial arts
- Created by: Bandai Namco Entertainment
- Original net animation
- Directed by: Yoshikazu Miyao
- Produced by: Yuji Miyazaki; Takafumi Fujisawa
- Written by: Gavin Hignight
- Music by: Rei Kondoh
- Studio: Studio Hibari; Larx Entertainment
- Licensed by: Netflix
- Released: August 18, 2022
- Runtime: 22–27 minutes
- Episodes: 6

Tekken: Bloodline is an action fantasy anime television miniseries based on the video game series Tekken by Bandai Namco Entertainment. The series loosely adapts the events of the 1997 video game Tekken 3 and follows the young fighter Jin Kazama in his quest to defeat Ogre, the creature that killed his mother Jun. Jin's quest leads to him being trained to track Ogre by his violent grandfather Heihachi Mishima, who is hosting a fighting tournament called the King of Iron Fist. The show premiered on Netflix on August 18, 2022, for a total of six episodes.

The series was produced as a coming-of-age story of Jin, something that game series director Katsuhiro Harada wanted to emphasize, since Tekken 3 did not highlight Jin's past. It was directed by Yoshikazu Miyao, who wanted to properly show Jin's tragic story.

The series received mixed responses as a result of its short length, providing little screentime to most characters besides Jin and instead emphasizing fight scenes. The style and quality of the show's animation were also questioned.

== Synopsis ==
Jin Kazama is a young martial artist living with his pacifist mother, Jun Kazama, on Yakushima Island. One day, the ancient demon Ogre attacks their home, ultimately leading to Jun's death. Following the instructions given in her last words, Jin meets with his grandfather, a businessman and martial artist named Heihachi Mishima. Heihachi takes an interest in Jin and trains him in the more violent Mishima style of martial arts in order to avenge Jun, instructing Jin to drop the pacifist methods of the Kazama Style. After four years of training, Heihachi begins the King of Iron Fist tournament where Jin will compete to draw out Ogre.

Following his arrival in Cusco for the tournament, Jin learns that his father is Kazuya Mishima, a martial artist with the power of Devil. Heihachi killed Kazuya in the previous tournament to stop him from ruining the world. Jin inherited the Devil Gene from his father, which attracted Ogre to his home. In the King of Iron Fist tournament, Jin becomes conflicted about his violent style after breaking one of his rivals' legs. For the next match, Jin abandons the Mishima values as he also befriends another fighter and fellow high school student, Ling Xiaoyu, who reminds him of his mother's methods, as well as earning a friendly rivalry with Hwoarang. He also befriends Julia Chang and the tournament veteran, Paul Phoenix. Now at peace, Jin wins the tournament. Angered by Jin's pacifism, Heihachi challenges Jin to prove he is the winner of the tournament, but their fight is interrupted by Ogre's reawakening. Jin manages to defeat Ogre with the help from Xiaoyu, Hwoarang, Paul and Julia, but he is killed by Heihachi in the aftermath as it is revealed that Heihachi feared that he would become like his father. Jin finds his mother on his road to the afterlife, but his Devil Gene awakens and revives him in a demonic form with black feathered wings. Jin easily subdues Heihachi and nearly kills him. As Xiaoyu and Hwoarang's pleas reach his ears, Jin flies away to an unknown point.

== Characters ==
Character	Japanese voice actor	English dubbing actor
Jin Kazama	Isshin Chiba	Kaiji Tang
Jun Kazama	Mamiko Noto	Vivian Lu
Heihachi Mishima	Taiten Kusunoki	S. Hiroshi Watanabe
Kazuya Mishima	Masanori Shinohara	Eliot
Hwoarang	Toshiyuki Morikawa	Todd Haberkorn
Ling Xiaoyu	Maaya Sakamoto	Faye Mata
Paul Phoenix	Hōchū Ōtsuka	Jamieson Price
Julia Chang	Seiko Yoshida	Jeannie Tirado
Nina Williams	Yumi Tōma	Erika Harlacher
Ganryu	Hidenari Ugaki	Earl Baylon
Leroy Smith	Yasuhiro Kikuchi	Krizz Kaliko
King	Masayuki Hirai	Leandro Cano
Ogre	–	Bill Butts
Dr. Bosconovitch	–	Jamieson Price
Akiko Miura	Mariya Ise	Judy Alice Lee

== Production and release ==
On March 19, 2022, Netflix announced that they would release the series on August 18, 2022. The series was created as an homage to the third title in the Tekken franchise, Tekken 3. The producers explained how the staff tried to be faithful to the original narrative of the franchise by having the characters perform several moves from the games and using audio snippets from the games. As the series is based on Tekken 3, the story focuses on the origins of Jin Kazama and his upbringing under his mother Jun, which is not explored in the original material due to the difficulty of storytelling through video games. As a result, the anime creates its own story which was not present in older installments of the franchise. All episodes were written by Gavin Hignight, while the series' director was Yoshikazu Miyao.

Game designer Katsuhiro Harada was involved in the project and stated that he enjoyed the story of Jin's life. Miyao claimed that some of the show's battles were difficult to animate due to the necessity of faithfulness to the original games. He called Jin's story tragic, as the initially innocent character develops negatively over the series and ultimately is saddened at his transition to a devilish form. As most of the episodes take place in Cusco, Peru, Hignight said that the staff in charge of the series were capable of recapturing the feeling of such country, most importantly when Jin reaches it.

The characters were designed by Heart alongside Satoshi Yuri. Jin's full body costume was an original creation not present in the game. A hood was added to the costume at Miyao's request. The theme of the series involves Jin's growth, so character designers created a variety of differences between his two personas in order to generate a major visual contrast. Heihachi's everyday clothing was also completely redesigned. The music for the series was composed by Rei Kondoh, and an album of 27 tracks was released alongside the anime.

== Reception ==
Initial response to the trailers was positive according to the producers. The series received positive responses from critics as the writer Gavin Hignight was satisfied with the review that the series received from Yahoo!, as it was acclaimed by them as one of the best video game adaptations. Similar responses were given Comic Book Resources and Meristation who found it as well-done and faithful adaptation of a video game. The narrative of Bloodline was praised by the media for how the narrative offers multiple points of view of Jin's morals, as he is trained by both his pacifist mother and his violent grandfather. Despite this praise, the series' heavy focus on Jin over the supporting cast was criticized. Decider said the depiction of Jin's training should have been more dynamic and stated, along with Meristation, that only the first episode was well-executed. On the other hand, Espinof found the King of Iron Fist Tournament's episodes to be more exciting than Jin's training, as they adapted the video game's story more faithfully. However, Espinof lamented that some well-known characters get too little screentime when compared to Jin. The Review Geek and Den of Geek also praised the adaptation for being faithful to Tekken 3 and stated that they would have liked a longer series to depict more fights and character development for Jin. Jin's characterization was compared with that of archetypal shōnen manga protagonists due to his personality and powers, and Jin's relationship with Hwoarang was comparable to typical rivalry from the same genre. On a more negative view, Monique Thomas from Anime News Network listed the series as the worst Summer 2022 anime he watched for lacking the campy and over-the-top elements that the games are known for such its animal fighters, opining that the series came across as too serious. Polygon criticized most of the cast for coming across as one-dimensional with the exception of Heihachi, and lamented that most campy fighters were barely shown.

The animation was criticized for the heavy use of silhouettes of every character, and Polygon lamented the short fights and lack of realism in the fighters. Decider called the animation "sluggish" and felt the character designs were unfaithful to the games. Review Geek enjoyed the mix of 2D and 3D animation, especially in the designs of Jin, Xiaoyu, and King. Despite finding issues with the series' CGI, Comic Book Resources found the animation generally acceptable. Meristation was positive regarding the series' handling of fights, as they found the movements similar to the ones depicted in the video games. Isshin Chiba's performance as Jin was acclaimed by the media as his best one in video games, while Vivian Lu stood out in the English dub for her calm take on Jun according to Decider. Newcomers Erika Harlacher (Nina) and Jeannie Tirado (Julia) were praised by GameRant for imitating their Japanese counterparts well. Meristation also praised the original soundtrack, which comes across as having been inspired by the video game.
