= Transformers: Cyberverse =

2018 CGI animated series

- Also known as: Transformers: Bumblebee Cyberverse Adventures (seasons 3–4)
- Genre: Action; Adventure; Science fiction; Comedy drama
- Based on: Transformers by Hasbro and Takara Tomy
- Directed by: Robert Cullen; Ehud Landsberg; Jean Texier
- Voices of: Jeremy Levy; Ryan Andes; Jake Foushee; Jessica DiGiovanni; Marc Thompson; Deanna McGovern; Billy Bob Thompson; Marc Swint; Liane Marie Dobbs; Saskia Marx; Tony Daniels; Travis Artz
- Theme music composer: Max Repka; Toonocracy LLC
- Composers: Max Repka; Toonocracy LLC
- Countries of origin: United States; Ireland
- Original language: English
- No. of seasons: 4
- No. of episodes: 64 (list of episodes)

Production
- Executive producers: Stephen Davis (seasons 1–3); Olivier Dumont (season 4); Randi Yaffa (season 4)
- Producers: Peter Lewis; Jon Wigfield (season 4)
- Running time: 10 minutes (season 1-3); 44 minutes (season 4)
- Production companies: Boulder Media; Allspark Animation (seasons 1–3); Entertainment One (season 4)

Original release
- Network: Cartoon Network (seasons 1–3); Netflix (season 4); YouTube
- Release: 27 August 2018 – 22 December 2021

Transformers: Cyberverse (later known as Transformers: Bumblebee Cyberverse Adventures) is a cel-shaded computer-animated series based on the Transformers toy franchise by Hasbro. The series debuted on Cartoon Network on 27 August 2018.

== Premise ==
When Bumblebee begins to suffer amnesia, his partner, Windblade, comes to the rescue and begins the process of helping him repair his memory files, enabling him to rediscover his past adventures on Cybertron. Once his memories are repaired, Bumblebee gets a clue that will lead both him and Windblade to complete their current mission and save their friends.

=== Synopsis ===
==== Chapter One ====
Prior to the series, Cybertron was a peaceful planet, but when Megatron was elected supreme ruler of Cybertron, half of the planet's inhabitants protested against his rule which escalated into a civil war in an effort to overthrow him.

During the war on Cybertron between the Autobots and the Decepticons, Optimus Prime decides to throw the AllSpark through a space bridge to an unknown location. The AllSpark holds all Cybertronian life and possesses vast powers that must not fall in the hands of the Decepticons. Eventually, it becomes clear that Cybertron is slowly dying without the AllSpark.

Optimus Prime goes on a journey to find the AllSpark on a spaceship called the Ark together with Bumblebee, Arcee, Prowl, Grimlock, Ratchet, Wheeljack, Chromia, Rack'n'Ruin, Drift, Teletraan-1 and Teletraan-X. Due to Energon shortage, all Autobots have to go into stasis. The Ark finds the AllSpark on Earth, but it gets damaged and crashes. Bumblebee and Grimlock fall out of the ship before the Ark hits the surface. Bumblebee stays in stasis, while Grimlock befriends the dinosaurs and teaches them Cybertronian technology. They search the entire planet for the Ark and the AllSpark, but then a meteorite crashes on Earth. The dinosaurs go extinct and Grimlock goes back into stasis.

The first chapter focuses on Windblade who was the only bot able to get through a partially repaired space bridge. She lands on Earth in search for the Ark. She only finds Bumblebee, who has now awoken from stasis, but has lost all his memory files. Windblade possesses telepathic powers and helps Bumblebee to restore his memory. Old memories from Cybertron and the journey on the Ark are rediscovered in every episode. Meanwhile, they have to defend themselves against several Decepticons, who are also looking for the Ark and the AllSpark.

Eventually, they find Teletraan-X, a flying hard drive of the Ark, and they manage to find and awaken Grimlock. Teletraan-X is able to locate the Ark with the data Grimlock has collected. They wake up all Autobots on board from stasis right before Starscream arrives on Earth with his Decepticon armada.

==== Chapter Two: Power of the Spark ====
Following the Autobots' reawakening, they and the Decepticons continue their war on Earth as Megatron attempts to slam Earth's moon into the planet. In the ensuing battle, Megatron is wounded by Optimus Prime, and when Starscream refuses to aid him, Megatron names Slipstream the new commander of the Seekers. Tired of being humiliated and insulted by Megatron, Starscream attacks him and briefly takes command of the Decepticons. However, Megatron survives the attempt and apparently kills Starscream in revenge, leaving his body on the moon. Meanwhile, the Autobots destroy the device the Decepticons were trying to use to make the moon smash into Earth, but as they celebrate their victory, Bumblebee sees a yellow, spotted Earth creature watching him.

With help from Arcee, Bumblebee is able to identify the creature as a cheetah. The cheetah is eventually seen by Megatron, and both he and Optimus Prime learn that this cheetah is Cheetor, a Cybertronian created by the AllSpark to serve as its guardian. Cheetor holds a contest where Optimus and Megatron battle one another to see who is worthy of holding the AllSpark. But before a winner can be determined, a still-living Starscream appears and steals the AllSpark for himself. Using the AllSpark and Vector Sigma, the now-insane Starscream creates an army of Scraplets, planning to use the AllSpark's power to kill everyone who opposes him. Slipstream tries to warn the Decepticons and Autobots of Starscream's plan but is only successful in informing Windblade before being killed by the Decepticon Bludgeon, who believes that she had sided with Starscream like most of the Seekers had done.

Powered by the AllSpark, Starscream attacks both sides but is driven off by Cheetor, who has now sided with the Autobots. Later, the Autobot Jetfire and Decepticon Sky-Byte come to Earth, pursuing one another to put an end to their rivalry. Starscream pits the two against one another to distract both sides from his plans, but this eventually leads to the two leading their respective sides to right to him. After absorbing the sparks of his fellow Seekers, Starscream attempts to do the same to the Autobots and Decepticons, but Optimus uses the Matrix of Leadership to rob Starscream of the AllSpark. Cheetor recovers it for the Autobots, and they also take Starscream prisoner.

With the AllSpark in hand, the Autobots leave Earth to return to Cybertron. Unknown to them, the Decepticons use a Space Bridge built by Shockwave to get back to their home first. During the journey back to Cybertron, Windblade uses the AllSpark to reawaken Croaton, an ancient Titan who was forced into emergency stasis by an unknown force that kidnapped the colonists who were traveling with him. As Croaton departs into space to find his missing colonists, he unknowingly picks up an escaping Starscream as a passenger. Eventually, the Autobots discover another Space Bridge which they use to travel to Cybertron, unaware that Megatron has already conquered the planet and is leading the Autobots into a trap.

==== Chapter Three: Bumblebee Cyberverse Adventures ====
The third season consists of three arcs: the Autobots and Decepticons battling for the AllSpark and control of Cybertron, the Quintesson invasion, and Bumblebee searching for pieces of Windblade's fragmented mind.

Picking up where the last season left off, the Decepticons have beaten the Ark back to Cybertron and attempt to lure the arriving Autobots into a death trap. However, Optimus anticipated this and evacuated the ship's crew before the Ark flies into a laser snare set up by Shockwave and is destroyed. The Autobots soon reveal themselves and a large-scale battle occurs between both sides, with the Autobot Prowl taking a fatal shot from Shadow Striker meant for Optimus. With help from Windblade, Wheeljack destroys Vector Sigma by sending it into Unspace, while Windblade knocks Bludgeon into Unspace with Vector Sigma, avenging Slipstream.

Meanwhile, Hot Rod leads Bumblebee and Cheetor to the Well of the AllSpark, to return the AllSpark there and revitalize Cybertron. Despite interference from Shockwave, the team is successful, but Cheetor sacrifices himself to save the AllSpark when Shockwave attempts to corrupt it. Megatron is defeated after Optimus knocks him into a swarm of scraplets, allowing the Autobots to achieve complete victory.

However, not long afterward, the multiverse-conquering Quintessons invade Cybertron, easily conquering the planet and trapping most Transformers in a groundhog day loop that slowly drains their sparks. Evading capture, Hot Rod and Perceptor free some Autobots and Decepticons to form a resistance against the Quintessons. The resistance discovers that beneath Maccadam's Old Oil House lies an ancient war Titan called Iaconus, and Hot Rod decides to reawaken him using Windblade. Though they initially clash for leadership, Hot Rod and Soundwave learn to work together, defeating the Quintesson's scientist and freeing the rest of their fellow Transformers.

The Autobots and Decepticons agree to work together to bring the Quintessons down, with Wheeljack discovering that the Quintessons have a multiverse drive that allows them to conquer other universes. Optimus, Bumblebee, Wheeljack, Megatron, and Dead End sneak onto the Quintessons' main ship to destroy it, while Hot Rod and Soundwave lead the rest of the Transformers in destroying their main tower and Windblade partially awakens Iaconus. Megatron betrays Optimus and travels through the multiverse portal with Dead End before the tower is destroyed. Moments later, Starscream emerges from the rubble, having been made the judge of this universe by the Quintessons and eager to use his new power to conquer Cybertron for himself.

While Starscream incapacitates the Transformers, Optimus heads into the multiverse with Bumblebee and Wheeljack in an attempt to escape. Windblade and Maccadam manage to fully raise Iaconus, but Starscream counters with a brainwashed Croaton. Maccadam frees the Transformers from Starscream's captivity before being killed by a stray blast from Croaton. When Iaconus appears to gain the upper hand, Starscream summons an Unspace portal to decapitate Iaconus, killing him, before Croaton begins to lay waste to the rest of Iacon City.

Optimus, Bumblebee, and Wheeljack escape the multiverse and end up in the Quintesson scientist's lab and are attacked by the Scientist himself using clone bodies. Wheeljack finds the bodies' controller and kills him before the trio are attacked by Starscream. Megatron returns from the multiverse, aided by Dead End and Astrotrain, to aid his fellow Transformers. Windblade manages to free Croaton from Quintesson control, but ends up shattering her consciousness, which scatter all across Cybertron. Croaton takes Windblade away from the battle so she can rest. Megatron reveals to Optimus he has acquired his own Matrix of Leadership from the multiverse, and both Optimus and Megatron use their Matrices to end Starscream's threat for good.

In the aftermath of the Quintesson takeover, Cybertron is divided up evenly between the Autobots and Decepticons, with a barrier being constructed to separate their territories. Bumblebee sneaks into Decepticon territory and finds Windblade's body there, the Cityspeaker having been discovered by Shadow Striker. Sympathetic to Windblade's current condition, Shadow Striker allows Bumblebee to leave with her. With help from Chromia and Grimlock, Bumblebee travels to various corners of Cybertron to find the lost fragments of Windblade's mind, from the legendary Crystal City, to a forbidden moon, the prehistoric Cybertronian underworld, and the gaseous Argon Sea.

Meanwhile, the rest of the Autobots investigate Megatron's activities, finding that he is preparing for the coming threat of someone known as "the Other One". From his Matrix, Optimus receives a message from the spirit of Maccadam, revealed to be Alchemist of the original Thirteen Primes, telling him that the last of Windblade's memory fragments is inside Megatron's Matrix. Optimus leads an infiltration mission into Decepticon territory to destroy said Matrix, but they are soon discovered. Megatron insists that both Matrices must be used against the Other One before mysterious troopers appear and attack both sides. These troops are revealed to be Decepticons from an alternate timeline, specifically the "perfect" Decepticons Megatron once dreamed of creating.

Though both sides attempt to fight off the perfect Decepticons, the Other One himself soon arrives, revealing himself to be an alternate universe version of Megatron. In his universe, this Megatron, called Megatron X, killed his Optimus and stole his Matrix before using the AllSpark and Vector Sigma to create his perfect Decepticons. When the Quintessons invaded years later, Megatron X destroyed them with the Matrix and stole their multiverse technology. Megatron X kills his prime universe counterpart before Bumblebee steals the Matrix and races to the planetary border, with Optimus soon coming to Bumblebee's aid.

Within Megatron's Matrix, the last of Windblade's memory fragments learns from the spirit of the alternate Optimus that this Matrix must be destroyed to defeat Megatron X. Although initially shocked at this revelation, Windblade complies, short-circuiting the alternate Matrix from within and allowing Optimus to overcome and defeat Megatron X. After Bumblebee collects Windblade's last memory fragment, Astrotrain takes Megatron X into the multiverse, intending to trap him there forever. With the last memory fragment secured, Windblade is fully restored to the Autobots' delight, ending the season.

==== Chapter Four: Bumblebee Cyberverse Adventures ====
===== Movie Part 1: The Immobilizers =====
Arcee and Grimlock venture to another planet to retrieve Nexus Prime's artifacts. Meanwhile, back on Cybertron, during the peace treaty ceremony, the planet is frozen by a group of mercenaries led by Soundblaster, a former Decepticon who defected after Soundwave was chosen over him. Arcee and Grimlock arrive and try to assess the situation, but Arcee is captured and Grimlock finds another group of Dinobots, survivors of another planet previously destroyed by mercenaries who received Grimlock's message from prehistoric Earth. Later they combine into Volcanicus using the Enigma of Combination's powers. After learning how to handle it, they face the mercenaries and defeat them, but their employer Trypticon arrives and takes over the fight while they escape, Volcanicus defeats Trypticon using an immobilizer gun the mercenaries left behind. With some help from Wheeljack, they reanimate the entire planet and its inhabitants minus Trypticon and continue the celebration.

===== Movie Part 2: The Perfect Decepticon =====
The Autobots and the Decepticons are celebrating the opening of Trypticon's plaza, but are interrupted by a mortally wounded Astrotrain who warns them of a threat worse than the other Megatron. The Autobots and the Decepticons try to stop the invasion, but the Perfect Decepticons arrive, and immediately begin fighting each other. One of them, Tarn, explains that they were mindless slaves of Megatron whom after taking revenge on Astrotrain for his demise had been fighting one another to choose the strongest as their new leader, he then tells them about the Cortex Helm, an artifact of Onyx Prime that will help them reprogram Tarn's kin. They agree to help him, and a group consisting of Optimus Prime, Bumblebee, Soundwave and Shadow Striker accompany him, and with help from Thunderhowl they find the Cortex Helm. Tarn then reveals his deception and uses the helm to control the Perfect Decepticons, he then announces himself as the new leader of all Decepticons and declares war on the Autobots. Afterwards, he forces Optimus into a Gladiator fight with his army. The Autobots save Optimus and join forces with their Decepticons against the invaders. Amidst the battle, Soundwave ultimately sacrifices himself to destroy Tarn and free the Perfect Decepticons. Afterwards, everyone holds a memorial service for Soundwave as all of Cybertron achieves true peace.

== Episodes ==
Season	Episodes	Subtitle	Originally aired		Network
Season	Episodes	Subtitle	Season premiere	Season finale	Network
1	18	None	September 1, 2018	December 29, 2018	Cartoon Network
2	18	Power of the Spark	September 7, 2019	January 4, 2020	Cartoon Network
3	26	Bumblebee Cyberverse Adventures	March 15, 2020	June 7, 2020	Cartoon Network
4	2	Bumblebee Cyberverse Adventures	November 22, 2021	December 22, 2021	Netflix

== Voice cast ==
- Ben Bott as Thundercracker
- Billy Bob Thompson as Starscream, Wheeljack, Repugnus, Hammerbyte, Trypticon
- Deanna McGovern as Shadow Striker, Clobber (Season 4)
- Dick Terhune as Maccadam, Prowl, Quintesson Judge (Chaos), Quintesson Scientist
- Jaime Lamchick as Arcee, Acid Storm, Chromia, Alpha Strike, Nightbird
- Jake Foushee as Optimus Prime
- JC Ernst as Blurr
- Jeremy Levy as Bumblebee, Rack'n'Ruin, Jetfire, Perceptor, Whirl, Quintesson Judge (Death), Gnaw
- Jessica DiGiovanni as Windblade, Cosmos
- Laurie Hymes as Swoop
- Lianne Marie Dobbs as Slipstream
- Marc Swint as Soundwave
- Marc Thompson as Megatron, Sky-Byte, Megatron X, Sludge, Soundblaster, Bug Bite, Tarn
- Rich Orlow as Alpha Trion, Wildwheel, Thunderhowl, Meteorfire, Slug, Snarl, Afterburner
- Ryan Andes as Grimlock, Shockwave, Iaconus, Doublecrosser
- Ryan Nicolls as Volcanicus
- Saskia Marx as Clobber (Seasons 2–3), Nova Storm, Quintesson Judge (Cruelty, Judgment)
- TJ Nelson as Cheetor
- Todd Perlmutter as Ratchet
- Tomas Virgadula as Thrust
- Tony Daniels as Teletraan-X, Teletraan-1, Lockdown, Drift, Croaton, Kup, Quintesson Judge (Ego), Astrotrain
- Travis Artz as Hot Rod
- Xavier Paul as Dead End

== Production ==
On 7 June 2017, Boulder Media Limited confirmed working on an additional Transformers series besides Transformers: Rescue Bots Academy.

Transformers: Cyberverse was first announced during Hasbro Media and Investor Day in August 2017. The first season, titled "Chapter 1", would air in 2018, while a second season, titled "Chapter 2", is set to air in 2019. The series puts more emphasis on characters. The first season consists of eighteen eleven-minute episodes.

On 23 September 2017, Hasbro applied a trademark for the series and its related products.

On 14 October 2017, a first look of the series was revealed, along with the synopsis.

On 9 December 2017, Dan Salgarolo, who previously worked on Transformers: Robots in Disguise, has joined the series. On 9 April 2018, voice actor Lianne Marie Dobbs has also joined the series.

A 1-minute clip from the episode "Megatron is My Hero" was previewed at the 2018 San Diego Comic-Con, alongside the show's intro.

On 23 July 2018, it was announced that the home channel for the series is Cartoon Network.

On 23 August 2018, a trailer was released, with the premiere date revealed to be 1 September 2018.

On 9 February 2019, it was announced that season 2 would be released in Q4 2019.

On 28 September 2019, it was announced that the series has been renewed for the third and final season for 2020. It has also retitled as Transformers: Bumblebee Cyberverse Adventures.

On 6 October 2020, it was announced that two Transformers Cyberverse TV movies are currently in production.

On 28 January 2021, the titles for the two Transformers Cyberverse TV movies were revealed.

On 29 May 2021, it was announced that the two Transformers Cyberverse TV movies will be released on Netflix on 21 November 2021.

On 24 October 2021, it was announced the TV movies would air early on Teletoon on 7 November 2021.

== Broadcast and release ==
Similar to Transformers: Prime and Transformers: Robots in Disguise, Cartoon Network acquired the global broadcasting rights for the series, which includes linear and digital rights.

The series premiered in the United States on Cartoon Network, with the first two episodes released earlier on the Cartoon Network App on 27 August 2018, and debuting on television on 1 September 2018; starting with the third episode, subsequent episodes are released in advance on Fridays on the Cartoon Network App before the television broadcast. In Canada, the series premiered on Teletoon on 16 September 2018 and YTV on 28 September 2018.

Internationally, the series premiered on RTL 7 in the Netherlands on 2 September 2018, on Cartoon Network on 29 September 2018, in Australia, 2 October 2018 in Latin America, 27 October 2018 in India, Central and Eastern Europe, and the United Kingdom, on Gulli on 7 October 2018, in France., on Spacetoon in 2020 in the Arab League, on Pop in Pakistan and on TV5 in the Philippines with a Filipino dub on 11 June 2023, coincided with the release of the 2023 Transformers film Transformers: Rise of the Beasts.

Hasbro started to release the series on the official Transformers YouTube channel since 7 September 2018. Episodes in many other languages have followed suit. Unlike other web shows on Hasbro's YouTube channel, only select languages are available for specific regions, whilst the rest are region-locked.

The series are also made available for streaming online on FAST services Plex, Pluto TV (the third and fourth seasons only), The Roku Channel, Toon Goggles and Tubi (fourth season only), as well as Splash Entertainment's video-on-demand channel Kabillion.

=== Home media ===
The series started to be available on iTunes on 6 November 2018.

The first six episodes of season one were released on Region 4 DVD in Australia on 20 February 2019, by Beyond Home Entertainment. The second installment was released on DVD in April 2019 followed by the third and final release in June. Season two has yet to be released on DVD.

A video game based on the series, Transformers Battlegrounds, was released on 23 October 2020, for PlayStation 4, Xbox One, Nintendo Switch, and Microsoft Windows.

=== Accolades ===
Year	Award	Category	Recipient	Result	Ref.
2019	Irish Animation Awards	Best Writer for an Animated Series	Episode: "Megatron Is My Hero" (Peter Di Cicco)	Nominated	
2019	Irish Animation Awards	Best Sound Design	Episode: "Matrix of Leadership" (Windmill Lane)	Nominated	
2019	Irish Animation Awards	Kids' Choice Award For Best Animated Series (6–12 years)	Episode: "Megatron Is My Hero" (Peter Di Cicco)	Nominated	
