= List of animated television series of 2018 =

This is a list of animated television series first aired in 2018.

Title	Seasons	Episodes	Country	Year	Original channel	Technique
3Below: Tales of Arcadia	2	26	United States	2018–19	Netflix	CGI
16 Hudson	3	99	Canada	2018–present	TVOKids	Flash
44 Cats	2	104	Italy	2018–21	Rai Yoyo; Nick Jr. Italy	CGI
Abby's Amazing Adventures	3	33	United States	2018–21	HBO	Flash
Addison	2	50	Canada	2018–19	CBC Kids	Flash
The Adventures of Kid Danger	1	10	United States	2018	Nickelodeon	Flash
The Adventures of Ogu, Mampato and Rena	2	26	Chile	2018–23	Chilevisión; Cartoon Network	Flash
The Adventures of Rocky and Bullwinkle	1	26	United States	2018–19	Amazon Prime Video	Flash
Aerover	2	26	South Korea	2018	MBC	Traditional
Além da Lenda	1	13	Brazil	2018	TV Brasil	Flash
Allen's Pole	1	4	United States	2018	VRV	Flash
Anatane: Saving the Children of Okura	1	26	Canada; France	2018	Unis; France 4	Traditional
Animals in Mythology			India	2018	Epic TV	
Animazoo	3	39	Brazil	2018	SBT	Flash
Anittinha's Club	3	62	Brazil	2018–present	Gloob; Gloobinho	Flash
Apple & Onion	2	76	United States	2018–21	Cartoon Network	Flash
Arthur and the Children of the Round Table	2	98	France	2018	Télétoon+	CGI
AstroLOLogy	2	288	Malaysia	2018–20	YouTube	CGI
Atchoo!	2	104	Italy	2018–21	Rai Gulp	Flash
Athleticus	3	90	France	2018–22	Arte	CGI
Babyatrice	5	94	Canada	2018–present	Ici TOU.TV	Flash
Ballmastrz: 9009	2	20	United States	2018–20	Adult Swim	Flash/Traditional
Barangay 143	2	26	Philippines	2018–21	GMA Network (season 1); POPTV (season 2)	Traditional
Barbie Dreamhouse Adventures	5	52	Canada; United States	2018–20	Netflix	CGI
BBB Adventure	1	26	South Korea	2018–20	MBC TV	
The Beauty Blogger	1	20	China	2018	Tencent Video	
Becca's Bunch	1	24	United Kingdom	2018	Nick Jr.	CGI
Bela Criativa	1	13	Brazil	2018	TV Brasil	CGI
Beryl and Sapphire	4	96+	China	2018–present	Bilibili iQIYI; Tencent Video; Youku	
Beyond the Ocean	2	36	China	2018–20	iQIYI	CGI
Big Box Adventure!		5	United States	2018	BabyFirst	Flash
Big City Greens	5	116	United States	2018–present	Disney Channel	Traditional
Bitz & Bob	2	44	Canada; United Kingdom	2018–20	CBeebies	CGI
Bluey	3	154	Australia	2018–24	ABC Kids	Flash
Bo & To's Family	2	28	South Korea	2018–22	KBS2; KBS1	Stop motion
Bobolândia Monstrolândia	1	26	Brazil	2018	TV Cultura	Flash
Boris and Rufus	2	39	Brazil	2018–present	Disney XD	Flash
The Boss Baby: Back in Business	4	49	United States	2018–20	Netflix	CGI
Bubu and the Little Owls	2	52	Brazil	2018–21	Disney Junior	Flash
Butterbean's Café	2	60	Ireland; United States	2018–20	Nick Jr. Nick Jr. Channel	CGI
Buzzu na Escola Intergaláctica	2	52	Brazil	2018	Nat Geo Kids	CGI
Cathy Quest	2	92	Russia	2018–present	Moolt	Flash
The Champions	4	25	United States	2018–present	YouTube	Flash
Chip and Potato	4	63	Canada; United Kingdom	2018–21	Family Jr. Netflix	Flash/Traditional
The Chocolix	4	52	Brazil	2018–present	Nickelodeon	Flash
Chomp Squad	1	25	United States	2018	YouTube	Flash
Chop Chop Ninja	1	20	Canada	2018	Télétoon	Flash
Chris P. Duck	1	6	United States	2018	VRV	Flash
Cinderella Chef	3	36	China	2018–22	Bilibili	
Ciro Todorov	1	23	Argentina	2018	Pakapaka	Flash
Claude	2	61	United Kingdom	2018	Disney Junior	Flash
Cleo & Cuquin	2	78	Mexico; Spain	2018–20	Clan	CGI
Cocomelon			United States	2018–present	YouTube	CGI
Constantine: City of Demons	1	6	United States	2018–19	CW Seed	Traditional
Corner Gas Animated	4	48	Canada	2018–21	The Comedy Network	Flash
Cosmicrew	3	104	China	2018		CGI
Craig of the Creek	6	180	United States	2018–25	Cartoon Network	Traditional
Cry Babies: Magic Tears	7	148	Spain	2018–present	YouTube	CGI
Cupcake & Dino: General Services	2	26	Brazil; Canada	2018–19	Netflix; Teletoon; Disney XD	Flash
Daddy and the Big Boy	1	13	United States	2018	VRV	CGI
Daily Life Safety with Amber	1	26	South Korea	2018	EBS1	CGI
Dallas & Robo	1	8	United States	2018	YouTube Premium	Flash
Darwin & Newts	3	104	New Zealand	2018–21	TVNZ	Flash
Denver, the Last Dinosaur	1	52	France; United States	2018	M6	CGI
Disenchantment	3	50	United States	2018–23	Netflix	Traditional
Dorm Zero	1	14	China	2018	Bilibili iQIYI; Sohu Video; Tencent Video; Youku	
Douluo Dalu		263+	China	2018–present	Tencent Video	CGI
Doyok Otoy Ali Oncom		29	Indonesia	2018–24	MNCTV (2018); RTV (2021–24)	CGI
The Dragon Prince	7	63	United States	2018–24	Netflix	CGI/Traditional
Dream Tower	1	13	China	2018	Bilibili iQIYI	CGI
Dungeon Quest	3	120	United States	2018-21	Cartoon Network	Traditional
Eager Beaver		77	Russia	2018	Carousel	CGI
Egg Goog	2	26	South Korea	2018–19	SBS TV	CGI
Ella, Oscar & Hoo		52	Canada; Finland; France; Germany	2018–present	Piwi+	Flash
The Epic Tales of Captain Underpants	4	45	United States	2018–20	Netflix	Flash
Esme & Roy	2	52	Canada; United States	2018–21	HBO; Treehouse TV; HBO Max	Flash
Esther's Notebooks	3	159	France	2018–20	Canal+	Flash
Fancy Nancy	3	63	United States	2018–22	Disney Junior	CGI
Los Fantásticos Viajes de Ruka	2		Chile, Colombia	2018	TVN; Señal Colombia	Flash
Fei Ren Zai	2	120	China	2018–present	Tencent Video	CGI
Final Space	3	36	Canada; United States	2018–21	TBS (season 1); Adult Swim (seasons 2–3)	Flash
The Five Elves: A Magical Journey	1	12	Malaysia	2018	Astro Xiao Tai Yang	CGI
The Fox Badger Family	2	104	France	2018	France 5	CGI
Furiki Wheels	1	52	France	2018	Disney XD	Flash
Gary and His Demons	2	26	Canada; United States	2018–22	VRV; Amazon Prime Video	Flash
Go Away, Unicorn!	1	26	United States; Canada	2018–19	YTV; Disney Channel	Toon Boom Harmony
GooGoo & GaaGaa		26	United States	2018	BabyFirst	CGI/Flash
Gormiti	3	79	Italy; Spain	2018–21	Boing; Rai Gulp; Rai Yoyo	CGI
Guan Hai Ce	2	32	China	2018–20	Tencent Video	CGI
Gyrocar	1	30	China	2018		
Harvey Girls Forever!	4	52	United States	2018–20	Netflix	Traditional
Heavies tendres	1	8	Spain	2018	El 33	
Hilda	3	34	Canada; United Kingdom; United States	2018–23	Netflix	Flash
Hit Hard, Hara!	2	20	Chile; France	2018–22	Cartoon Network	
The Hollow	2	20	Canada	2018–20	Netflix	Flash
Holy Light	8	144	United States; Australia; Canada	2018–Present	TBS; 9Go!	Traditional/Flash
Human Kind Of	1	21	United States	2018	Facebook Watch	Flash
Inspector Chingum	2	52	India	2018	Amazon Prime Video	CGI
The Invasion of Awakening	3	52	China	2018–21	Tencent Video	CGI
Jurassic Cops	2	79	South Korea	2018–present	KBS1; MBC TV	CGI
Kicko & Super Speedo			India	2018	Sony YAY!	CGI
Kiddets	1	52	New Zealand	2018–2019	TVNZ	CGI/Live action
Kiddyzuzaa Land	2	20	United Kingdom	2018–19	YouTube	Flash
Kiko Mini Series		46	Indonesia	2018–19	RCTI	CGI
Kit & Pup	1	52	United Kingdom	2018	CBeebies	Flash/Live action
Kitty Is Not a Cat	3	130	Australia	2018–20	7TWO	Flash
Klump	1	26	Denmark; Germany; United Kingdom	2018	KiKa	CGI
Kuku Mey Mey	1	78	India	2018	Amazon Prime Video; Toon Goggles	Flash
Kung Fu Panda: The Paws of Destiny	1	26	United States	2018–19	Amazon Prime Video	CGI
Lale Ki Lolu	1	26	Germany	2018–present	BabyTV	CGI
Legend of the Three Caballeros	1	13	United States	2018	DisneyLife; Disney+	Flash
Lego Star Wars: All-Stars	1	5	United States	2018	Disney XD	CGI
Let's Go Luna!	2	65	Canada; United States	2018–22	PBS Kids; TVOKids	Flash
Lilybuds	1	53	France; United Kingdom; Canada; Italy	2018–19	Discovery Kids; France 5	CGI
Little Big Awesome	1	13	United States	2018	Amazon Prime Video	Traditional
Little Hero Super Z	3	78	South Korea	2018–present	EBS1; YouTube; Ocon	CGI
Little Malabar	2	52	France; Italy	2018–present	France 5	Flash
Little Singham	3	410	India	2018–present	Discovery Kids	Flash
Little Tiaras	3	78	Russia	2018–present	STS Kids	CGI
Littlest Pet Shop: A World of Our Own	1	52	United States	2018–19	Discovery Family	Flash
Liverspots and Astronots	1	21	United States	2018	Facebook Watch	Flash
Llama Llama	2	25	United States	2018–19	Netflix	Flash
Lola and Mila	1	10	Serbia	2018	Pikaboo	Flash
Love Story of Cat Spirit	1	20	China	2018–19	Bilibili iQIYI; Tencent Video; Youku	CGI
Luo Bao Bei	1	52	China; United Kingdom	2018	ABC Kids; Milkshake!	Flash
Manger Bouger Dormir	2	12	France; Canada	2018–21	Gulli; M6; France 3 TFOU; France 5 Disney Channel; France 4	Flash
Marblegen	1	26	France; Italy; United States	2018–19	TFOU; Canal J	Flash
Marvel Rising: Initiation	1	6	United States	2018	Disney XD	Traditional
Mashimaro	3	210	China; South Korea	2018–20	iQIYI	CGI
Max & Maestro	1	52	France; Germany; Italy; Canada; United States	2018	France 4 Rai Gulp; KiKa	
Mega Man: Fully Charged	1	52	Canada; United States	2018–19	Cartoon Network; Family Chrgd	CGI
The Microadventures of Tito & Muda	1	78	Brazil	2018	TV Cultura	
Mo Dao Zu Shi	3	35	China	2018–21	Tencent Video	Traditional
Le monde selon Kev	1	52	France	2018	M6	
Monta in the Odd Galaxy	1	40	Vietnam	2018–19	YouTube	Traditional
MooseBox	1	20	South Africa	2018	Nicktoons	Toon Boom Harmony
Moriki Doriki	1	13	Russia	2018–20		CGI
Motown Magic	2	51	Australia; United States	2018–19	Netflix	CGI
Mr. Theo, Cat & Dog	5	120	Russia	2018–present	Carousel	Traditional
Muppet Babies (2018)	3	71	United States	2018–22	Disney Junior	CGI
Muralzinho	1	13	Brazil	2018	TV Brasil	
My Animal Friends with Robi		24	United States	2018	BabyFirst	Flash/Live action
My Friend Koriri	1	26	South Korea	2018–19	SBS TV	CGI
My Holy Weapon	1	16	China	2018	Tencent Video	Traditional
Mya Go	3	156	Ireland; Spain; France	2018–present	RTÉjr; Super3	Flash
Nate Is Late	3	156	France; Australia (season 1)	2018–present	France 4 France 3 Canal J 9Go! Super RTL (Germany); Ketnet (Belgium)	Flash
No-No	1	52	France	2018–present	Piwi+	CGI
Nomad of Nowhere	1	12	United States	2018	RoosterTeeth.com	
(not) Hero	1	3	United States	2018	VRV	Flash
Nussa	3	74	Indonesia	2018–21	YouTube	CGI
Orange Moo-Cow	5	130	Russia	2018–present	O!	Flash
Our Cartoon President	3	46	United States	2018–20	Showtime	Flash
Pandarang	2	52	South Korea	2018–19	MBC TV	
Paradise PD	4	40	United States	2018–22	Netflix	Flash/Traditional
Peek Zoo	1	26	Ireland	2018–20	RTÉjr	Flash
Peepoodo & the Super Fuck Friends	2	26	France	2018–21	Blackpills	Flash
Petit	4		Argentina; Chile; Colombia	2018	Pakapaka	
Ping and Friends	1	52	Brazil; Canada; France	2018–19	TVOKids	Flash
Pinkalicious & Peterrific	7	81	United States	2018–25	PBS Kids	Flash
Pipi Mā	5	56	New Zealand	2018	Māori Television	Flash
Pirate School	1	11	Russia	2018–20	Multimania	Flash
The Plantons	1	53	Israel	2018	Kan Educational	CGI
Polly Pocket	6	155	Canada; United States	2018–25	Family Channel	Flash
The Psammy Show	1	52	France; Germany; India	2018–19	Disney Channel	CGI
Psychic Princess	1	16	China	2018–19	Bilibili iQIYI; Tencent Video; Youku	
Rainbow Rangers	3	62	United States; Ireland	2018–22	Nick Jr. Channel	CGI (seasons 1–2); Flash (season 3)
ReBoot: The Guardian Code	2	20	Canada	2018	Netflix (International); YTV	CGI/Live action
Rise of the Teenage Mutant Ninja Turtles	2	39	United States	2018–20	Nickelodeon	Traditional
Robozuna	2	40	United Kingdom	2018–20	CITV	CGI
Rudra: Boom Chik Chik Boom	7	157	India	2018–present	Nickelodeon	CGI
Scissor Seven	5	50	China	2018–present	Bilibili iQIYI; Tencent Video; Youku	
Semi and the Magic Cube	2	52	South Korea	2018–20	EBS1	
Senninha na Pista Maluca	2	26	Brazil	2018–20	Gloobinho	
Shan He She Ji Tu	1	20	China	2018–19	Bilibili iQIYI; Tencent Video; Youku	CGI
Shane the Chef		52	United Kingdom	2018	Milkshake!	CGI
She-Ra and the Princesses of Power	5	52	United States	2018–20	Netflix	Traditional
Shenbing Kids 2	1	52	China	2018	CCTV-14	CGI
The Shivering Truth	2	12	United States	2018–20	Adult Swim	Stop motion
The Silver iOn Squad	1	18	Vietnam	2018	YouTube	Flash
Simple Samosa		104	India	2018–present	Disney Channel	Flash
Slug Riot	1	5	United States	2018	VRV	Flash
Snowsnaps	1	26	Canada	2018	Télétoon; Treehouse TV	CGI
Space Chickens in Space	1	26	Australia; Ireland; Mexico; United Kingdom	2018–19	9Go! Disney XD	Flash
Spy Kids: Mission Critical	2	20	Canada; United States	2018	Netflix	CGI
Star Key	1	26	Italy	2018	Rai Gulp	
Star Wars Galaxy of Adventures	2	54	United States	2018–20	YouTube	
Star Wars Resistance	2	40	United States	2018–20	Disney Channel	CGI
Stellar Transformation	5	80	China	2018–present	Tencent Video	CGI
Subway Surfers: The Animated Series	1	11	United States	2018–19	YouTube	Flash
Sugar Skulls	1	10	Mexico	2018	Discovery Kids	CGI
Summer Camp Island	6	120	United States	2018–23	Cartoon Network; HBO Max	Traditional
Super Agent Jon Le Bon! How to Save the World in 90 Seconds	2	49	Canada	2018	TFO	Flash
Super Dinosaur	1	26	Canada; United States	2018–19	Teletoon	CGI
Super Drags	1	5	Brazil	2018	Netflix	Flash
Taffy	2	156	France	2018–24	France 4 (season 1); Gulli; Canal J (season 2)	Flash
Taina and the Amazon's Guardians	1	26	Brazil	2018–19	Nickelodeon	CGI
Tee and Mo	2	70	Canada; United Kingdom	2018–19	CBeebies	Flash
Three Squirrels	1	52	China	2018		CGI
Tigtone	2	20	United States	2018–20	Adult Swim	CGI
Time to Rock	1	26	Brazil	2018–19	Globoplay	
Tinpo	2	78	Japan; United Kingdom	2018–19	CBeebies; TV Tokyo	CGI
Titipo Titipo	3	78	South Korea	2018–22	EBS	CGI
Tobot: Galaxy Detectives	3	152	South Korea	2018–21	KBS2; Tooniverse	CGI
Tomato Doppi			Uzbekistan	2018	Milliy TV	CGI
Total DramaRama	3	152	Canada; United States	2018–23	Teletoon; Cartoon Network	Flash
Transformers: Cyberverse	4	64	United States; Ireland	2018–21	Cartoon Network (seasons 1–3); Netflix (season 4); YouTube	CGI
Transformers: Power of the Primes	1	10	United States	2018	go90	CGI
Transformers: Rescue Bots Academy	2	104	United States; Ireland	2018–21	Discovery Family	Flash
Treasure X	3	15		2018–19	YouTube	
Treehouse Detectives	2	20	South Korea; United States	2018	Netflix	CGI
Trolls: The Beat Goes On!	8	52	United States	2018–19	Netflix	Traditional
Uncharted Walker	1	12	China	2018	Bilibili	
Vermin	1	10	France	2018	Blackpills	
Virtual Hero	2	18	Spain	2018–20	Movistar+	
The Vloggingtons	2	41	New Zealand	2018–21	HeiHei	Flash
Watership Down	1	4	United Kingdom; Ireland; United States	2018	BBC One; Netflix (International)	CGI
Weki Meki	4	72	United States	2018-21	Hulu	Flash
The Westward	5	70+	China	2018–present	Tencent Video	CGI
Wolf	2	156	France; Italy	2018	TFOU	Flash
Wolfoo	17	1,378	Vietnam	2018–present	YouTube	Flash
Woody Woodpecker	3	30	United States	2018–22	YouTube	Flash
Youths and Golden Coffin	3	58+	China	2018–present	Bilibili iQIYI	CGI
Zafari	2	52	Canada; United States	2018–present	TiJi	CGI
Zak Jinks	2	104	France	2018	France 3 Okoo	
Zuzubaland	4	52	Brazil	2018–present	Boomerang	Flash

== See also ==
- 2018 in animation
- 2018 in anime
- List of animated feature films of 2018
