= 2018 in animation =

2018 in animation is an overview of notable events, including notable awards, list of films released, television show debuts and endings, and notable deaths.

== Events ==
=== January ===
- January 1: Unikitty! makes its official premiere on Cartoon Network.
- January 5: The 6th and final season of The Amazing World of Gumball begins on Cartoon Network, with the premiere of the episodes "The Rival/The Lady".
- January 6: The Scooby-Doo film Scooby-Doo! & Batman: The Brave and the Bold premieres at the TCL Chinese Theatre in Los Angeles, California; the film was released on DVD & Digital HD 3 days later.
- January 14: Family Guy's 300th episode "Dog Bites Bear" premieres on Fox. It was seen by exactly 4.1 million viewers that night.
- January 15: The Amazing World of Gumball's 200th episode "The Vegging" premieres on Cartoon Network. It was seen by 1.14 million viewers that night.
- January 19: Season 3 of The Loud House begins on Nickelodeon with the premiere of the episodes "Roadie to Nowhere/A Fridge Too Far". The season's premiere was seen by over 1.7 million viewers that night.
- January 22: Minnie Mouse receives a star at the Hollywood Walk of Fame.
- January 30: Nick Jr. celebrates its 30th anniversary.

=== February ===
- February 3: 45th Annie Awards.
- February 6: Season 5 of Paw Patrol begins on Nickelodeon in the US with the premiere of the episodes "Pups Save the Kitty Rescue Crew/Pups Save an Ostrich".
- February 17: Paw Patrol concludes its fourth season on TVO in Canada with the episodes "Pups Save the Runaway Turtles/Pups Save the Shivering Sheep".
- February 23:
  - Disney Channel greenlights two new serialized animated shows for its network, Amphibia & The Owl House.
  - The upcoming 4th season of Star vs. the Forces of Evil was announced to be also airing on Disney Channel & not just Disney XD.
- February 26: The first episode of Final Space airs.

=== March ===
- March 3: 38th Golden Raspberry Awards
  - Sony Pictures Animation's The Emoji Movie wins a record four Razzie awards, including Worst Picture, becoming the first animated film to win it.
- March 4: 90th Academy Awards:
  - Dear Basketball by Glen Keane wins the Academy Award for Best Animated Short Film.
  - Coco by Walt Disney Pictures and Pixar wins the Academy Award for Best Animated Feature and Academy Award for Best Original Song.
- March 6: Paw Patrol concludes its fourth season on Nickelodeon in the US with the episodes "Pups Save Luke Stars/Pups Save Chicken Day".
- March 8: Cartoon Network announces the following:
  - Two new upcoming shows for its line-up: Infinity Train & Victor and Valentino.
  - Season 3 renewal for Ben 10.
  - Season 4 renewal for We Bare Bears.
- March 19: Season 2 of OK K.O.! Let's Be Heroes begins its second season on Cartoon Network (ahead of its season one finale) with the episodes "Hope This Flies" and "The Perfect Meal". Both episodes were seen by a total of 66 thousand viewers thousand viewers that night.
- March 26: The upcoming Disney XD series Big City Greens was announced to instead be premiering on Disney Channel this summer.
- March 29: John Kricfalusi is accused by animators Robyn Byrd and Katie Rice of having sexually harassed and groomed them when they were underage.
- March 30: Craig of the Creek makes its premiere on Cartoon Network (Originally premiered on the Cartoon Network website on February 19).

=== April ===
- April 6: OK K.O.! Let's Be Heroes concludes it first season on Cartoon Network with the half-hour special "You're in Control". The season's finale was seen by a total of 80 thousand viewers that night.
- April 7: Season 5 of Paw Patrol begins on TVO in Canada with the premiere of the episodes "Pups Save the Kitty Rescue Crew/Pups Save an Ostrich".
- April 27: The Simpsons beats Gunsmoke's record of being the longest-running American primetime TV series.

=== May ===
- May 7: The Steven Universe two-part special episodes "Can't Go Back/A Single Pale Rose" premiered on Cartoon Network. It is revealed that Rose Quartz was secretly Pink Diamond all this time, in which fans previously theorized that to be the case.
- May 11: John Kricfalusi issues a personal explanation and apology about the sexual assault allegations against him, though he denies some of the claims.
- May 17: The upcoming Disney Channel animated series Big City Greens gets renewed for a second season, just a month before the show made its premiere.
- May 20:
  - The Simpsons concludes its 29th season on Fox with the episode "Flanders' Ladder", Jackie Mason returns as Krusty's deceased father, Rabbi Hyman Krustofsky. The season's finale was seen by exactly 2.1 million viewers that night.
  - Family Guy concludes its 16th season on Fox with the episode "Are You There God? Its Me, Peter". The season's finale was seen by over 1.8 million viewers that night.
  - Bob's Burgers concludes its eighth season on Fox with its 150th episode "Something Old, Something New, Something Bob Caters for You". The season's finale was seen by over 1.6 million viewers that night.

=== June ===
- June 3: The first episode of Fancy Nancy airs.
- June 11: Nina Paley's animated feature film Seder-Masochism premieres, which analyses the Book of Exodus and evolution of Judaism as a patriarchal religion.
- June 15: Incredibles 2 premieres in theaters to overwhelmingly positive reviews.
- June 18: Big City Greens premieres on Disney Channel with the episodes "Space Chicken/Steak Night".
- June 24: The final episodes of Clarence premiere on Cartoon Network.
- June 25: Teen Titans Go! concludes its fourth season on Cartoon Network with the episodes "Mo' Money Mo' Problems" & "TV Knight 3" and then begins its fifth season the same day with the episodes "The Scoop!" & "Chicken in the Cradle".
- June 29:
  - Production companies permanently ceased making direct-to-video sequels based on theatrical canon films due to harmed sales as subsequent sequels will be released theatrically and for digital streaming.
  - Harvey Girls Forever! premieres on Netflix.

=== July ===
- July 7: The first episode of Summer Camp Island airs.
- July 8: Incredibles 2 surpasses Finding Dory as the highest-grossing animated film in the United States and Canada, with a domestic box-office gross of $500 million.
- July 16: The Big City Greens episodes "Gargoyle Gals/Supermarket Scandal" premiere on Disney Channel; the former episode marks the debut of Tilly's best friend Andromeda, while the latter episode marks the debut of the Greens' arch-nemesis Chip Whistler.
- July 20:
  - Rise of the Teenage Mutant Ninja Turtles premieres on Nickelodeon.
  - The Adventure Time episode "Diamonds and Lemons" premieres on Cartoon Network, the episode is styled after the popular video game Minecraft.
- July 27: Teen Titans Go! To the Movies premieres in theaters to very positive reviews, which was surprisingly ironic due to the controversial reception of the series it is based on gets.

=== August ===
- August 8: The Big City Greens episodes "Coffee Quest/Phoenix Rises" premiere on Disney Channel, the latter episode marks the debut of Nancy Green, Cricket & Tilly's mother.
- August 17: The first episode of Disenchantment airs on Netflix.
- August 23: The first episode of Wolfoo airs on YouTube.
- August 28: The Scooby-Doo direct-to-video film Scooby-Doo! and the Gourmet Ghost releases on Digital HD, later released on DVD on September 11. The movie stars real life celebrity chefs such as Bobby Flay, Giada De Laurentiis, & Marcus Samuelsson.

=== September ===
- September 1: Total DramaRama premieres on Cartoon Network.
- September 3: Adventure Time airs its final episode on Cartoon Network, after an 8-year run.
- September 5: Luke Lerdwichagul (creator of SMG4) and his brother Kevin announced that their company "Glitchy Boy" is being renamed as "Glitch Productions", and will be producing animated web shows.
- September 7: Kevin R. Adams and Joe Ksander's Next Gen premiers and becomes the first full-length animated feature film to be released exclusively on Netflix.
- September 14: Season 5 of BoJack Horseman premiered on Netflix.
- September 21: The first episode of Hilda airs on Netflix.
- September 26: Season 22 of South Park begins on Comedy Central with the premiere of the episode "Dead Kids".
- September 28: Smallfoot by Karey Kirkpatrick premieres.
- September 30:
  - Season 30 of The Simpsons begins on Fox with the premiere of the episode "Bart's Not Dead", which features the following guest stars: Dave Attell, Emily Deschanel, Gal Gadot, Jonathan Groff, and Pete Holmes. The season's premiere was seen by over 3.2 million viewers that night.
  - Season 9 of Bob's Burgers begins on Fox with the premiere of the episode "Just One of the Boyz 4 Now for Now", which features the following guest stars: Max Greenfield, Rory O'Malley, Josh Gad, Andrew Rannells, and Daveed Diggs. The season's premiere was seen by over 2.4 million viewers that night.
  - Season 17 of Family Guy begins on Fox with the premiere of the episode "Married... with Cancer", Casey Wilson guest stars as Brian's temporary fiancé Jess. The season's premiere was seen by over 2.5 million viewers that night.

=== October ===
- October 1: The first episode of Bluey premieres on ABC Kids in Australia to universal critical acclaim.
- October 5: Season 2 of Big Mouth premiered on Netflix.
- October 7: The Family Guy episode "Dead Dog Walking" premieres on Fox, the episode follows up from the events from Married... with Cancer". The episode was seen by nearly 2.7 million viewers that night.
- October 8: The OK K.O.! Let's Be Heroes episode "Crossover Nexus" premieres on Cartoon Network. The episode features K.O. teaming up with Garnet from Steven Universe, Ben Tennyson from Ben 10, and Raven from Teen Titans Go!.
- October 19: The rest of the first season of Hilda airs on Netflix.
- October 26: Film producer Adi Shankar states in an interview with IndieWire that he heard that the character Apu Nahasapeemapetilon will leave The Simpsons following controversy over him potentially being a negative and racially offensive stereotype.
- October 29: The Simpsons executive producer Al Jean states that Adi Shankar "does not speak for our show".

=== November ===
- November 9: Illumination's The Grinch premieres, receiving mixed to poor attention due to the lack of the original source material.
- November 13: She-Ra and the Princesses of Power is released on Netflix.
- November 21:
  - Ralph Breaks the Internet is released, being the first theatrical Walt Disney Animation Studios sequel since The Jungle Book 2 in 2003, which had since denied subsequent theatrical sequels for 15 years.
  - Let's Go Luna airs its first episode on PBS Kids.
- November 30: Season 3 of F Is for Family premieres on Netflix.

=== December ===
- December 12:
  - Cinderella and Hair Piece: A Film for Nappyheaded People are added to the National Film Registry.
  - South Park concludes its 22nd season on Comedy Central with the episode "Bike Parade". It was seen by only 83 hundred thousand viewers that night, marking another low in the show's viewership premieres.
- December 14: Sony Pictures Animation's Spider-Man: Into the Spider-Verse is released.

== Awards ==
- Academy Award for Best Animated Feature: Coco
- Academy Award for Best Animated Short Film: Dear Basketball
- American Cinema Editors Award for Best Edited Animated Feature Film: Coco
- Annecy International Animated Film Festival Cristal du long métrage: Funan
- Annie Award for Best Animated Feature: Coco
- Annie Award for Best Animated Feature — Independent: Mirai
- Asia Pacific Screen Award for Best Animated Feature Film: Rezo
- BAFTA Award for Best Animated Film: Spider-Man: Into the Spider-Verse
- César Award for Best Animated Film: Dilili in Paris
- Chicago Film Critics Association Award for Best Animated Film: Spider-Man: Into the Spider-Verse
- Critics' Choice Movie Award for Best Animated Feature: Spider-Man: Into the Spider-Verse
- Dallas–Fort Worth Film Critics Association Award for Best Animated Film: Isle of Dogs
- European Film Award for Best Animated Feature Film: Another Day of Life
- Florida Film Critics Circle Award for Best Animated Film: Mirai
- Golden Globe Award for Best Animated Feature Film: Spider-Man: Into the Spider-Verse
- Golden Reel Award for Animated Feature Film: Spider-Man: Into the Spider-Verse
- Goya Award for Best Animated Film: Another Day of Life
- Hollywood Animation Award: Incredibles 2
- Japan Academy Film Prize for Animation of the Year: The Night Is Short, Walk On Girl
- Kids' Choice Award for Favorite Animated Movie: Incredibles 2
- Los Angeles Film Critics Association Award for Best Animated Film: Spider-Man: Into the Spider-Verse
- Mainichi Film Award for Best Animation Film: Okko's Inn
- National Board of Review Award for Best Animated Film: Incredibles 2
- New York Film Critics Circle Award for Best Animated Film: Spider-Man: Into the Spider-Verse
- Online Film Critics Society Award for Best Animated Film: Spider-Man: Into the Spider-Verse
- Producers Guild of America Award for Best Animated Motion Picture: Spider-Man: Into the Spider-Verse
- San Diego Film Critics Society Award for Best Animated Film: Isle of Dogs
- San Francisco Film Critics Circle Award for Best Animated Feature: Spider-Man: Into the Spider-Verse
- Satellite Award for Best Animated or Mixed Media Feature: Isle of Dogs
- Saturn Award for Best Animated Film: Spider-Man: Into the Spider-Verse (note: the 2018/2019 events were combined; films released in both years were eligible)
- St. Louis Gateway Film Critics Association Award for Best Animated Film: Spider-Man: Into the Spider-Verse
- Tokyo Anime Award: In This Corner of the World and Kemono Friends
- Toronto Film Critics Association Award for Best Animated Film: Isle of Dogs
- Visual Effects Society Award for Outstanding Visual Effects in an Animated Feature: Spider-Man: Into the Spider-Verse
- Washington D.C. Area Film Critics Association Award for Best Animated Feature: Isle of Dogs

== Television series debuts ==
Date	Title	Channel	Year
January 7	Cleo & Cuquin	Clan	2018
January 14	Hot Streets	Adult Swim	2018–2019
January 15	The Adventures of Kid Danger	Nickelodeon	2018
January 19	Trolls: The Beat Goes On!	Netflix	2018–2019
January 19	Constantine: City of Demons	CW Seed	2018–2019
January 26	Llama Llama	Netflix	2018–2019
February 11	Our Cartoon President	Showtime	2018–2020
February 19	Pinkalicious & Peterrific	PBS Kids	2018–2025
February 23	Apple & Onion	Cartoon Network	2018–2021
February 26	Final Space	TBS, Adult Swim	2018–2021
March 2	B: The Beginning	Netflix	2018–present
March 23	Muppet Babies (2018)	Disney Junior	2018–2022
March 24	Pokémon the Series: Sun & Moon – Ultra Adventures	Disney XD	2018–2019
March 30	Craig of the Creek	Cartoon Network	2018–2025
April 6	The Boss Baby: Back in Business	Netflix	2018–2020
April 8	Ballmastrz: 9009	Adult Swim	2018–2020
April 14	Littlest Pet Shop: A World of Our Own	Discovery Family	2018–2019
April 20	Spy Kids: Mission Critical	Netflix	2018
April 26	Little Big Awesome	Amazon Prime Video	2018
May 11	The Adventures of Rocky and Bullwinkle	Amazon Prime Video	2018–2019
June 1	Subway Surfers: The Animated Series	YouTube	2018–present
June 8	The Hollow	Netflix	2018–2020
June 18	Big City Greens	Disney Channel	2018–present
June 29	Harvey Girls Forever!	Netflix	2018–2020
July 1	Pop Team Epic	Adult Swim	2018
July 1	Polly Pocket	Universal Kids	2018–2022
July 7	Summer Camp Island	Cartoon Network, HBO Max	2018–2023
July 13	Fancy Nancy	Disney Junior	2018–2022
July 13	The Epic Tales of Captain Underpants	Netflix	2018–2020
July 20	Rise of the Teenage Mutant Ninja Turtles	Nickelodeon, Nicktoons	2018–2020
July 27	Cupcake & Dino: General Services	Netflix	2018–2019
August 5	Mega Man: Fully Charged	Cartoon Network	2018–2019
August 17	Disenchantment	Netflix	2018–2023
August 18	Esme & Roy	HBO/Treehouse TV	2018–2021
August 21	16 Hudson	TVOkids	2018–present
September 1	Total DramaRama	Cartoon Network	2018–2023
September 1	Transformers: Cyberverse	Cartoon Network	2018–2020
September 14	The Dragon Prince	Netflix	2018–2024
September 16	Human Kind Of	Facebook Watch	2018
September 21	Hilda	Netflix	2018–2023
September 21	Pete the Cat	Amazon Prime Video	2018–2022
October 1	Bluey	ABC Kids (Australia); Disney Jr. (United States)	2018–2024
October 7	Star Wars Resistance	Disney Channel	2018–2020
October 18	Robozuna	Netflix	2018–2020
October 18	Liverspots and Astronots	Facebook Watch	2018
November 5	Rainbow Rangers	Nick Jr.	2018–2022
November 9	Super Drags	Netflix	2018
November 12	Butterbean's Cafe	Nick Jr.	2018–2020
November 13	She-Ra and the Princesses of Power	Netflix	2018–2020
November 16	Kung Fu Panda: The Paws of Destiny	Amazon Prime Video	2018–2019
November 20	Motown Magic	Netflix	2018–2019
November 21	Let's Go Luna!	PBS Kids	2018–2022
December 9	The Shivering Truth	Adult Swim	2018–2020
December 11	44 Cats	Nick Jr.	2018–2021
December 21	3Below: Tales of Arcadia	Netflix	2018–2019
December 22	Watership Down	Netflix	2018
December 23	Bakugan: Battle Planet	Cartoon Network, Teletoon	2018–present
December 31	Abby Hatcher	Nick Jr.	2018–2022

== Television series endings ==
Date	Title	Channel	Year	Notes
January 20	Pickle and Peanut	Disney XD	2015–2018	Cancelled
January 26	The Adventures of Puss in Boots	Netflix	2015–2018	Ended
February 10	Bunsen Is a Beast	Nicktoons	2017–2018	Cancelled
February 16	DreamWorks Dragons	Netflix	2012–2018	Cancelled
March 5	Star Wars Rebels	Disney XD	2014–2018	Ended
March 18	Be Cool, Scooby-Doo!	Boomerang	2015–2018	Ended
April 23	Peg + Cat	PBS Kids	2013–2018	Ended
May 4	Kong: King of the Apes	Netflix	2016–2018	Cancelled
May 18	Inspector Gadget (2015)	Netflix, Universal Kids	2015–2018	Cancelled
May 19	Future-Worm!	Disney XD	2016–2018	Ended
May 25	Trollhunters	Netflix	2016–2018	Ended
June 3	Justice League Action	Cartoon Network	2016–2018	Ended
June 14	The Adventures of Kid Danger	Nickelodeon	2018	Ended
June 24	Clarence	Cartoon Network	2014–2018	Ended
July 20	Home: Adventures with Tip & Oh	Netflix	2016–2018	Ended
August 3	Dinotrux	Netflix	2015–2018	Ended
August 6	Splash and Bubbles	PBS Kids	2016–2018	Ended
August 11	Pig Goat Banana Cricket	Nicktoons	2015–2018	Ended
September 1	Brawl Of the Objects	YouTube	2013–2018	Ended
September 3	Adventure Time	Cartoon Network	2010–2018	Ended
September 7	Stretch Armstrong and the Flex Fighters	Netflix	2017–2018	Cancelled
September 8	Sofia the First	Disney Junior	2013–2018	Ended
September 10	Miles from Tomorrowland	Disney Junior	2015–2018	Ended
September 15	Mysticons	Nicktoons	2017–2018	Ended
September 23	Pop Team Epic	Adult Swim	2018	Cancelled
September 28	Skylanders Academy	Netflix	2016–2018	Ended
October 1	Goldie & Bear	Disney Junior	2015–2018	Ended
October 5	Animals	HBO	2016–2018	Ended
October 7	The Venture Bros.	Adult Swim	2003–2018	Cancelled
October 12	Tarzan and Jane	Netflix	2017–2018	Ended
October 14	The Cat in the Hat Knows a Lot About That!	PBS Kids	2010–2018	Ended
October 28	Human Kind Of	Facebook Watch	2018	Ended
November 9	Super Drags	Netflix	2018	Cancelled
November 9	Beat Bugs	Netflix	2016–2018	Ended
November 20	Kulipari	Netflix	2016–2018	Ended
November 22	Space Racers	Universal Kids	2014–2018	Ended
November 29	Liverspots and Astronots	Facebook Watch	2018	Ended
December 7	Neo Yokio	Netflix	2017–2018	Cancelled
December 14	Voltron: Legendary Defender	Netflix	2016–2018	Ended
December 21	Mike Judge Presents: Tales from the Tour Bus	Cinemax	2017–2018	Cancelled
December 23	Watership Down	Netflix	2018	Ended
December 27	DC Super Hero Girls	YouTube	2015–2018	Ended
December 30	Bob the Builder (2015)	PBS Kids	2015–2018	Ended
December 30	Bunnicula	Boomerang	2016–2018	Ended

== Television season premieres ==
Date	Title	Season	Channel, Streaming
January 5	The Amazing World of Gumball	6	Cartoon Network
January 19	The Loud House	3	Nickelodeon
February 6	Paw Patrol	5	Nickelodeon (Note: Season later premiered in Canada on TVO on April 7th.)
February 19	Ben 10 (2016)	2	Cartoon Network
March 19	OK K.O.! Let's Be Heroes	2	Cartoon Network
April 8	The Powerpuff Girls (2016)	3	Cartoon Network
April 30	Mighty Magiswords	2	Cartoon Network
June 25	Teen Titans Go!	5	Cartoon Network
July 30	We Bare Bears	4	Cartoon Network
September 14	BoJack Horseman	5	Netflix
September 26	South Park	22	Comedy Central
September 30	Bob's Burgers	9	Fox
September 30	Family Guy	17	Fox
September 30	The Simpsons	30	Fox
October 5	Big Mouth	2	Netflix
October 6	Mickey Mouse	5	Disney Channel
October 20	DuckTales (2017)	2	Disney Channel
November 11	SpongeBob SquarePants	12	Nickelodeon
November 30	F Is for Family	3	Netflix

== Television season finales ==
Date	Title	Season	Channel, Streaming
February 16	We Bare Bears	3	Cartoon Network
February 17	Paw Patrol	4	TVO (Note: Season later concluded in the US on Nickelodeon on March 6th.)
April 6	OK K.O.! Let's Be Heroes	1	Cartoon Network
April 7	Star vs. the Forces of Evil	3	Disney XD
April 29	Mighty Magiswords	1	Cartoon Network
May 13	The Powerpuff Girls (2016)	2	Cartoon Network
May 20	Bob's Burgers	8	Fox
May 20	Family Guy	16	Fox
May 20	The Simpsons	29	Fox
June 25	Teen Titans Go!	4	Cartoon Network
July 14	Mickey Mouse	4	Disney Channel
August 18	DuckTales (2017)	1	Disney Channel
September 14	BoJack Horseman	5	Netflix
September 21	Hilda	1	Netflix
October 5	Big Mouth	2	Netflix
November 25	SpongeBob SquarePants	11	Nickelodeon
November 30	F Is for Family	3	Netflix
December 12	South Park	22	Comedy Central

== Deaths ==
=== January ===
- January 2: Frank Buxton, American actor (voice of the title character in Batfink), dies at age 87.
- January 7: Doug Young, American actor (voice of Doggie Daddy in The Quick Draw McGraw Show, Ding-A-Ling Wolf in The Huckleberry Hound Show, Yippee in The Peter Potamus Show), dies at age 98.
- January 27: Jim McLean, American animator and storyboard artist (Warner Bros. Animation, Disney Television Animation, He-Man and the Masters of the Universe, Denver, the Last Dinosaur, BraveStarr, Spider-Man), dies at age 67.
- January 28: Cav Bøgelund, Danish animator and comics artist (Våbenbrødre), drowns at age 39 in mysterious circumstances.
- January 31: Ann Gillis, American actress (voice of Faline in Bambi), dies at age 90.

=== February ===
- February 2: Servais Tiago, Portuguese comics artist and animator, dies at age 92.
- February 4: John Mahoney, English-American actor (voice of Grebs in Antz, Preston Whitmore in Atlantis: The Lost Empire and Atlantis: Milo's Return, General Rogard in The Iron Giant, Papi in Kronk's New Groove, Robert Terwilliger in The Simpsons episode "Funeral for a Fiend"), dies at age 77.
- February 9: Reg E. Cathey, American actor (voice of Captain Quaid in Rapunzel's Tangled Adventure), dies at age 59.
- February 10: Ginger Tam, American musician (did the backing vocals from VeggieTales), dies at age 56.
- February 24: Bud Luckey, American animator, composer (Walt Disney Animation Studios, Pixar, Sesame Street) and actor (voice of Rick Dicker in The Incredibles, Chuckles in Toy Story 3, Eeyore in Winnie the Pooh), dies at age 83.
- February 26: Benjamin Melniker, American film and television producer (Warner Bros. Animation, Where on Earth Is Carmen Sandiego?, Fish Police, Dinosaucers), dies at age 104.
- February 27: Bill Lignante, American comics artist, courtroom sketch artist and animator (Hanna-Barbera), dies at age 91.

=== March ===
- March 1: Pete Henderson, American comedian (voice of Monkeys in The Jungle Book), dies at age 79.
- March 3: David Ogden Stiers, American actor (voice of Cogsworth in the Beauty and the Beast franchise and House of Mouse, Ratcliffe and Wiggins in Pocahontas, Archdeacon in The Hunchback of Notre Dame, Jumba Jookiba in the Lilo & Stitch franchise, Narrator in Winnie the Pooh: Springtime with Roo and Pooh's Heffalump Halloween Movie, Mr. Jolly, Narrator and Congressman in Teacher's Pet, Narrator and Crew Man in the American Dragon: Jake Long episode "The Talented Mr. Long", Nicky Flippers in Hoodwinked! and Hoodwinked Too! Hood vs. Evil, VLAD in 101 Dalmatians: The Series, Byron Beaver in The Angry Beavers, Solovar in the DC Animated Universe, Dr. Odium in the Static Shock episode "Hoop Squad", Karroo in The Wild Thornberrys episode "Luck Be an Aye-Aye"), dies at age 75.
- March 14: Stephen Hawking, English theoretical physicist, cosmologist and author (voiced himself in The Simpsons episodes "They Saved Lisa's Brain", "Don't Fear the Roofer", "Stop, Or My Dog Will Shoot!" and "Elementary School Musical", and the Futurama episodes "Anthology of Interest I", "The Beast with a Billion Backs" and "Reincarnation"), dies from ALS at age 76.
- March 15: Robert Grossman, American painter, caricaturist, sculptor, filmmaker, poster designer, comics artist, cartoonist and animator (Jimmy The C), dies at age 78.
- March 17: Mike MacDonald, French-born Canadian actor and comedian (voice of the Mouse King in The Nutcracker Prince, Rip in The Ripping Friends, Lifeguard in the Ren & Stimpy "Adult Party Cartoon" episode "Naked Beach Frenzy"), dies from heart complications at age 63.

=== April ===
- April 4: Soon-Tek Oh, Korean actor (voice of Zhou in Mulan), dies at age 85.
- April 5: Isao Takahata, Japanese animator, film director and producer (Grave of the Fireflies, The Tale of the Princess Kaguya), dies at age 82.
- April 8: Chuck McCann, American actor, comedian, puppeteer, and television host (voice of Duckworth, Burger Beagle and Bouncer Beagle in DuckTales, The Thing in Fantastic Four and The Incredible Hulk, Blizzard in Iron Man, Heff Heffalump in The New Adventures of Winnie The Pooh, the Amoeba Boys in The Powerpuff Girls, "Moe" Mastro Giovanni in Adventure Time), dies at age 83.
- April 12: Giuliano Cenci, Italian film director (The Adventures of Pinocchio), dies at age 86.
- April 15: R. Lee Ermey, American actor and Marine drill instructor (voice of Sarge in the Toy Story franchise, Sky Marshall Sanchez in Roughnecks: Starship Troopers Chronicles, General Thorton in Big Guy and Rusty the Boy Robot, Colonel O'Malley in Recess: School's Out, Jack in Shark Bait, Wildcat in Batman: The Brave and the Bold, General Tsin in Kung Fu Panda: Legends of Awesomeness, Colonel Leslie Hapablap in The Simpsons episodes "Sideshow Bob's Last Gleaming" and "Waiting for Duffman", General Sims in the Kim Possible episodes "Day of the Snowmen" and "Rufus vs. Commodore Puddles", Sergeant Goonther in The Angry Beavers episode "Fancy Prance", Sergeant Hobo 678 in the Invader Zim episode "Hobo 13", Madison in the Rocket Power episode "Saving Lt. Ryan", Colonel Thrift in the Fillmore! episode "South of Friendship, North of Honor", Drill Sergeant in The Grim Adventures of Billy & Mandy episode "Here Thar Be Dwarves", Sarge in the My Life as a Teenage Robot episode "Last Action Zero", Bunny in the Father of the Pride episode "One Man's Meat Is Another Man's Girlfriend", Warden in the SpongeBob SquarePants episode "The Inmates of Summer"), dies from pneumonia at age 74.
- April 17: Carl Kasell, American radio personality (voiced himself in The Simpsons episode "Pay Pal"), dies from alzheimer's disease at age 84.
- April 23:
  - Bob Dorough, American jazz musician, songwriter and composer (Schoolhouse Rock), dies at age 94.
  - Arthur B. Rubinstein, American composer (Tiny Toon Adventures, The Simpsons), dies from cancer at age 80.
- April 24: Susan Shadburne, American screenwriter, director, producer, and filmmaker (Will Vinton Productions), dies at age 75.

=== May ===
- May 7:
  - Miki Muster, Slovenian sculptor, illustrator, comics artist and animator (Bavaria Film, made cartoons based on the work of Guillermo Mordillo and Manfred Schmidt's Nick Knatterton), dies at age 92.
  - Søren Hyldgaard, Danish film composer (When Life Departs, Help! I'm a Fish), dies at age 55.
- May 11: Zlatko Bourek, Croatian animated film director, screenwriter, production designer and cartoonist, dies at age 88.
- May 13: Margot Kidder, Canadian-American actress (voice of Solitaire in GoBots: Battle of the Rock Lords, Mistress Helga in Aaahh!!! Real Monsters, continued voice of Gaia in Captain Planet and the Planeteers), dies at age 69.
- May 14: Tom Wolfe, American author and journalist (voiced himself in The Simpsons episode "Moe'N'a Lisa"), dies at age 88.
- May 16: Joseph Campanella, American actor (voice of the Lizard in Spider-Man, William Shepard / the Master in Road Rovers, Matthew Thorne in the Batman: The Animated Series episode "Paging the Crime Doctor"), dies at age 93.
- May 17: Jerry Richardson, American animator, storyboard artist, background artist, prop designer and art director (Bobby's World, The Simpsons, Klasky Csupo, Nickelodeon Animation Studio, Adelaide Productions, Futurama, Cartoon Network Studios, Disney Television Animation, Warner Bros. Animation, Brickleberry), dies at age 53.
- May 18: Fred Peters, American animator and comics artist (Walt Disney Company), dies at age 95.
- May 21: Clint Walker, American actor and singer (voice of Nick Nitro in Small Soldiers), dies at age 90.

=== June ===
- June 1: William Edward Phipps, American actor (voice of Prince Charming in Cinderella), dies at age 96.
- June 2: Nick Meglin, American comics writer, theatre lyricist and animation scriptwriter (Batfink, The Pink Panther), dies from a heart attack at age 82.
- June 8: Anthony Bourdain, American celebrity chef, author and travel documentarian (voice of Lance Casteau in the Archer episode "Live and Let Dine", voiced himself in The Simpsons episode "The Food Wife", and the Sanjay and Craig episode "Snake Parts Unknown"), commits suicide at age 61.
- June 11: Rumen Petkov, Bulgarian animator, comics artist (Choko & Boko) and director (Johnny Bravo, Dexter's Laboratory, Cow and Chicken, I Am Weasel, The New Woody Woodpecker Show), dies at age 70.
- June 14: José Castillo, Venezuelan animator (creator of Conejíto, the first animation in the history of Venezuela), dies at age 94.
- June 28:
  - Denis Akiyama, Japanese-Canadian actor (voice of Iceman, Silver Samurai, and Sunfire in X-Men, Malachite in the original English dub of Sailor Moon), dies from cancer at age 66.
  - Harlan Ellison, American screenwriter (Cadillacs and Dinosaurs, Silver Surfer, Love, Death & Robots, voiced himself in Scooby-Doo: Mystery Incorporated, and The Simpsons episode "Married to the Blob", additional voices in The Pirates of Dark Water), dies at age 84.
- June 29: Eugene Pitt, American musician (composed the theme music of Nickelodeon), dies at age 80.

=== July ===
- July 1: Peter Firmin, English animator, puppeteer and illustrator (co-creator of Noggin the Nog, Ivor the Engine and Bagpuss), co-founder of Smallfilms, dies at age 89.
- July 4: Darrell McNeil, American animator, writer, editor, publisher, producer and actor (Hanna-Barbera, Filmation, Bakshi Animation, Ruby-Spears, Walt Disney Company, Warner Bros. Animation, Don Bluth), dies at age 60.
- July 10: Lolee Aries, American television producer and production manager (Film Roman, Nickelodeon Animation Studio, MoonScoop), dies from complications of lymphoma at age 61.
- July 19:
  - Claude Viseur, A.K.A. Clovis, Belgian comic artist and animator (Belvision), dies at age 72.
  - Jon Schnepp, American animator and television director (Space Ghost Coast to Coast, Aqua Teen Hunger Force, Metalocalypse, The Venture Bros.), dies from a stroke at age 51.
- July 20: Carlos Vogt, Argentine comic artist and animator (worked for studio Burone Bruché), dies at age 85.
- July 21: Elmarie Wendel, American actress and singer (voice of Aunt Grizelda in The Lorax, Beverley Billingsley in the American Dad episode "Stanny Boy and Frantastic"), dies at age 89.
- July 25: Patrick Williams, American composer, arranger and conductor (The Simpsons), dies from cancer at age 79.

=== August ===
- August 5:
  - Charlotte Rae, American actress, comedienne and singer (voice of Aunt Pristine Figg in Tom and Jerry: The Movie, Adrienne Van Leydon in Itsy Bitsy Spider, Nanny in 101 Dalmatians: The Series), dies at age 92.
  - David Landsberg, American actor (voice of Woody in The Buford Files, Mr. Griff in Stanley), dies at age 73.
- August 13: Unshō Ishizuka, Japanese voice actor (voice of Jet Black in Cowboy Bebop, Mr. Satan in the Dragon Ball franchise, Van Hohenheim in Fullmetal Alchemist: Brotherhood, Zabuza Momochi in Naruto, Joseph Joestar in JoJo's Bizarre Adventure: Stardust Crusaders, narrator and Professor Oak in Pokémon), dies at age 67.
- August 15: Kunihiro Abe, Japanese animator (Gundam), dies at age 59 or 60.
- August 20: Brian Murray, South African actor and theatre director (voice of Long John Silver in Treasure Planet), dies at age 80.
- August 21: Stefán Karl Stefánsson, Icelandic actor and singer (portrayed Robbie Rotten in LazyTown), dies from bile duct cancer at age 43.
- August 23: Russ Heath, American comic book artist and animator (G.I. Joe: A Real American Hero), dies at age 91 from cancer.
- August 24: Robin Leach, English entertainment reporter and writer (voice of TV Host in the Garfield and Friends episode "Fat and Furry", Chamberlain in the Happily Ever After: Fairy Tales for Every Child episode "The Empress' Nightingale", voiced himself in the Family Guy episode "Peter, Peter, Caviar Eater"), dies from a stroke at age 76.
- August 25: Miyoko Asō, Japanese actress (voice of Fune Isono in Sazae-san, Pinako Rockbell in Fullmetal Alchemist, Cologne in Ranma ½), dies from dementia at age 92.
- August 31: Carole Shelley, English actress (voice of Amelia Gabble in The Aristocats, Lady Kluck in Robin Hood), dies at age 79.

=== September ===
- September 6: Burt Reynolds, American actor (voice of Charlie B. Barkin in All Dogs Go to Heaven, Senator Buckingham in American Dad!, Judge Keaton in the Duckman episode "Das Sub", M.F. Thatherton in the King of the Hill episode "The Company Man", Narrator/Old Tommy in The Legend of Frosty the Snowman), dies at age 82.

=== October ===
- October 4:
  - Will Vinton, American animator and film director (The Adventures of Mark Twain, The California Raisins), dies at age 70.
  - Audrey Wells, American producer, director and screenwriter (Over the Moon), dies from cancer at age 58.
- October 7:
  - Gibba, Italian animator and comics artist, dies at age 93.
  - Michel Lyman, American animator (The Little Rascals Christmas Special, A Family Circus Christmas, A Chipmunk Christmas, The Mighty Kong), storyboard artist (DIC Entertainment), sheet timer (Film Roman, DIC Entertainment, Klasky Csupo, Nickelodeon Animation Studio, Hyperion Pictures, Adelaide Productions, All Dogs Go to Heaven: The Series, Mike, Lu & Og, Generation O!, Disney Television Animation, The Cramp Twins, Warner Bros. Animation, Stripperella, American Dad!, Cartoon Network Studios, LeapFrog, Brickleberry, Madea's Tough Love, Bordertown, Dawn of the Croods, She-Ra and the Princesses of Power, Guardians of the Galaxy), lip sync artist (Mike, Lu & Og, King of the Hill, Tron: Uprising, Guardians of the Galaxy), animatic editor (Adventure Time), production manager (The California Raisin Show), producer (The Legend of Prince Valiant) and director (The Legend of Prince Valiant, The Real Adventures of Jonny Quest, The Angry Beavers, Phantom 2040, C Bear and Jamal, The Grim Adventures of Billy & Mandy, Sym-Bionic Titan), dies at age 67.
- October 9: Adam Burke, American animator (Pixar), dies at age 47.
- October 15: Domingo Rivera, American animator and clean-up artist (Cats Don't Dance, Quest for Camelot, The Iron Giant, The Tigger Movie, Atlantis: The Lost Empire, Eight Crazy Nights, Sinbad: Legend of the Seven Seas, The Simpsons, The Simpsons Movie), dies at an unknown age.
- October 17: Robert J. Walsh, American composer (Looney Tunes, Marvel Productions), dies at age 70.
- October 27: Stephen Sustarsic, American television producer and writer (Disney Television Animation, Mighty Max, Exosquad, Bump in the Night, Duckman, Dilbert, Xiaolin Showdown, Danny Phantom, Loonatics Unleashed, World of Quest, Fanboy & Chum Chum, WordGirl, Johnny Test, Xiaolin Chronicles, co-creator of The Wild Thornberrys), dies at age 62.
- October 30: David Cherkassky, Soviet and Ukrainian animated film director (Treasure Island) and screenwriter (Kievnauchfilm), dies at age 87.

=== November ===
- November 4: Jacques Muller, French animator (Walt Disney Company, Warner Bros. Animation, Amblin, ILM), dies at age 62.
- November 5: Rick Reinert, American animator, film director and producer (MGM, Walt Disney Animation Studios, Rick Reinert Productions), dies at age 93.
- November 7: Orlando Corradi, Italian film animator and director (founder of Mondo TV), dies at age 78.
- November 13: Stan Lee, American comics writer, editor and publisher (narrator in The Incredible Hulk and Spider-Man and His Amazing Friends, voice of Fred's dad in Big Hero 6 and Big Hero 6: The Series, the Mayor of Superhero City in The Super Hero Squad Show, Mayor Stan in Hulk and the Agents of S.M.A.S.H., Stan the janitor in Ultimate Spider-Man, himself in Teen Titans Go! To the Movies, The Simpsons episodes "I Am Furious (Yellow)", "The Caper Chase" and "Married to the Blob", and the Spider-Man episode "Farewell Spider-Man"), dies at age 95.
- November 24: Ricky Jay, American stage magician, actor and writer (narrator in the Teen Titans Go! episode "Double Trouble", voiced himself in The Simpsons episode "The Great Simpsina"), dies at age 72.
- November 26: Stephen Hillenburg, American comics artist, animator, writer, producer, director, designer, storyboard artist, illustrator and actor (Rocko's Modern Life, creator of SpongeBob SquarePants), dies at age 57.

=== December ===
- December 1: Ken Berry, American actor, dancer and singer (voice of the title character in Peter-No-Tail, Seymour Grey in The New Batman Adventures episode "Never Fear"), dies at age 85.
- December 10: Alvin Epstein, American actor and director (voice of Bookseller in Beauty and the Beast), dies at age 93.
- December 17: Penny Marshall, American actress, film director and producer (voice of Laverne DeFazio in Laverne & Shirley in the Army, Ms. Botz in The Simpsons episode "Some Enchanted Evening", The Elder in Scooby-Doo! and Kiss: Rock and Roll Mystery), dies at age 75.
- December 19: Audrey Geisel, American businesswomen, philanthropist, producer (Daisy-Head Mayzie, Horton Hears a Who!, The Lorax, The Grinch), and widow of Dr. Seuss, dies at age 97.
- December 27: Børge Ring, Danish animator, jazz musician and comics artist (Oh My Darling, Anna & Bella, Run of the Mill), dies at age 97.
- December 29: June Whitfield, English radio, television, and film actress (voice of Mrs. Rabbit in The World of Peter Rabbit and Friends and Judge Pikelet in the Rex the Runt episode "The Trials of Wendy") dies at age 93.
- December 30: Don Lusk, American animator and director (Walt Disney Animation Studios, Peanuts, Hanna-Barbera), dies at age 105.

== See also ==
- 2018 in anime
- List of animated television series of 2018
