= Robozuna =

2018 UK animated television series

- Genre: Animation; Science fiction Action
- Created by: Ed Bignell
- Music by: Guy Michelmore
- Country of origin: United Kingdom
- Original language: English
- No. of series: 2
- No. of episodes: 40

Production
- Executive producers: Stephen Green; Giles Ridge; Ed Bignell; Andrew Baker
- Producers: Roddy Mcmanus; Alex Tham; Luke Howard
- Running time: 22 minutes
- Production companies: ITV Studios; KidsCave Entertainment

Original release
- Network: CITV
- Release: 20 October 2018 – 2 May 2020

Robozuna is a British animated science fiction children's television series on CITV and Netflix starring Taylor Clarke-Hill, Tom Clarke-Hill and Luke Howard. The premise revolves around a planet seized by an evil empire and its legion of robots. The orphan boy Ariston (Taylor Clarke-Hill) and his homemade robot friend Mangle (Tom Clarke-Hill) try to free their planet.

== Cast ==
- Taylor Clarke-Hill as Ariston
- Tom Clarke-Hill as Mangle
- Luke Howard as Drubber
- Ali-A as Clunk
- Danny John-Jules as Niven and Spark
- Morwenna Banks as Danuvia

== Episodes ==
Season	Episodes	Originally released	
Season	Episodes	First released	Last released
1	20	October 20, 2018	March 15, 2019
2	20	September 2, 2019	May 2, 2020

=== Series 1 (Season 1 and 2 on Netflix) (2018-2019) ===
No. overall	No. in series	Title	Directed by	Written by	Original release date
1	1	"Game Changer Part 1"	Ed Bignell	Ed Bignell & Greg Johnson	October 20, 2018
Playful teenager Ariston wants to prove that his robot buddy Mangle has what it takes to turn into a Combatabot and become a Robozuna star.
2	2	"Game Changer Part 2"	Ed Bignell	Ed Bignell & Greg Johnson	October 25, 2018
When Ariston and Mangle go to the first big Robozuna match, Mangle gets into the action! But they face a tougher fight when they return home.
3	3	"Team Natrix"	Ed Bignell	John Semper, Jr. & Rebecca Kaminski	October 25, 2018
As Team VEredus prepares to take on Corvus's Team Natrix, Mangle and Ariston get distracted by a mission that could help them, but hurt the team.
4	4	"Lightning Harvesters"	Ed Bignell	Ed Bignell & Greg Johnson	October 25, 2018
The team helps a lightning harvester hold off a Corvus attack, then takes on Team Capra to try and keep its Robozuna winning streak alive.
5	5	"Breakout"	Steve Majaury	Eric Lewald & Julia Lewald	October 25, 2018
Teamwork is the key as the Veredus crew breaks into the Corvus prison on a dangerous mission to find Feronia.
6	6	"Ariston's Dream"	Steve Majaury	Len Uhley	October 25, 2018
Motivated by a hopeful dream, Ariston takes Mangle to find Niven. But it leaves the team short-handed for a big Robozuna game.
7	7	"Lightning in a Bottle"	Steve Majaury	Rich Fogel	October 25, 2018
Just when the team thinks it's time to take a break and rest, they're called on for help defending a lightning harvester camp from Commander Vermis.
8	8	"Rematch"	Steve Majaury	Grant Moran	October 25, 2018
After Team Natrix unleashes a massive Robozuna called Megabatabot, it leaves the arena on a rampage, and Team Veredus must protect the town.
9	9	"Free for All Part 1"	Steve Majaury	Kevin Hopps	October 25, 2018
While Team Veredus and Team Vulpes work together in a big midseason tournament, the other Freebot Fighters head to the Corvus prison.
10	10	"Free for All Part 2"	Steve Majaury	Kevin Hopps	October 25, 2018
The midseason tournament comes to a thrilling end, but the Freebots have their hands full trying to stop Danuvia's plan to build an invincible army.
11	11	"Dominatus"	Steve Majaury	Ed Bignell & Len Uhley	March 15, 2019
Team Veredus has their hands full competing for the awesome Agbia Trophy, but things get even tougher when they're attacked by a powerful new robot; the Dominatus.
12	12	"Hacked"	Steve Majaury	Rich Fogel	March 15, 2019
When Clunk starts behaving strangely at a Robozuna game, the Freebots realize he's been hacked and programmed to take on a dangerous mission
13	13	"Rebel Friends Part 1"	Steve Majaury	Eric Lewald & Julia Lewald	March 15, 2019
After meeting a new rebel group, the Freebots are happy to learn they've inspired others. But when the new group lands in danger, the Freebots must act fast.
14	14	"Rebel Friends Part 2"	Steve Majaury	Hanah Lee Cook	March 15, 2019
Livia suspects the new rebel group might not be on the Freebots' side, so she scrambles to let the rest of the team know.
15	15	"Home"	Steve Majaury	Len Uhley	March 15, 2019
When Mangle starts acting strangely, he takes off and leads the team to a special location... but the Dominatus is after them!
16	16	"Right Thing to Do"	Steve Majaury	Eric Lewald & Julia Lewald	March 15, 2019
The Freebots must work with a pair of bounty hunters to find Hitch the hacker and prevent Corvus from stealing her robot-control tech.
17	17	"Reunion"	Steve Majaury	Rich Fogel	March 15, 2019
Chike reunited with his estranged father "The Fixer", when Clunk needs repairs. But when a criminal threatens them, the Freebots arrive to help.
18	18	"Unmasked"	Steve Majaury	John Semper, Jr. & Rebecca Kaminski	March 15, 2019
Commander Vermis attempts to arrest Team Veredus when he thinks he's identified them as the Freebots, but the Freebots' friends have a plan of their own.
19	19	"Endgame Part 1"	Steve Majaury	Rich Fogel	March 15, 2019
Team Veredus hope playing the league finals at Danuvia's palace will help them discover her plan, but Team Natrix wants to keep them out of the arena.
20	20	"Endgame Part 2"	Steve Majaury	Len Uhley	March 15, 2019
Team Veredus reaches the Border League finals. They go head-to-head for a win in an attempt to stop Danuvia from achieving her mission.

=== Series 2 (Season 3 and 4 on Netflix) (2019-2020) ===
No. overall	No. in series	Title	Directed by	Written by	Original release date
21	1	"A New Dawn Part 1"	Steve Majaury	Rich Fogel	September 2, 2019
Having ended Danuvia's reign of teror, the Freebot fighters are hailed as heroes, until Mangle's new crystal glitches causing all of the bots to run amok. To stop the chaos, Mangle must remove the crystal from his head.
22	2	"A New Dawn Part 2"	Steve Majaury	Eric Lewald & Julia Lewald	September 3, 2019
Caesar is wary of the Freebots arriving in Latium. But they prove to be useful allies when they defend one of his security bases from Danuvia's attacks.
23	3	"Finding Proto"	Steve Majaury	Len Uhley	September 4, 2019
Ariston, Mangle and the Freebot Fighters return to Feronia's old lab and uncover the secret of Mangle's connection to Ariston. They foil another one of Danuvia's plans to get her hands on more crystals.
24	4	"Plan B"	Steve Majaury	Hanah Lee Cook	September 5, 2019
When Chike's dad goes to work for Soren, the wealthy industrialist, Ariston and his friends discover something at one of Soren's factories. It's Vesuvio, whose powers are unleashed when Danuvia's Dominatus Bots attack one of Caesar's storage plants.
25	5	"All Shook Up"	Steve Majaury	Thomas Pugsley	September 6, 2019
When Danuvia forces Niven to drill for crystals, it causes what appears to be an earthquake, which disrupts the Robozuna games. It's up to Ariston, Mangle and the Freebot Fighters to stop Danuvia before she causes cataclysmic damage to the rest of Latium.
26	6	"Off Sides"	Steve Majaury	Len Uhley	September 9, 2019
Mangle discovers that his new teammates moonlight as thieves. When Vermis hires the team to steal a crystal chip from Illex, Mangle summons Ariston and the Freebot Fighters to foil the robbery.
27	7	"Coach Mangle"	Steve Majaury	John Semper, Jr. & Rebecca Kaminski	September 10, 2019
Gizi and Zeve steal some valuable strategy chips to give them an unfair advantage against Team Veredus in the arena. Meanwhile, Danuvia is furious over Feronia's growing influence over Caesar, so she order Illex the bounty hunter to capture her.
28	8	"New Recruits"	Steve Majaury	Rich Fogel & Ed Bignell	September 11, 2019
To win Mangle back from Team Squalus, Ariston needs to borrow some of Civette's Combatabots. But they've been bot-napped by Danuvia, so the Freebot Fighters have to track them down and rescue them from her evil clutches.
29	9	"Power Play Part 1"	Steve Majaury	Eric Lewald & Julia Lewald	September 12, 2019
While Ariston and Mangle fight to free their friend Tesh's village from Danuvia's troops, the rest of Team Veredus confront their friend Drubber, who's fallen under Danuvia's control.
30	10	"Power Play Part 2"	Steve Majaury	Rich Fogel	September 13, 2019
Using Drubber, Dabuvia plots to take out Caesar and seize control of all Latium. Only Mangle and his friends can stop her.
31	11	"Servitude Part 1"	Steve Majaury	Len Uhley	February 29, 2020
When Danuvia returns and seizes power, she immediately orders Feronia arrested for treason. The Freebot Fighters must help Feronia escape.
32	12	"Servitude Part 2"	Steve Majaury	Marty Isenberg	March 7, 2020
Feronia asks the Freebots to abduct Caesar, so that she can learn the secret of a mysterious key that she discovered in her compound.
33	13	"Arms Race"	Steve Majaury	Rich Fogel	March 14, 2020
Team Veredus plays in a special three-team game, while Zeve steals and attempts to sell a special weapon arm built by Sarcio.
34	14	"Key to Victory"	Steve Majaury	Hanah Lee Cook	March 22, 2020
While trying to capture Danuvia, the Freebot Fighters run into trouble as they struggle to wotk with their new ally, Illex. Meanwhile, Team Veredus struggles to work with their new team member, Drubber.
35	15	"Mother Stone"	Steve Majaury	Len Uhley	March 28, 2020
In a hidden desert oasis, Ariston and Mangle discover a living spore that tells them about the history of Corvus and reveals Danuvia's true intentions.
36	16	"Identity Crisis"	Steve Majaury	Rich Fogel	April 4, 2020
After a battle with Vesuvio, Mangle is damaged and loses his memory. Separated from Ariston, Mangle is adopted by a group of nomadic scavengers.
37	17	"Allies"	Steve Majaury	Marty Isenberg	April 11, 2020
While Ariston puts his life at risk for a map of the Extractor Probes' locations, Livia and Mangle recruit allies in their struggle against Danuvia and Corvus.
38	18	"Eye on the Prize"	Steve Majaury	Kevin Hopps	April 18, 2020
As the citizens of Latium go hungry, Ariston and the Greebot Fighters must find a way to get food past Vermis and his Centurions to those in need.
39	19	"All or Nothing Part 1"	Steve Majaury	Len Uhley	April 25, 2020
Time is running out as Danuvia gets closer to locating the Mother Stone, while Ariston and his friends are desperate to stop her.
40	20	"All or Nothing Part 2"	Steve Majaury	Rich Fogel	May 2, 2020
It's the final battle, and Ariston and Mangle try to disrupt Danuvia's plans by planting a virus into the central core.

== Home media ==
In UK, ITV Studios Global Entertainment will publish the series soon on DVD.
