= Wolfoo =

Vietnamese animated series by SConnect

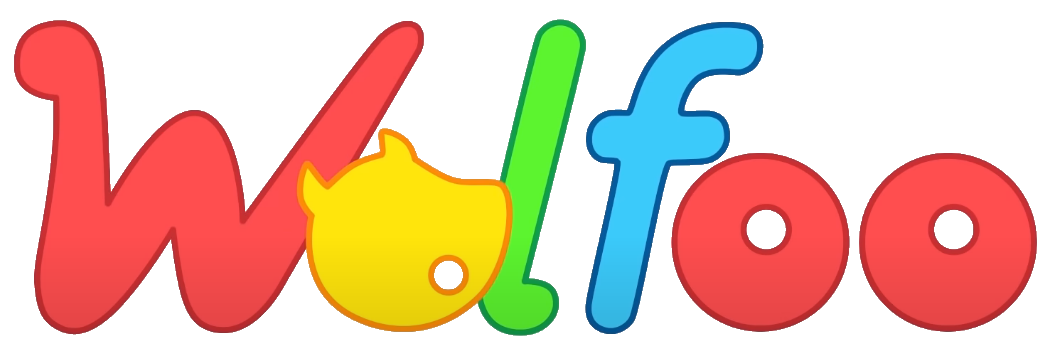
- Genre: Children's web series
- Created by: SConnect; WOA Network (Note: WOA Network is owned by SConnect as shown in SConnect website.)
- Countries of origin: Vietnam; United States
- Original language: English
- No. of seasons: (Note: The show has never officially separated the episodes into seasons.)
- No. of episodes: 1000+

Production
- Running time: 2–3 minutes

Original release
- Network: YouTube
- Release: August 23, 2018 – present

Related
- Bearee

Wolfoo is a Vietnamese preschool animated web series produced and created by SConnect and WOA Network. Wolfoo was released on August 23, 2018. In 2026, SConnect lost a copyright battle against Hasbro due to its similarity to Peppa Pig, and was ordered to remove its Wolfoo videos from all platforms. Evidence was found that the series illegally used audio excerpts from Peppa Pig.

== Overview ==
The show follows Wolfoo, an anthropomorphic 5-year-old wolf who lives in a small American-styled village with his parents and sisters, Lucy and Jenny, along with his three best friends, Pando, Kat and Bufo. Wolfoo also has other friends.

== Characters ==
- Wolfoo is the protagonist of the show. He is five years old, and belongs to the Wolf family. Superman is his favorite character. He is kind and smart. He sometimes apologizes when he makes mistakes and his catchphrase (utilized at the end of an episode) is "Awooo!" like a wolf's howl, the same as his little sister Lucy.
- Lucy is Wolfoo's sister. She belongs to the Wolf family. She is three years old and sometimes likes to manipulate Wolfoo by forcing him to play with dolls. Elsa is her favorite character. She is the only member of the Wolf family (besides Jenny, who is pink) who is brown, while the rest are grey. Her friends are Nancy, Amy and Kasper.
- Jenny is a baby wolf and the youngest of the Wolf family. She is Wolfoo and Lucy's baby cousin (though she is sometimes called Wolfoo and Lucy’s baby sister), and the niece of Mr. Wolf and Mrs. Wolf.
- Mr. Wolf is Wolfoo and Lucy's father, Jenny's uncle, and the husband of Mrs. Wolf. He is an architect and is sometimes busy with his work yet he has time to be with his family.
- Mrs. Wolf is Wolfoo and Lucy's mother, Jenny's aunt, and the wife of Mr. Wolf. She is a florist and a housewife.
- Pando is Wolfoo's best friend. He has a huge obsession with apples and he is playful and clumsy. He has a baby cousin named Pandollar.
- Mr. Pan is Pando's father. He is very playful, childlike, and likes presenting and cooking dishes in a 5-star restaurant. He has a wife (named Mrs. Pan) who is a spa attendant.
- Kat is one of Wolfoo's friends. She is very smart and is the most intellectual of Wolfoo's friend group. She likes reading books and has a brother named Kasper, She has a phobia of rats.
- Bufo is one of Wolfoo's friends. He comes from a wealthy family. He is a bully to Wolfoo and his friends but apologizes and learns his lesson. Despite his name being the scientific name for toads, he is neither a toad nor a frog; he is a water buffalo. He loves listening to hip-hop music.
- Piggy is Bufo's best friend and sidekick at bullying, though like Bufo he sometimes learns his lesson. He comes from an agricultural rural family and treats Bufo like a "big brother". He has a younger sister named Nancy.
- Moly is one of Wolfoo's friends. He is the same age of Wolfoo, and is a good problem-solver. He comes from a hard-working family who lives in a burrow. He is a mouse-mole hybrid, not just a purebred mole, which makes him unique compared to the others.
- Nancy is one of Lucy's best friends and is a sister of Piggy. She is a bit shy, kind and curious and treats Lucy as her "sweet princess", and even protects her in when she faces danger. She has same interests as her.
- Croco is one of Wolfoo's friends. He is less boisterous than the others, and he is very reserved, which is why he often appears in the background and not as a main character unlike Wolfoo, Lucy, Pando, Kat, Piggy, Bufo and Moly. He is the same age of Wolfoo. His father, Mr. Croco, is a magician.
- Kasper is a youngest adopted brother of Kat. He has a pet hamster named Pippy who lives in his pocket. He is 3 years old and grew up in a household filled with art, science and technology. He's one of the students in Ms Cam's class (an art teacher in Wolfoo's school).
- Amy is a friend of Nancy, Lucy and Kasper and a student in Ms Cam's class. She loves photography and has a yellow camera which hangs above her dress, Sometimes her friends don’t like her when her fur sticks out when she’s mad. Strangely enough, Ms Cam is actually her mother.

The voice actors of the characters have not been publicly revealed.

== History ==
The first official episode of Wolfoo was published on August 23, 2018. Several Wolfoo channels were launched on YouTube; some examples are "Wolfoo America", "Wolfoo's Stories", "Wolfoo Shows", and "Wolfoo – Sing Along Songs". This is similar to a method used by other content farms. A series of feature-length online films, such as Wolfoo the Adventurer, were also released on YouTube. A spin-off, Bearee, was released on April 16, 2022.

The show is available on 40 VOD (video on-demand) platforms in China, and was later released in Chinese children's TV networks due to SConnect's deal with its Chinese market partner Leadjoy, with SConnect producing and releasing a 3D version of the cartoon.

In October 2023, a movie named Wolfoo and the Mysterious Island (Vietnamese: Wolfoo và hòn đảo kỳ bí) (Note: Also known as Wolfoo the Adventurer 4 or Wolfoo Series 4.) was released, which premiered on Vietnamese cinemas and entered box office revenue as the top 3 after one week, but the full film was not uploaded internationally.

In July 2026, SConnect lost a copyright battle against Hasbro, which owns the rights to Peppa Pig, and was ordered to remove videos from all platforms that featured Wolfoo.

== Reception and controversy ==
Wolfoo has also been criticized for its usage of gross-out humor throughout its run, constantly featuring animated depictions of defecation and or urination by several characters, pregnancy and anthropomorphic organs. This type of content is similar to Elsagate, a controversy concerning a genre of animated children's videos in YouTube. It was accused of copyright infringement by the creators of Peppa Pig, and the show's distributor, Entertainment One (now Lionsgate Canada), sued SConnect for Wolfoo's visual and aesthetic similarity to the show.

On January 24, 2022, Entertainment One filled a case against SConnect at the High Court of Justice as follows: rework of Peppa Pig characters, using the art style of Peppa Pig, using the exclamation sounds of Peppa Pig in 91 Wolfoo videos; causing unfair competition, causing the misunderstanding that Peppa Pig and Wolfoo share the same owner and violating the trademark of Peppa Pig. In 2026, SConnect lost the case, with the judge ruling that the cartoon used illegally copied audio from Peppa Pig.

In November 2022, the Authority of Broadcasting and Electronic Information requested Google to look at and resolve the issue of Wolfoo episodes being deleted on YouTube by Entertainment One's ongoing copyright strikes. After the intervention of Vietnamese authorities, YouTube reopened the YouTube channels of the show; however, by July 2024 4,000 videos of the show had yet to be relaunched.
