= Debutante =

Upper-class girl introduced to high society

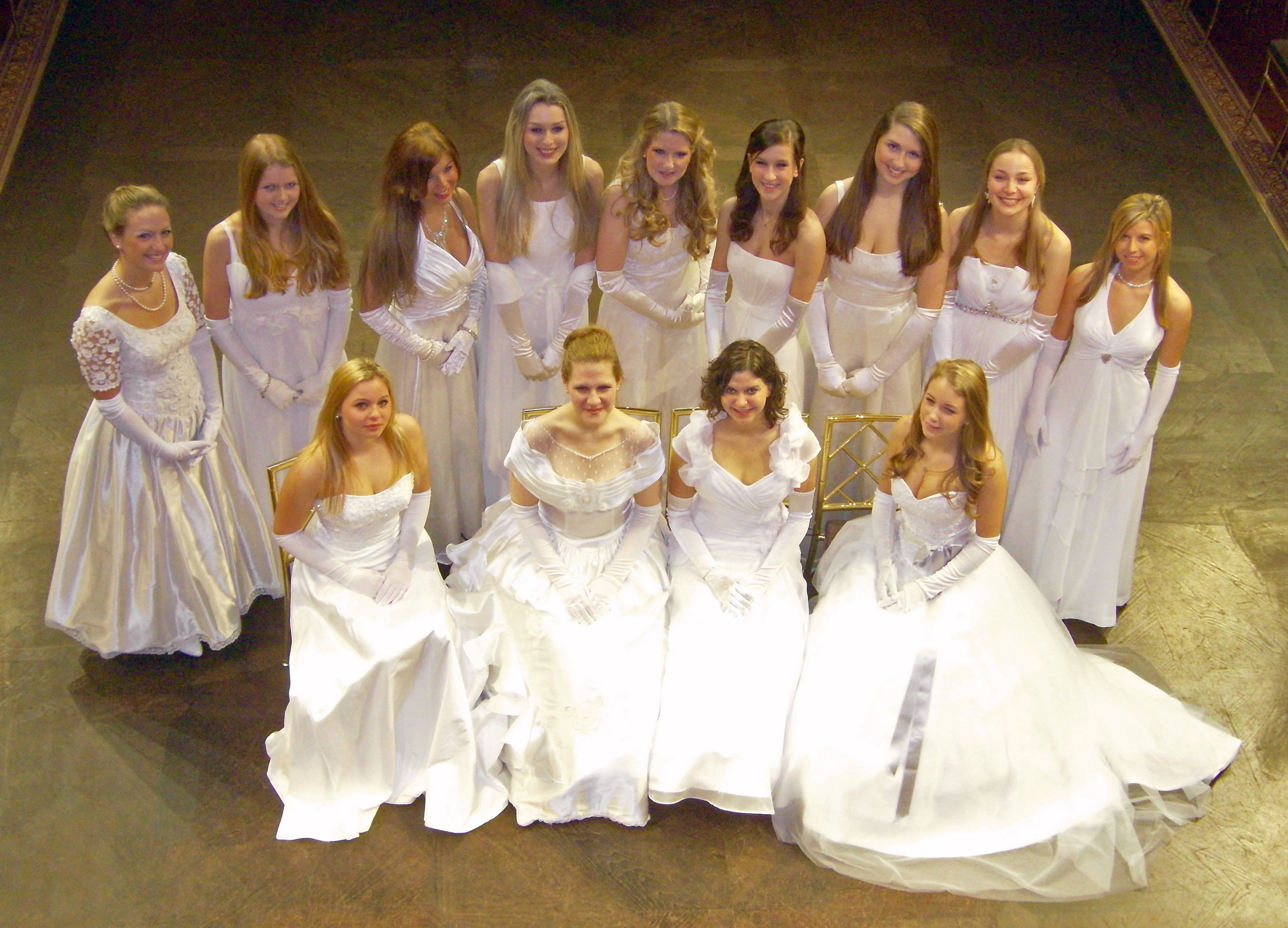
Debutantes at the Chrysanthemum Ball in Munich (2012)

A debutante, also spelled débutante (/ˈdɛbjʊtɑːnt/ DEB-yuu-tahnt; from French: débutante [debytɑ̃t], 'female beginner'), or deb is a young woman of aristocratic or upper-class family background who has reached maturity and is presented to society at a formal "debut" (UK: /ˈdeɪbjuː, ˈdɛbjuː/ DAY-byoo, DEB-yoo, US: /deɪˈbjuː/ day-BYOO; French: début [deby]) or debutante ball. Originally, the term indicated that the woman was old enough to be married, and one purpose of her "coming out" was to display her to eligible bachelors and their families with a view to marriage within a select circle.

A debutante ball, sometimes called a coming-out party, is a formal ball that includes presenting debutantes during the social season, usually during the spring or summer. Debutante balls may require prior instruction in social etiquette and appropriate morals.

The event is often used as a fund-raiser for local charities and opportunities for community service.

== Austria ==
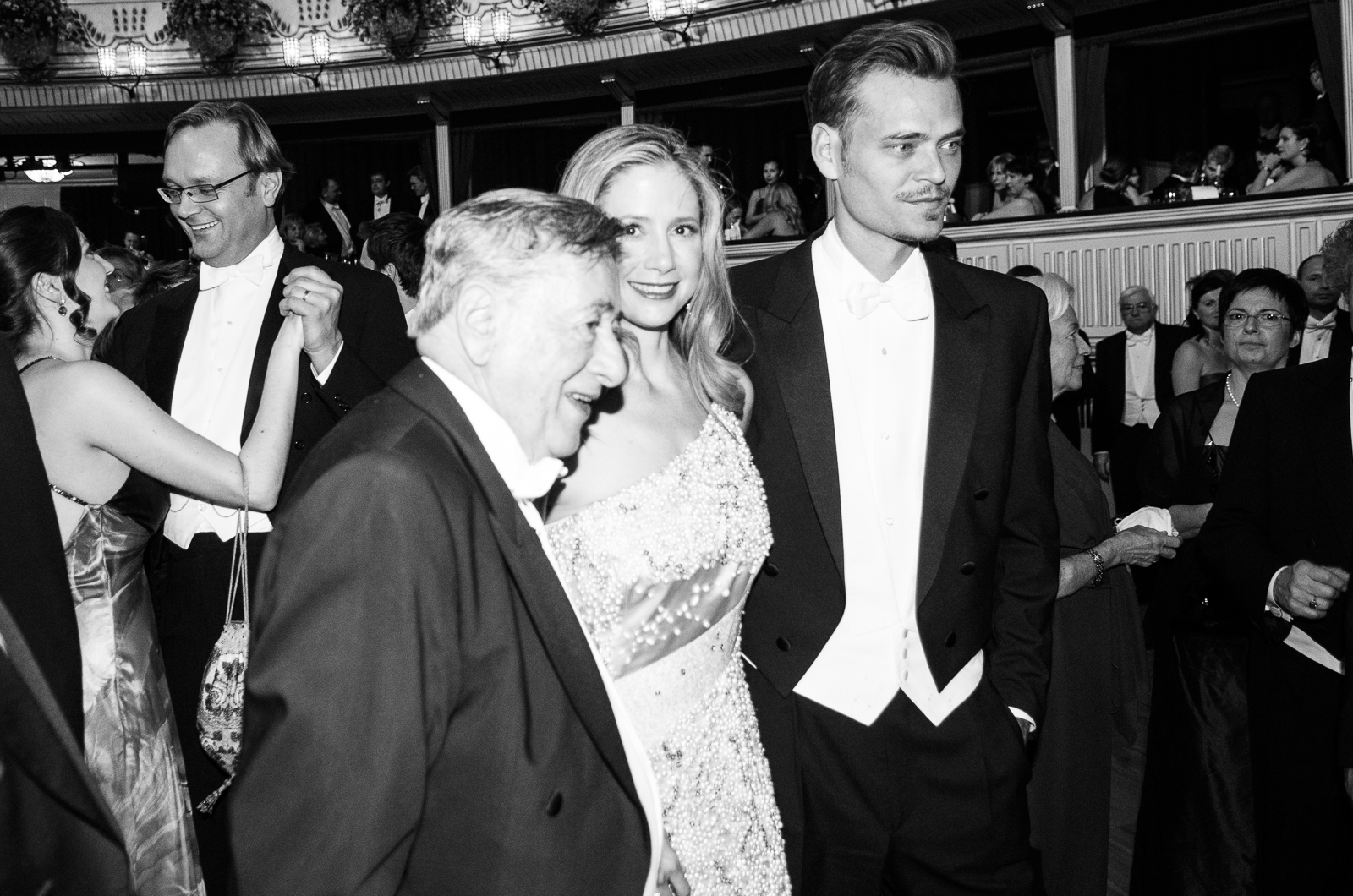
Some attendees of the 2013 Vienna Opera Ball

Vienna, Austria, maintains the most active formal ball season in the world. From 1 January to 1 March, no fewer than 28 formal balls, with a huge variety of hosts, are held in Vienna, many of which act as debutante balls. The Ball der Offiziere and the Vienna Opera Ball are best-known for their debutantes.

The Officers' Ball was founded in 1919, by the association Alt-Neustadt, an association of graduates of the Theresian Military Academy. They have organized the ball publicly since 1926. The Ball is held in January across the twenty-three salons of the Vienna Hofburg Palace. The entrance and presentation of the 80 debutantes from the nobility, daughters of senior ranking military officers, or female officers in the Austrian military. They are presented to the Minister of Defense.

The Vienna Opera Ball is held in the auditorium of the Vienna State Opera and hosted by the Austrian president. There are performances of the state opera ballet company and classical arias sung by the opera stars. The highlight of the opening ceremony is the introduction of 180 debutante couples – carefully selected young women and men who have successfully completed an application program – and a strict classical dance choreography organised by the Elmayer dance school.

== Australia ==
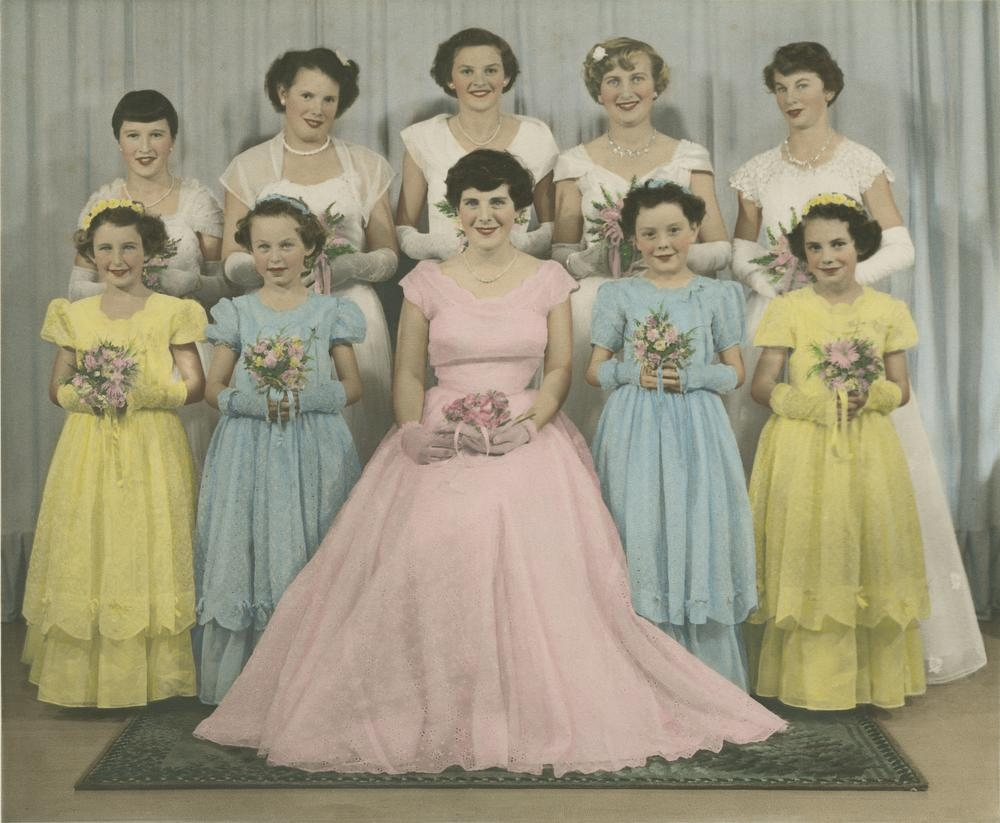
Young women making their debut accompanied by younger attendants in Queensland (1948)

Australia inherited the practice of debutante presentation from the British monarchy, with colonial governors and Governors-General of Australia responsible for organizing events in the early decades.

In modern Australia, debutante balls (or colloquially "deb balls") are usually organised by high schools, church groups or service clubs, such as Lions or Rotary. The girls who take part are in either Year 10, 11 or 12 at high school (i.e. aged between 15 and 18).

The Australian debutante wears a white or pale-coloured gown similar to a wedding dress, though without a train and veil. The boy wears black tie or another formal dress suit.

It is customary for the debutante to ask a boy to the debutante ball, with males not being able to "do the deb" unless they are asked, similar to a Sadie Hawkins Dance. The debutantes and their partners must learn how to dance in ballroom style. Debutante balls are almost always held in a reception centre, school hall, the function room of a sporting or other community organisation, e.g. RSL club, or ballroom. Usually they are held late in the year and consist of dinner, dancing, and speeches.

== Canada ==
Canada inherited the practice of debutante presentation to the local representative of the British monarch. By 1867, events were held by the Governor General of Canada in the chambers of the Senate of Canada.

Canadian debutantes often travelled to the United Kingdom to be presented at the Court of St James's. The last debutante to be presented was Canadian Sandra Seagram.

== Poland ==
In Poland the pre-World War II tradition of debutante balls was reinstated in 1998 by Countess Jolanta Mycielska. The bi-annual "Debutant Ball" is supported by the Sovereign Order of Malta and proceeds are donated to its charitable work. The twelfth edition took place on 29-31 August 2025 at the Warsaw Grand Theatre - National Opera, with previous editions being held i.a. at the Warsaw Royal Castle.

== United Kingdom ==
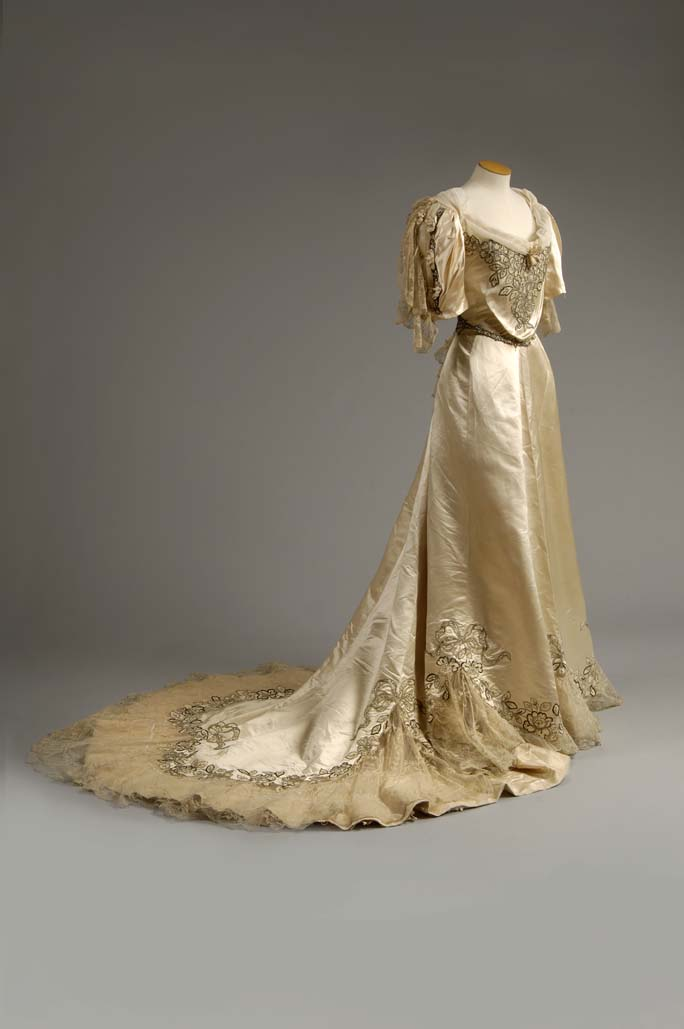
An 1890s-era debutante gown

In early modern times, high-status marriage in the UK was accompanied with an economic transaction that required a dowry for the woman, who would not inherit her father's estate. The Protestant Reformation eliminated convents where less desirable daughters could be sent and avoid the expense of buying a desirable husband. To more efficiently match unmarried women of relatively high-status families to eligible bachelors, Queen Elizabeth I established the tradition of summoning them for formal presentation to the British monarch.

In 1780, King George III organized the first Queen Charlotte's Ball at the Court of St James's in honour of his wife's birthday and to counter criticism that the couple was too frugal. This began the tradition of the British social season beginning with presentation of debutantes at royal court.

In the Victorian era, those who wanted to be presented at court required a former debutante, i.e. a lady who had previously been presented to the sovereign, to apply on their behalf for permission. Such recommendations were often made by the mother of a young woman, or her mother-in-law if she was married. As eligibility expanded beyond British nobles, wealthy American families would sometimes pay British noblewomen to allow their daughters to become debutantes in the UK. If the application was accepted, they would be sent a royal summons from the Lord Chamberlain to attend the presentation on a certain day. According to Debrett's, the proceedings on that day always started at 10 am. In addition to debutantes, older women, and married women who had not previously been presented, could be presented at court.

On the day of the court presentation, the debutante and her sponsor would be announced, the debutante would curtsy to the monarch, and she would leave without turning her back.

After the widespread availability of suitably white fabric in the Victorian era, the court dress was traditionally a white evening dress, but shades of ivory and pink were acceptable. The dress featured short sleeves and the young woman also wore long white gloves, a veil attached to the hair with three white ostrich feathers, and a train, which the debutante would hold on her arm until she was ready to be presented. Debutantes would wear pearls, but many would also wear jewelery that belonged to the family.

After the debutantes had been presented to the monarch, they would attend the social season. The season consisted of events such as afternoon tea parties, polo matches, races at Royal Ascot, and balls. Many debutantes would also have their own "coming-out party" or, alternatively, a party shared with a sister or other member of family.

Debutante presentations were cancelled in 1921 due to a coal miners' strike, and abbreviated in 1936 due to the impatience of King Edward VIII.

The last debutantes were presented at the Court of St James's in 1958, after which Queen Elizabeth II abolished the ceremony; Princess Margaret, the Queen's sister, acidly remarked, "We had to put a stop to it. Every tart in London was getting in", as British society was becoming more egalitarian. More "bluestocking" debutantes went to college after their debuts, and participants had been complaining about the physical and financial burden. Attempts were made to keep the tradition going by organizing a series of parties for young women who might otherwise have been presented at court in their first season (to which suitable young men were also invited) by Peter Townend. However, the withdrawal of royal patronage made these occasions decreasingly significant, and scarcely distinguishable from any other part of the social season. The last Queen Charlotte's Ball under Elizabeth II was in 1976. It has since been revived under the patronage of the Duke of Somerset; debutantes bow to the Queen Charlotte's birthday cake. The monarchy took a more populist approach, emphasizing the Victorian tradition of garden parties, to which Elizabeth invited people from all backgrounds.

=== In popular culture ===
The expression "debutante", or "deb" for short, has continued to be used, especially in the press, to refer to young women of marriageable age who participate in a semi-public, upper class social scene.

The expression "deb's delight" is applied to good-looking, unmarried young men from similar backgrounds.

== United States ==
=== American debutante balls ===
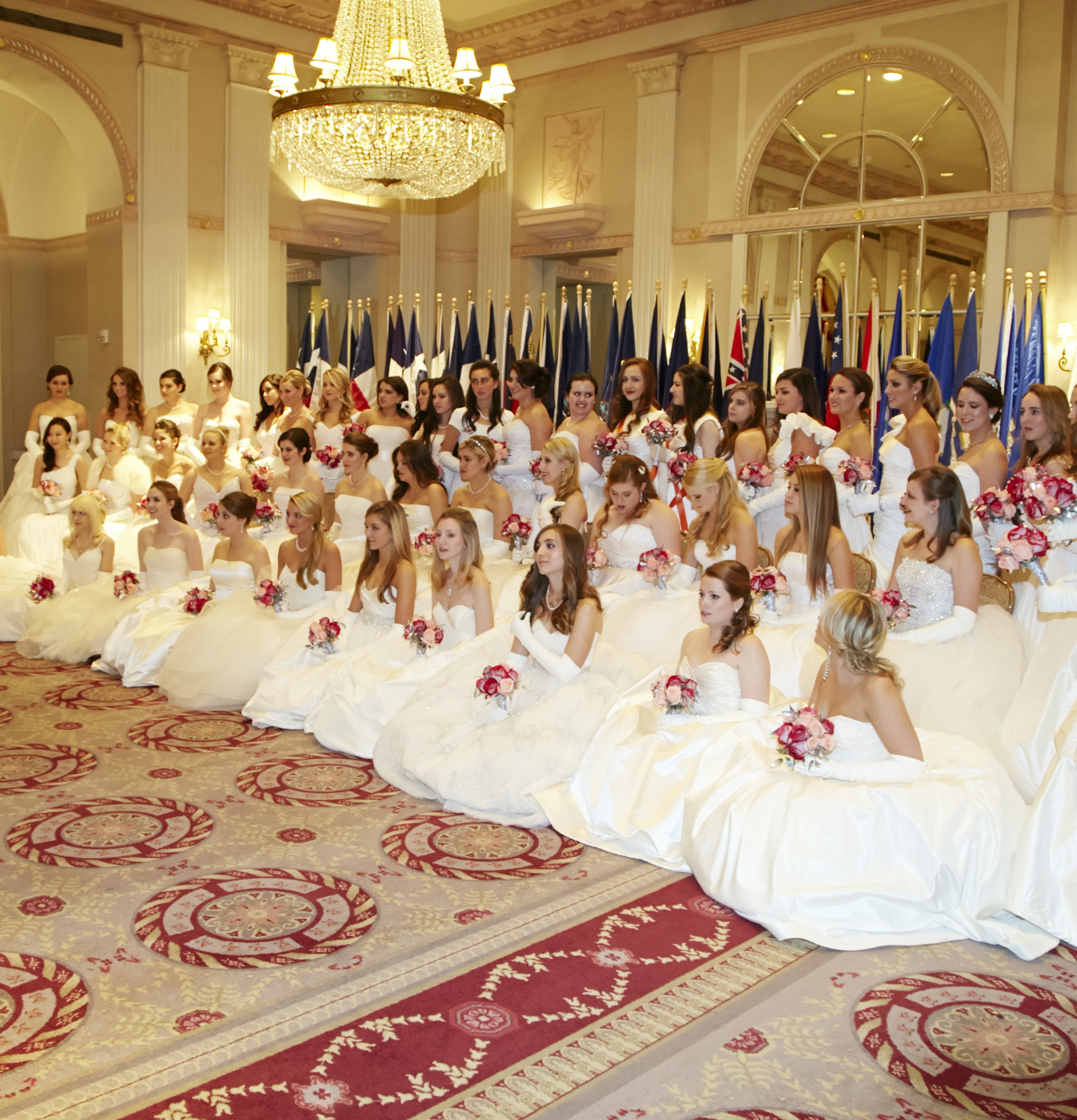
58th International Debutante Ball, 2012, New York City (Waldorf-Astoria Hotel)

The United States inherited its debutante traditions from the United Kingdom. George Washington, the first president of the newly independent country, held debutante presentations in Philadelphia and Washington, D.C. These events continued for Washington elites into the 20th century. In the Roaring Twenties, the more democratic tradition of the high school prom became popular, which is a dance where attendance is open to everyone, not merely high-status families.

Today, a cotillion or debutante ball in the United States is a formal presentation of young women, debutantes, to high society, typically hosted by a charity or society. Those introduced can vary from the ages of 16 to 18 (younger ages are more typical of Southern regions, while older are more commonplace in the North). In some areas, 15- and 16-year-olds are called "junior debutantes". Some families hold parties for their daughters alone; these "debutante parties" or "coming-out parties" might be combined with those for a small number of girls. The events are sometimes known as debutante cotillion balls and are held for middle schoolers as a chance to teach manners.

One of the most prestigious, most exclusive, and most expensive debutante balls in the world is the invitation-only International Debutante Ball held annually at the Waldorf Astoria Hotel in New York City, where girls from prominent world families are presented to high society. The International Debutante Ball has presented princesses, countesses, baronesses and many European royalty and aristocrats as debutantes to high society, including Princess Katarina of Yugoslavia, Vanessa von Bismarck (great-great-granddaughter of Otto von Bismarck), Princess Natalya Elisabeth Davidovna Obolensky (granddaughter of the Prince Ivan Obolensky, who was the Chairman of the International Debutante Ball and himself the grandson of John Jacob Astor IV – founder of the Waldorf Astoria Hotel), Princess Ines de Bourbon Parme, Countess Magdalena Habsburg-Lothringen (great-great-granddaughter of Empress Elisabeth "Sisi" of Austria) and Lady Henrietta Seymour (daughter of the Duke and Duchess of Somerset).

Daughters and granddaughters of billionaire businessmen, high-ranking politicians, such as United States presidents, senators and congressmen, and ambassadors have also been presented at the International Debutante Ball; for example, Tricia Nixon, Julie Nixon, Jennie Eisenhower, Ashley Walker Bush (granddaughter of President George H. W. Bush and niece of President George W. Bush), Lucinda Robb (granddaughter of President Lyndon B. Johnson), Christine Colby (daughter of CIA director William Colby), Hollister Knowlton, Charlotte and Catherine Forbes (granddaughters of Malcolm Forbes), and Christina Huffington (daughter of Arianna Huffington of The Huffington Post). Ivanka Trump (daughter of Donald Trump) was invited but chose not to attend.

To gain admission to a debutante ball, debutantes must usually be recommended by a distinguished committee or sponsored by an established member of élite society, typically their mothers or other female relatives. Wearing white gowns and satin or kid long gloves, the debutantes stand in a receiving line, and are introduced individually to the audience. After the debutante is announced, she is walked around the stage, guided by her father who presents her. Her younger male escort joins her and escorts her to make way for the next. Each debutante brings at least one escort, sometimes two.

Many debutante balls select escorts and pair them with the debs to promote good social pairings. Cotillions may be elaborate formal affairs and involve not only "debs" but also junior debutantes, escorts and ushers, and flower girls and pages. Every debutante must perform a curtsy, also known as the St. James Bow or a full court bow to the attendees. The exception are Texas debutantes who are presented at the International Debutante Ball at New York City's Waldorf Astoria Hotel, who perform the "Texas Dip". This gesture is made as the young woman is formally presented. Debutante balls exist in nearly every major city in the United States. They occur more frequently and are larger affairs in the American South.

The Savannah Cotillion Club's Christmas Cotillion in Savannah, Georgia, first held in 1817, is the oldest debutante ball in the United States. Many cities such as Dallas and Atlanta have several balls in a season. Dallas, for example, has a ball sponsored by the traditional Idlewild organization. Some balls sponsored by modern organizations, such as the Dallas Symphony Orchestra Presentation Ball and La Fiesta de las Seis Banderas, raise money to benefit charities.

The National Cotillion and Thanksgiving Ball of Washington, DC., hosted by Mary-Stuart Montague Price, has met every November for over 60 years with proceeds going to Children's Hospital. Debutantes can formally participate in the ball for up to three years, wearing different colors each time to express their increasing sophistication: debutantes wear white, post-debutantes wear black, and the post-post debutantes wear red.

Another "Old South" debutante ball is the St. Cecilia Society Ball held annually in Charleston, South Carolina. This ball is described in Alexandra Ripley's novel, Scarlett, the sequel to Margaret Mitchell's Gone with the Wind. The Society was formed in 1766 as a private subscription concert organization. Over the next fifty-four years, its annual concert series formed the most sophisticated musical phenomenon in North America. Its musical patronage ended in 1820. Today the St. Cecilia Society flourishes as one of South Carolina's oldest and most exclusive social institutions. Today the St. Cecilia Society hosts the annual debutante ball. The society admits only those men whose fathers or brothers are members. The women must be from these families. Other southern debutante balls include the North Carolina Debutante Ball in North Carolina and the Bal du Bois and Richmond German Christmas Dance in Virginia.

In New Orleans, Louisiana, a debutante is usually presented at a ball during the Carnival season beginning on the eve of Epiphany (holiday) also known as Twelfth Night (holiday); the old-line krewe, The Twelfth Night Revelers, hold their ball on this evening every year. As the carnival season ramps up towards Mardi Gras Day (or Fat Tuesday) balls for the non-parading krewes lead into balls for parading krewes and finally the old-line krewe families such as the Krewe of Proteus, Knights of Momus, and finally on the night of Fat Tuesday the meeting of the courts of the krewe of Rex and Mistick Krewe of Comus.

In New York City, there are still several deb balls, including the international one described above. Charity and social balls include the Infirmary (benefits the local hospital), the Society of Mayflower Descendants Ball, and the Saint Nicholas Society of the City of New York Ball (founded 1835). As an alternative to a ball, and more frequent in the North, a young woman's family might hold a "coming-out party" for her.

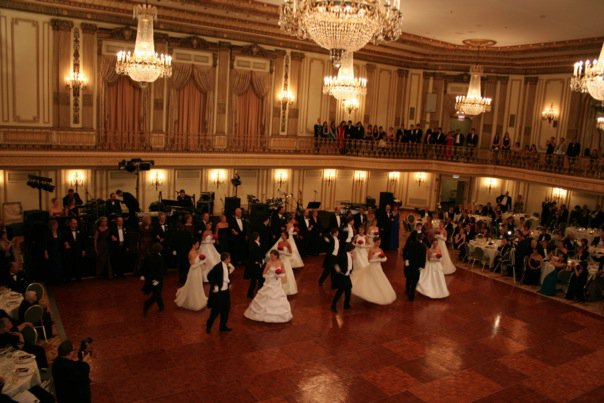
Chicago's Palmer House hotel, traditional Ukrainian American debutante ball

Unlike the formal balls, which are held during the social season in spring or summer, the individual "coming-out party" may be held at any time of the year. Some are scheduled around such occasions as the debutante's birthday, or graduation from high school or university. In theory, the only women who could be invited would be those who had already made their débuts, thus affording a sort of rank-order to the debutante season. "Old-money" families often send their preteen sons and daughters to dancing classes, called cotillion, and etiquette lessons in preparation for these parties, which launch their children into society and act as major networking events. Even less grand debutante balls typically require debs to attend a few lessons in social dance, comportment, and in executing their curtsy.

Since the early 20th century, the African-American community organized its own tradition of social organizations, some of which sponsor similar charitable events and activities. They hold their own cotillions and debutante balls for their upper classes. Successful African Americans could meet and make connections with others of their status at such events, and make social, political and economic connections for the young women and men in their families. These formal cotillion and debutante balls still thrive as among the most traditional events of the African-American upper class. An example is Les Femmes Douze, founded in 1964 in Las Vegas.

Various Ukrainian émigré organizations in the United States, such as the Ukrainian American Medical Association of North America, the Ukrainian Engineers' Society of America, Plast Ukrainian Scouting Organization, and the Ukrainian American Youth Association have hosted annual black-tie debutante balls since after the Second World War. They are used to raise funds for charities and to introduce young Ukrainian ladies between the ages of 16 and 18 to their local ethnic Ukrainian communities. Ukrainian American debutante balls take place in American cities with substantial populations of Ukrainians, such as Chicago, Detroit, Philadelphia, Newark, and Washington, D.C. Beside the traditional waltz of the debutantes, one of the highlights of these balls is the Kolomyjka, which usually takes place past midnight. Every guest may spontaneously demonstrate their skills in Ukrainian dances, such as the Hopak or Arkan. Kolomyjka dances tend to last upwards of a half-hour of nonstop folk dancing. Afterward traditional black-tie ball dances are revived.

The dress code is white tie and tails for men, and strictly floor-length pure white ball gown for women. Long white gloves are commonly worn by female debutantes and are considered a symbol of upper-class femininity.

=== Debutante balls in American television and films ===
Several television series focused on young people from wealthy families include episodes with debutante events. "The Debut," an episode of The O.C. (a drama about wealthy Californians), featured a representation of an American debutante ball. Gossip Girl featured multiple episodes about debutante balls in New York City, including "Hi, Society," (season 1, episode 10), "They Shoot Humphreys, Don't They?," (season 3, episode 9), "Riding in Town Cars with Boys (season 5, episode 10), and "Monstrous Ball" (season 6, episode 5). "Presenting Lorelai Gilmore", an episode of Gilmore Girls shows Rory Gilmore as a debutante. She makes her debut at a Daughters of the American Revolution (DAR) debutante ball that her grandmother helped put together. In The Critic, Jay Sherman's younger sister Margo is persuaded to attend her debutante ball. In BoJack Horseman, the titular character's mother, Beatrice, is shown attending her debutante ball as a young adult through flashbacks in the season 4 episode "Time's Arrow".

In the premiere of The City, Whitney Port's reality show, her co-worker Olivia Palermo describes her first pair of Manolo Blahnik shoes, which she wore to her "Deb" at the age of 18. The first season of The Summer I Turned Pretty revolves around the town's annual debutante ball, a plot that was not present in the book series it was based on.

Crime dramas have investigated début-related crimes. "Zoo York," an episode of CSI: NY, featured the CSI team investigating the murder of a debutante. Medical examiner Evan Zao says that he had attended a debutante ball. "Debut", an episode of Cold Case, tells the story of a young girl who is murdered the night of her debutante ball. In an episode of Law & Order: Special Victims Unit, entitled "Streetwise", detectives investigated the murder of a debutante.

Films with debutante themes include Metropolitan (1990), Whit Stillman's feature film, a comedy of manners set during the deb season in Manhattan, and What a Girl Wants (2003), in which Amanda Bynes plays an American teen whose estranged father is a British lord, and who is presented at a coming-out party. Bynes is also featured in She's the Man, in which the main character attends a debutantes preparation program and finally a ball. Something New, a romantic comedy, has a scene of upper-class African Americans at a cotillion on the West Coast. The Debut (2001), a film on contemporary Filipino-American life, explores a wide variety of cultural themes through an informal debutante event.

The 1991 film The Addams Family is centered on the reconciliation of Gomez and Fester Addams. They had a falling out as teenagers at a debutante ball. In the film Little Women (1994), a "coming-out" party is given. Aunt March talks to Marmee about when Meg will be introduced into society.

Borat Subsequent Moviefilm (2020) includes a scene at a debutante ball at Johnston–Felton–Hay House in Macon, Georgia.

Season 3, Episode 14 of the TV series Elsbeth, entitled "Deadutante", is focused on the solving of a murder committed at the Empire City Debutante Ball in New York City. The episode aired on April 2, 2026.

== Latin America ==
In Colombia, Mexico, Dominican Republic, Panama, Puerto Rico and Paraguay, debutantes are young girls who take part in a Festival de Debutantes, or a "Quince Años", held for their fifteenth birthdays. Quinceañera parties are also held in the United States among some Latino communities from these nations.

In Brazil and Mexico, such events are called Baile de Debutante (Spanish and Portuguese) or Festa de Debutante (only Portuguese), or Quince Años (Spanish) or Quinze Anos (Portuguese).

In Panama, the Debutante Ball is organized by Damas Guadalupanas. It is a charity event held at Club Union. It takes place when girls are seniors in high school (17–18 years old). This follows the Quince Años, which takes place when they are 15.

== See also ==
- Azalea Trail Maids
- Bachelor and Spinster Ball
- Beauty pageant
- Celebutante
- Coming of Age Day
- Cug Huê Hng
- Debutante dress
- International Debutante Ball
- List of debutante balls in the United States
- Philippine debut
- Social Register
- Socialite
- Southern belle
- Sweet Sixteen
- Texas dip
- Vienna Opera Ball
- Veiled Prophet Ball
