= El Aguajito, Sinaloa =

El Aguajito
- Village
- Location within Mexico
- Coordinates: 25°16′0″N 107°27′0″W
- Country: Mexico
- State: Sinaloa

Population
  - Total: 100

El Aguajito is a small town in the state of Sinaloa in Mexico. It lies within a large forested area in the highlands of the state west of the Sierra Madre Occidental Mountains.

== Physical environment ==
The climate in this region of the state of Sinaloa is moderate, but humid. The temperatures throughout the year vary between 40 and 100 °F (4 and 38 °C). Rains come to this area during the summer months, and along the highest temperatures of the year.

The area serves as home to numerous species of animals ranging from harmless insects to venomous snakes to large animals used in agriculture. The species of animals include tarantulas, venomous scorpions, several species of whip scorpions, many types of lizards, bees, wasps, bats, rattle snakes, vipers, horses, mules, burros, cows, goats, pigs among many others.

== Politics ==
The town had about 200 inhabitants, but about half of them emigrated to the United States. El Aguajito is not recognized by the government as an entity of its own; instead, it forms part of the bordering town of Los Troncones. The inhabitants, however, refuse to form part of Los Troncones because there are rivalries among families from the two towns.

== Facilities ==
The town has two convenience stores, known as abarrotes. They are both located on the main road, which is called El Camino Real, which is Spanish for Royal Road. One of these abarrotes also serves as an afternoon restaurant on the weekends. The menu consists of simple item such as hot dogs and tortas (a Mexican-style sandwich). It also serves as an entertainment place with its own little arcade where the children go to spend their time.

The town has one school which serves the secondary grades (equivalent to grades 7 to 9 in the United States). The nearest elementary school is in the nearby town of Los Troncones, and the nearest high school, or preparatory school, is located in the town of El Palmar, several miles from El Aguajito.

== Economy ==
The main source of income for the people of this town is money transfers that originate from those residing in the United States. There are, however, those who still prefer to farm corn, beans, peanuts, and tomatoes among other crops.

== Cultural life ==
The only inhabitants that remain are the elderly and some women and children. However, come the holidays of December, and the town comes to life again. Many people return to this town to spend Christmas and New Years with their family members. There are also numerous celebrations during this time because many people decide to marry or have quinceaneras (coming of age celebrations) during these two exciting weeks. The days before Christmas and the days between Christmas and New Years are reserved for these celebrations regardless of the day of the week.
