= Drum major backbend =

American marching band salute

The drum major backbend is an elaborate salute performed by drum majors in many American university marching bands. It is executed prior to college football games as one of the rituals engaging the audience's consent for the athletic contest that follows. It is distinct from the gymnastics maneuver of the same name.

== Cultural significance ==
The drum major of the Ohio State University performs a backbend in 2016.

Folklorist Danille Lindquist has described the drum major backbend, and the audience reaction that accompanies it in the form of cheering and applause, as part of a series of rituals associated with college football designed to seek and elicit popular consent for the staging of the athletic contest that follows.

== Use ==
Drum major backbends are executed by bending the body backwards to be parallel to the ground and at a low enough depth so as to touch the top of the headgear to the field, without the knees also touching. They are particularly associated with marching bands of historically black colleges and universities (HBCU), but are also widely performed elsewhere.

The Ohio State University Marching Band (OSUMB) began executing a drum major backbend in the late 1950s with Lenny Hart being the first such person to do so. In 2016, OSUMB drum major Nate MacMaster described the backbend to Rolling Stone as the "most crucial moment" of game day. In the 1960s, the drum major of the University of Michigan Marching Band began performing a backbend, which was modified to a more elaborate backbend in 1993 by then drum major Matthew Pickus. This later version was achieved by removing the busby, thereby forcing an inversion of the spine so that the head comes into direct contact with the ground. According to the University of Michigan, Pickus began removing his busby after a fan criticized the depth of one of his previous backbends.

In addition to HBCUs, the Ohio State University, and the University of Michigan, other marching bands whose drum majors perform a backbend include the University of Illinois Marching Illini, the University of Minnesota, the University of Nebraska-Lincoln, the University of Pittsburgh, the University of Iowa, Michigan State University, Indiana University, the University of California, Berkeley, the University of Cincinnati, and others.

=== OU "strut" ===
The drum major of the University of Oklahoma (OU) uses a highly modified backbend that involves only a partial inversion of the torso, held in place while simultaneously executing an elongated and affected fast walk across the field, known as "the strut". According to an OU drum major, up until 1984 "the strut" would be performed with a complete inversion so that the head touched the field.

== Gallery ==
A Michigan State University drum major performing a backbend.

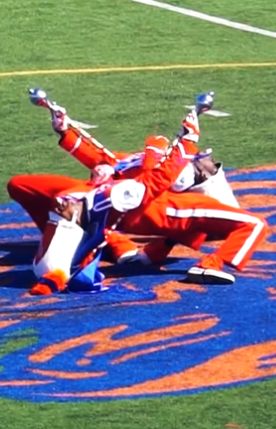
Two drum majors of Savannah State University perform simultaneous backbends.

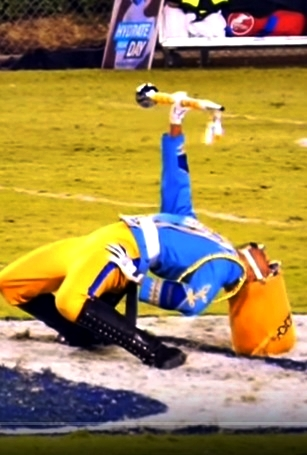
The Southern University drum major performs a backbend.

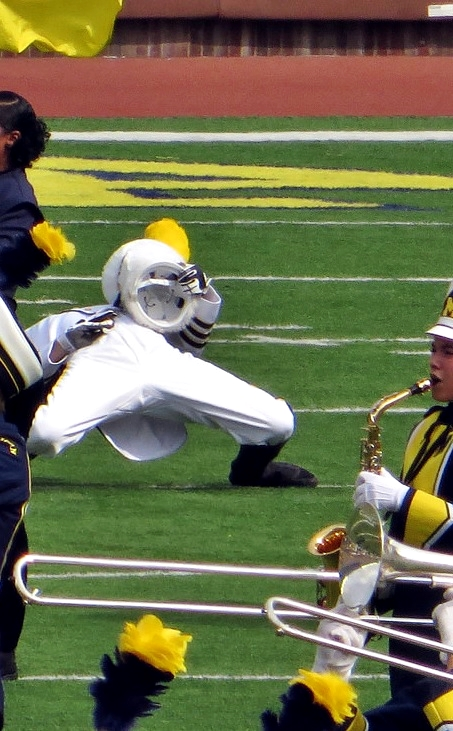
The University of Michigan drum major performs a backbend in 2015.

== See also ==
- The ludi and munus, a performance preceding gladiator contests in Rome
- Texas dip, a form of public prostration performed by debutantes in Texas
