= Texas dip =

Form of curtsey

The Texas dip is a form of elaborate curtsey and prostration performed in Texas during debutante balls. It involves the woman extending her arms completely to either side and lowering herself fully so that one knee touches the floor while simultaneously bowing her head to the side so that her left ear touches her lap. The Texas dip is believed to have originated in about 1909.

== See also ==
- Drum major backbend
- Kowtow
- Debutante
