= Curtsy =

Traditional gesture in which a female lowers her knees

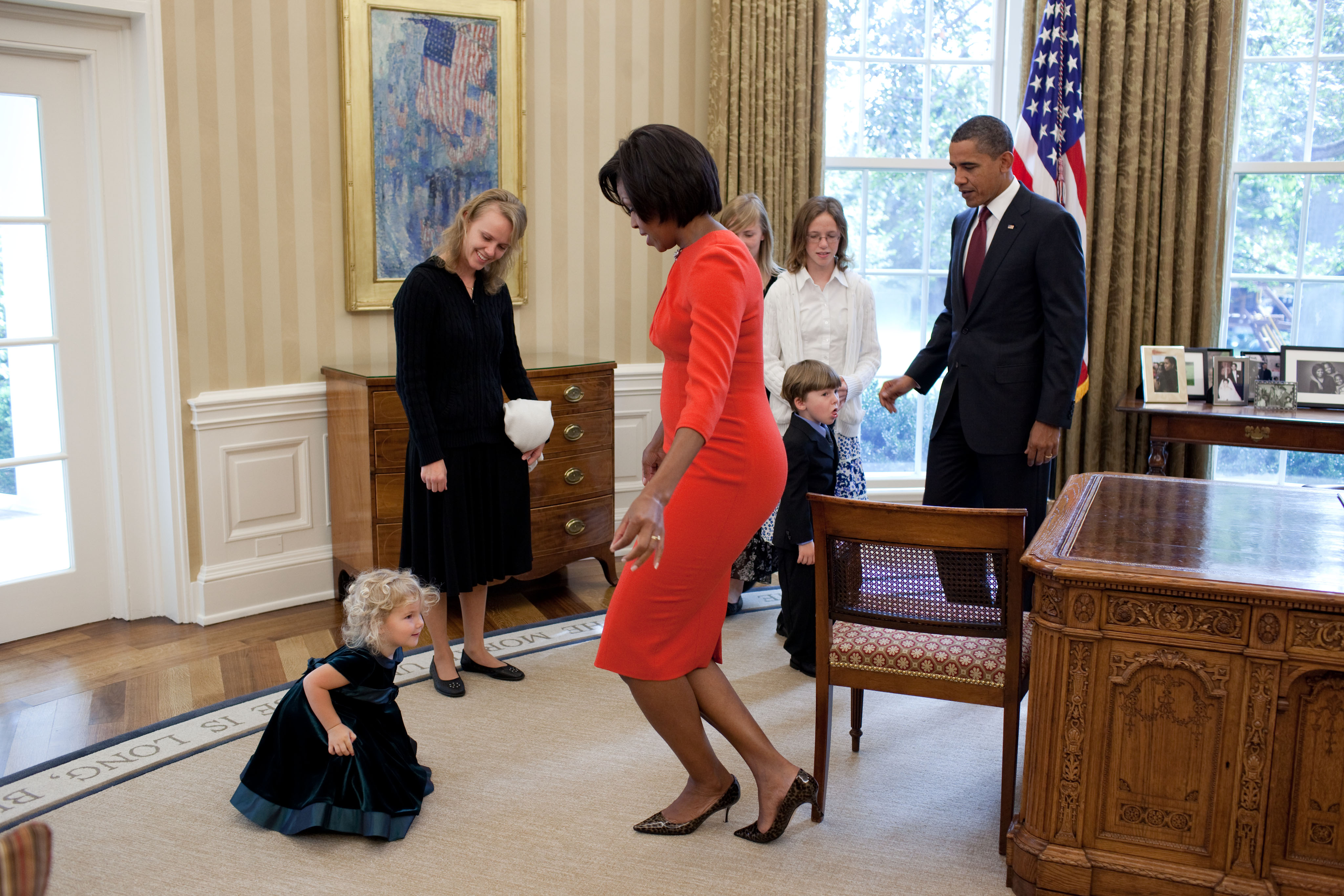
United States First Lady Michelle Obama with a young girl curtsying at the White House on October 6, 2010.

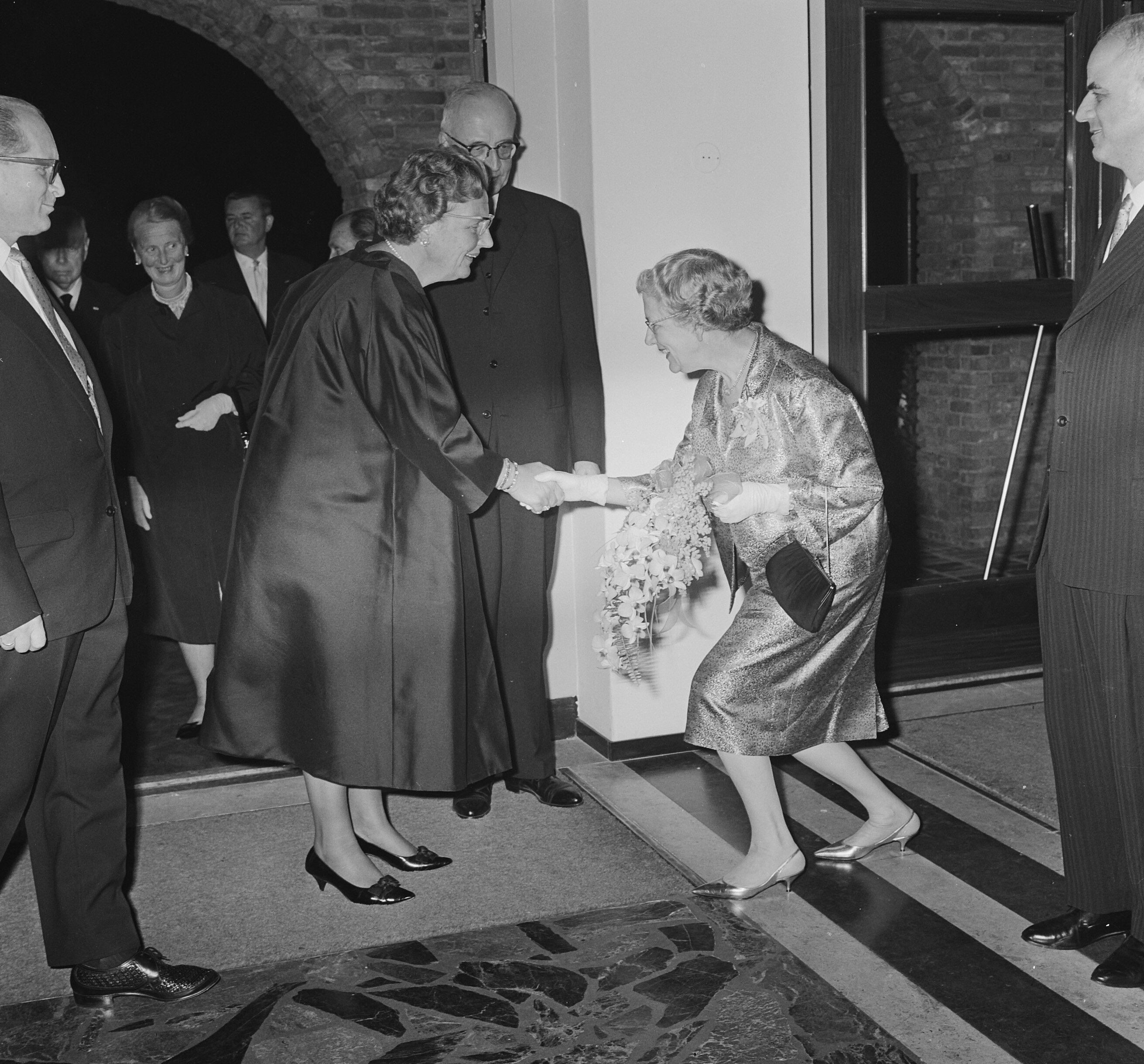
The wife of Rotterdam mayor Gerard van Walsum curtsying to Queen Juliana of the Netherlands, September 23, 1964.

A curtsy (also spelled curtsey or incorrectly as courtsey) is a traditional gendered gesture of greeting, in which a girl or woman bends her knees while bowing her head. In Western culture, it is the feminine equivalent of bowing by males, and people will commonly curtsy in some churches as a simplified genuflection.

By the 17th and 18th centuries, it had become a standard social custom for women when greeting superiors, royalty, nobility, aristocracy or elders in the Western world.

The word "curtsy" is a phonological change from "courtesy" known in linguistics as syncope.

In more formal variants of the curtsy, the girl/woman bends the knees outward (rather than straight ahead), often sweeping one foot behind her. She may also use her hands to hold her skirt out from her body. It is also acceptable in some cultures for the female to curtsy if wearing trousers or shorts.

== History ==
The origins of the curtsy can be traced back to royal court customs in Medieval Europe. Courtly dance and etiquette manuals from the Renaissance describe movements of "women dipping one knee and lowering the body" that evolved into the curtsy. Italy and France under the Valois were central in codifying this gesture.

By the Elizabethan era (1558–1603), court etiquette grew increasingly elaborate. While men were expected to perform deep bows or kneel in deference, women began adopting the curtsy as a gendered alternative, often assisted by the wide farthingale skirts which emphasized the downward motion. According to Desmond Morris, the motions involved in the curtsy and the bow were similar until the 17th century, and the sex differentiation between the actions developed afterwards. The earlier, combined version is still performed by Restoration comedy actors.

By the 1600s, during the Baroque era the curtsy became more widely codified in monarchies like France, Britain, Spain, Austria, or Russia, particularly under monarchs like Louis XIV and Charles I. At the Palace of Versailles, rituals of etiquette including deep curtsies to royalty were embedded into daily life as part of a strict court hierarchy. A lesser but still noticeable curtsy was expected when meeting nobles like dukes/duchesses or counts/countesses, particularly in formal contexts like court gatherings or balls.

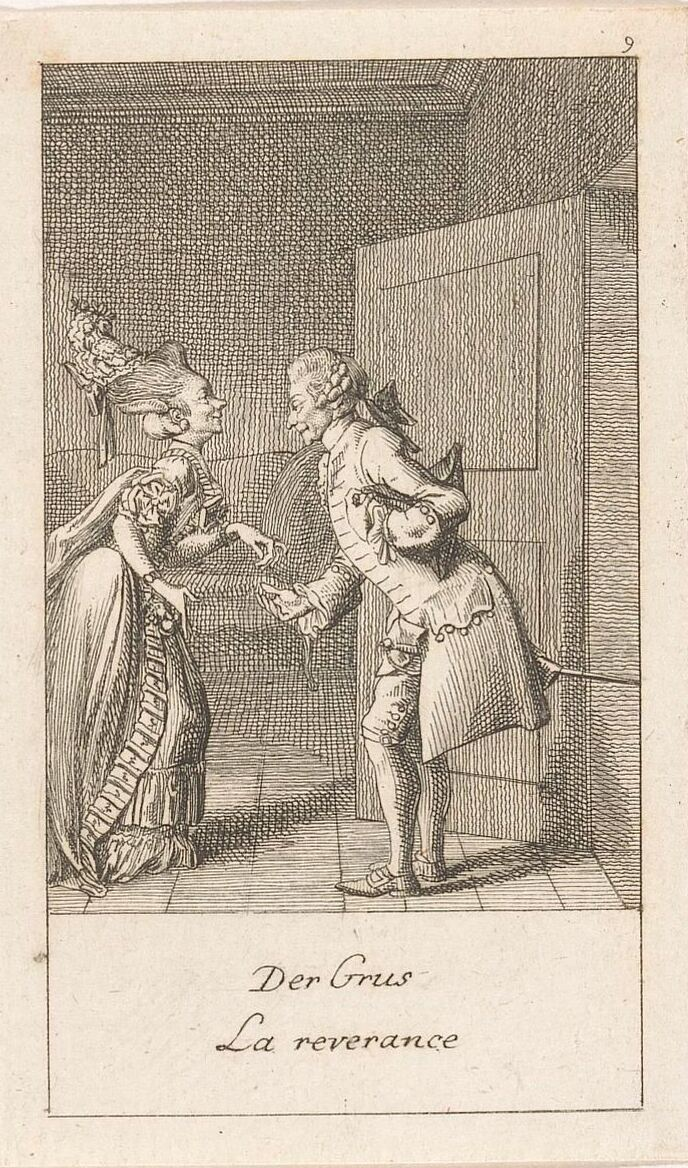
A Dutch print illustrating the "La reverence (curtsy)" by Georg Christoph Lichtenberg, 1779.

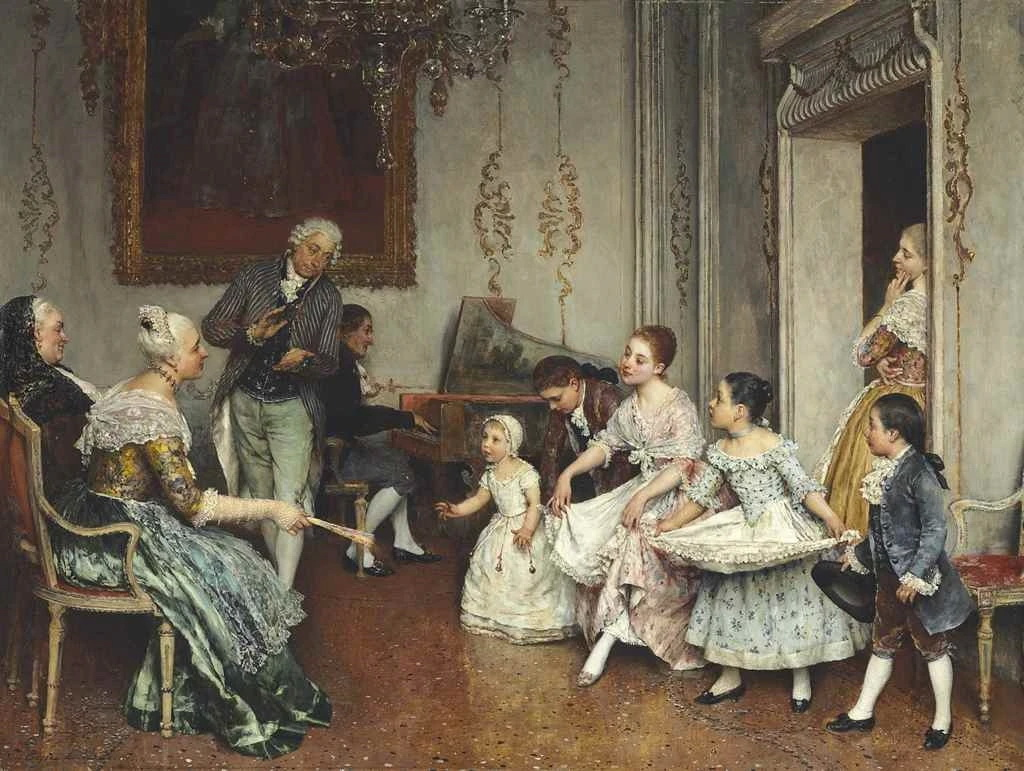
"The Introduction" (1883) by Eugene de Blaas

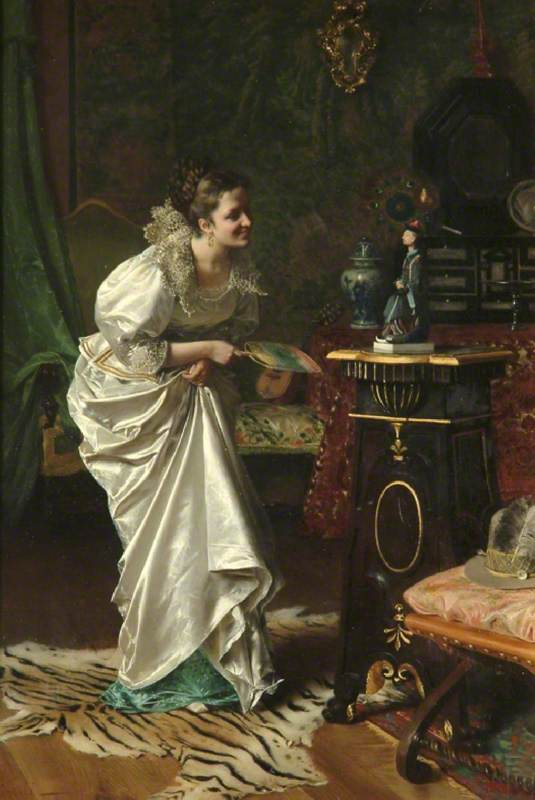
"Paying Her Respects to His High Mightiness" by Tito Conti, 1883

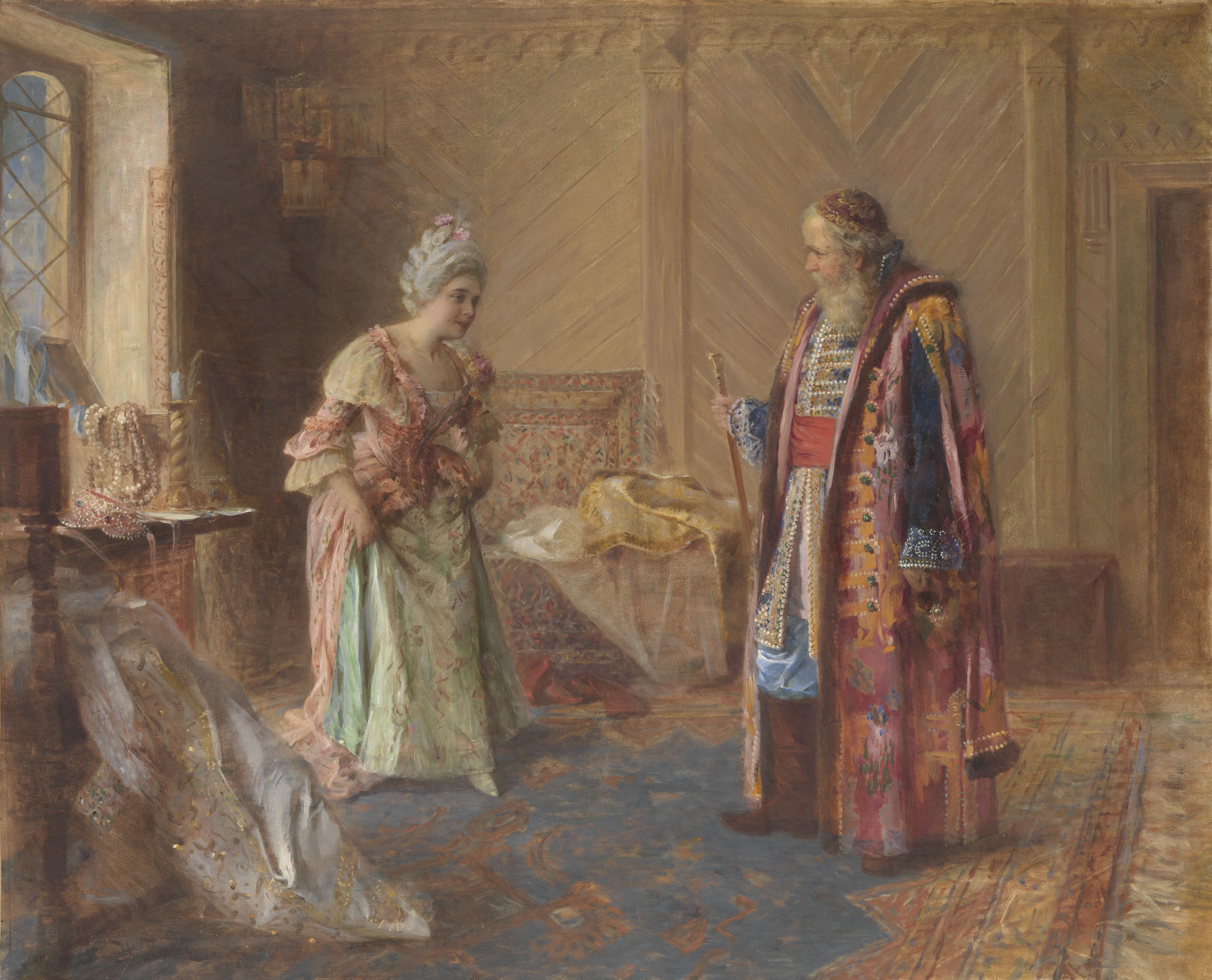
"The First Curtsey" by Israel Pass

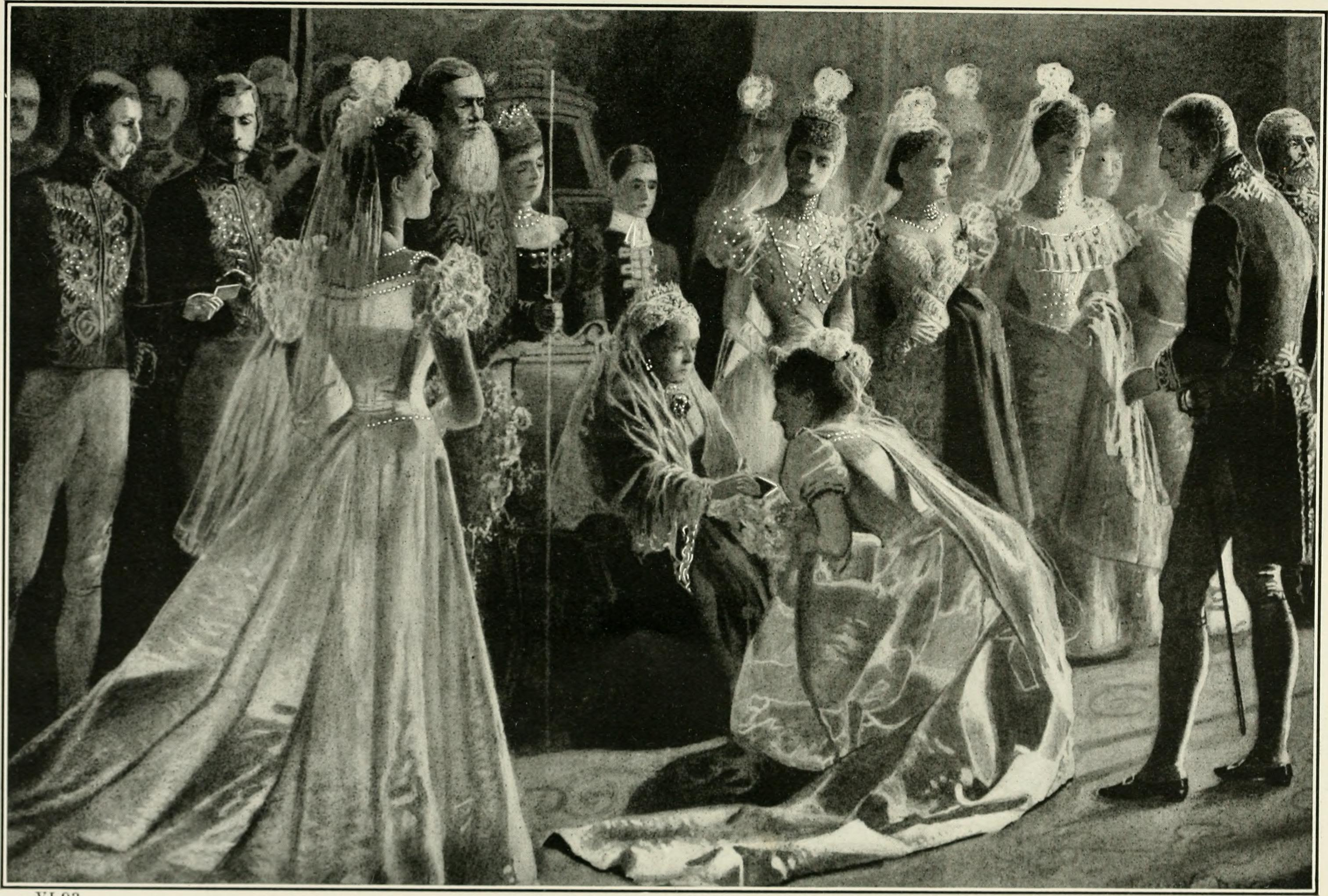
An English print illustrating a lady curtsying to Queen Victoria, 1913

In 18th-century Britain, during the Georgian era, the curtsy had become a standard part of feminine etiquette. Girls from aristocratic and upper-middle-class families were trained in deportment schools, where curtsying was taught alongside posture and comportment. In Colonial America, American colonist women of elite families were taught the curtsy. Diaries and etiquette manuals from the colonial period mention young girls practicing the “courtesy” (older spelling) when being introduced or attending church.

In the Victorian era, when women wore floor-length, hooped skirts, they curtsied using the plié movement borrowed from second-position in classical ballet in which the knees are bent while the back is held straight. Both feet and knees point out so the torso lowers straight down. This way, the lady lowers herself evenly and not to one side. Traditionally, women and girls curtsy for those of senior social rank just as men and boys bow. Today this practice has become less common. In Victorian courts, the curtsy was done as a signal for courtship availability, and social status dominance or submissiveness, in order to be successful socially. Further, some female domestic workers curtsy for their employers.

In the United States, enslaved African and African American women were often expected to curtsy when addressing or passing white masters, mistresses, or other figures of authority until the abolition of slavery in 1863. Enslaved people were compelled to use body language and curtsying was one of the expected gestures, especially when entering a room, serving food, or greeting a white mistresses.

By the 18th–19th centuries, outside formal court culture, the practice in everyday life was less rigid. People still curtsied/bowed to landlords, patrons, and social superiors, but it might be more of a polite nod or small dip than a dramatic movement.

=== Decline ===
The French Revolution (1789-1799) and later World War I (1914–1918) destroyed much of Europe’s traditional class order. Aristocratic households shrank or disappeared and the elaborate codes of conduct associated with courts and the landed elite became less relevant as the political power of the nobility eroded.

In the interwar years, combined with women’s suffrage movements, a democratic ethos in social life was on the rise. Domestic service lost prestige and manpower since many women entered factories, offices, and nursing. The idea of visibly "submitting" to another person began to feel inappropriate in more middle-class and professional settings.

By the mid-20th century, handshakes and verbal greetings had largely replaced bows and curtsies in Western social life, alongside the abolition of seven European monarchies following World War II.

== Today ==
Today, the curtsy survives in limited ceremonial contexts and it retains a formal and symbolic role in royal protocol especially in the constitutional monarchies in Europe and the commonwealth.

Women are often expected to curtsy when meeting monarchs or members of the royal family. The rules of curtsying in such contexts vary depending on country, rank, and the specific expectations of each royal household.

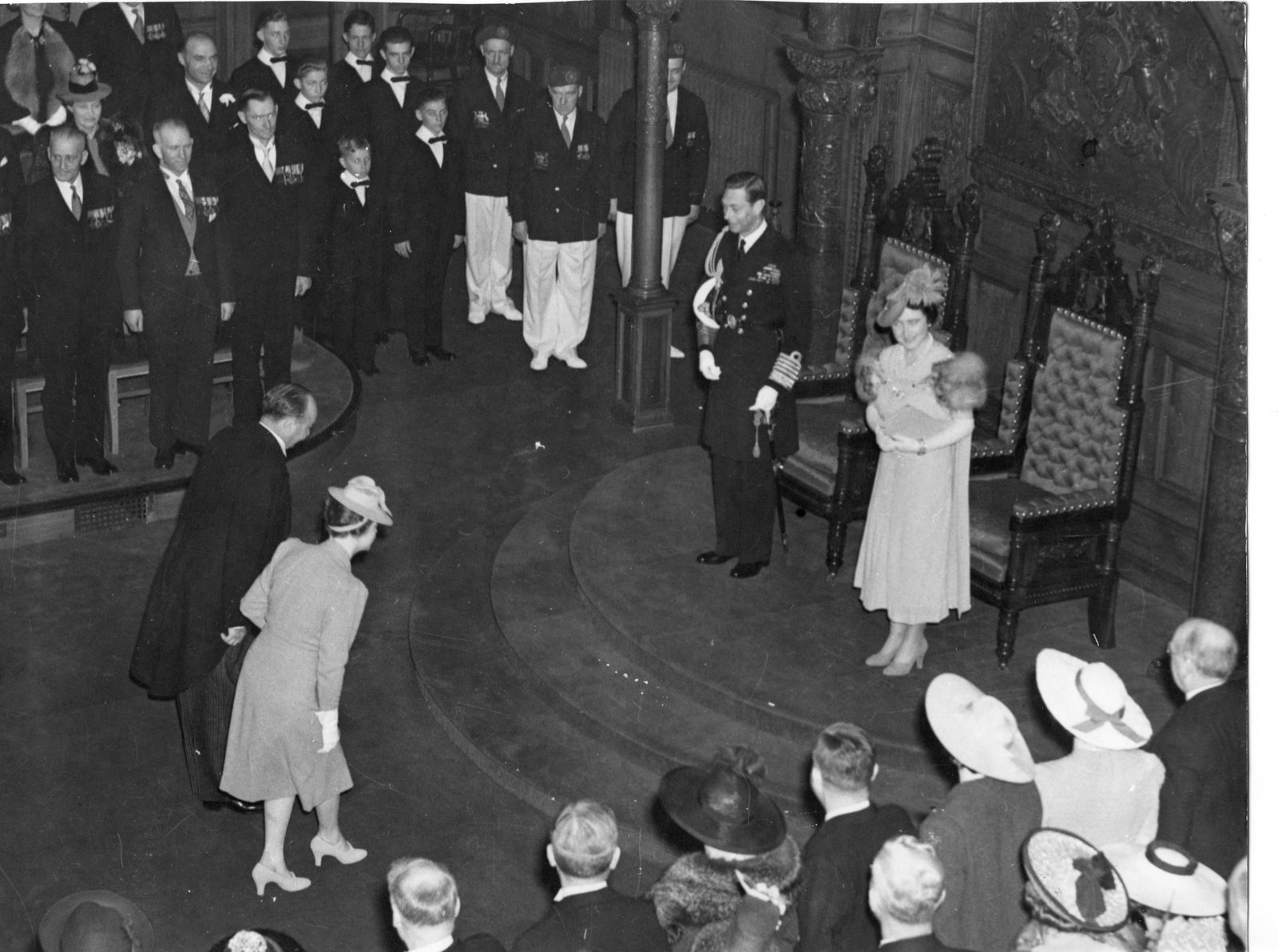
The wife of Premier of Ontario Mitchell Hepburn curtsying to King George VI and Queen Elizabeth in the Ontario Legislature in Toronto, May 1939

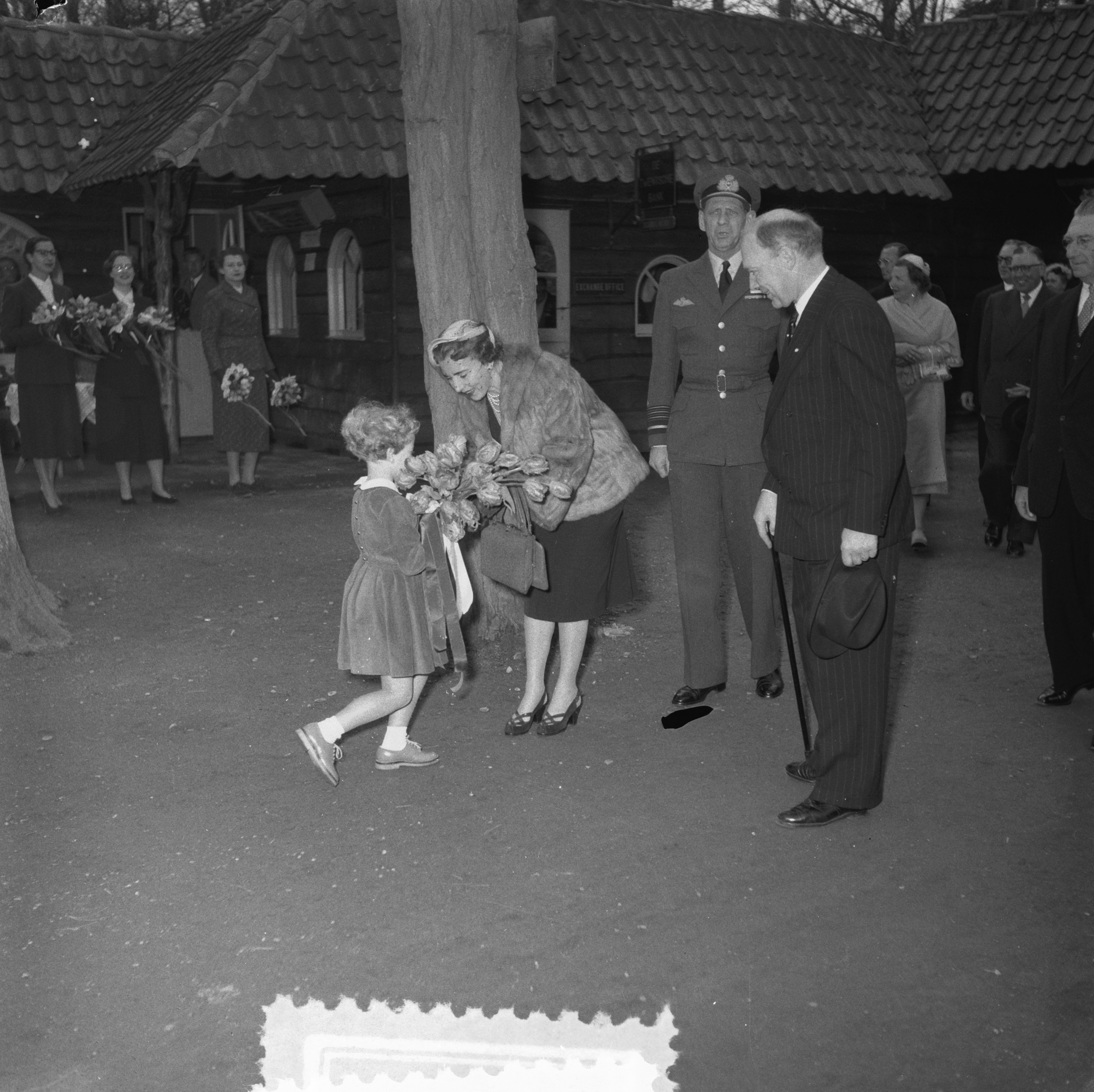
A young Dutch girl presenting flowers to Ingrid of Sweden at Keukenhof, the Netherlands, April 1954.

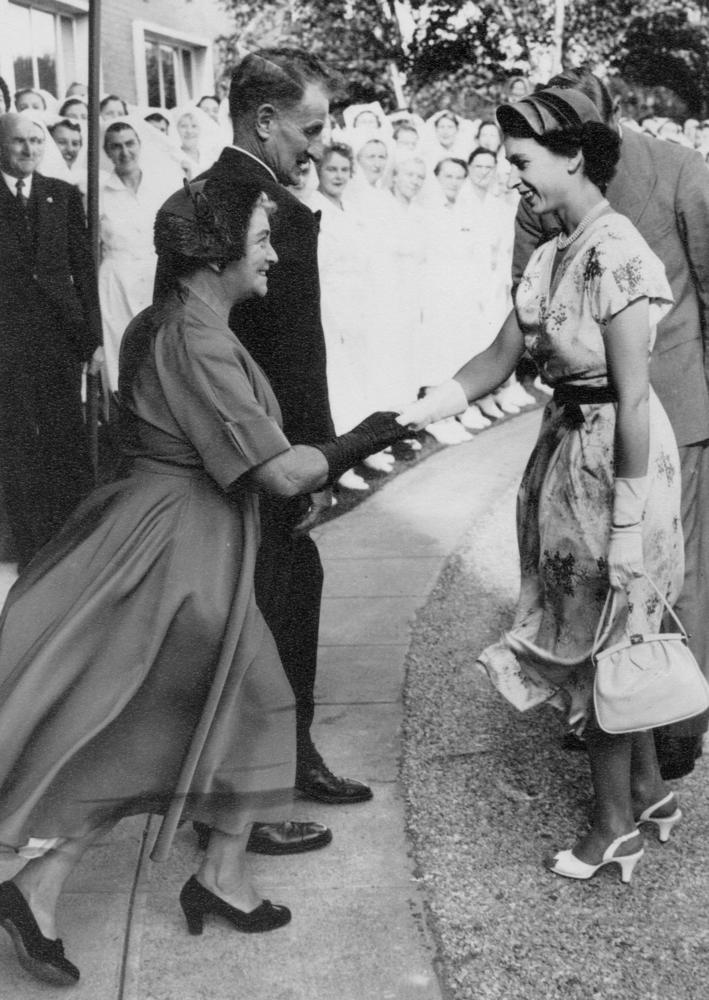
The wife of Australian politician Walter Cooper curtsying to Queen Elizabeth II, 1954.

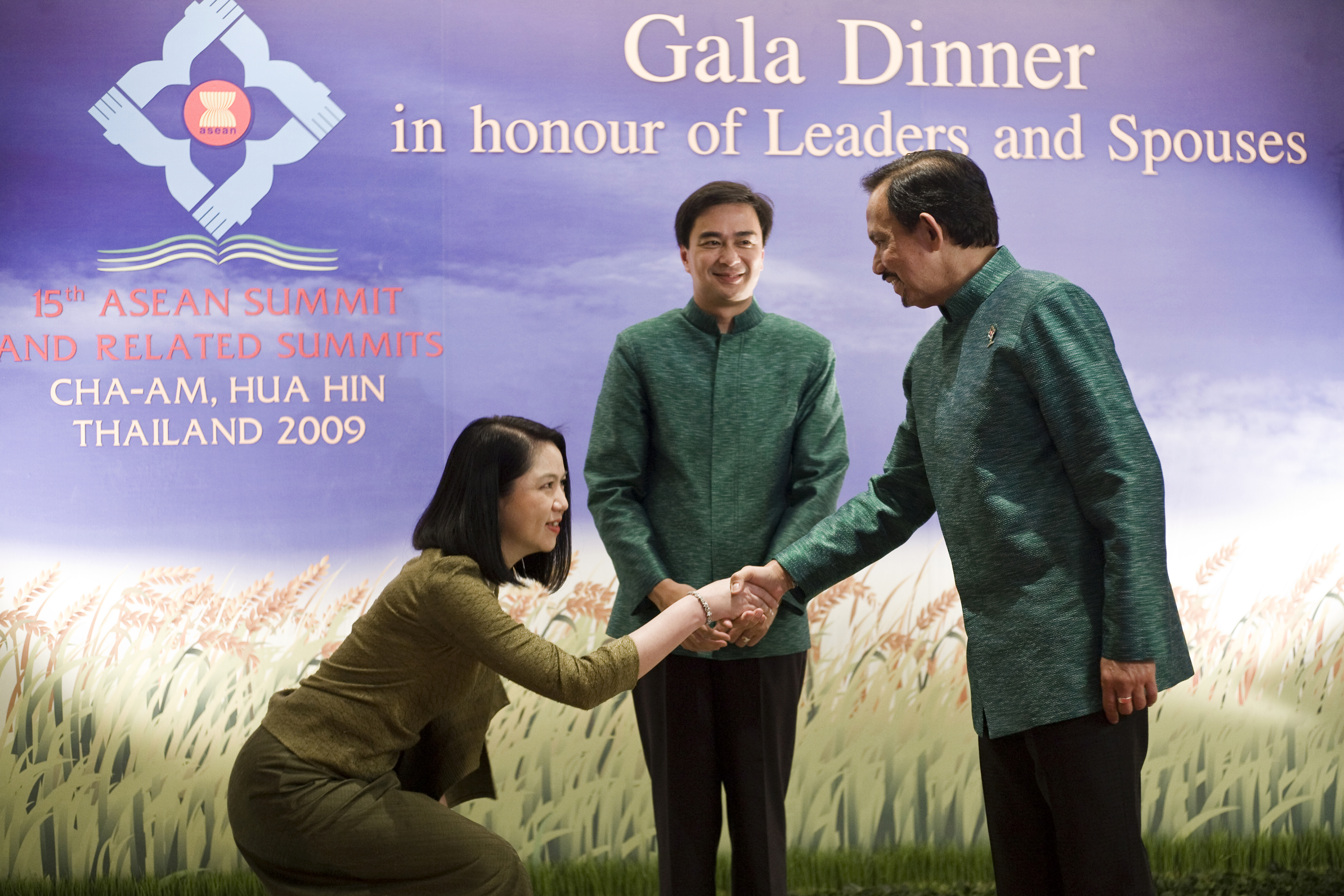
The wife of then-Prime Minister of Thailand Abhisit Vejjajiva curtsying to Hassanal Bolkiah, 2009.

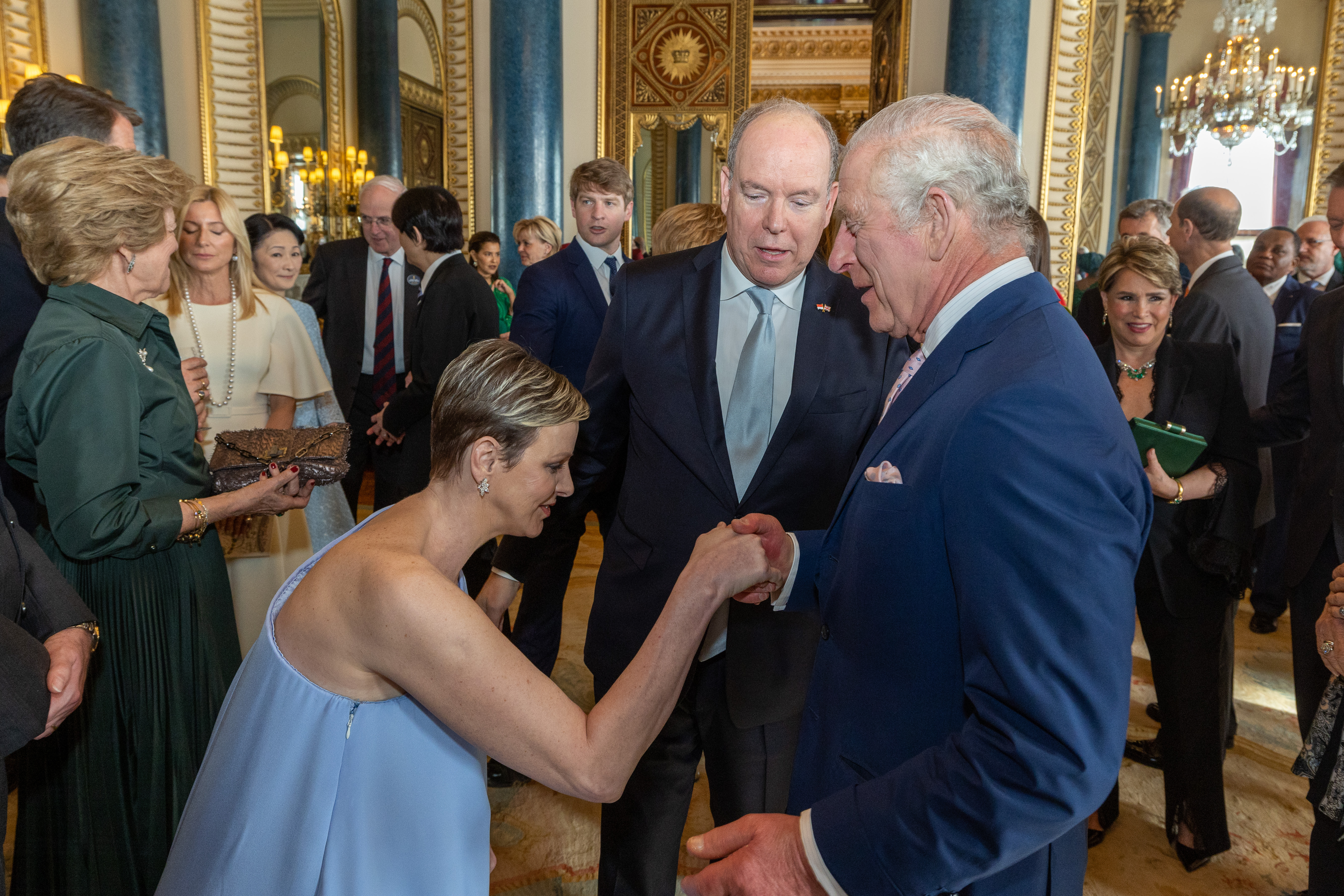
Princess Charlene of Monaco curtsying to King Charles III.

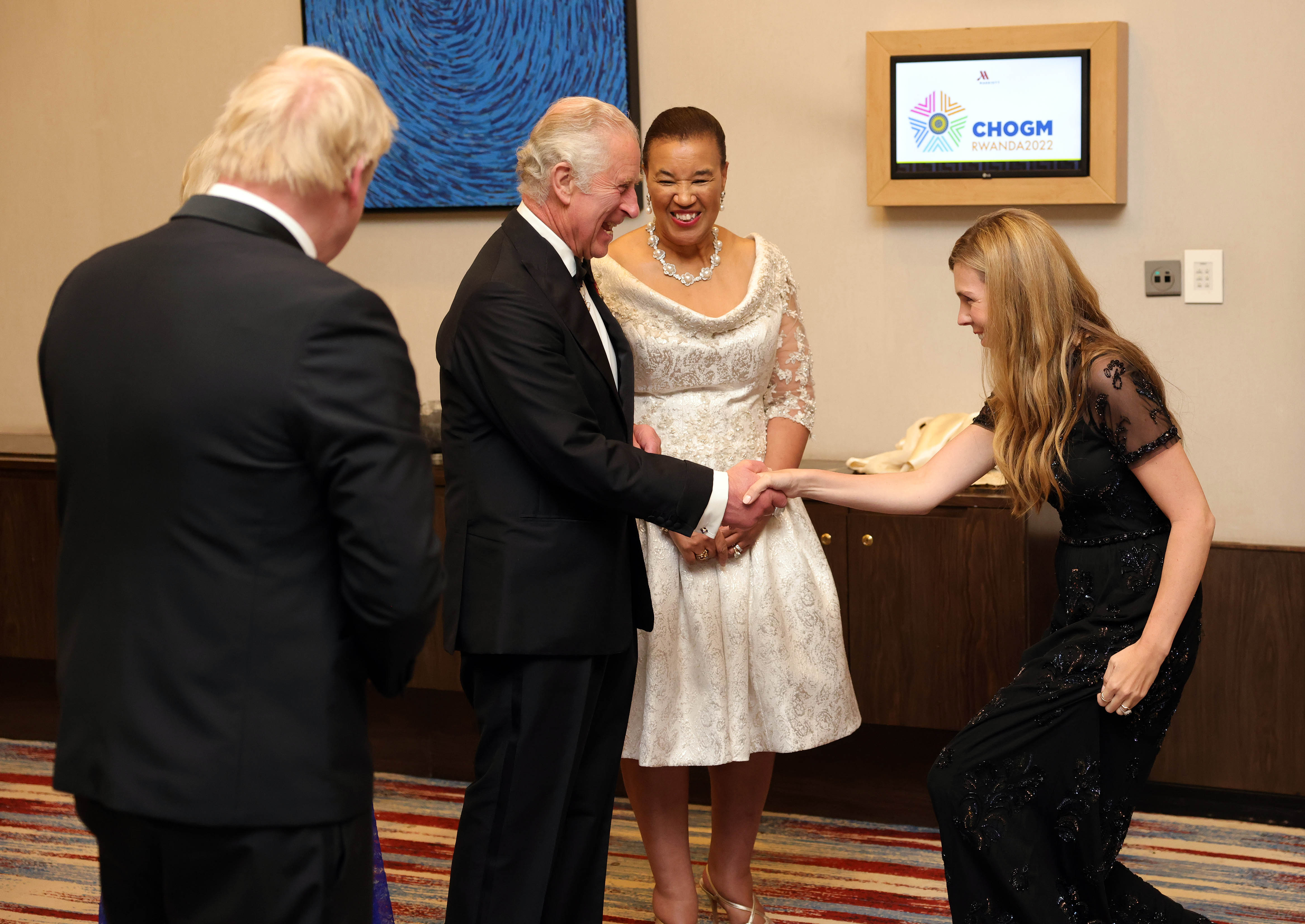
Carrie Johnson, wife of former British Prime Minister Boris Johnson, curtsies to Charles, Prince of Wales, 2022.

During her coronation, Queen Elizabeth II performed a curtsy, or rather a half-curtsy, half-neck bow to King Edward's Chair.

During the funeral of Diana, Princess of Wales the Queen bowed her head in a half-curtsey as the Princess's coffin passed her.

== Dance ==
By the Baroque era curtsy also plays a significant role in dance, both as a performative gesture and a part of formal etiquette in the dance world. Dance masters and etiquette instructors taught noble girls to perform "reverences" (French for curtsy), often in tandem with social dancing lessons.

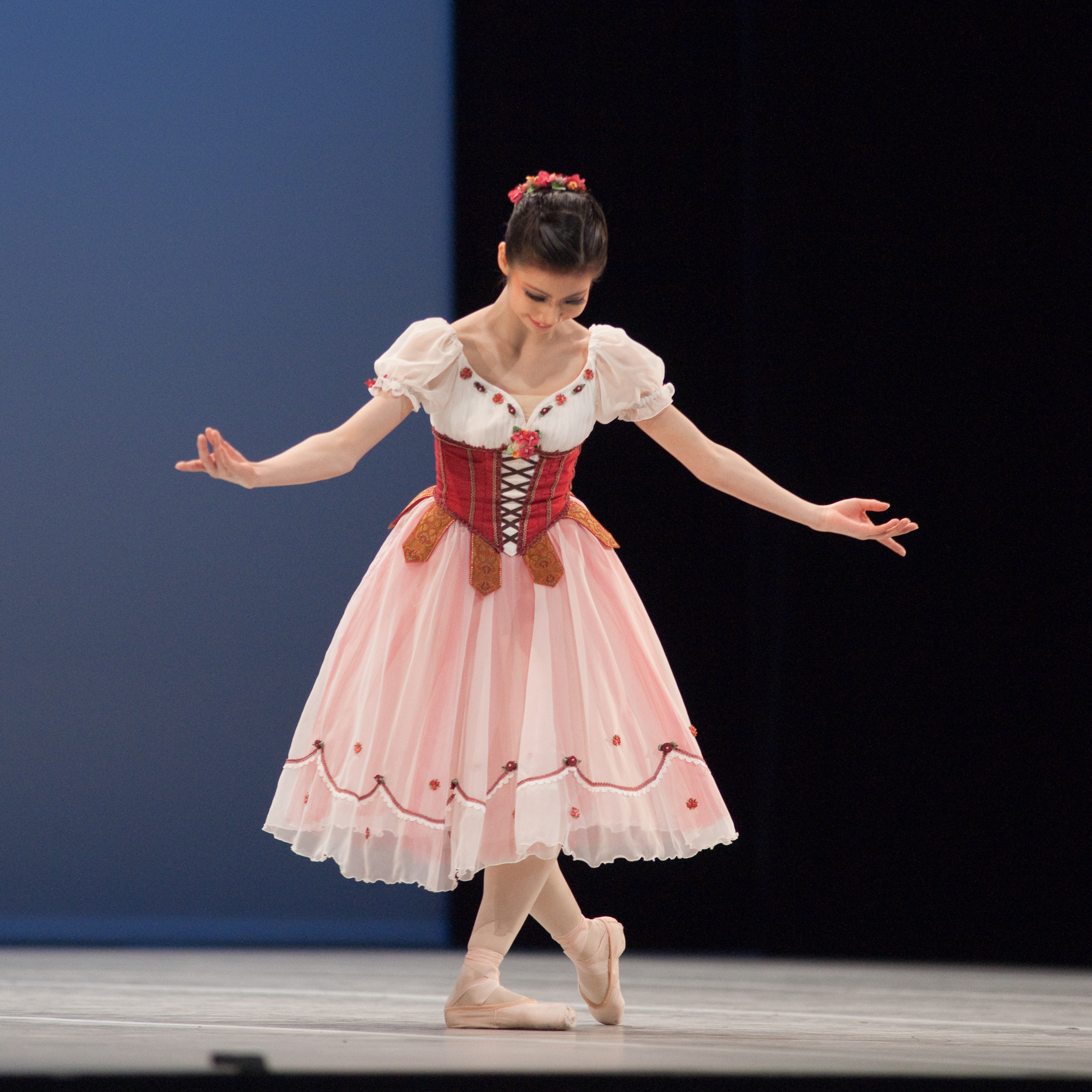
A ballet dancer curtsying

Female dancers often curtsy at the end of a performance to show gratitude or to acknowledge applause from the audience. At the end of a ballet class, students will also curtsy or bow to the teacher and pianist to show gratitude. According to Victorian dance etiquette, a woman curtsies before beginning a dance. Female Scottish highland dancers performing the national dances and the Irish jig also curtsy (at both the beginning and end for the national dances and at the end for the Irish jig). Some female ballroom dancers will curtsy to their partners before beginning the Viennese Waltz.

It is also common for female square dancers to curtsy as a method of greeting their male dance partners prior to the dance, while her partner bows. This square dancing practice is called "Honor your partner." Female cloggers also sometimes curtsy at the end of their performance.

It is customary for female figure skaters to curtsy at the end of their performances at figure skating competitions or shows.

The "Texas dip" is an extreme curtsy performed by a Texan debutante. The young woman slowly lowers her forehead towards the floor by crossing her ankles, then bending her knees and sinking. The escort's hand is held during the dip. When the debutante's head nears the floor, she turns her head sideways, averting the risk of soiling her dress with lipstick.

== See also ==
- Genuflection
- Kneeling
- Partial squat
