= National Debutante Cotillion and Thanksgiving Ball =

Annual dance and debutante presentation in Washington, DC

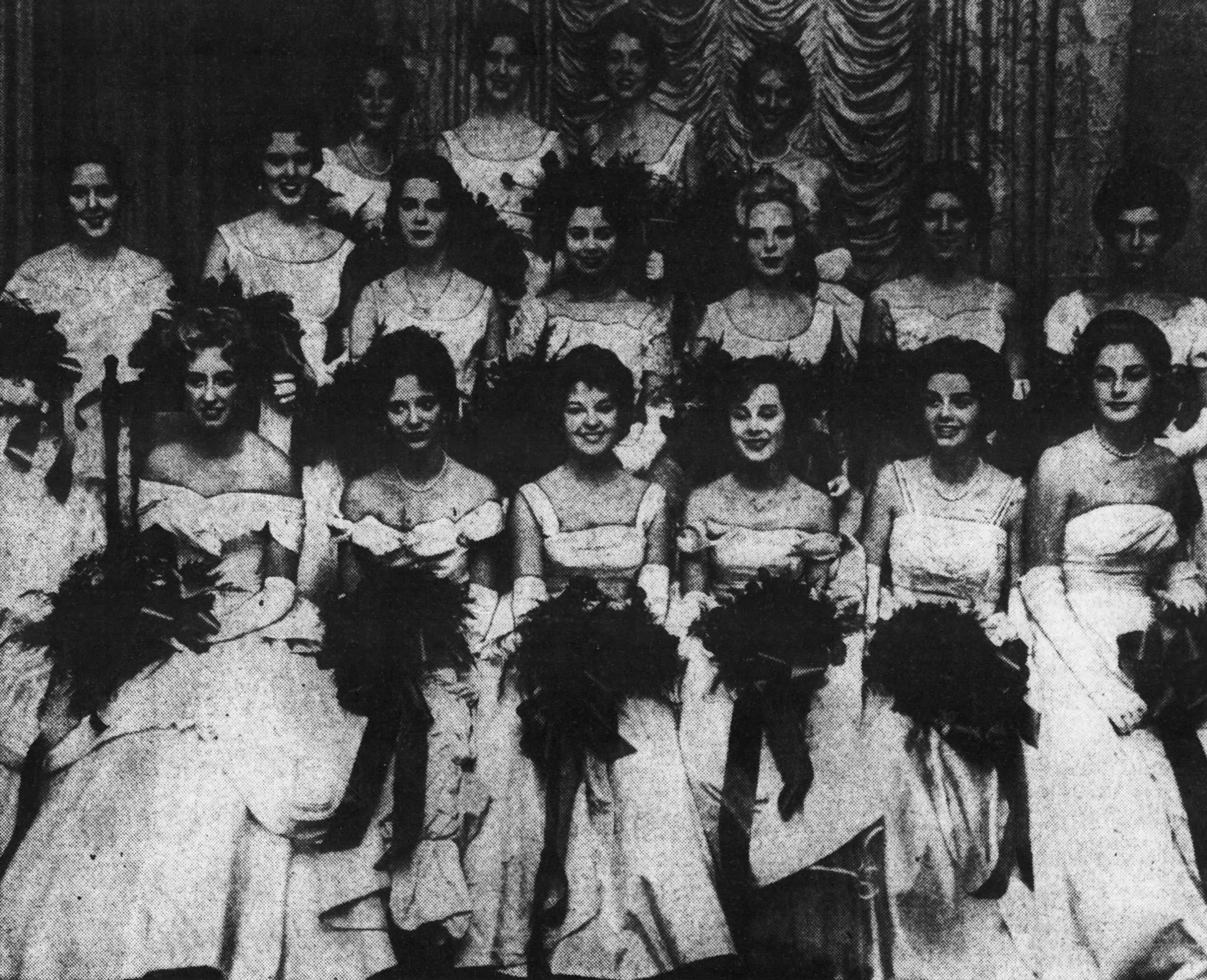
Seventeen debutantes are pictured at the 11th annual National Debutante Cotillion and Thanksgiving Ball, November 24, 1960, in Washington, D.C.

The National Debutante Cotillion and Thanksgiving Ball is an annual dance and formal debutante presentation of young women in Washington, D.C. Founded in 1949 by Miss Mary-Stuart Montague Price, one of the grande dames of Washington society. "Studie", as she was affectionately known, died in 2025. This event has become a 501(c)3 and is under new management. The primary fundraiser for the National Debutante Cotillion Foundation, it is held each year on the Friday after Thanksgiving.

== Format ==
=== Evolution ===
Hundreds of young ladies, their families, friends, and escorts have "had a ball" at Washington's oldest and most prestigious debutante presentation. Recently, changing customs and raised social consciousness have altered the debutante tradition. In the past, "coming out parties" were a rite of passage, where young woman were presented to polite society. Today's Debutante Cotillion is more often a recognition of an already accomplished and assured young woman. Organizers describe today's debutante as a mature, active and involved young woman, striving for success in college and a chosen career, and dedicated to supporting the charity work of the National Debutante Cotillion Foundation. The Washington Post described the Cotillion as "networking in a ball gown."

=== Invitation ===
Growing national prominence has broadened the Cotillion's geographic base. Originally, only area families participated. Today young women from many states travel to Washington to be presented. Regional Chairmen from many states including California, South Carolina, New York, North Carolina, Ohio, and Texas recommend young women and their families for participation. Inclusion is by invitation.

=== Post-debutantes ===
Guests call themselves members of the "Cotillion Family" and often come back for many years, befriending the debutantes and their families, and creating lasting relationships. Debutantes can formally participate in the ball for up to three years, with different colors representing their increasing confidence and sophistication: debutantes wear white, post-debutantes wear black and the post-post debutantes wear red.

== Charity work ==
The National Debutante Cotillion Foundation is a 501(c)(3) non-profit organization and all-volunteer public charity, which supports humanitarian works and organizations, including the Children's National Medical Center of Washington, DC. The primary fundraiser for the foundation is the National Debutante Cotillion and Thanksgiving Ball, presented each year on Friday, the day after Thanksgiving.

== See also ==
- Cotillion ball
- Debutante
- Social season
