= Savannah Cotillion Club =

Formal dance society

- Formation: 1817 (209 years ago)
- Location: Savannah, Georgia, United States

The Savannah Cotillion Club (also known as the Savannah Cotillion Society) is a formal dance society based in Savannah, Georgia. Its annual Christmas Cotillion, first held in 1817, it is the oldest debutante ball in the United States. It takes place a few days before Christmas.

Venues for the ball have included the Westin Savannah Harbor Hotel's grand ballroom. From around 2015, it has taken place at Savannah's Marriott Riverfront hotel at the eastern end of Bay Street. The build-up to the ball takes several months, including private parties, receptions, dress fittings, and photograph portraits.

The event is recreated in John Berendt's 1994 novel Midnight in the Garden of Good and Evil and 1997 movie adaptation, with The Lady Chablis gatecrashing the dance in June 1987.
