= Philippine debut =

Coming-of-age celebration for women

The debut (/dɛˈbuː/) is a Filipino celebration of a young woman's 18th birthday, traditionally, the age of maturity in the Philippines. The debutante customarily throws a large party complete with several traditions, similar to quinceañera or sweet sixteen. Although also reaching legal maturity at 18, debuts for a Filipino man customarily occur on his 21st birthday, albeit with less formal celebrations or none at all.

== Traditions ==
=== 18 Roses ===
18 or 9 male relatives or close friends chosen by the debutante to be a part of her court. This may include uncles, cousins, close friends, and her significant other. The 18 roses also participate in the "18 Roses Dance."

=== 18 Candles ===
18 or 9 female relatives or close friends chosen by the debutante to be a part of her court. The 18 candles typically give speeches about on the debutante and lights a candle that is either placed in her hand or a stand.

=== Dress ===
Along with the debutante, the celebrant's court usually wears formal dress, such as the barong tagalog or the western black tie.

=== Photoshoot ===
It is common practice to hold a photoshoot for the debutante prior to the debut. Oftentimes, this photoshoot will include other members of the debutante's party and features several outfit changes for the debutante.

=== Prayer ===
A typical ceremony begins with a short prayer invoking blessings upon the debutante.

=== Dances ===
A debutante then may engage in several traditional dances. Some debutantes take classes, practice, and rehearse beforehand to prepare for these dances.

==== 18 Roses Dance ====
Also known as the "9 Roses Dance", depending on how many members a debutante has in her party. The "18 Roses Dance" all of the debutante's roses (the chosen males in her court) presenting her with a red rose or her flower of choice. This dance is almost always begun with a "Father and Daughter Dance" and concluded with the significant other of the debutante. An older male relative, such as a grandfather, may also take the father's place if the latter is unavailable or deceased.

==== Grand Cotillion Dance ====
The most important dance a debutante performs is the "Grand Cotillion Dance", often a waltz, performed by the debutante and select members of her party.

=== 18 Treasures ===
Modern debuts typically also feature the "18 Treasures" where 18 individuals (male or female) each present the debutante with a gift. These usually also involve a speech from each individual, but unlike the Roses and Candles sets, these groups are of mixed gender.

=== Birthday Cake Ceremony ===
The event almost always has a ceremonial cutting of the birthday cake.

=== Debutante's Speech ===
The program usually concludes ends with a speech from a debutante, where she may share her thoughts on life and extend gratitude towards her guests.

Music and other performances are usually interspersed between these events.

=== Food ===
A meal is usually served during debuts and often features Filipino cuisine or favorite dishes of the debutante. Alcohol is also common.

== Recent Additions ==
=== 18 Shoes ===
Recent additions to debuts, also include the "18 shoes" in which 18 individuals each present the debutante with a pair of shoes.

=== 18 Bills ===
18 individuals each present the debutante with a "blue bill." A "blue bill" in the context of this ceremony refers to the Philippine one thousand peso note.

=== 18 White Roses ===
If the debutante is missing a figure in her life such as a father, she chooses her 18 white roses in place of that figure.

=== 18 Songs ===
18 songs performed by 18 individuals chosen by the debutante.

=== 18 Toasts ===
18 speeches delivered by 18 people of the debutante's choice.

A fireworks display may conclude more extravagant debuts.

== History ==
The debut has been said to be the product of Spanish colonization. While Latino quinceañeras celebrate a young woman's 15th birthday, Philippine debuts celebrate a women's 18th birthday, the age of maturity in the Philippines.

== Social aspects ==
Traditionally, a debut served as a means of presenting a woman to society and announcing her readiness for marriage and civic duties. Instead of just celebrating one individual, traditional debuts could feature up to 24 debutantes.

=== Modern debuts ===
The social implications of modern debuts have greatly evolved as a means of not only celebrating a young girl's transition into adulthood, but as a means of displaying social status. Some scholars, like Evelyn Ibatan Rodriguez have claimed that the modern-day debut can reinforce an antiquated ideal of femininity- one of purity, chastity, and virtuousness. This limiting ideal of femininity can be harmful when women do not fit into this one specific standard. Others have viewed the debut as a way of celebrating the debutante's achievements, aspirations, and transition into adulthood, but recognize how debuts can be limited to those in higher social classes given the financial means required of hosting a debut.

== In film ==
The custom was highlighted in the 2000 American small-budget film The Debut, starring Dante Basco.
