= Joy Bisco =

Filipino American actress

- Occupation: Actress
- Years active: 1995–present

Joy Bisco is an actress.

Her movie credits include The Debut and Not Another Teen Movie.

== Film credits ==
- Ghost World (2000) - Jade
- The Debut (2001) - Annabelle
- Not Another Teen Movie (2001) - Ashley
- Lumpia (2003) - Narrator

== TV ==
=== Starring ===
- Days of Our Lives - Gabby (2007)
- Port Charles - Casey Leong/Marissa Leong (2002–2003)
- One on One - Nurse Girl
- Blade Squad - Kimiko
- The Game - Corazon

=== Guest roles ===
- CSI: Crime Scene Investigation (Meet Market - Feb. 1, 2007) - Cotton Candy
- Desperate Housewives (2005, 2006) - Melanie Foster
- The Division (Ep. 4x01 - Jan. 11, 2004) - Marsha Hong
- The Bold and the Beautiful (Oct. 1, 2001) - Principal
- ER (18 November 1999) - Nurse (uncredited)
- Diagnosis: Murder (Ep. 4x11 - Nov. 21, 1996) - Student
- JAG (Ep.1x05 Oct. 21, 1995) - Gym
- Strange Luck (Ep. 1x06 - Oct 20, 1995) - Yolanda Morales
