= Ukrainian Engineers' Society of America =

The Ukrainian Engineers' Society of America is an organization of Ukrainian engineers and students based in New York City. The society was founded in New York City on September 18, 1948, by a group of Ukrainian immigrants of the engineering profession. Their first annual meeting was held on November 20, 1948. Their goal is to "...unite engineers and scientists for their mutual professional enrichment and exchange of knowledge; and also to study the current status of technology, industry and the economy in Ukraine; and for the development of a social/professional network". The society publishes the periodicals Ukrainian Engineering News and Bulletin TYIA. They also have published books.

According to their website, their functions include:

- Providing social opportunities to meet with other Ukrainian professionals.
- Providing a central location for current information about technical developments in Ukraine and by Ukrainians in both the United States and Ukraine.
- Providing unique professional networking opportunities
- Providing mentoring opportunities to assist students pursuing careers in the technical and economic fields.
- Honoring and publicizing the contributions of Ukrainian engineers, architects, economists, and other technical professionals.
- Aiding in projects intended to benefit the Ukrainian community in the United States
