= Sweet sixteen (birthday) =

Coming-of-age party

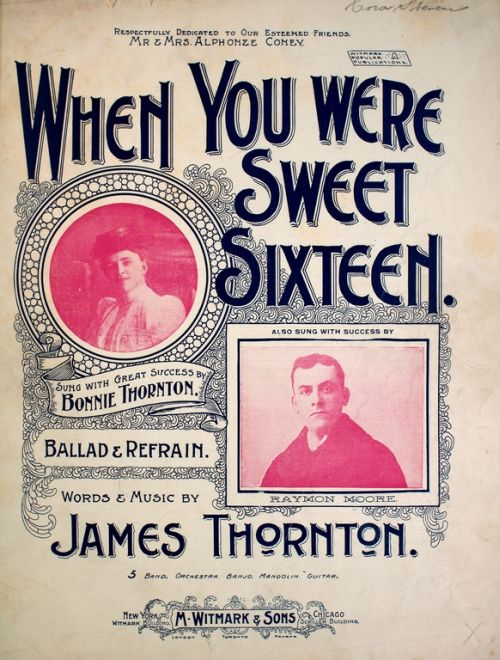
Sheet music cover for "When You Were Sweet Sixteen" (1898), a popular song romanticizing the age of 16

A sweet sixteen is a coming-of-age party celebrating one's 16th birthday, mainly celebrated in the United States and Canada. While they are not a legal adult, typically, when they turn 16 is when many people learn to drive, get jobs, and assume other adult responsibilities. For many, the 16th birthday celebrates adulthood and marks the end of a childhood. As the name suggests, the celebration takes place on a sixteenth birthday and is celebrated among girls and boys, though it is typically more common with girls. In the past, sweet sixteens tended to be formal, whereas they tend to be more informal today.

== Traditions ==
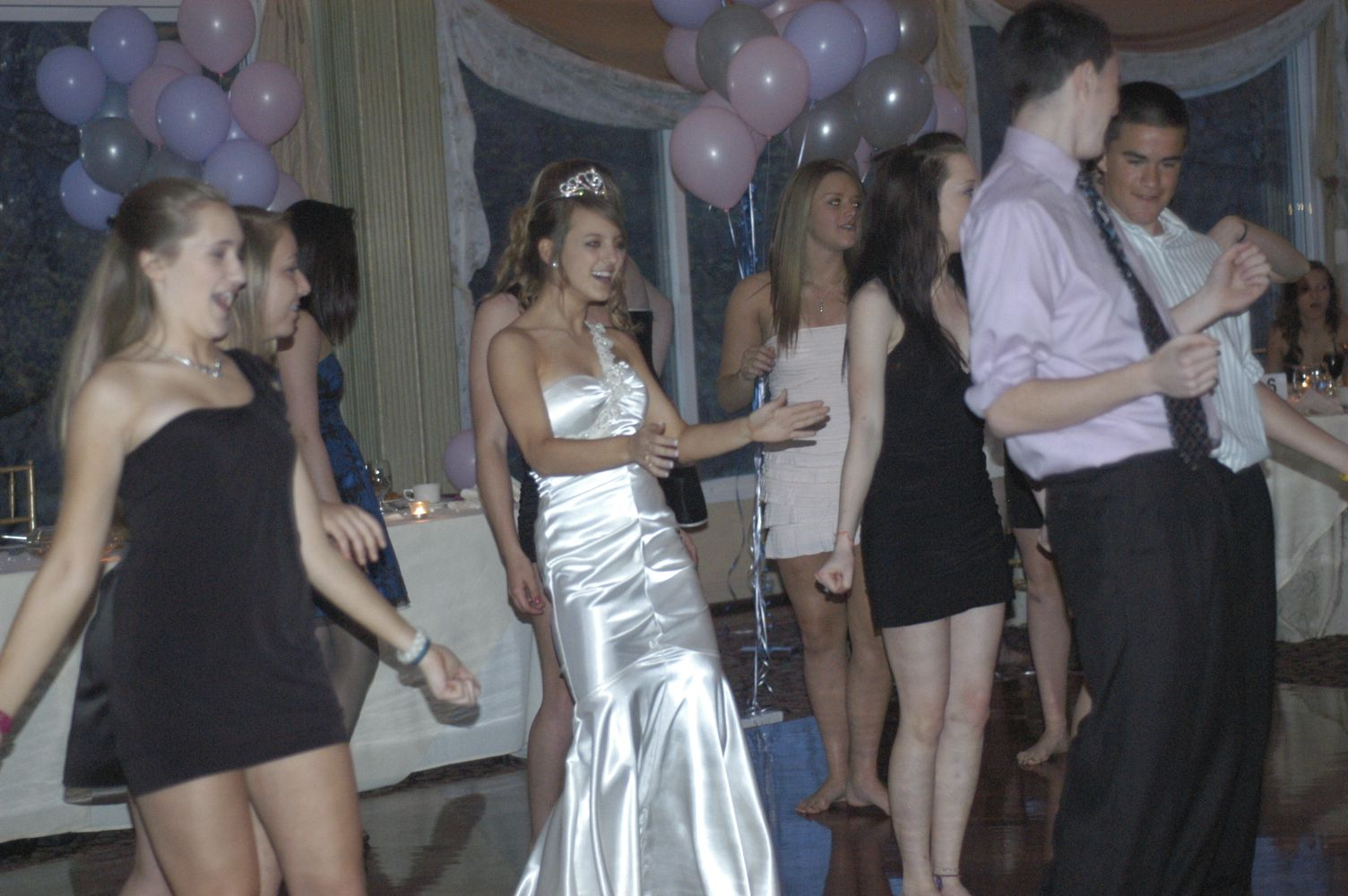
A sweet sixteen birthday party in the United States, 2010

=== Shoe ceremony ===
For girls, the shoe ceremony is common at sweet sixteen parties. In this ceremony, the birthday girl sits in a chair while her father, grandfather, godfather, uncle, or brother approaches her, carrying a decorative pillow with high heels. The girl traditionally wore flat shoes, such as slippers, and the male family member ceremoniously helped her into her new high heels. This is symbolic of the girl transitioning into a woman.

=== Tiara ceremony ===
The tiara ceremony is similar to the shoe ceremony, except the mother or a strong female figure approaches with a tiara instead of shoes and places it on her daughter's head to symbolize her becoming a woman. Sometimes, this is combined with the shoe ceremony so that two people approach the birthday girl, one with a pillow with high heels and the other with a pillow with a tiara.

=== Candle-lighting ceremony ===
While also performed at Bar and bat mitzvahs and Quinceañeras, this ceremony is common for Sweet Sixteen celebrations. There are typically 16 candles, each given to special family members and friends by the birthday girl. Usually, when the recipient of the candle is named, the birthday girl says a few words in regards to why this person (or people) is special to them, they may tell a short story or fun memory they have shared with that person. The birthday girl can decide to give her candles to whomever she chooses.

== Popular culture ==
Like most coming-of-age events, sweet 16s are common on TV, in movies (e.g. Sixteen Candles), music, books, and online.

=== Music ===
Songs that talk about or represent sweet 16s.

- "When You Were Sweet Sixteen" - Written by James Thornton, published 1898, #3 hit for Harry McDonough in 1901
- "16 Candles" - recorded by the Crests and several other artists, including Roy Orbison
- "Happy Birthday Sweet Sixteen" - Neil Sedaka
- "Sweet Little Sixteen" - Chuck Berry
- "Sweet Sixteen" - Iggy Pop
- "Sweet Sixteen" - Billy Idol
- "Sweet Sixteen" (no connection to the Billy Idol version) - Hilary Duff, it later became the theme song for MTV's reality show My Super Sweet 16.
- "You're Sixteen" - written by the Sherman Brothers, recorded by Johnny Burnette, Ringo Starr and others.
- "My Little Girl" - Tim McGraw
- "Butterfly Kisses" - Bob Carlisle
- "Only Sixteen" - Sam Cooke
- "Sweet 16" - Green Day

== See also ==
- Quinceañera
- Bar and bat mitzvah
- Age 16
- My Super Sweet 16
- Philippine debut
- Cug Huê Hng
- Coming of Age Day
- Coming of age
