= The Debut (2000 film) =

2000 independent film by Gene Cajayon

- Theatrical release poster
- Directed by: Gene Cajayon
- Written by: Gene Cajayon; John Manal Castro
- Produced by: Lisa Onodera
- Starring: Dante Basco; Tirso Cruz III; Eddie Garcia; Gina Alajar
- Cinematography: Hisham Abed
- Edited by: Kenn Kashima
- Music by: Wendell Yuponce
- Production companies: 5 Card Productions; Celestial Pictures; Center for Asian American Media; GMA Films; National Asian American Telecommunications Association; Visual Communications
- Distributed by: Destination Films (United States); Columbia TriStar Film Distributors International (Philippines) (Note: Under the Columbia Pictures banner.)
- Release dates: May 18, 2000 (Los Angeles Asian Pacific Film Festival); March 16, 2001 (United States)
- Running time: 88 minutes
- Countries: United States; Philippines
- Languages: English; Filipino
- Budget: $1 million
- Box office: $1,745,778

The Debut is a 2000 coming-of-age comedy-drama film directed and co-written by Gene Cajayon in his directorial debut. Incorporated themes of Philippine culture, struggling with heritage identity and racism, the title of the film refers to the traditional coming-of-age ceremony accompanying a young woman's 18th birthday.

A co-production of United States and Philippines, The Debut is the first film for an independent Hollywood film production (also known as Indiewood) to be written or directed by a Filipino-American and to take place or depicted within the Filipino-American community, and the first film to be produced with a Filipino film production GMA Films.

The film grossed $1.745 million in limited theatrical release in the United States.

== Synopsis ==
Ben Mercado is a talented high school senior who enrolls in a prestigious arts institute in order to realize his dreams of becoming an artist. However, his plans come into conflict with those of his strict immigrant father Roland, a postal worker intent on seeing Ben become a doctor. Their long-simmering feud—for Ben, a struggle to be accepted by America and therefore reject his Filipino heritage; and for Roland, a quest to give his children a better life than he had—threatens to boil over and ruin the elaborate eighteenth birthday party of Ben's sister Rose.

For Ben, Rose's celebration emerges as a cultural stew of old world traditions and contemporary urban lifestyles, challenging his sense of misplaced identity, his choice of friends, and even the way he regards his father. He also finds an unexpected confidante in Rose's best friend Annabelle. However, the evening's challenges to Ben are just beginning to surface. The arrival of Carlos, the Mercado family's overbearing patriarch, exacerbates tensions between father and son, while the temptation to ditch his relatives to be with his white friends at a kegger across town tugs at Ben throughout the evening. A possible budding romance with Annabelle is also complicated by the presence of hot-headed Augusto, a former childhood friend-turned gangsta wannabe and Annabelle's ex-boyfriend. In one night, Ben will face the true nature of his relationships with his family, his friends, and himself.

== Cast ==
- Dante Basco as Ben Mercado
- Tirso Cruz III as Roland Mercado
- Bernadette Balagtas as Rose Mercado
- Gina Alajar as Gina Mercado
- Eddie Garcia as Lolo Carlos
- Joy Bisco as Annabelle Manalo
- Darian Basco as Augusto
- Dion Basco as Rommel
- Derek Basco as Edwin Mercado
- Fe de los Reyes as Alice
- Abe Pagtama as Videographer

== Production ==
=== Development ===
The Debut is based on a ten-minute short film Cajayon had made as his thesis project at Loyola Marymount University in Los Angeles, California, United States. He incorporated themes from co-writer John Manal Castro's short film, Diary of a Gangsta Sucka.

After shooting the first ten minutes of his thesis project, Cajayon sent the movie script to potential private financial backers but was turned down. Cajayon and Castro shopped the film to major Hollywood studios, but were rebuffed.

At one point, producer Dean Devlin, who is half Filipino, became associated with the project, but the film was still unable to secure funding. Eventually the film was able to garner a grant from the NAATA (National Asian American Telecommunications Association). Cajayon tapped Picture Bride producer Lisa Onodera, Greg Spence, and Celestial Pictures to produce the film.

=== Casting ===
Adult roles in the movie were cast in the Philippines, where casting director Ernest Eschaler held casting sessions in Manila. The filmmakers were able to cast Tirso Cruz III, Gina Alajar, Eddie Garcia, and comedian Fe de los Reyes.

Back in the US, the filmmakers put out a casting call for the lead character, eventually selecting Dante Basco, who played Rufio in the 1991 Steven Spielberg film Hook. Actress Joy Bisco was cast as the female lead. In addition to Dante Basco in the lead role, the film also features other members of the Basco family (Derek, Darion, Dion, and Arianna).

=== Filming ===
Production started on October 21, 1997, at the Cantwell-Sacred Heart of Mary High School in Montebello, California. Reshoots were done a year after production finished. The musical score and licensing of songs for the soundtrack was done in 1999. The full-length film took eight years to produce and raise funding for (from 1992 to 2000), another year to be released in theaters, and two years to go on DVD in 2003 and television.

== Release ==
=== Film festivals ===
The film had its world premiere as the Opening Night Attraction of the 15th Annual Los Angeles Asian Pacific Film & Video Festival on May 18, 2000. It played the film festival circuit around the United States, including the Hawaii International Film Festival (HIFF) in November 2000. American film critic Roger Ebert, who was in attendance, was given a private screening of the film and gave the film a "thumbs up." The Debut won the 2000 HIFF Audience Award for Best Feature Film, beating out the heavily favored Crouching Tiger, Hidden Dragon.

The Debut’s success on the film festival circuit inspired the filmmakers to launch a theatrical self-distribution campaign. For two years, The Debut’s promotional team (consisting of Cajayon, co-writer John Castro, associate producer Patricio Ginelsa, and a full-time staff of five) traveled to fifteen major cities across the US and promoted the film directly to Asian Pacific American and mainstream communities. TV commercials were shown on local channels and on local cable systems.

=== Theatrical ===
The Debut was given a limited theatrical release on March 16, 2001 and eventually grossed $1.745 million at the box office. It was released in the Philippines by Columbia Pictures on August 13, 2003.

The film's success in theaters led to a domestic and international distribution deal with Sony Pictures. The film has been made available for home viewing on iTunes, Amazon Video, and VUDU.

== Reception ==
The film received positive reviews. On Rotten Tomatoes, the film has a 74% "fresh" rating based on 24 reviews. The site's consensus stated, “Although The Debut offers few surprises, it remains an engaging and well-acted look at the multi-generational immigrant experience.”

Film critics like Roger Ebert of the Chicago Sun Times and Kevin Thomas of the Los Angeles Times applauded the movie.

== Accolades ==
The Debut won a 2001 Ammy Award for Best Independent Feature Film. It also won the Best Narrative Feature award at the San Diego Asian Film Festival.
