= Quinceañera =

Celebration of a girl's 15th birthday

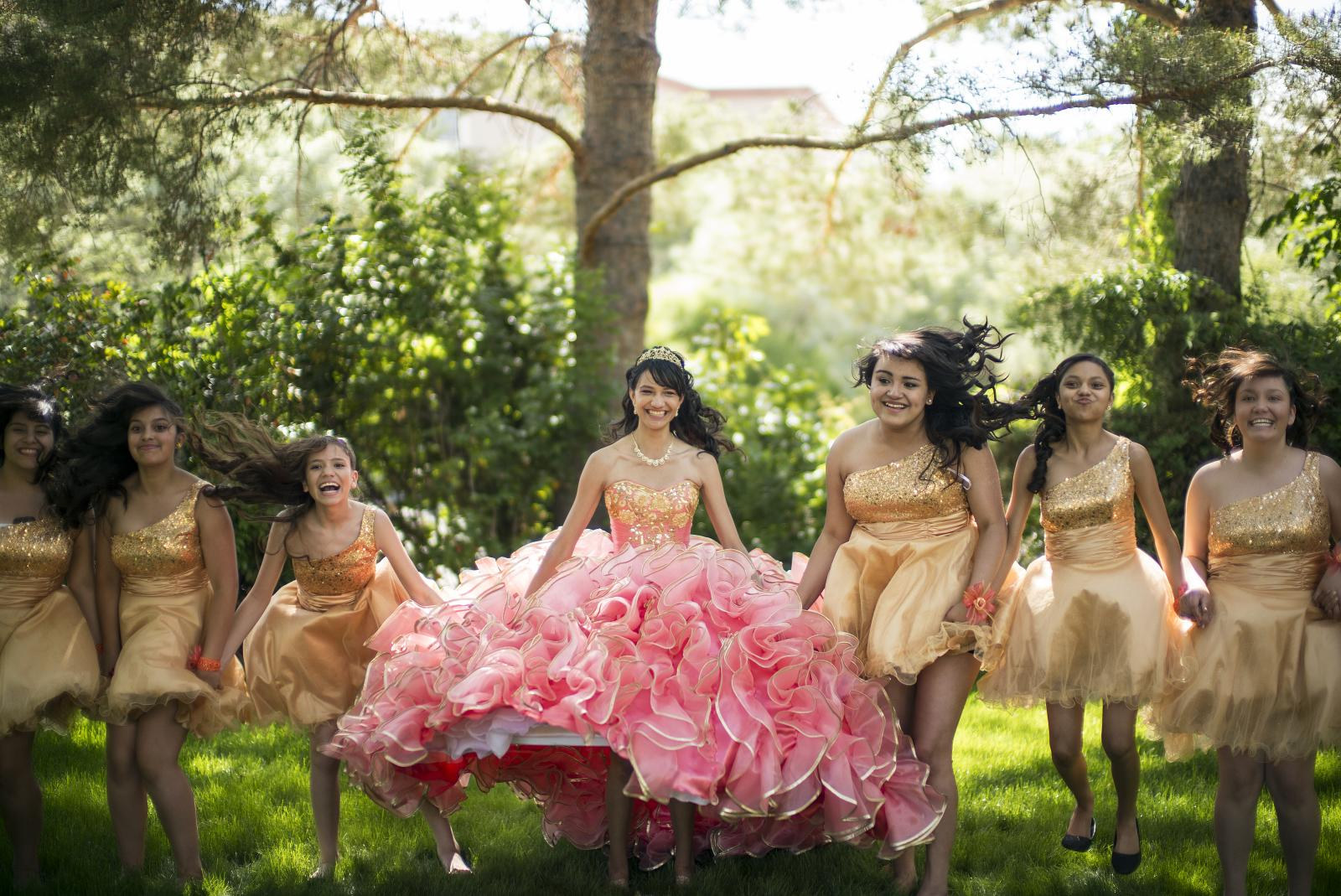
Mexican American girls at a quinceañera celebration in Santa Fe, New Mexico

A Quinceañera (Note: Latin American Spanish pronunciation: [kin.se.a.ˈɲe.ɾa].) in Spanish, or quinceañera (Note: American English: /ˌkiːn.sɪn.ˈjɛər.ə, -.seɪ.ən.ˈ-/.) in the United States, is a coming of age celebration in Latin American cultures for a girl's 15th birthday. The Spanish names for the celebration can be literally translated to English as the "celebration of the 15-year-old" (fiesta de quinceañera, fiesta de quince años), "15 years" (quince años, quinceañero) or just "15" (quince).

Practices or traditions for the event can vary across different cultures and can take on religious overtones, but typically involve food, dancing, music, and the girl of honor wearing a tiara.

== History ==
Contemporary festivities combine Catholic traditions from old Spain with the traditions of indigenous heritages of pre-Columbian Mexico, along with a few modern twists, and rely heavily on European influence from the period of the Second Mexican Empire. For example, in ancient Mexico, the Aztecs and other indigenous peoples had many different ceremonies to mark the passage through the various stages of life. The quinceañera marked a young woman's transition to adulthood, as she was presented, as a virgin, to the community for probable suitors.

Other origin stories attribute quinceañera history to the Duchess of Alba in Spain, who hosted a ball at her palace and invited adolescent girls to attend in formal clothes.This tradition continued and was reinforced when Empress Carlota of Mexico, granddaughter of the Louis Philippe I of France, threw a similar reception for her court in Mexico City—presenting young women as eligible for marriage. The traditions of the quinceañera wearing elaborate ball gowns, utilizing courtly European social customs, and ballroom dancing coincides with the styles and customs of the period of the Second Mexican Empire, which was an extension of the European royal courts of the time.

In a traditional Mexican quinceañera, young women and men have roles as formal damas and chambelanes, who perform special bends at the celebration, along with the quinceañera herself. There is also a "man of honor" who accompanies the young woman. Potential suitors present gifts to her family to make up a dowry or bridal wealth. Prior to her being given away, the women of the community participate by instructing the quinceañera in her duties and responsibilities, urging her to follow the correct path, by remaining true to her people and their traditions throughout her life.

The meaning behind the quinceañera has become more refined over time and varies between different regions.

In rural societies, girls were considered ready for marriage once they turned 15. In the 20th century, the quinceañera received certain privileges associated with womanhood: permission to attend adult parties, pluck her eyebrows and shave her legs, wear makeup, jewelry and high heels. When this tradition originated, the quinceañera was a small party to celebrate the transition. Friends and family gathered in order to give the girl a chance to mingle with young men. Rich families celebrated quinceañeras with big parties and elaborate dresses, and sent announcements to newspapers to publicize the event.

In the 1960s, immigrants to the United States brought the quinceañera with them. Affluent immigrants who had formerly been poor were able to have big parties like those in their home country. Family and friends often help put on the event, for example, by making food.

From a simple food and cake celebration, it has developed among wealthier families to become an occasion for a big party. Families may use event planners, and develop a celebration with a theme, to be staged with a special entrance and dances, and captured by professional photoshoots and video. Modern quinceañera celebrations also incorporate traditions from other cultures. Markets for event planners and quinceañera-related products have developed.

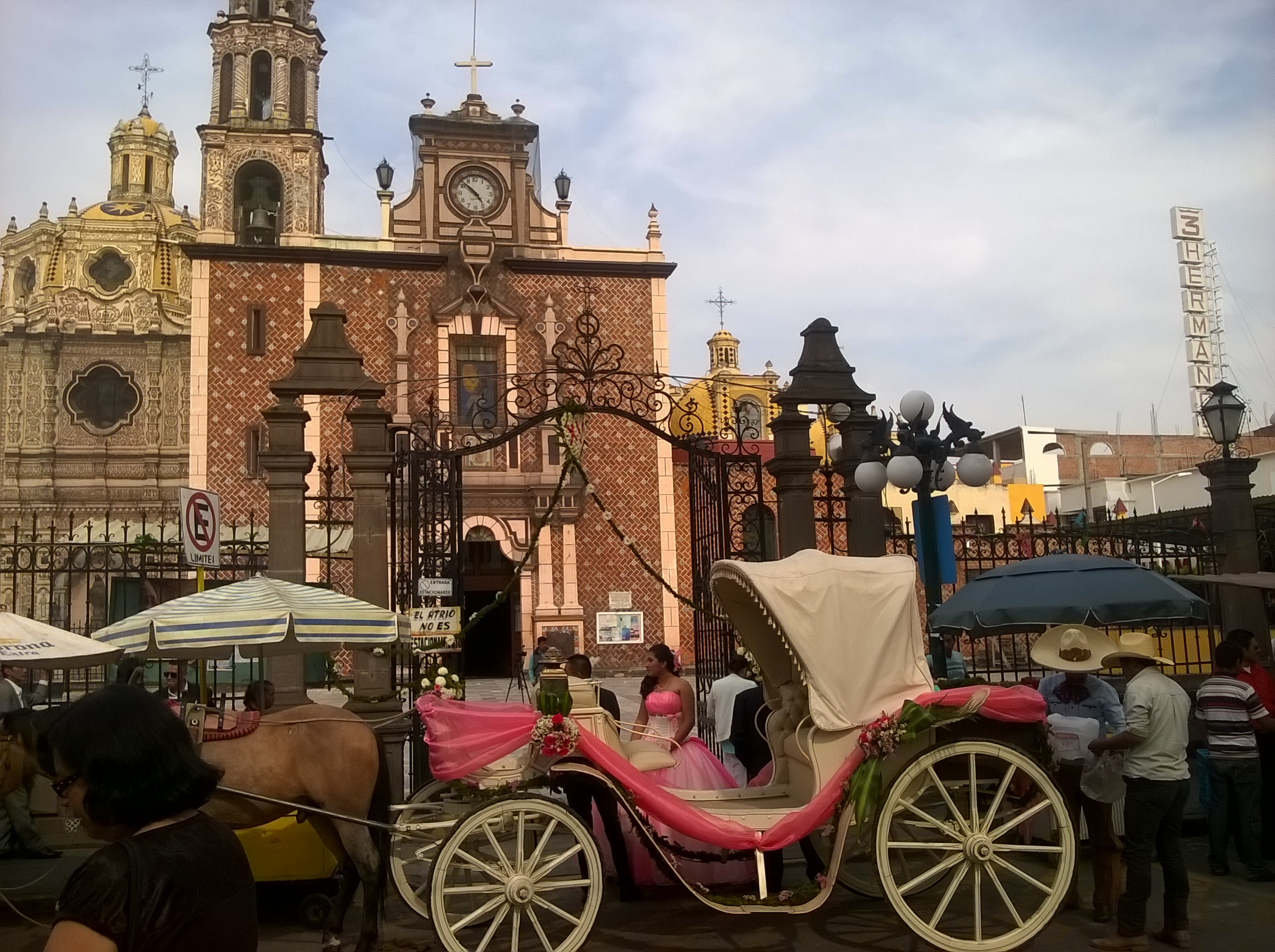
A fiesta de quince años at the Church of San Martin in San Martín Texmelucan, Puebla, Mexico

== Methods of celebration ==
This celebration is different from any other event marking a person's birthday, since it marks the transition from childhood to young womanhood. Scholar Yyonne Vissing said that this celebration may begin "with a religious ceremony," is followed by a party featuring food, music, dancing, and fancy dressing, and called it a tradition which "celebrates a young girl’s journey from childhood to maturity." Historically, in the years prior to their 15th birthdays, girls learned about cooking, weaving, and childbearing from the elder women in their communities in preparation for their future roles as wives. During the celebration the girl's father would present her to potential suitors.

In the past, parallel customs could be found in Southern Europe, mainly Spain and France. Today, the custom remains strongest in Mexico, its likely country of introduction during the viceregal or Mexican imperial periods. However, it is widely celebrated in Spanish-speaking countries in the Americas. The grandest parties are comparable to British and American debutante balls. The celebrations themselves vary significantly in different countries; for example, the festivities in some have taken on more religious overtones than in others. Nowadays, the quinceañera is also celebrated by many Latino Americans in the United States, each according to their traditions.

In Brazil, a Portuguese-speaking country, a similar celebration is called festa de debutantes, baile de debutantes, or festa de quinze anos. In the French Caribbean and French Guiana, it is called fête des quinze ans, a term which is also used to refer to similar ceremonies in Mexico City's historic center.

== In specific countries ==
=== Cuba ===
In Cuba, the party may include a choreographed group dance, in which 14 couples waltz around the quinceañera, who is accompanied by one of the main dancers, a boy of her choice, or her boyfriend. The choreography often includes four or six dancers or escorts called experts, who are allowed to dance around the quinceañera. They are usually inexperienced dancers whose function is to highlight the central couple. The male dancers are also allowed to wear tuxedos in different colors.

Fifteenth-birthday celebrations were very popular in Cuba until the late 1970s. This practice partly entered Cuba via Spain, but the greatest influence was the French. The wealthy families who could afford to rent expensive dining rooms in private clubs or hotels of four and five stars held celebrations that were the precursors of quinceañeras, which they called quinces. These celebrations usually took place in the house of the girl or the more spacious house of a relative.

Another tradition, commonly found in Cuba, is to have 14 ladies and 14 escorts (sometimes 7 each) as a court. The escorts hold flowers (usually roses) and the ladies carry candles. As the quinceañera dances the waltz with her father, she blows out one candle, then picks up one rose. This continues until she has blown out all the candles and picked up all the roses. The 14 candles blown out represent her 14 previous years, and with each she makes a wish. When the time comes to cut the cake, the quinceañera will blow out her last candle, thus completing her 15 wishes. The flowers are given to her mother.

=== Colombia ===
In Colombia, the quince starts with the arrival of the birthday girl, accompanied by her father. She is then received by her mother and other relatives and friends; the father and daughter dance a waltz and other tunes. The quinceañera birthday girl next dances with her brothers (if any) and their uncles and godparents. Then she performs the pasodoble and the waltz with all members of the procession (then optional dances to other music, such as merengue or pop).

For this occasion the teenager wears an evening dress in light colors or pastels, is dressed and made up slightly, and usually places a tiara in her hair and jewels on her neck and hands. All the guests dress in formal attire, including the teenager's peers.

After the first dance, the teenager and her friends have a dance. Then the festival begins with music from live bands, some famous artists, DJs, food, drink, and at one late point of the night a la hora loca is carried out, in which the attendants wear masks or funny wigs and make noise with whistles and rattles while fast-tempo music is played. It is optional to make some surprise dance performed by the quinceañera birthday girl (alone or accompanied), and a dance that will give away her friends, cousins, and others.

The custom's social significance is such that even poor families tend to spend lavishly on a daughter's quinceañera. The event can cost as much as a year's wages, and many take up debt to be able to pay for it.

=== French Guiana and French Caribbean ===
In French Guiana and the French Caribbean, the celebration is known as fête des quinze ans. It follows a similar structure.

=== Mexico ===
In Mexico, the quinceañera is adorned with elegant jewelry and makeup. By tradition, this was to be the first time she would wear makeup in public, but in the 21st century, girls start using makeup at an earlier age. The quinceañera is also expected to wear a formal evening dress, traditionally a long, elegant ball gown chosen by the girl and most often, her mother, according to her favorite color and style.

A Mexican quinceañera celebration

In the Mexican Catholic tradition, the quinceañera celebration begins with a thanksgiving Mass. She arrives at church accompanied by her parents, godparents, and court of honor. The court of honor is a group of her chosen peers consisting of paired-off girls and boys, respectively known as damas (dames) and chambelanes (chamberlains). Typically, the court consists of pairs ranging from 7 to 15 damas and chambelanes. It is also okay for the quinceañera to choose to have only damas or only chambelanes in her court.

At this religious mass, a Rosary, or sometimes a necklace with a locket or pendant depicting Mexico's patron saint, the Virgin of Guadalupe, is presented to the teenager by her godparents, the necklace or rosary having been previously blessed by the priest. She is also awarded a tiara, which serves as a reminder that to her loved ones, especially her immediate family, the quinceañera will always be a princess. Some also see it as denoting that she is a "princess" before God and the world. After this, the girl may leave her bouquet of flowers on the altar for the Virgin Mary.

After the thanksgiving mass, guests gather for a celebratory reception where the events to honor the quinceañera will take place, including giving gifts. This reception may be held at the quinceañera's home, at venues (such as dining halls, banquet halls, or casinos), or in some cases, in more public places, similar to a block party. During the reception, the birthday girl usually dances a traditional waltz with her father to a song chosen by both that speaks about the occasion and their relationship.

A popular waltz song traditionally played during the dance is Tiempo de Vals by Chayanne. Then her father passes her to the chambelán de honor, her chosen escort, and afterward they continue the dance with the rest of her court of honor. Often this section of the celebration is previously practiced and/or choreographed, often weeks in advance, sometimes even with months of anticipation.

The basic reception has six major parts with dances taking place while a traditional Mexican meal is served:

1. The formal entry (La Entrada) – A grand entrance made by the quinceañera once most guests have been seated.
2. The formal toast (El Brindis)– An optional but usually featured part of the reception, generally initiated by the parents or godparents of the birthday girl.
3. The first dance – Usually a waltz where the girl dances, starting with her father.
4. The family dance – Usually a waltz involving just the immediate relatives, the chambelanes, godparents, and the closest friends of the girl.
5. The preferred song (Baile Sorpresa) – Any modern song particularly enjoyed by the quinceañera is played and danced.
6. The general dance – Also usually a traditional waltz.

Traditionally, Mexican girls could not dance in public until they turned 15, except at school dances or at family events. So the waltz with her chambelanes is choreographed and elaborate to celebrate what was meant to be the quinceañera's first public dance.

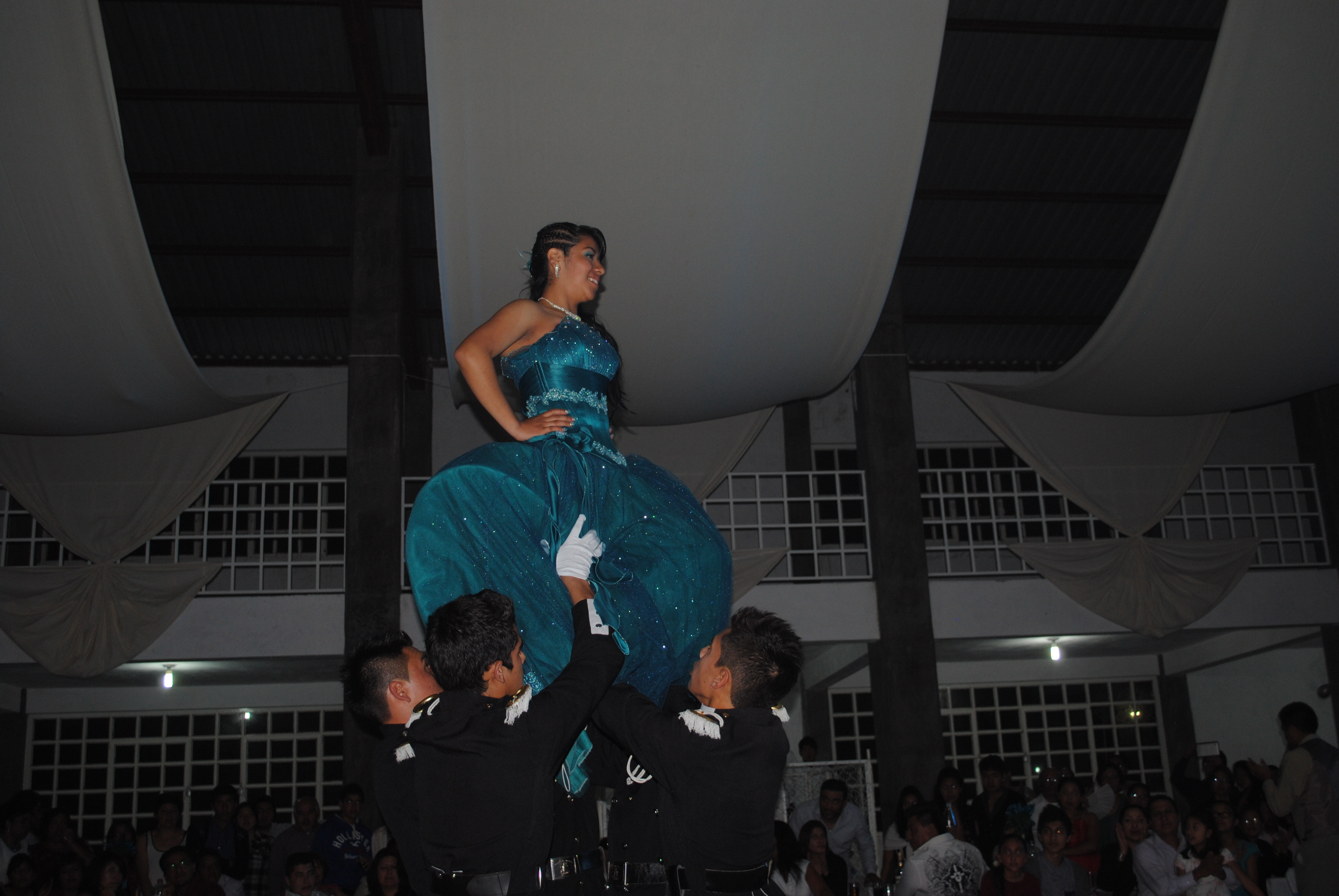
A Quinceañera with chambelanes

Some families may choose to add a ceremonial components to the celebration, depending on local customs. Among them are the ceremony of the Change of Shoes, in which a family member presents the quinceañera with her first pair of high heel shoes; the Crowning ceremony, in which a close relative places a crown on her head; and ceremonia de la última muñeca (literally "ceremony of the last doll"), during which her father presents her with a doll usually wearing a dress similar to the quinceañera. The ceremony of the last doll is based on a Maya tradition; it is related to the birthday girl's later giving up of the doll as she grows into womanhood.

Once all symbolic gestures have taken place, the dinner is begun. At this point, the celebration reaches its peak; live musical groups begin playing music, keeping the guests entertained. The music is played while the guests dine, chat, mingle, and dance. The next morning the family and closest friends may also attend a special breakfast, especially if they are staying with the family. Sometimes what is known as a recalentado (re-warming) takes place in which any food not consumed during the event of the night before is warmed again for a brunch type event.

=== Spain ===
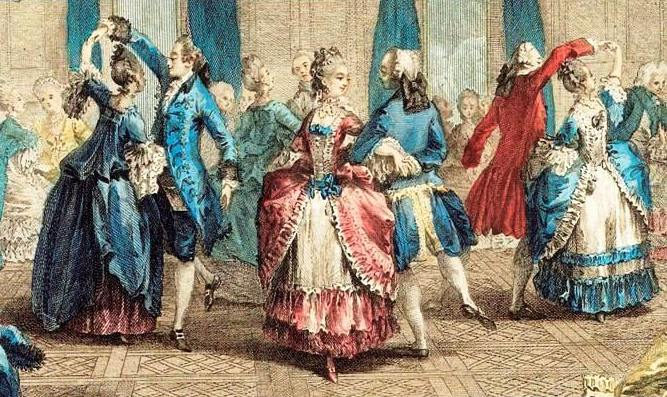
A European ball, c. 1774

Although the origin of the festival seems to have its cause in the ancient European aristocratic festival of the "puesta de largo", or "Debutante ball" according to the nomenclature of foreign influence, in which young women of marriageable age were presented before society, this festival was always restricted to the upper classes in the peninsular kingdoms. In the 20th century its celebration age was delayed to coincide with the civil age of majority.

Although it was exported to America, where it also took root among the popular classes, in Spain it gradually disappeared throughout the 20th century. The custom has been reintroduced again, although in a less formal version, as a result of Latin American immigration, whose members have applied it to their second generation. This version of the festival is not generally considered a custom typical of Spain, but rather exclusive to immigrants.

=== United States ===
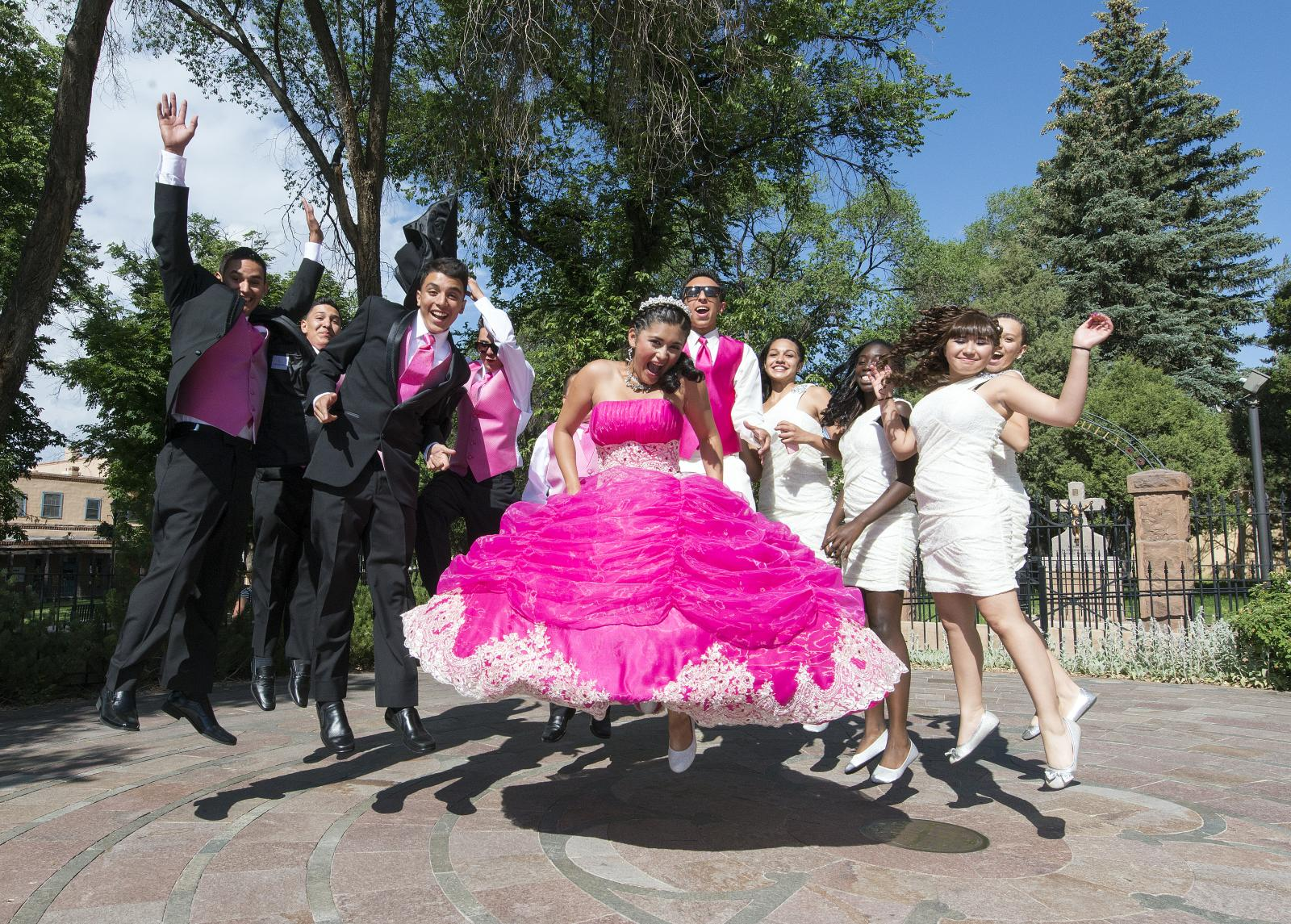
A Quinceañera. Santa Fe.

While in most of the United States it is customary to celebrate a sweet sixteen, a quinceañera is common among the large Latino population throughout the country and Puerto Rico. Quinceañeras were noted to be celebrated in the mid- to late 1970s in Los Angeles and San Diego and in the early 1980s in different parts of Texas. Though they may not have been widespread, many working-class families could afford quinceañeras because the padrinos and padrones pitch in for the costs.

In recent years, quinceañeras have gained popularity in the United States. Books and other publications about quinceañeras distributed in the United States increasingly include English versions to the original works in Spanish. This shows the increasing influence of Latin American culture within the broader American culture. The increasing popularity of the celebration has begun to lead to an uptick in retailers and businesses catering directly to young women.

=== Argentina ===
In Argentina, the "fiesta de 15" follows a similar structure but without the Mexican chambelanes or dances. There is also an "after twelve list" where people who aren't that close with the quinceañera can come into the party and enjoy it but without being part of the symbolical experience of the fiesta de 15.

== New traditions ==
In the 21st century, many girls create their own quinceañera celebrations. Whereas traditional dresses were formal and usually white dresses only and are now more varied. Also, instead of having the traditional seven damas and seven chambelanes, the quinceañera may pick all damas or all chambelanes. Traditionally, girls were not allowed to dance in public until turning 15, but this taboo has also receded significantly. The ceremony of the Changing of the Shoes has also been modified. Instead of wearing slippers before ceremonially exchanging them for high heels, a girl may decide to wear shoes compatible with the color and style of her dress instead of donning the traditional slippers.

== Celebrities who had quinceañeras ==
Several celebrities had quinceañeras growing up.

- Eva Longoria started working at a fast food restaurant to pay for hers (1990)
- Francia Raisa (2003)
- Bella Thorne had her quinceañera to honor her Cuban heritage through her father (2011)
- Aimee Garcia (1993)
- Justina Machado described her quinceañera as "low-budget" and "lame" (1987)
- Chiquis Rivera, daughter of Jenni Rivera (2000)
- America Ferrera had a double quinceañera, one of which was thrown by Lilly Singh.
- Gia Lopez, daughter of Mario Lopez and Courtney Mazza Lopez (2025)

== In popular culture ==
Quinceañeras have been portrayed in many books, movies, television shows, documentaries, plays, and online series, like the 2006 film Quinceañera, 2012 film Beverly Hills Chihuahua 3: Viva la Fiesta!, the 2012 film McFarland, USA, 1990 film Sweet 15, the 1987 Mexican telenovela entitled Quinceañera (which later inspired Miss XV), the 2006 program Quiero Mis Quinces, and the reality television series My Super Sweet 16. One masters thesis stated that there is "no shortage" of visual media focusing on quinceañeras and asserted that the latter is "traditionally something of a spectacle...[and] makes for good entertainment" while it is also a "unique and...meaningful expression of ethnic heritage and maturation."

Other series have stand-alone episodes centered on quinceañeras, including live-action TV series centered on food, such as Top Chef, Cake Boss, Dinner: Impossible, had episodes centering on quinceañeras. Series with similar episodes include Austin & Ally, The Fosters, George Lopez, Jack Ryan Sesame Street, and Superman & Lois. Additionally, animated series such as Elena of Avalor, Hailey's On It!, The Owl House, The Proud Family: Louder and Prouder, The Casagrandes, and Dora the Explorer have included episodes centering on quinceañeras.

== See also ==
- Rite of passage
- Confirmation
- Cotillion ball
- Debutante
- Sweet sixteen (birthday)
- Las Mañanitas
- Bar and bat mitzvah
- Cug Huê Hng
- Philippine debut
