= 510 East St. Julian Street =

Historic house in Savannah, Georgia

- Interactive map of the 510 East St. Julian Street area
- Alternative names: Odingsells House

General information
- Location: Savannah, Georgia, U.S., 510 East St. Julian Street
- Coordinates: 32.078645°N 81.085987°W
- Completed: 1797 (229 years ago)

510 East St. Julian Street, also known as the Odingsells House, is a building in Savannah, Georgia, United States. It is located in the northwestern civic block of Washington Square and was built in 1797. Built as a home for Major Charles Odingsells, a native of South Carolina, it is now part of the Savannah Historic District and is the oldest building in Washington Square.

In a survey for Historic Savannah Foundation, Mary Lane Morrison found the building to be of significant status.

It is a one-storey gable-ended building finished in clapboard. It has a Federal-style center hall, which is flanked by a duo of sash windows. The house's stoop and steps lead up beyond a low basement. A porch was added in the 20th century.

This home, and the nearby Hampton Lillibridge House, were restored by Jim Williams.

== See also ==
- Buildings in Savannah Historic District
