= The Brice =

Historic building in Georgia, U.S.

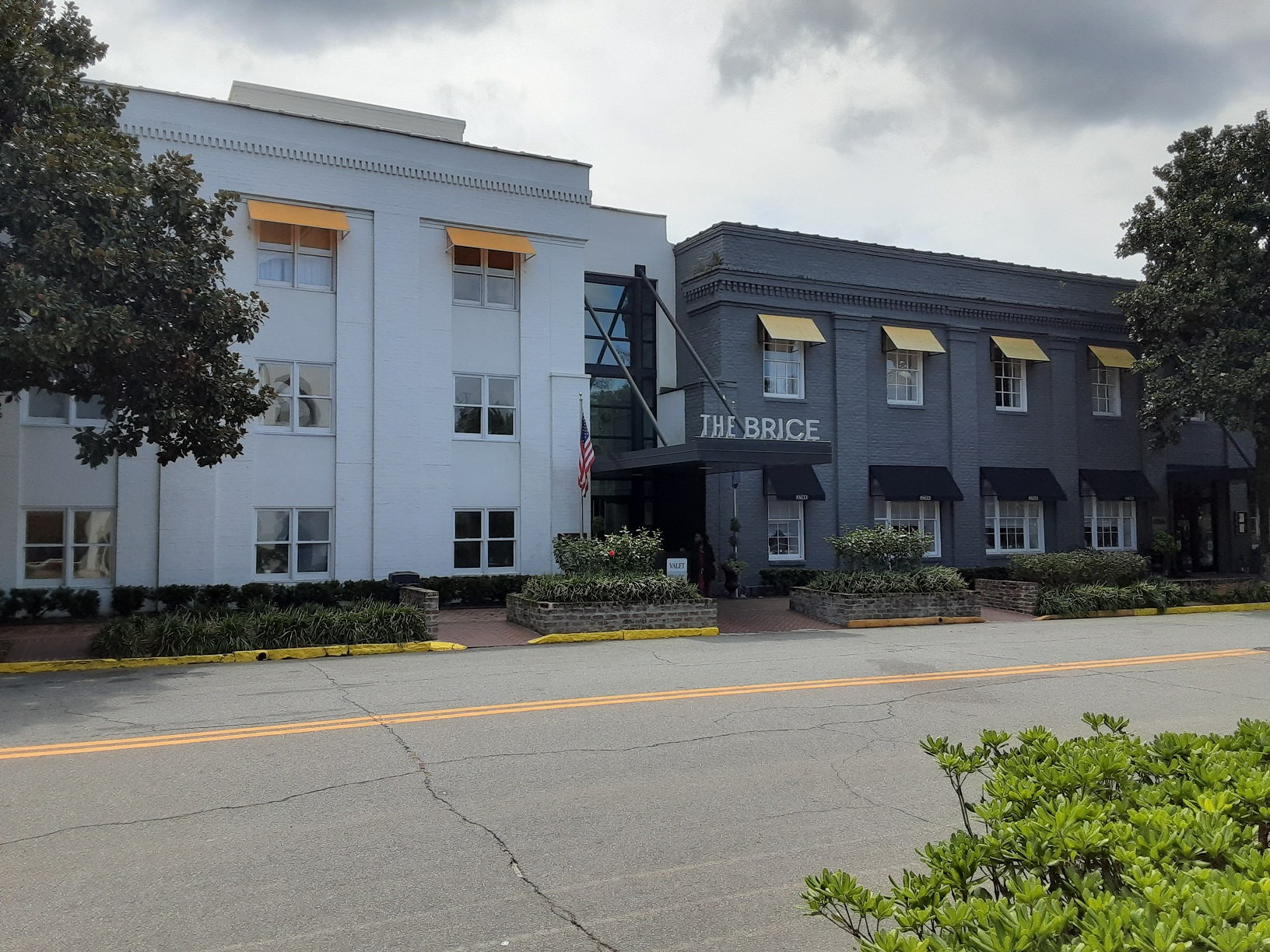
- The building's Houston Street façade in 2021

General information
- Architectural style: Greek revival
- Location: 601 East Bay Street, Savannah, Georgia, US
- Coordinates: 32.0789°N 81.0846°W
- Completed: 1860 (166 years ago)
- Client: The Kimpton Brice Hotel
- Owner: Kimpton Hotels & Restaurants (since 2013, 13 years ago)

Technical details
- Floor count: 3
- Floor area: 91,000 sq ft (8,500 m^{2})

The Brice is a historic building at 601 East Bay Street in Savannah, Georgia, United States. The building, which is in the Savannah Historic District (itself on the National Register of Historic Places), dates to 1860. At 91,000 sq ft (8,500 m^{2}), it takes up an entire city block (the northeastern residential tything block) of Washington Square, in what was Savannah's Old Fort neighborhood.

A former livery stable, cotton warehouse and (from the early 1900s) Savannah's first Coca-Cola bottling plant, it was converted into a series of hotels, the previous one being the Mulberry Inn, a Holiday Inn franchise, in 1982. It has been occupied since 2014 by the 145-room Kimpton Brice Hotel. (Brice is Gaelic for brick.)

== See also ==
- Buildings in Savannah Historic District
