= Washington Square (Savannah, Georgia) =

Public square in Savannah, Georgia

- Interactive map of Washington Square
- Namesake: George Washington
- Maintained by: City of Savannah
- Location: Savannah, Georgia, U.S.
- Coordinates: 32.0783°N 81.0853°W
- North: Houston Street
- East: East St. Julian Street
- South: Houston Street
- West: East St. Julian Street

Construction
- Completed: 1790 (236 years ago)

Washington Square is one of the 22 squares of Savannah, Georgia, United States. It is located in the northernmost row of the city's five rows of squares, on Houston Street and East St. Julian Street. It is east of Warren Square and north of Greene Square in the northeastern corner of the city's grid of squares, in Savannah's Old Fort neighborhood. The oldest building original to the square is 510 East St. Julian Street, which dates to 1797.

Built in 1790, Washington Square was named in 1791 for George Washington, the first president of the United States, who visited Savannah that year. It was one of only two squares named to honor a then-living person, Troup Square being the other.

Washington Square had been the site of the Trustees' Garden. Named for the trustees of General James Oglethorpe's colony, the garden was the testing ground for a variety of experimental crops – including mulberry (for silkworms), hemp, and indigo – viewed as potential cash crops. Most of these experiments proved unsuccessful.

The square was once the site of massive New Year's Eve bonfires; these were discontinued in the 1950s.

In 1964 Savannah landscape architect Clermont Huger Lee and Mills B. Lane planned and initiated a project to close the fire lane, add North Carolina bluestone pavers, initiate the use of different paving materials, install water cisterns, and lastly install new walks, benches, lighting, and plantings.

At 541–545 East Congress Street are three Joseph Burke Properties, built in 1860. They were restored in 1955 by preservationist Jim Williams (later the central character in John Berendt's 1994 book Midnight in the Garden of Good and Evil), his first project of over fifty he undertook before his death in 1990

== Dedication ==
Namesake	Image	Note
George Washington		The square is named for George Washington (1732–1799), the first president of the United States.

== Constituent buildings ==
Each building below is in one of the eight blocks around the square composed of four residential "tything" blocks and four civic ("trust") blocks, now known as the Oglethorpe Plan. They are listed with construction years where known.

Northwestern tything/residential block

- Mary Horrigan Property, 520–522 East Bryan Street (1899)
- Joseph Wilkinson House, 11 Houston Street (1807)
- Mary Gildea House, 514 East Bryan Street (1899)
- Margaret Prindible Property, 508–512 East Bryan Street (1899)
- William Williams House, 16 Price Street (1809)
- D.D. Williams House, 12 Price Street (1816)
- 14 Price Street (1816)

Northwestern civic/trust block

- Simon Mirault House, 21 Houston Street (1852) – moved from Troup Ward
- Joachim Hartstene House, 23 Houston Street (c. 1803) – rebuilt with original members in 1964
- 516 East St. Julian Street (1849)
- Daniel Philbrick House, 512–514 East St. Julian Street (1849)
- 510 East St. Julian Street (1797) – oldest building original to the square
- Anne Pitman House, 504 East St. Julian Street (1842)

Southwestern civic/trust block

- International Seaman's House, 25 Houston Street (1965)
- Hampton Lillibridge House, 507 East St. Julian Street (1796–1799) – moved from 310 East Bryan Street
- 503 East St. Julian Street
- William Flood House, 501 East St. Julian Street (1901)

Southwestern tything/residential block

- Isabella Brower House, 519 East Congress Street (1837–1839)
- Laurence Dunn Property (I), 31–33 Houston Street (1875)
- Laurence Dunn Property (II), 35–37 Houston Street (1872)
- William Gaston House, 511 East Congress Street (1839) – remodeled in 1869
- Isabella Mallery House, 513 East Congress Street (1841)
- William Wescott House, 36 Price Street (1875)
- 38 Price Street (c. 1840)

Northeastern tything/residential block

- 601 East Bay Street (1860) – now The Brice hotel

Northeastern civic/trust block

- Morty Dorgan Property (I), 20 Houston Street (1852–1853)
- Morty Dorgan Property (II), 542 East St. Julian Street (1853) – remodeled in 1888–1898

Southeastern civic/trust block

- Catherine McCarthy Property, 26–30 Houston Street (1887)
- 545–547 East St. Julian Street (1887)
- Mary Ferguson House, 549 East St. Julian Street (1905)
- 31 East Broad Street (1860)
- 33–35 East Broad Street (1860)

Southeastern tything/residential block

- 537–539 East Congress Street (1915)
- Joseph Burke Properties, 541–545 East Congress Street (1860)
- Ann Pinder House, 547 East Congress Street (1831–1835)
- James McMahon House, 37–39 East Broad Street (1874)
- Charles Wood Row House, 41–47 East Broad Street (1899)

The "sister house" of the Hampton Lillibridge House, which was original the square, was built around the same time. It was demolished in 1962.

== Gallery ==
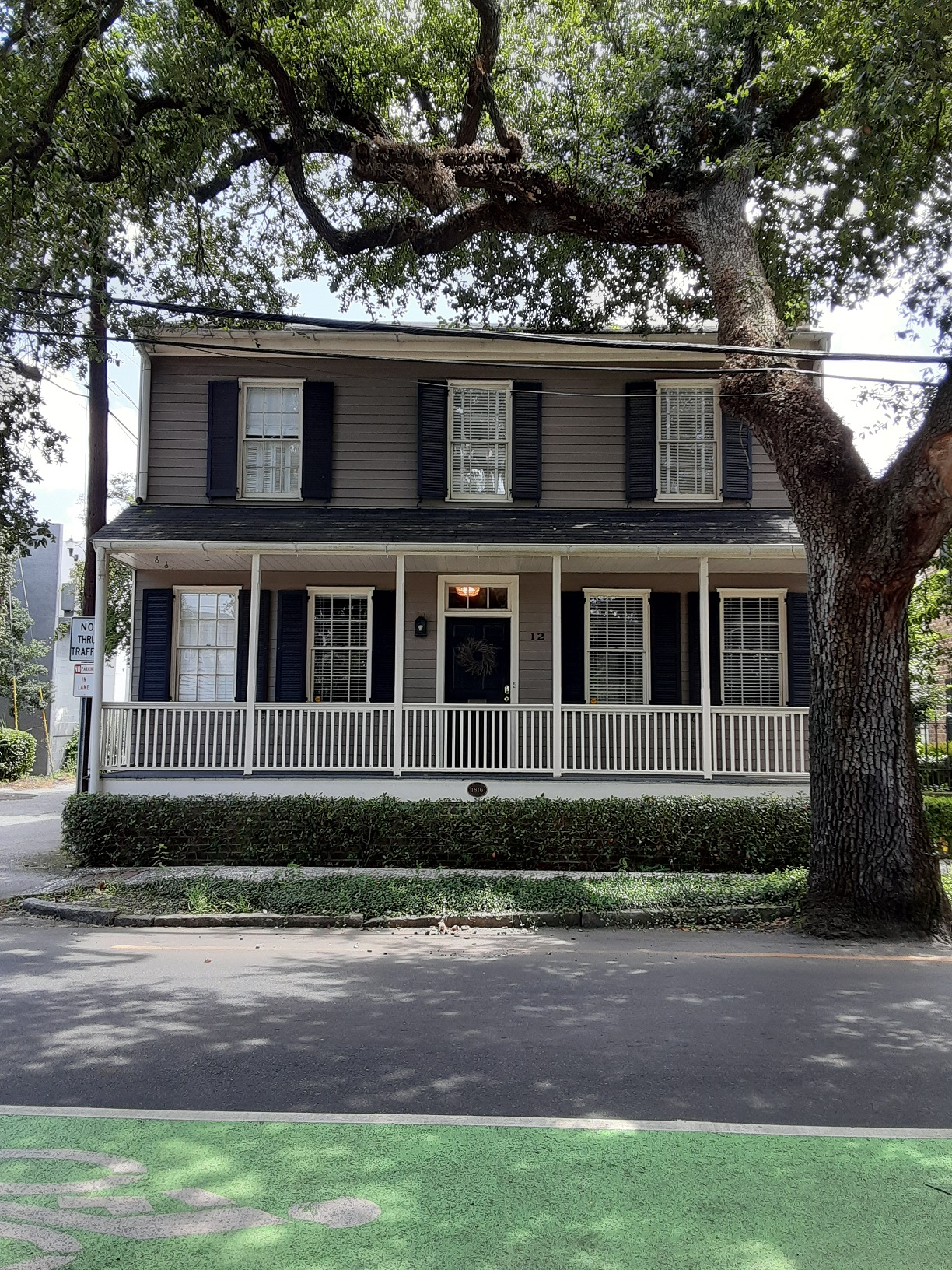
D.D. Williams House, 12 Price Street

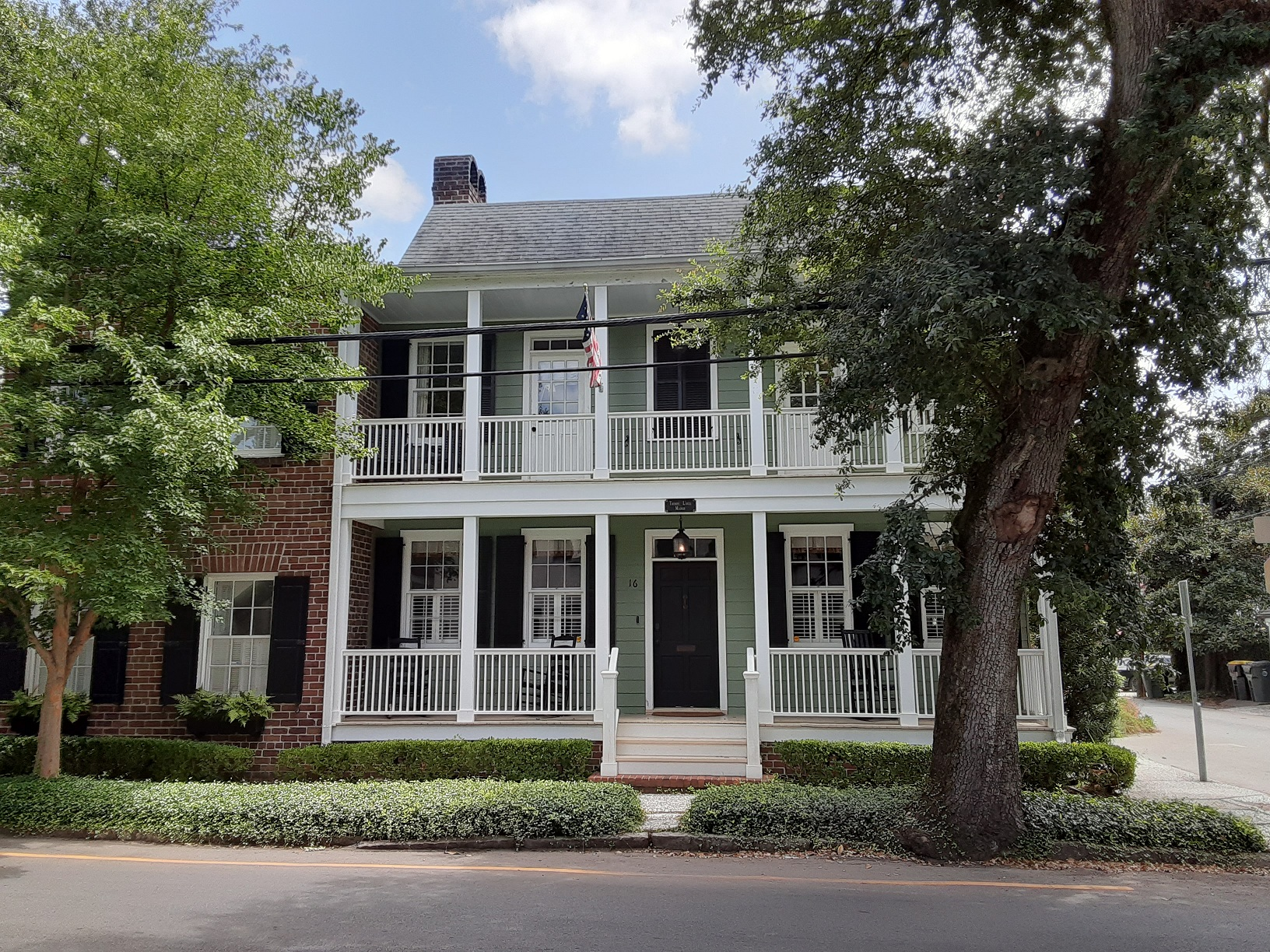
William Williams House, 16 Price Street

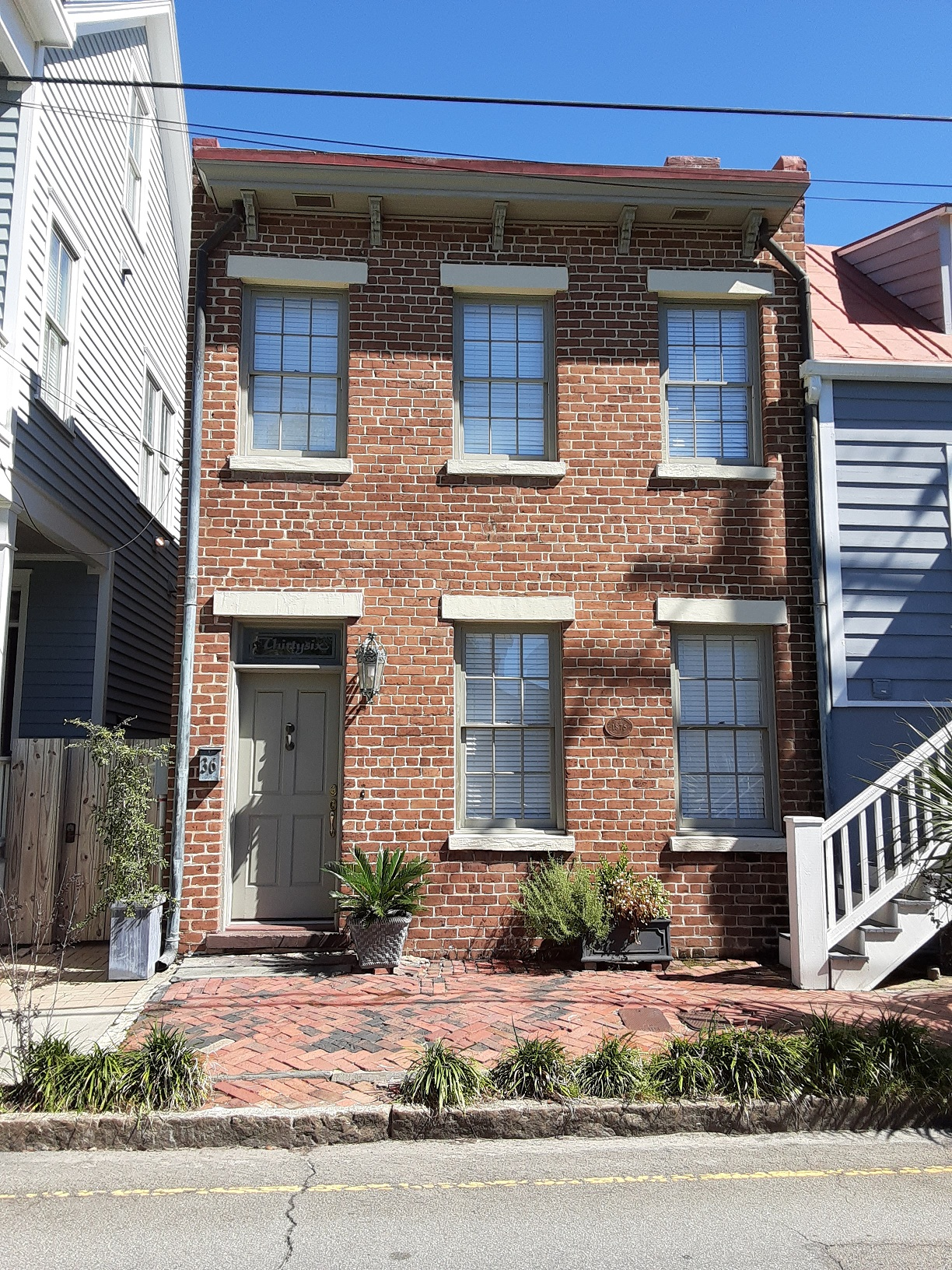
William Wescott House, 36 Price Street

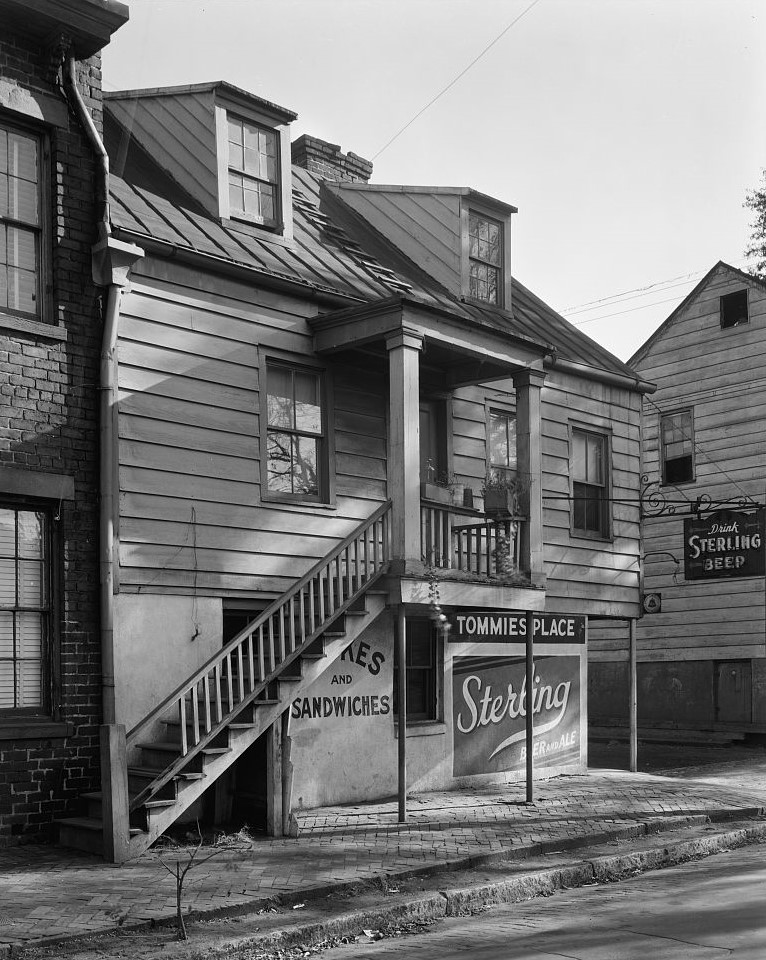
38 Price Street in its time as Tommie's Place deli

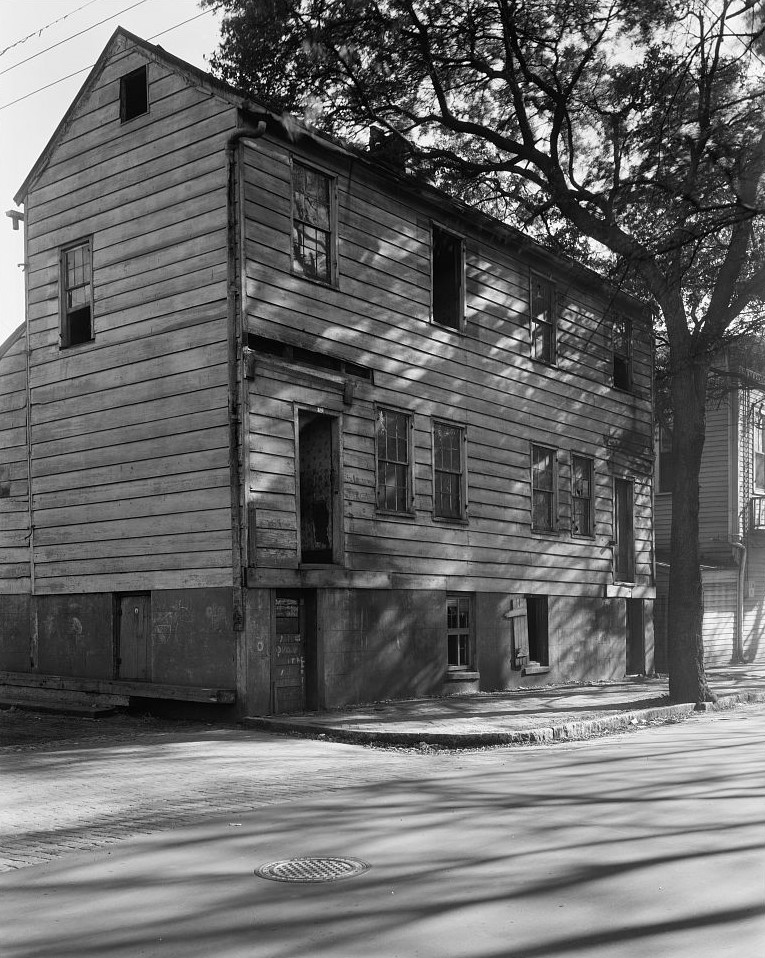
Stephen Timmons Cottage, 40 Price Street (now demolished)

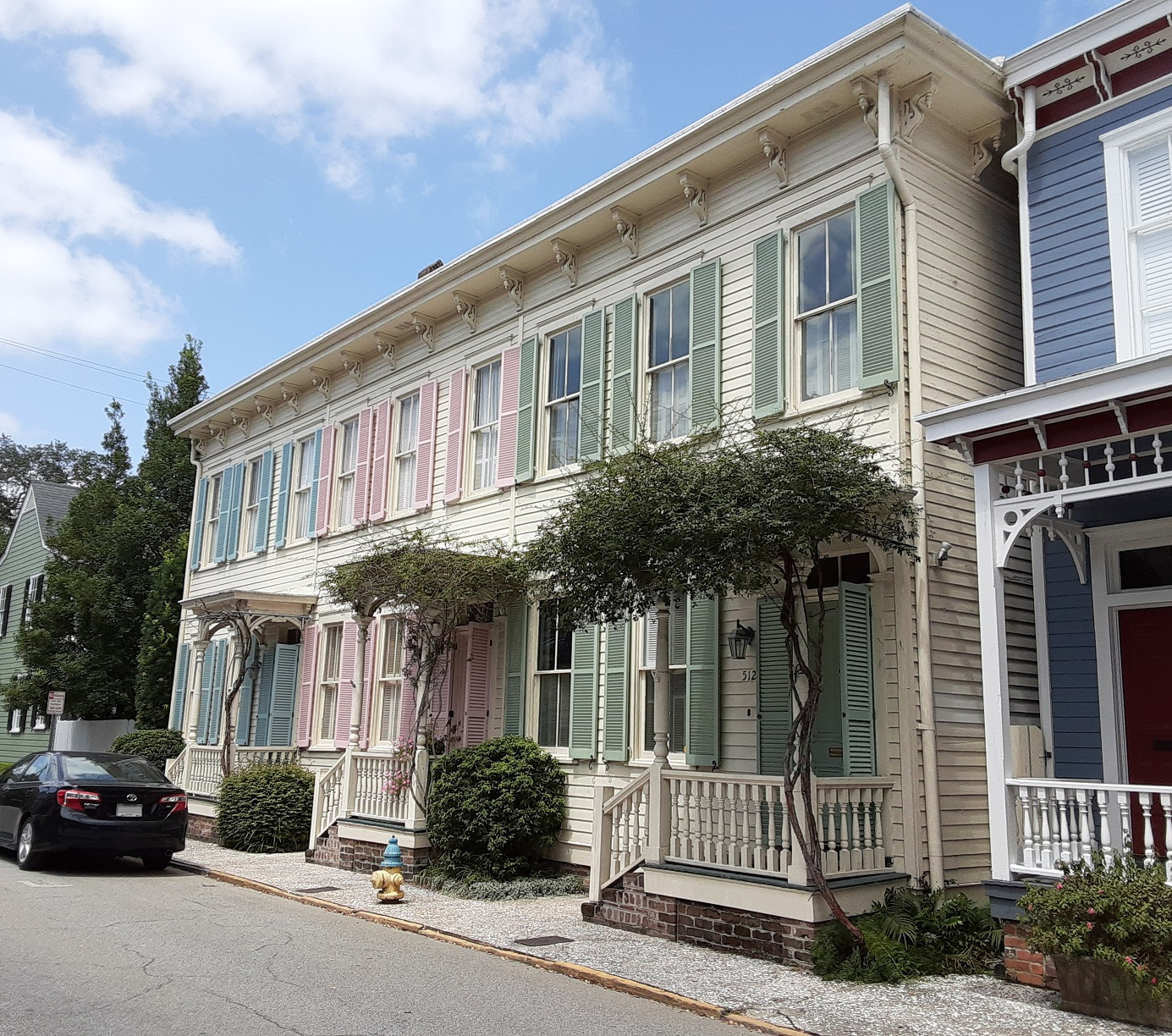
Margaret Prindible Property, 508–512 East Bryan Street

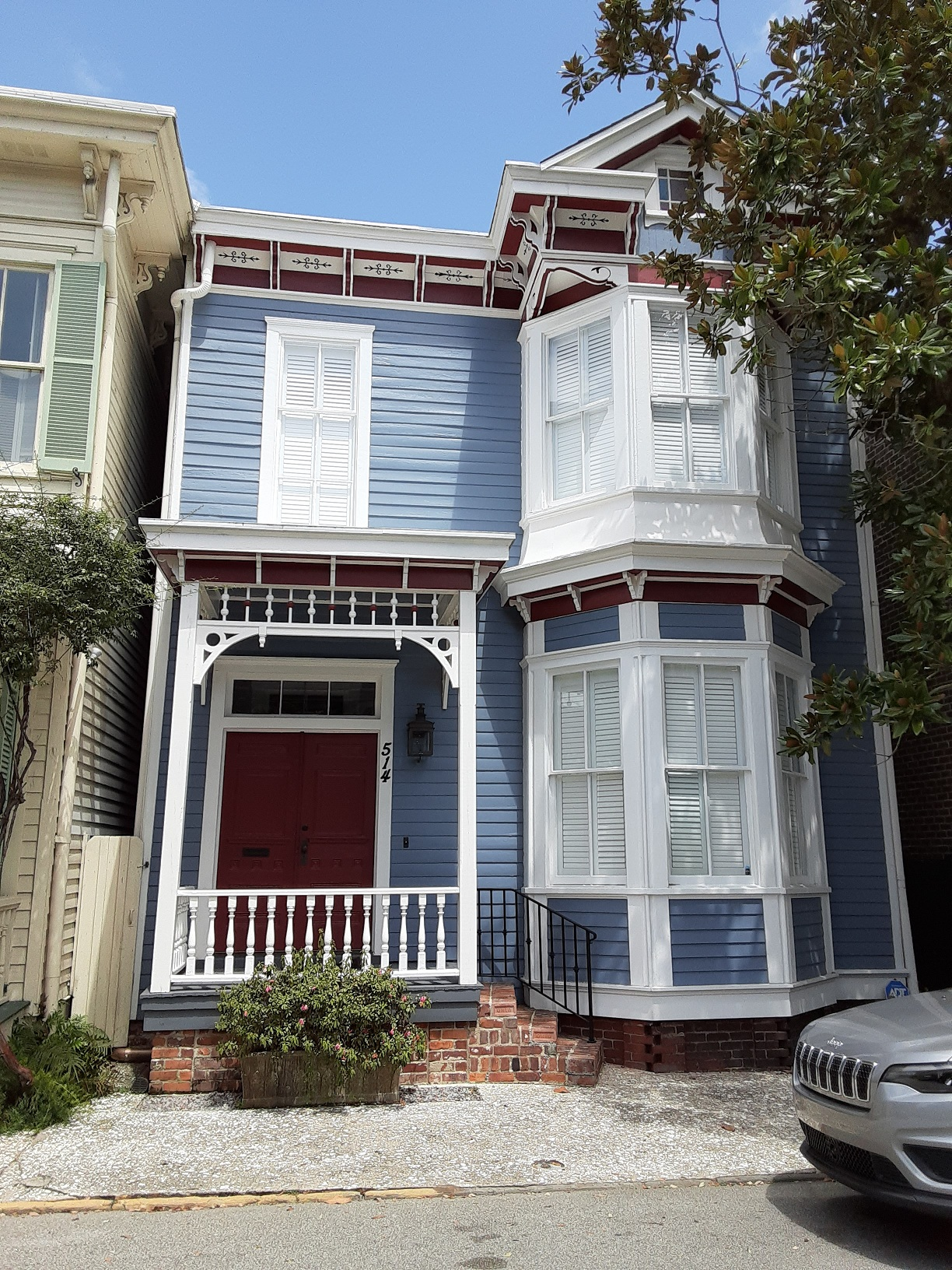
Mary Gildea House, 514 East Bryan Street

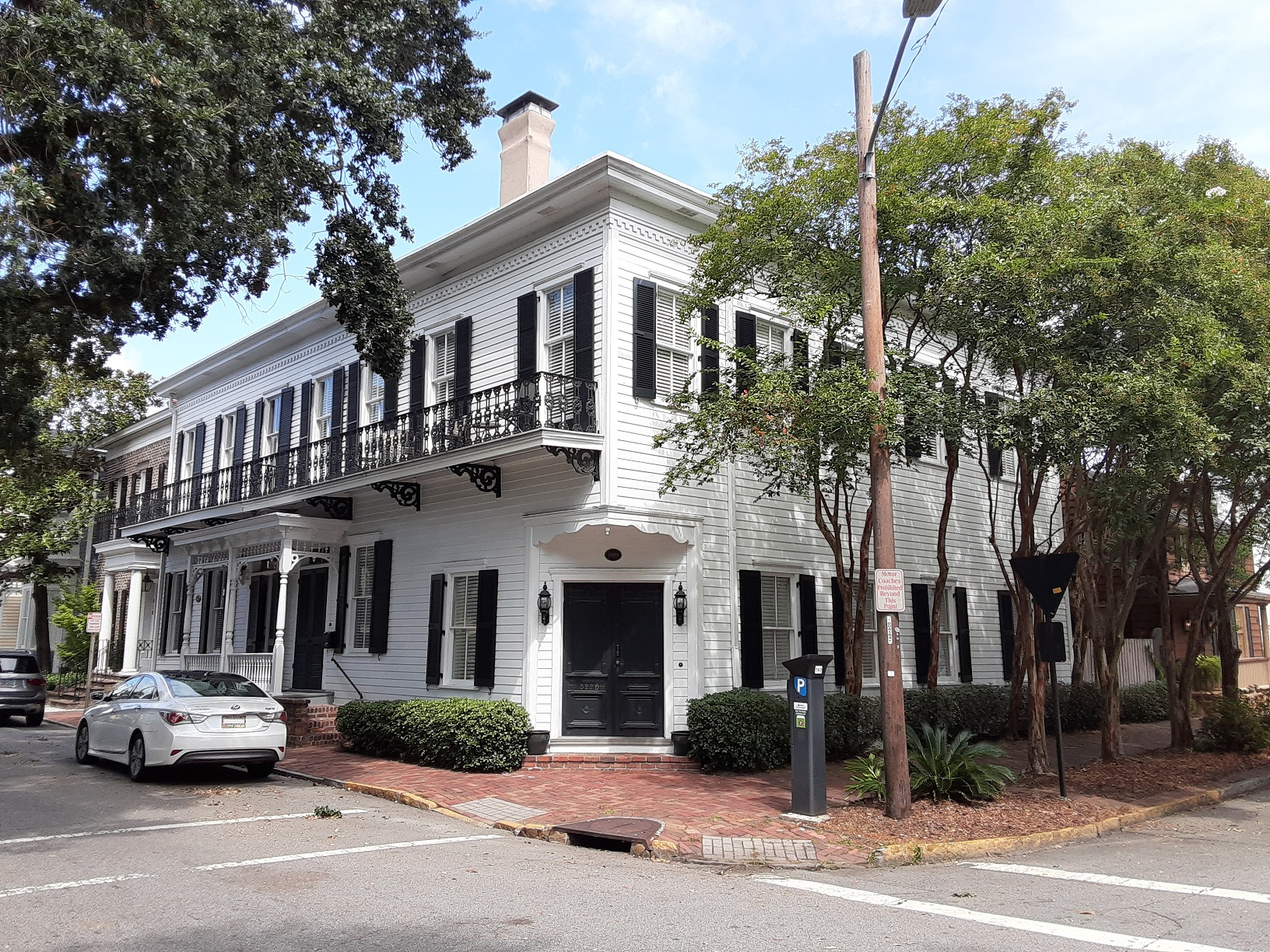
Mary Horrigan Property, 520–522 East Bryan Street

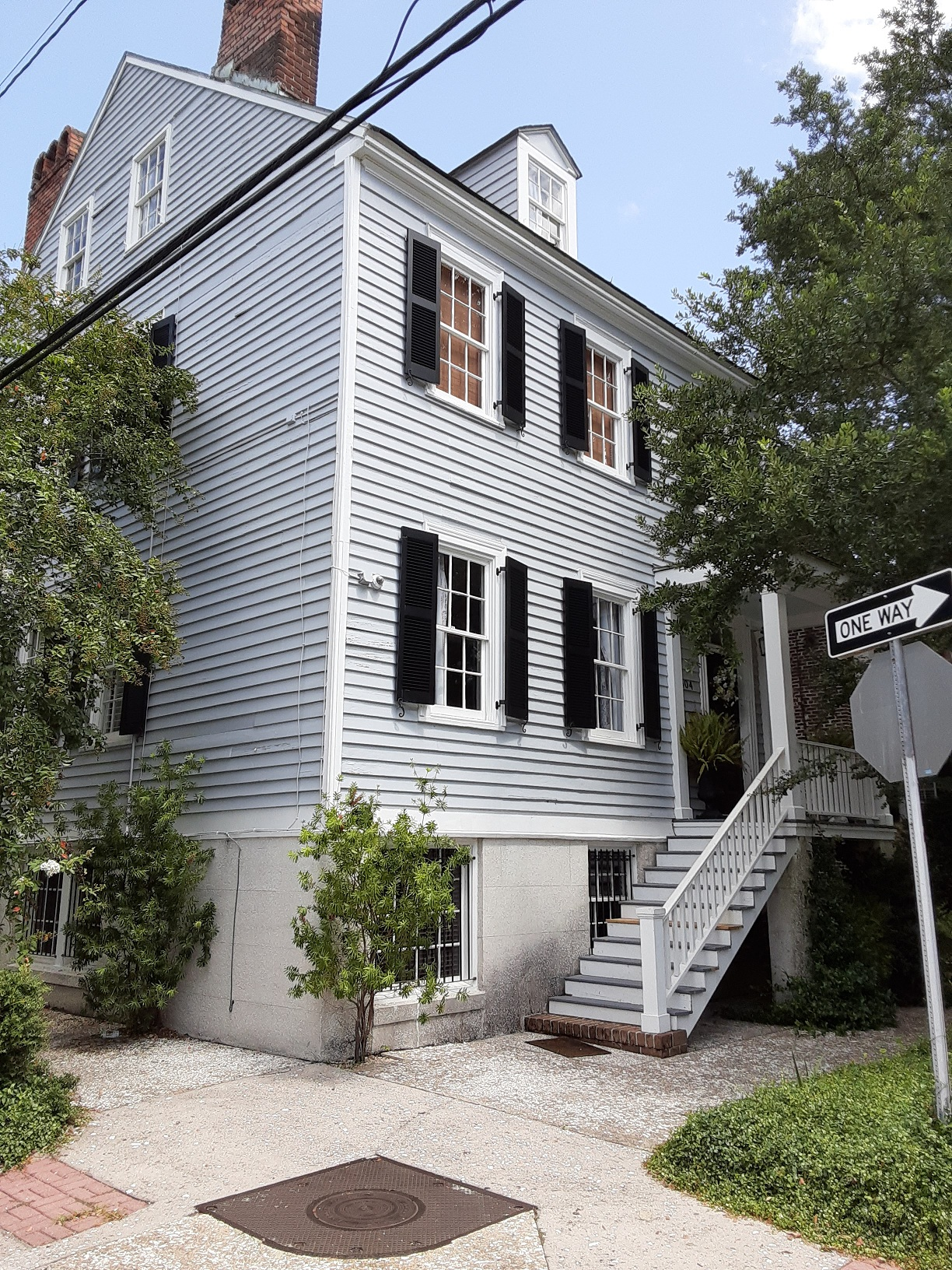
Anne Pitman House, 504 East St. Julian Street

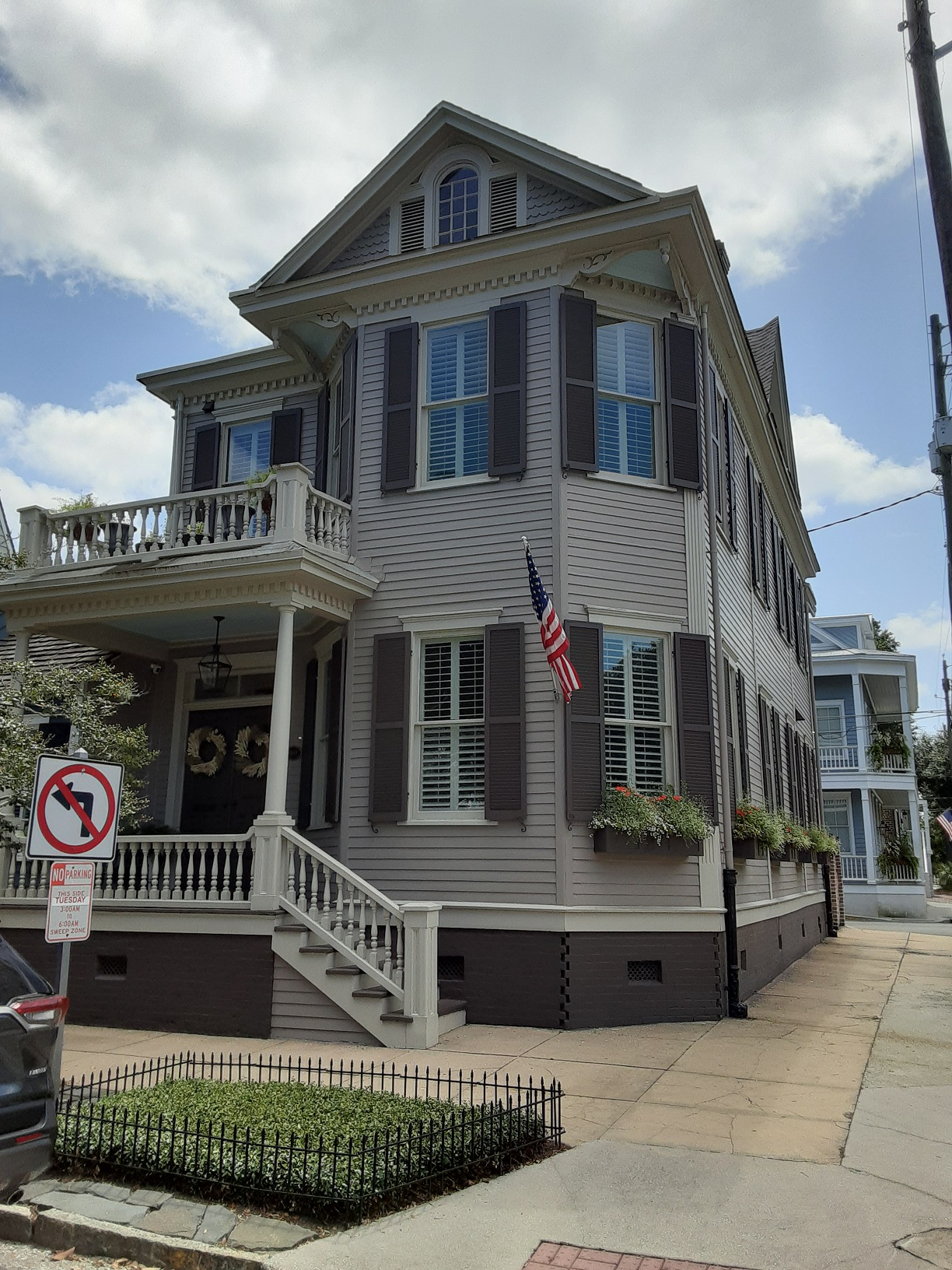
William Flood House, 501 East St. Julian Street

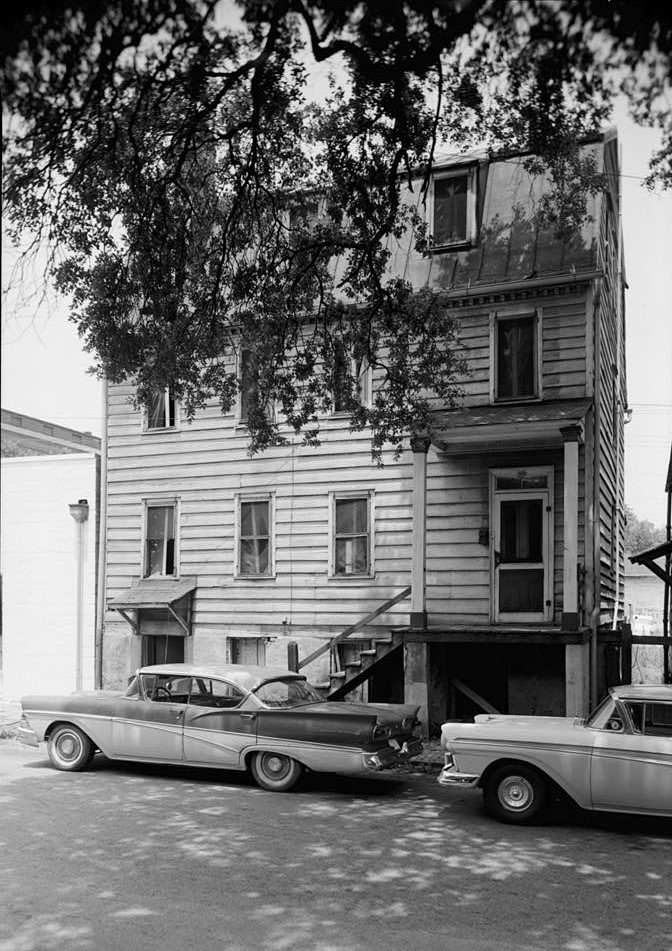
Hampton Lillibridge House, 507 East St. Julian Street

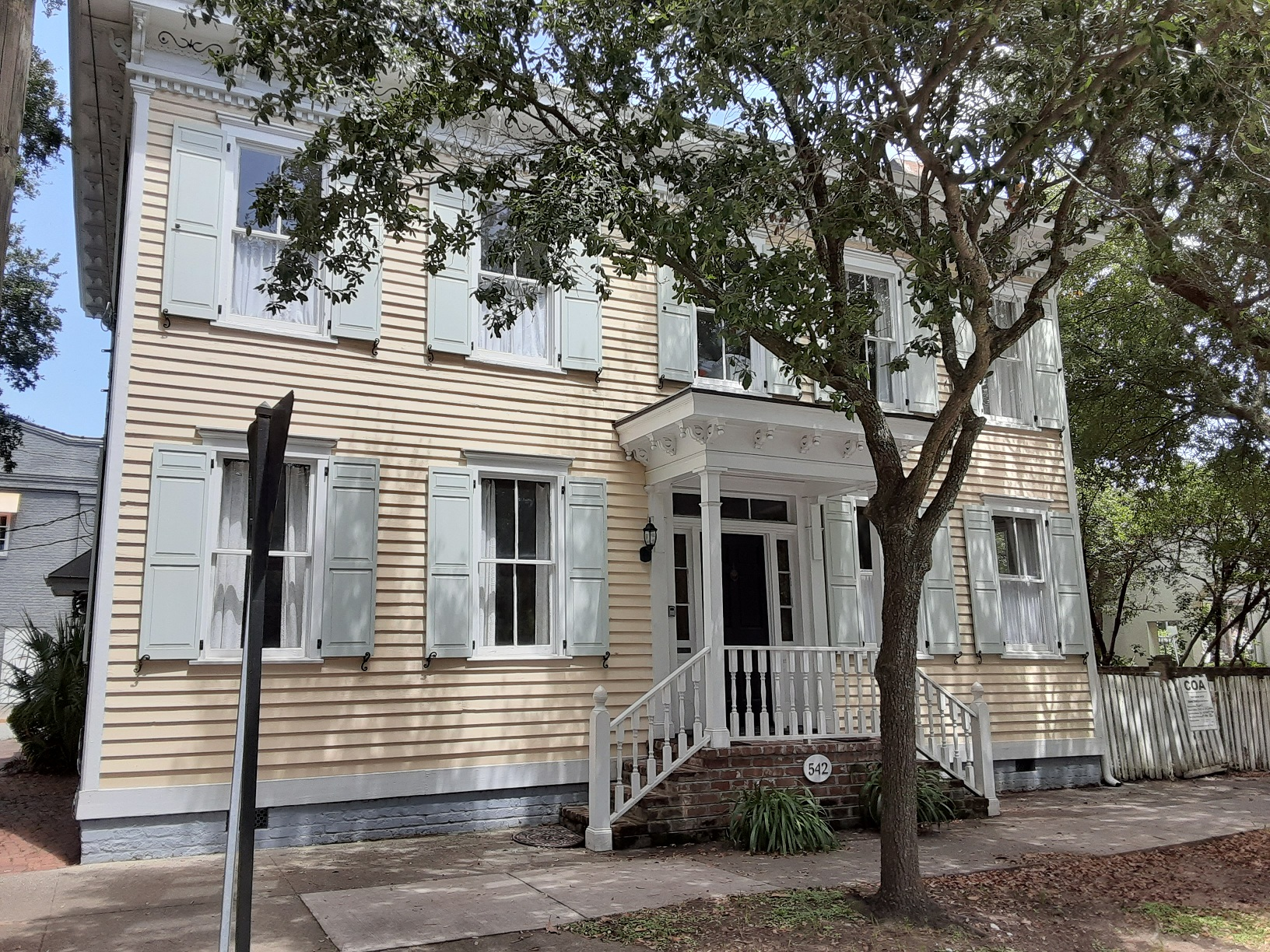
Morty Dorgan Property (1), 542 East St. Julian Street

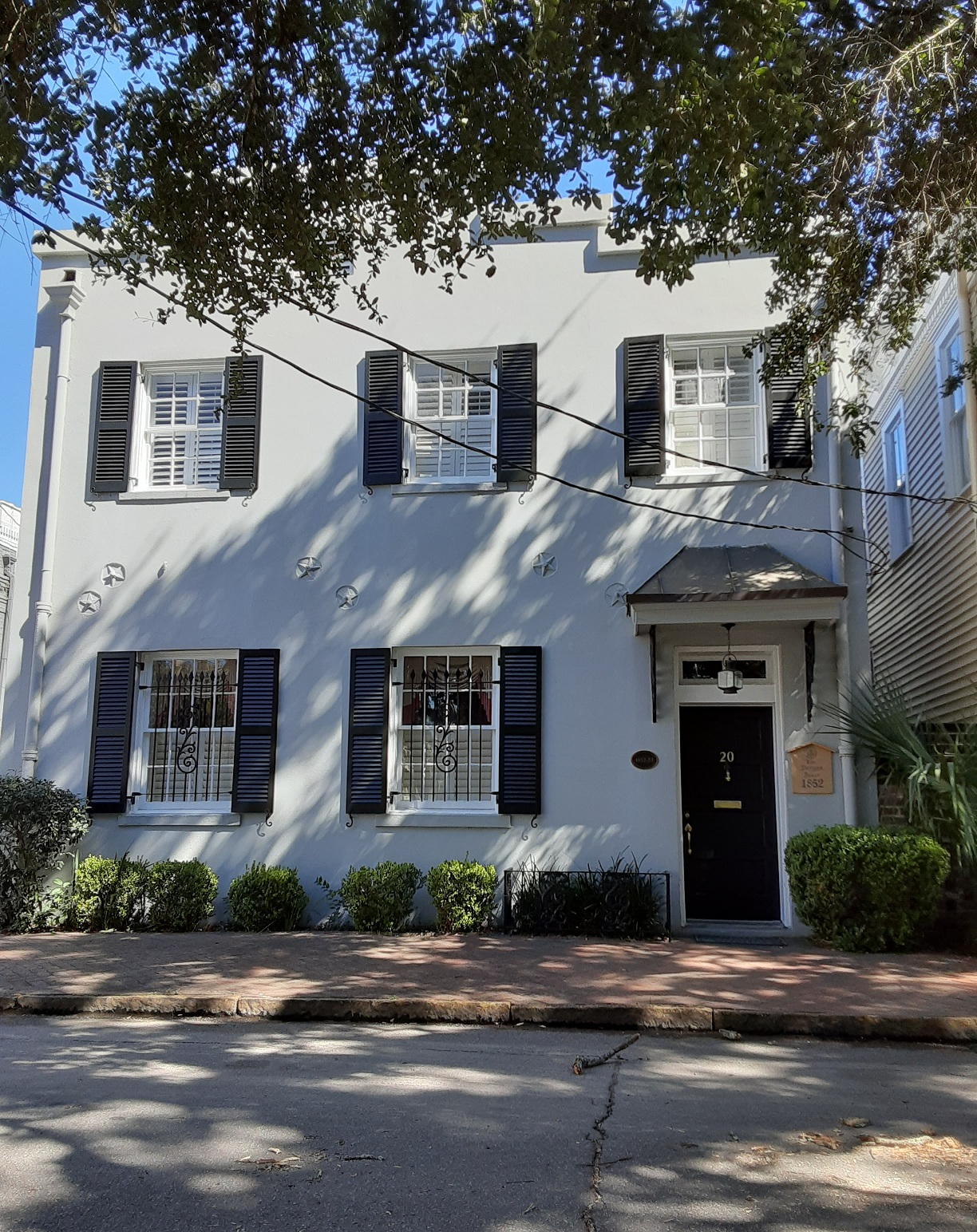
Morty Dorgan Property (2), 20 Houston Street

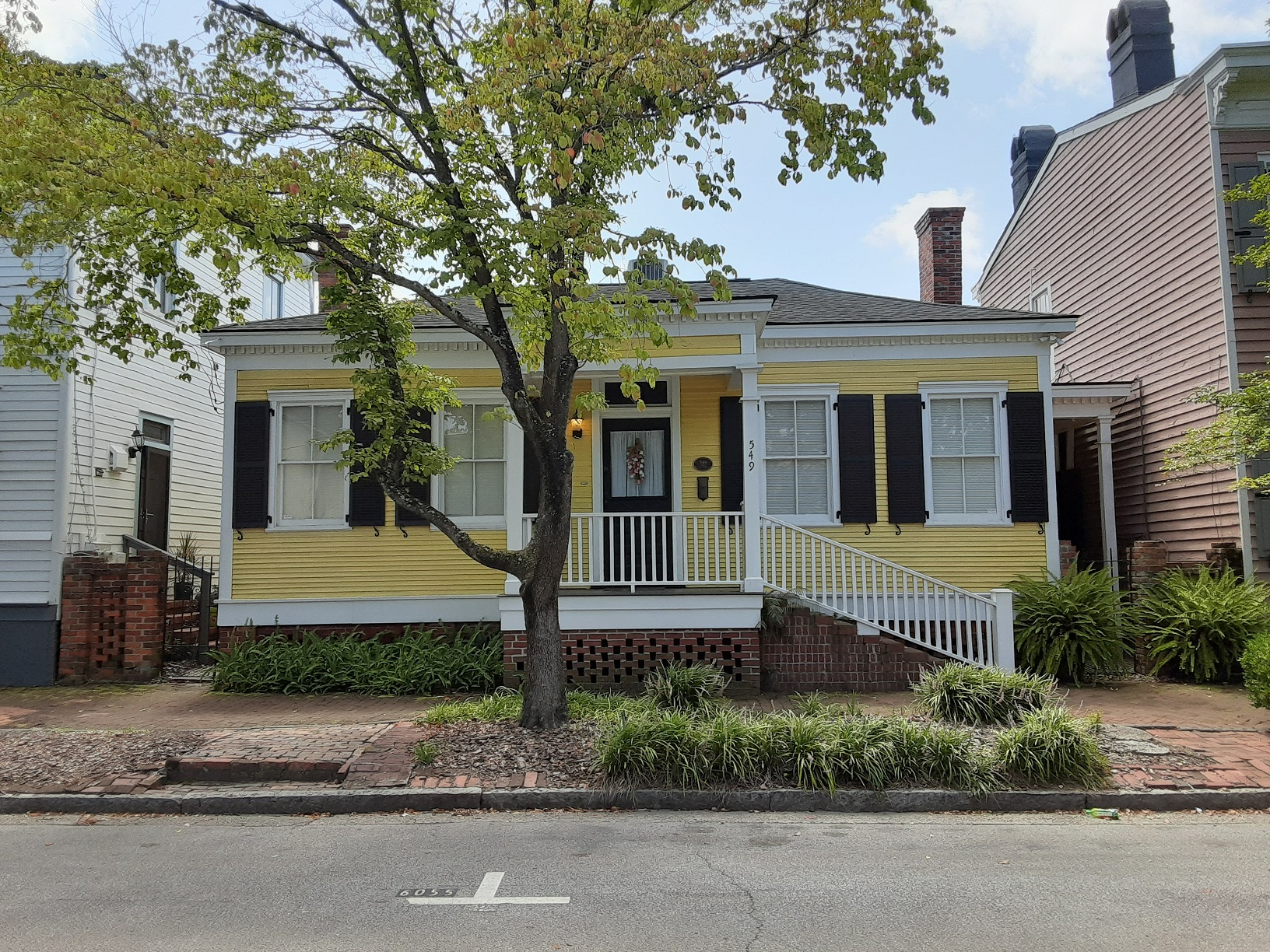
Mary Ferguson House, 549 East St. Julian Street

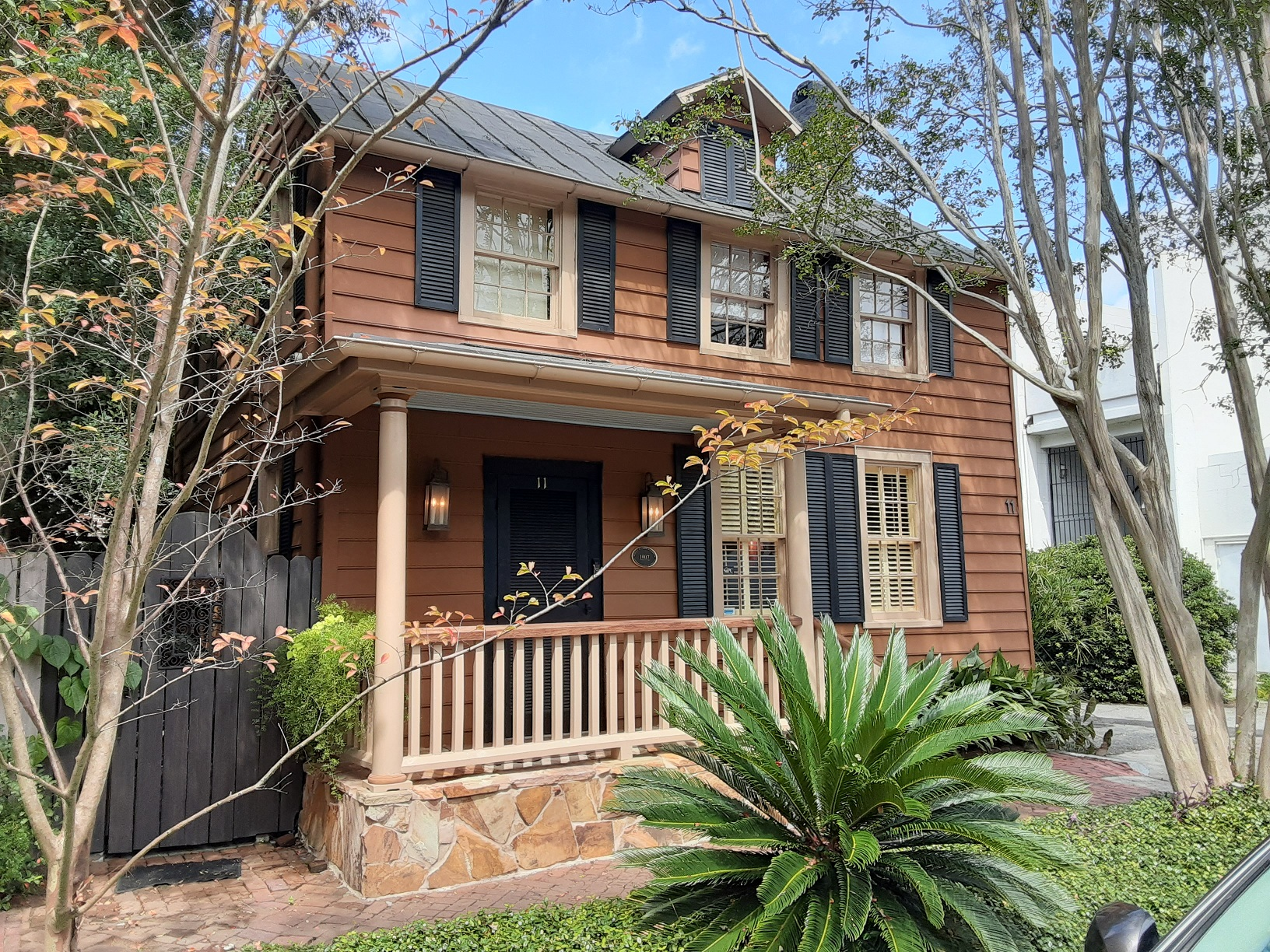
Joseph Wilkinson House, 11 Houston Street

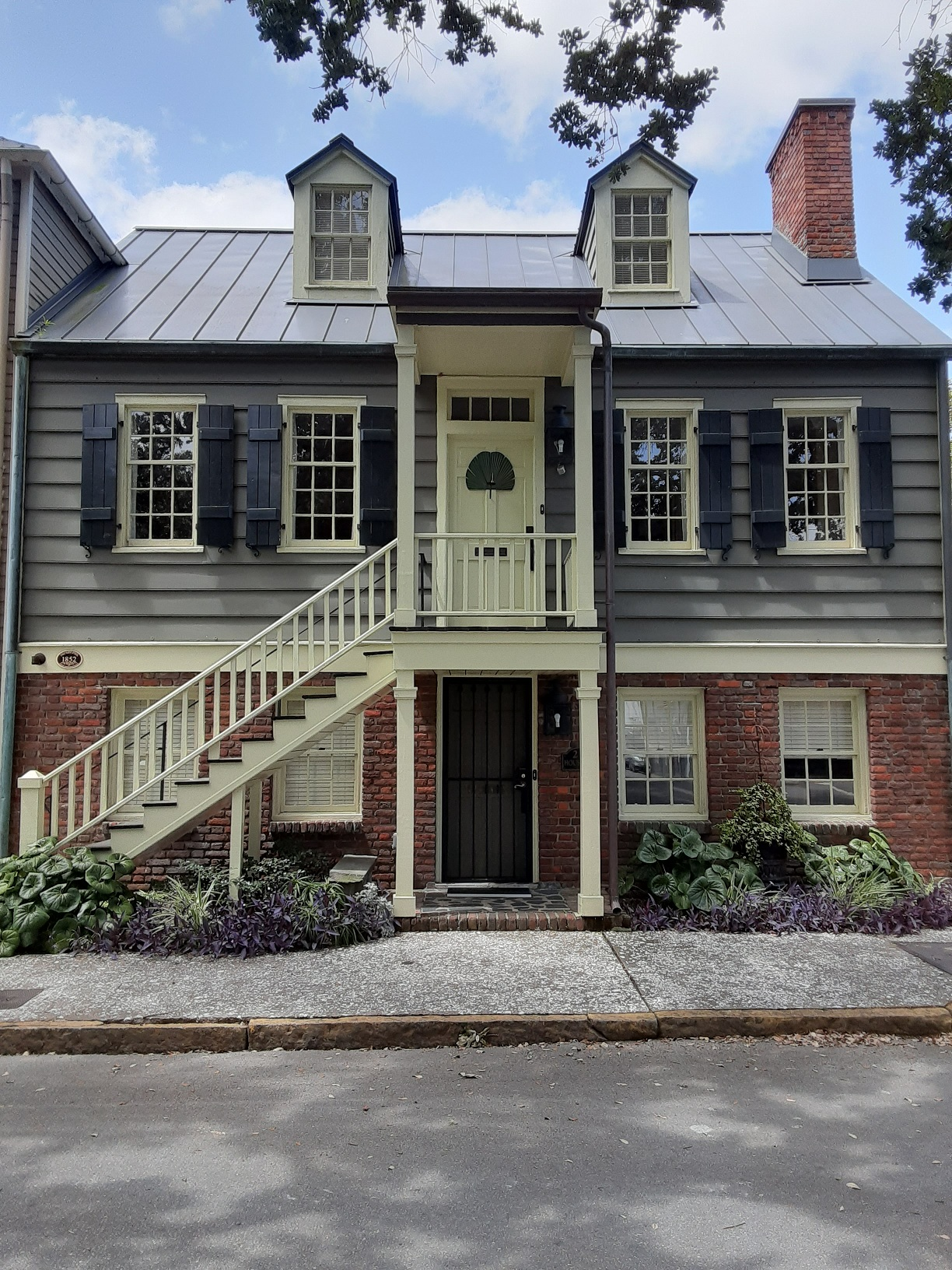
Simon Mirault House, 21 Houston Street

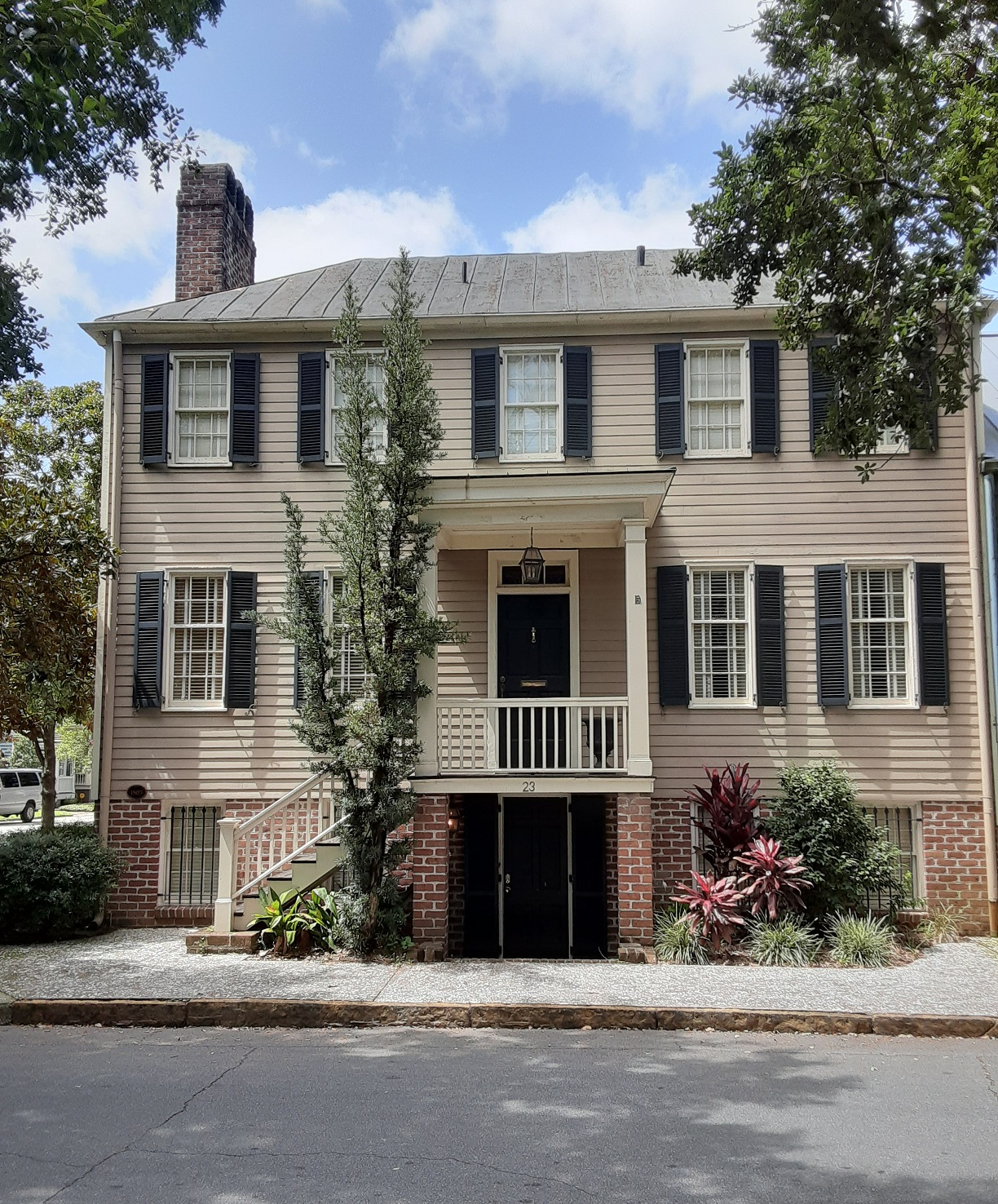
Joachim Hartstene House, 23 Houston Street

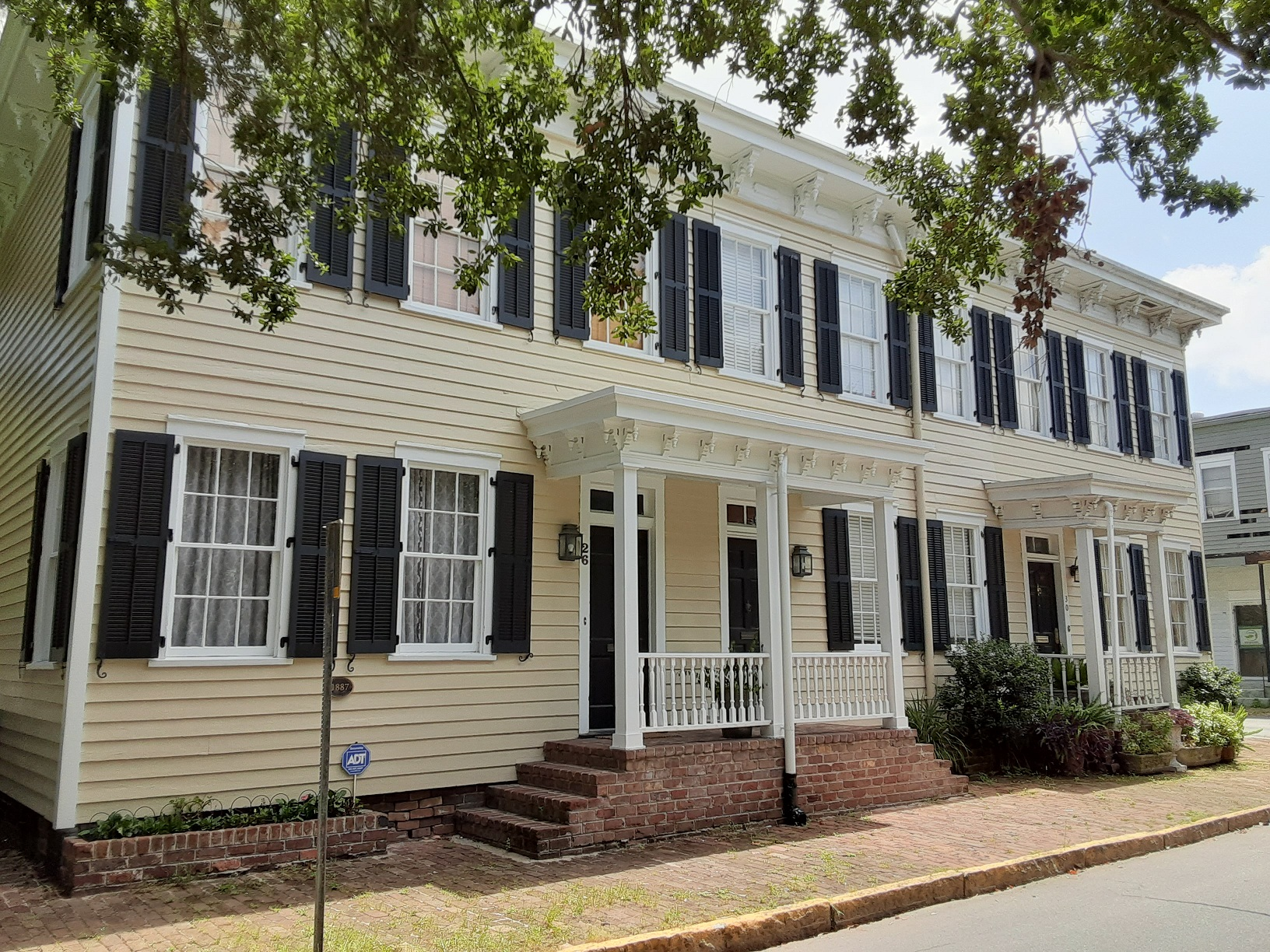
Catherine McCarthy Property, 26–30 Houston Street

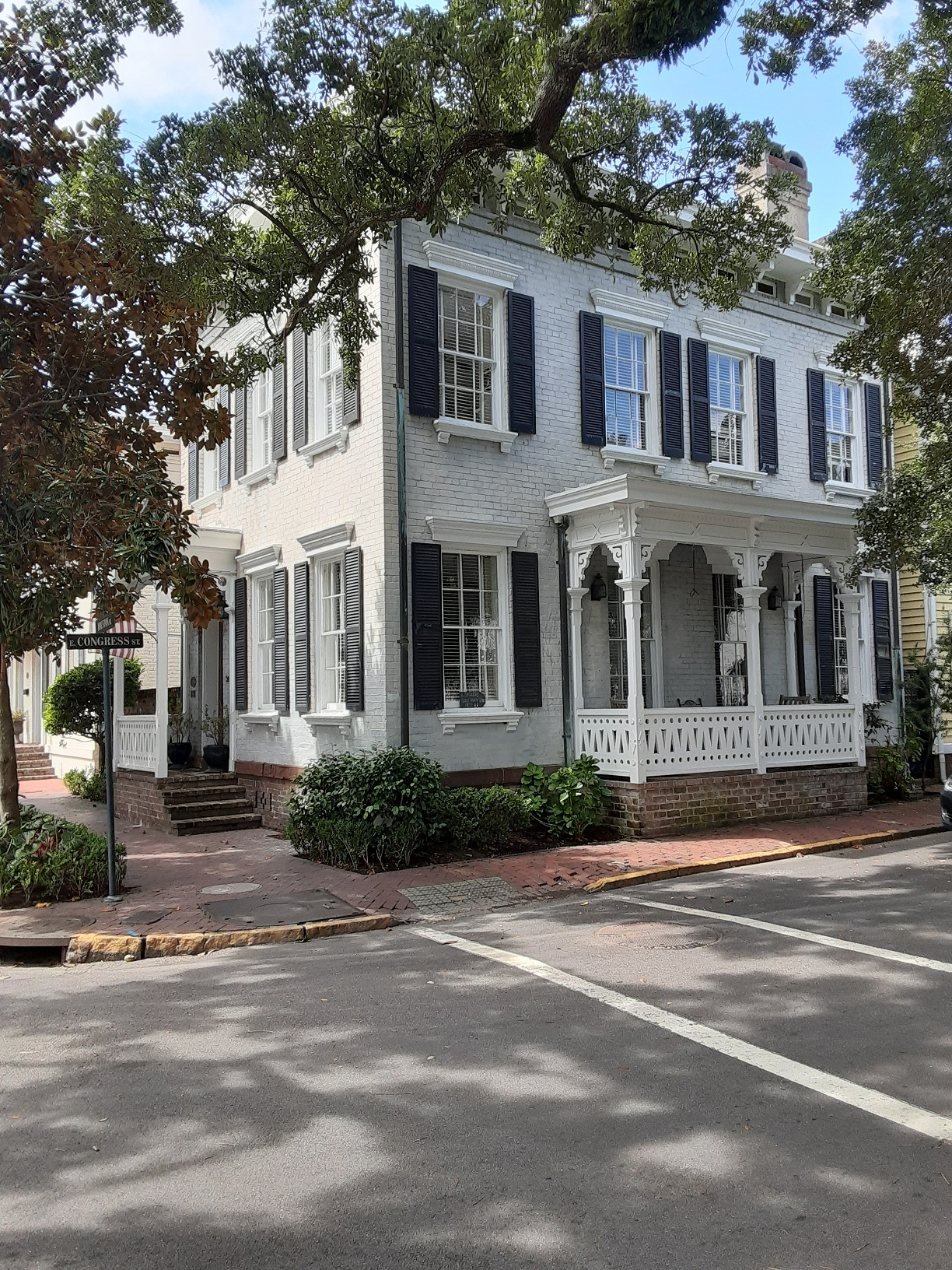
Laurence Dunn Property (1), 31–33 Houston Street

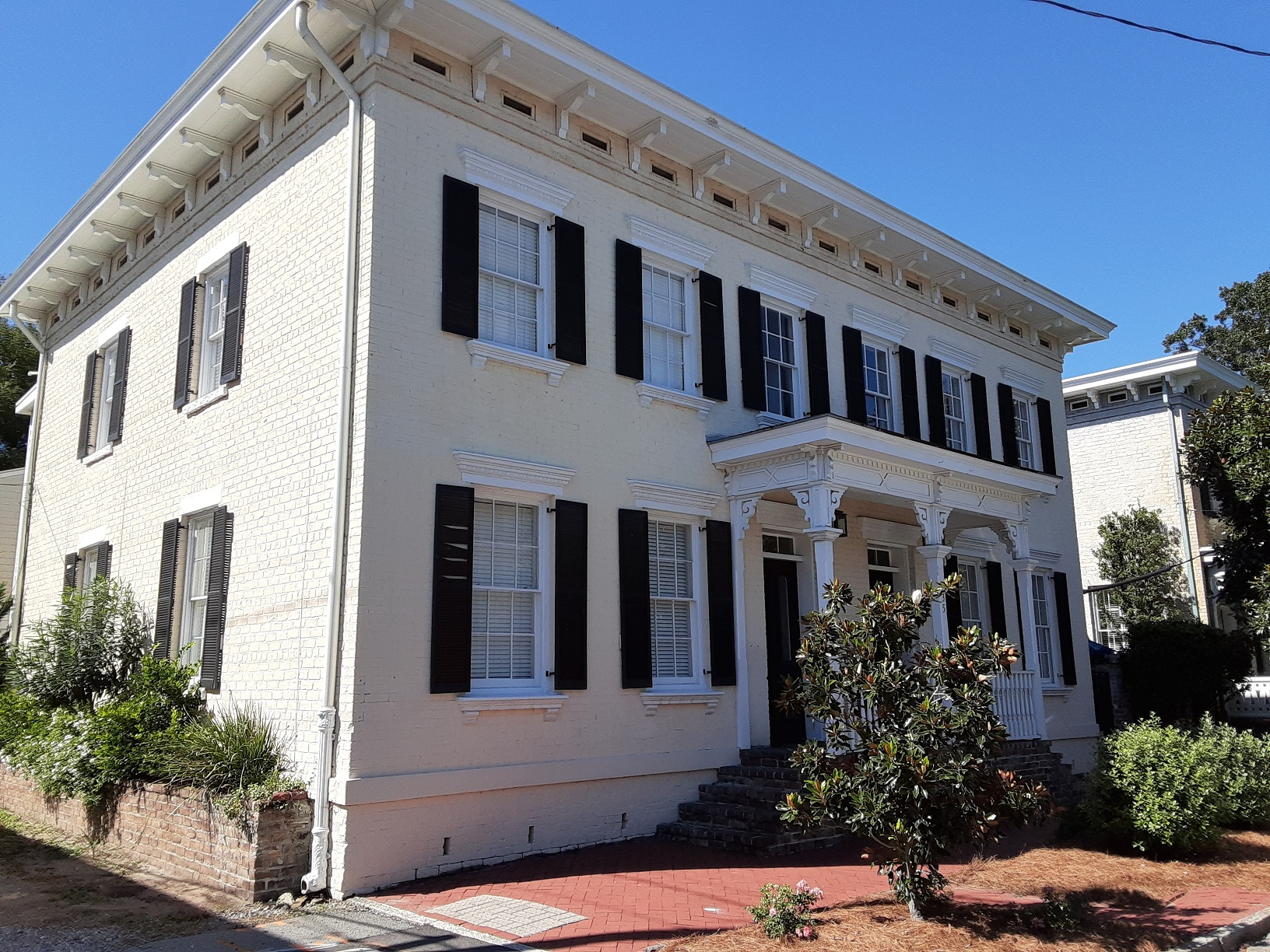
Laurence Dunn Property (2), 35–37 Houston Street

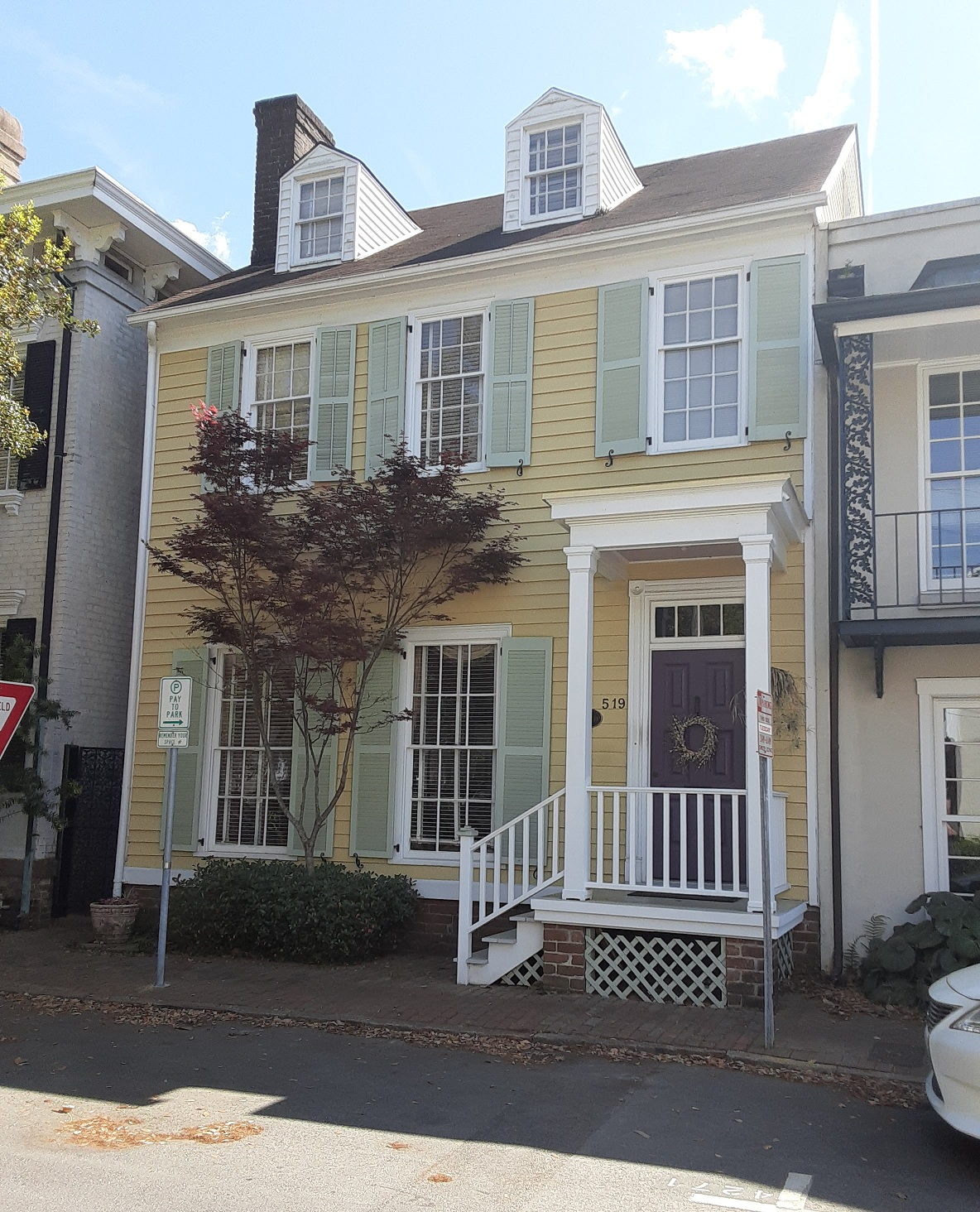
Isabella Brower House, 519 East Congress Street

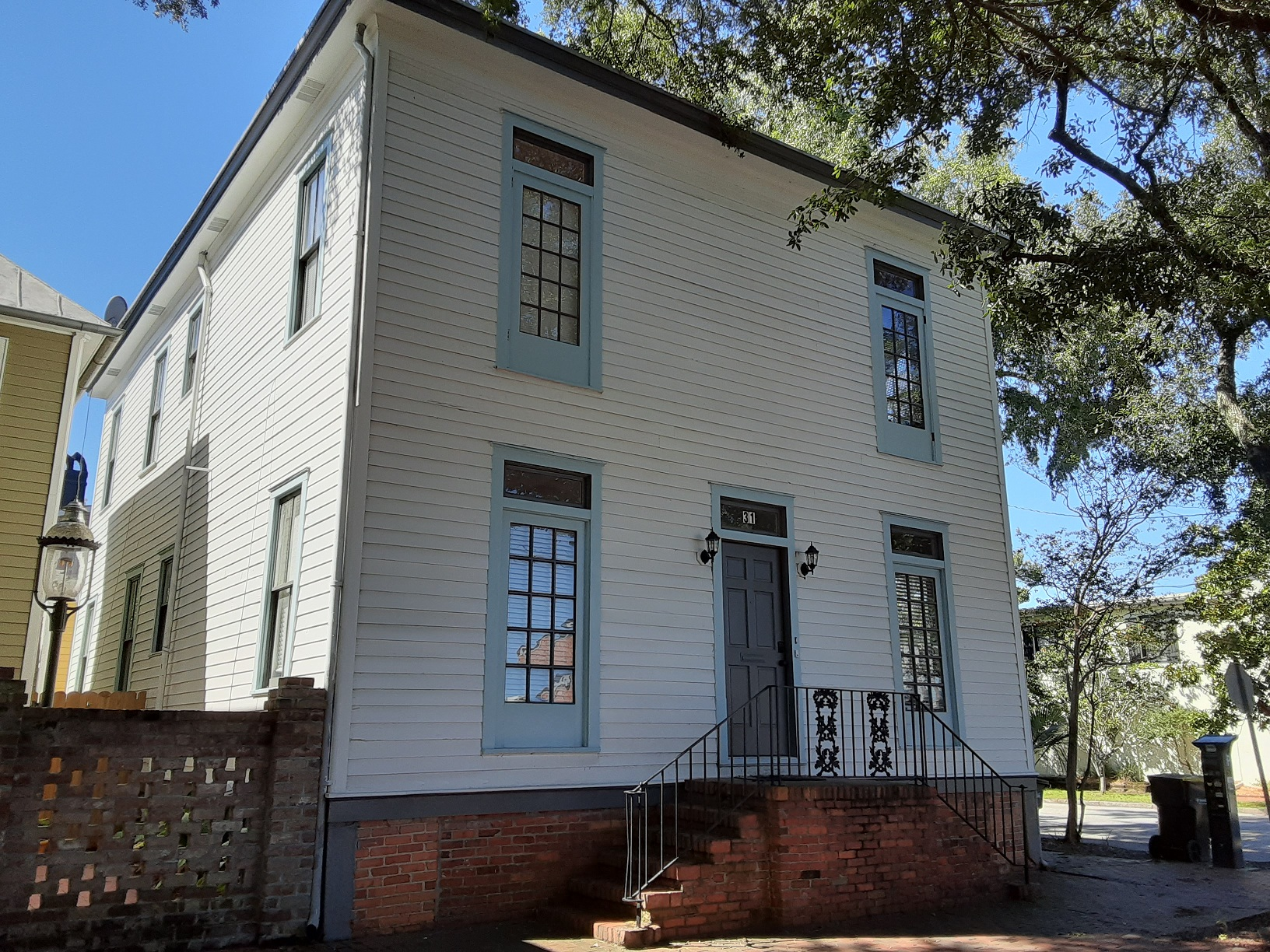
31 East Broad Street

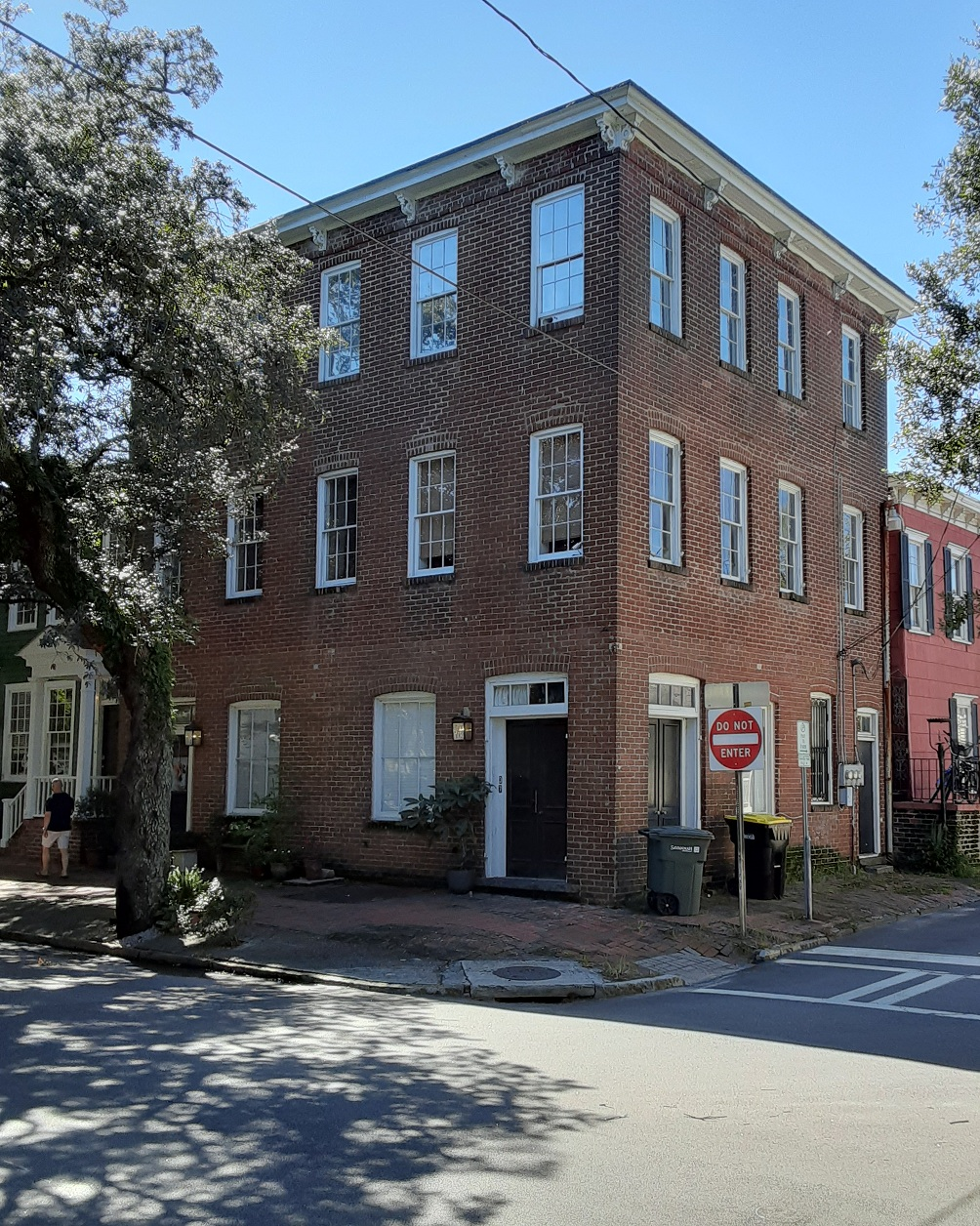
James McMahon House, 37–39 East Broad Street

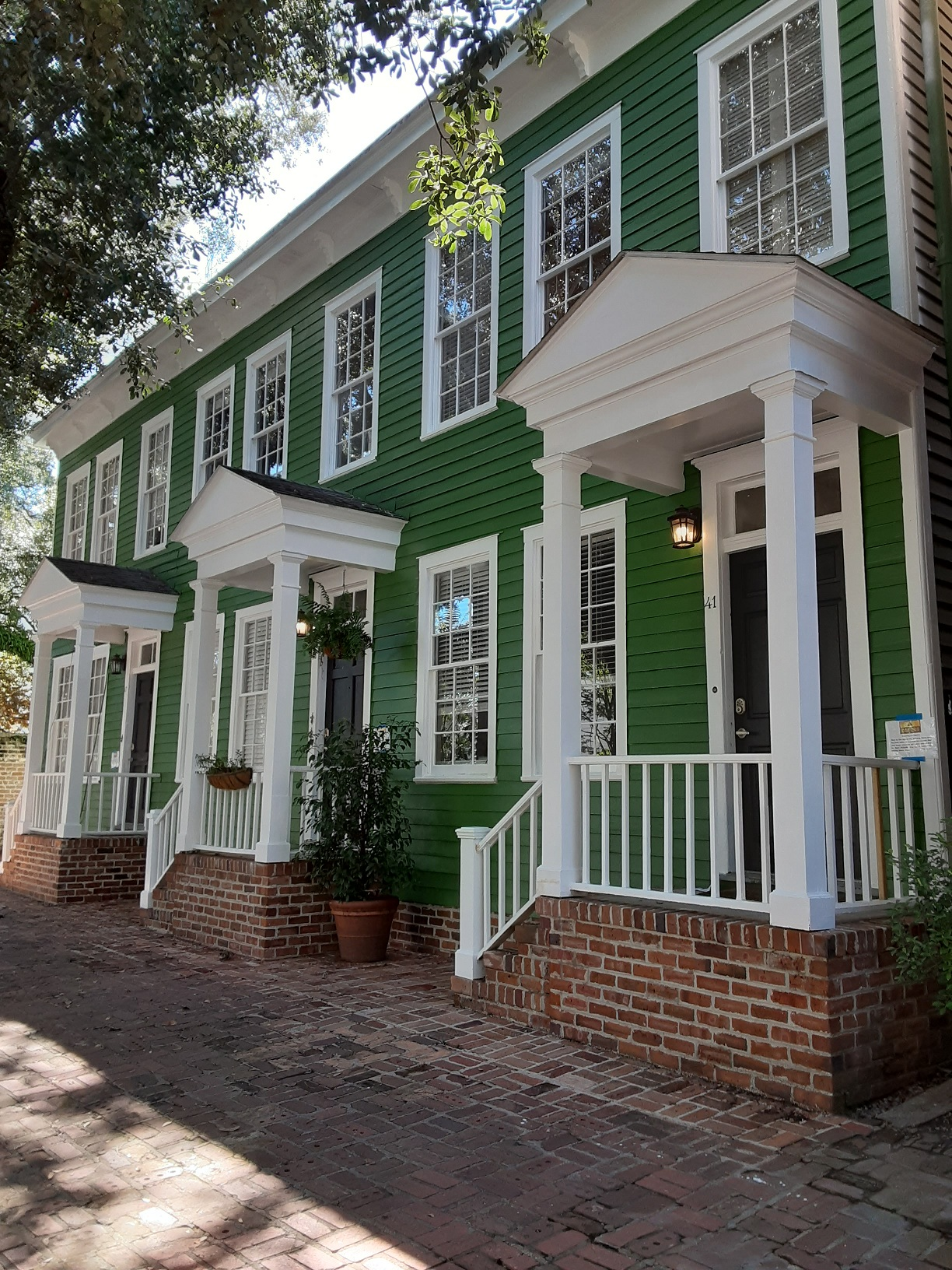
Charles Wood Row House, 41–47 East Broad Street

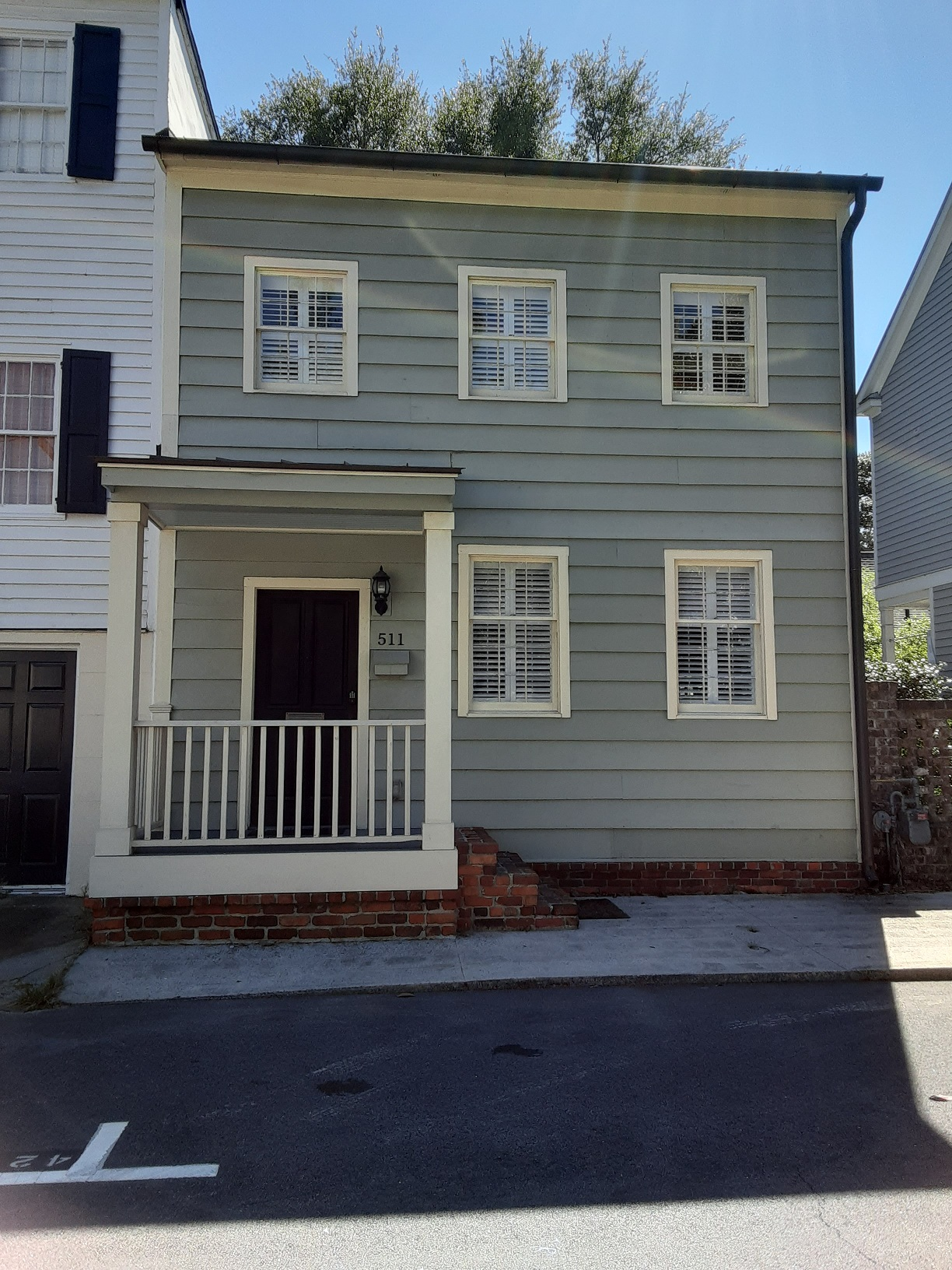
William Gaston House, 511 East Congress Street

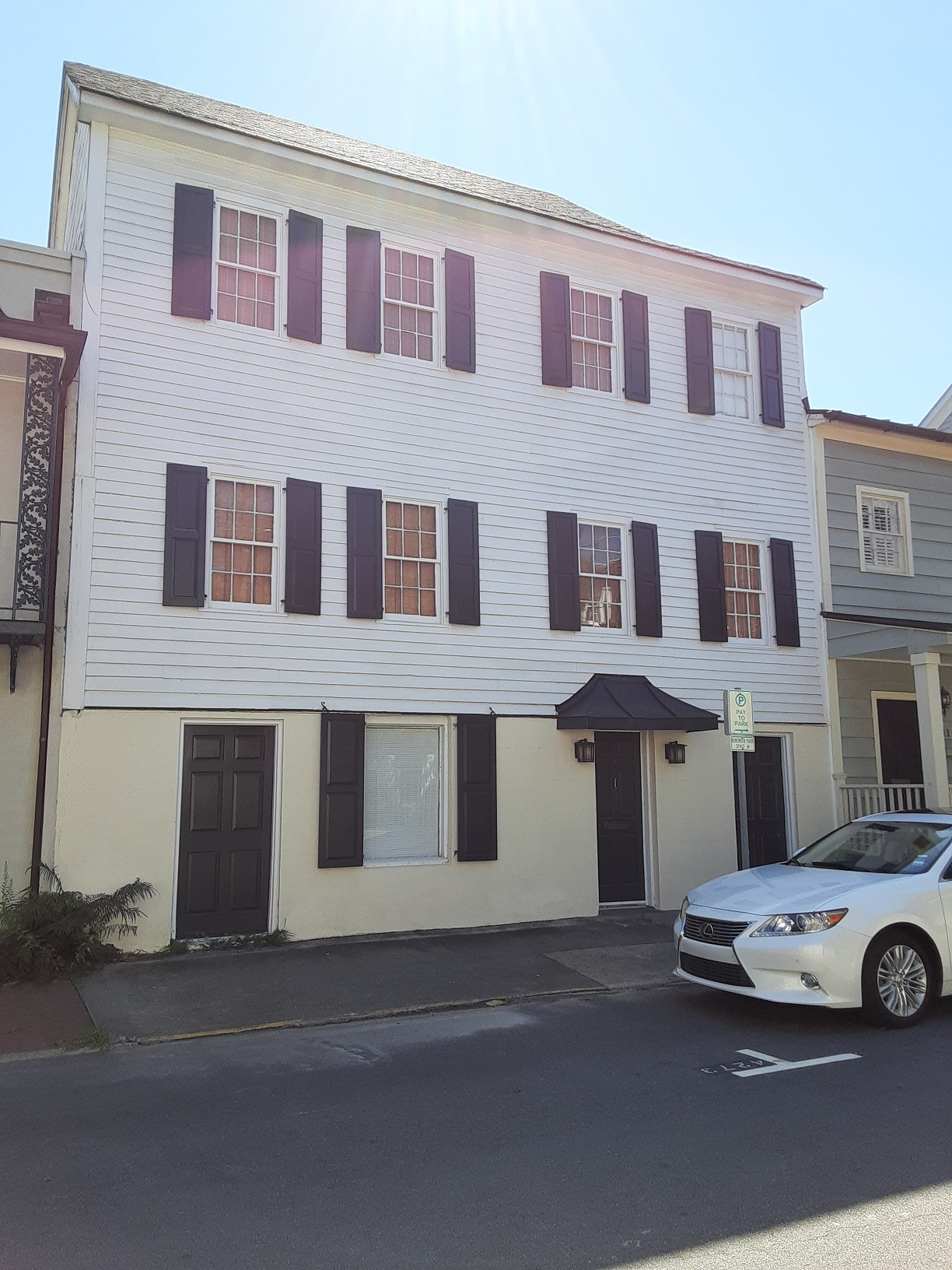
Isabella Mallery House, 513 East Congress Street

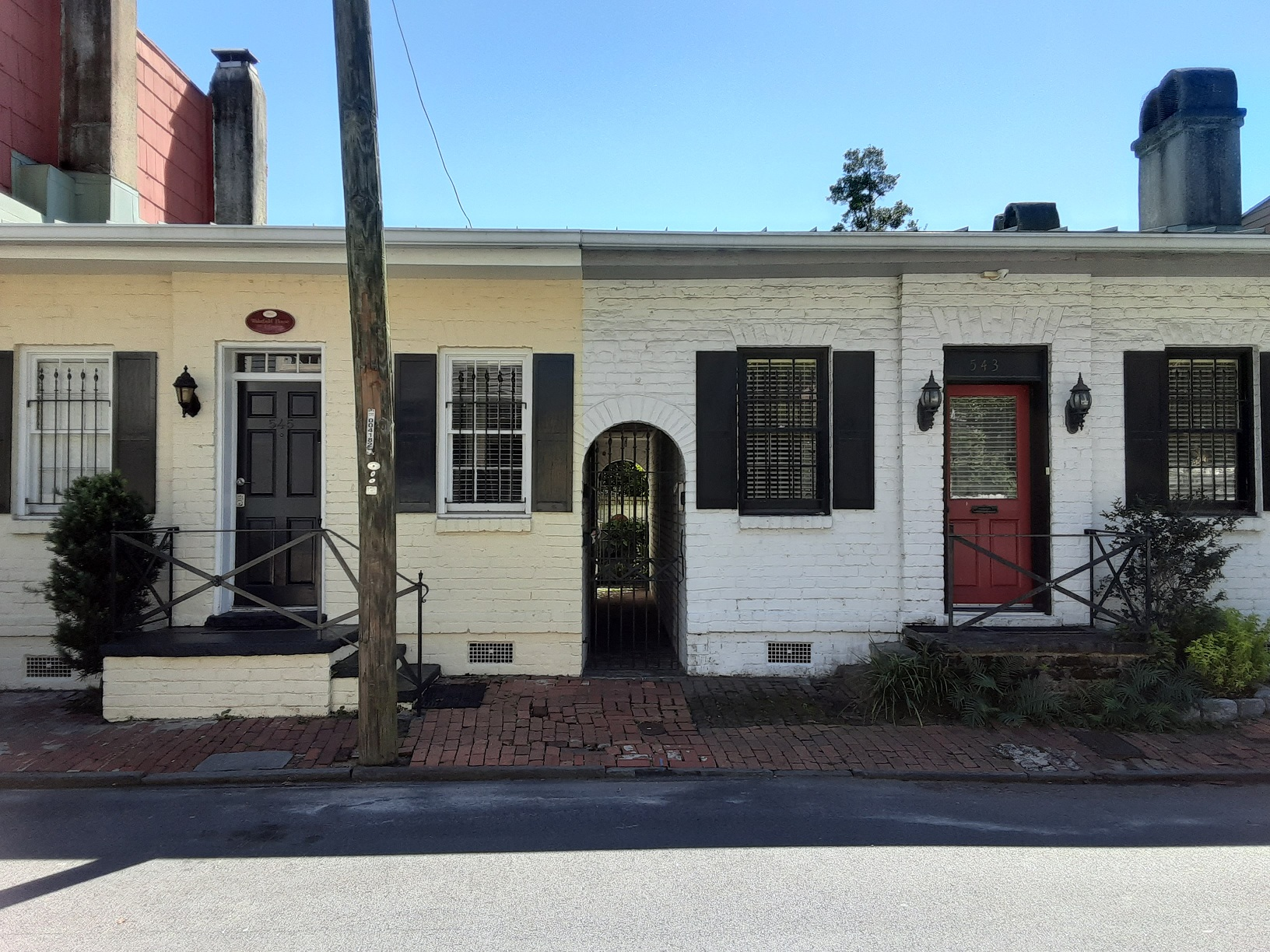
Joseph Burke Properties, 543–545 East Congress Street

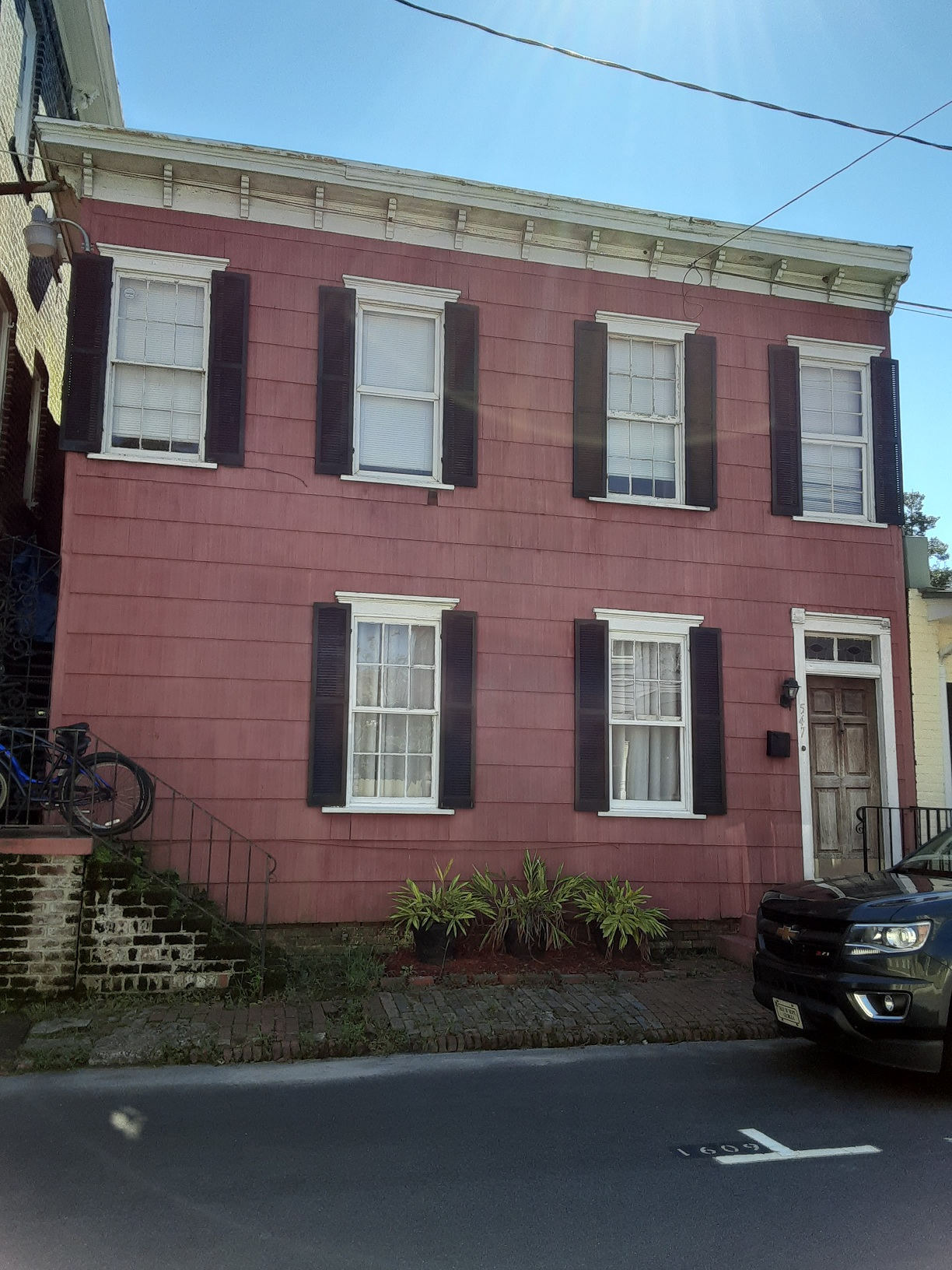
Ann Pinder House, 547 East Congress Street
