= James Arthur Williams =

American preservationist (1930–1990)

Jim Williams
- Williams in 1980
- Born: James Arthur Williams; December 11, 1930; Gordon, Georgia, U.S.
- Died: January 14, 1990 (aged 59); Savannah, Georgia, U.S.
- Occupations: Historic preservationist and antiques dealer
- Known for: An early leader in the Savannah, Georgia, historic preservation movement, as well as the main character in the Midnight in the Garden of Good and Evil book and movie

James Arthur Williams (December 11, 1930 – January 14, 1990) was an American antiques dealer and a historic preservationist based in Savannah, Georgia. He played an active role in the preservation of the Savannah Historic District for over 35 years.

Williams is the main character in John Berendt's book Midnight in the Garden of Good and Evil, published four years after Williams's 1990 death. After four trials for an alleged murder that occurred in his house in 1981, he was acquitted in 1989.

== Life ==
James Arthur Williams was born in 1930 in Gordon, Georgia, to Arthur Costlar, a barber, and Blanche Brooks Williams. He studied piano at Middle Georgia College and interior design at Ringling College in Sarasota, Florida. He dropped out of Ringling after the second of three years and enrolled at Mercer University in Macon, Georgia.

After serving briefly in the U.S. Air Force, in 1952 Williams moved to Savannah, where he began working for Klug's Furniture Company at the corner of Victory Drive and Abercorn Street. He lived on Washington Square.

Williams became a noted antiques dealer after opening a shop, with his friend Jack Kieffer (1915–2007), in 1953.

He was active in the preservation of the Savannah Historic District, and was known for chain-smoking his favorite King Edward cigarillos. In 1955, at the age of 24, Williams bought and restored his first three buildings: the single-level houses located at 541, 543 and 545 East Congress Street. Over the following 35 years, he restored more than fifty homes in Savannah, as well as in the low country of Georgia and South Carolina. Notable Savannah houses he restored include the Odingsells House, the Merault House, the Hampton Lillibridge House (which he had exorcised), James Habersham's Pink House and the Armstrong House.

Williams purchased the 1,800-acre (730 ha) Cabbage Island, an undeveloped barrier island off the Georgia coast, in 1968. He paid $5,000 for it, and later sold it for $900,000. With his newfound fortune, in 1969 Williams purchased Mercer House, an Italianate mansion located at 429 Bull Street which was originally built for General Hugh Mercer, great-grandfather of famed American songwriter Johnny Mercer. At the time of the purchase, the house had been vacant for almost a decade since its former occupants, the Shriners organization, had used the building for their Alee Temple. Over two years, Williams restored the house. After the restoration, it became his residence; he ran his antiques restoration business from the basement of Mercer House, assisted by Barry Thomas (1954–1992), a native of Glasgow, Scotland. His antique shop was behind the house, on Whitaker Street, run by Kenneth Worthy.

Williams held annual Christmas parties at Mercer House, on the eve of the cotillion's debutante ball, which were the highlight of many people's social calendars. Williams had an "in" box and an "out" box for his invitations, depending on whether or not the person was in Williams's favor at the time.

In 1979, during the filming on Monterey Square of The Ordeal of Dr. Mudd, starring Dennis Weaver, Williams hung a flag of Nazi Germany outside of a window at Mercer House in an attempt to disrupt the shoot, after the film company declined to make a donation to the local humane society (of whom Jack Kieffer was president), as Williams had requested. The Congregation Mickve Israel, located across the square, complained to the city.

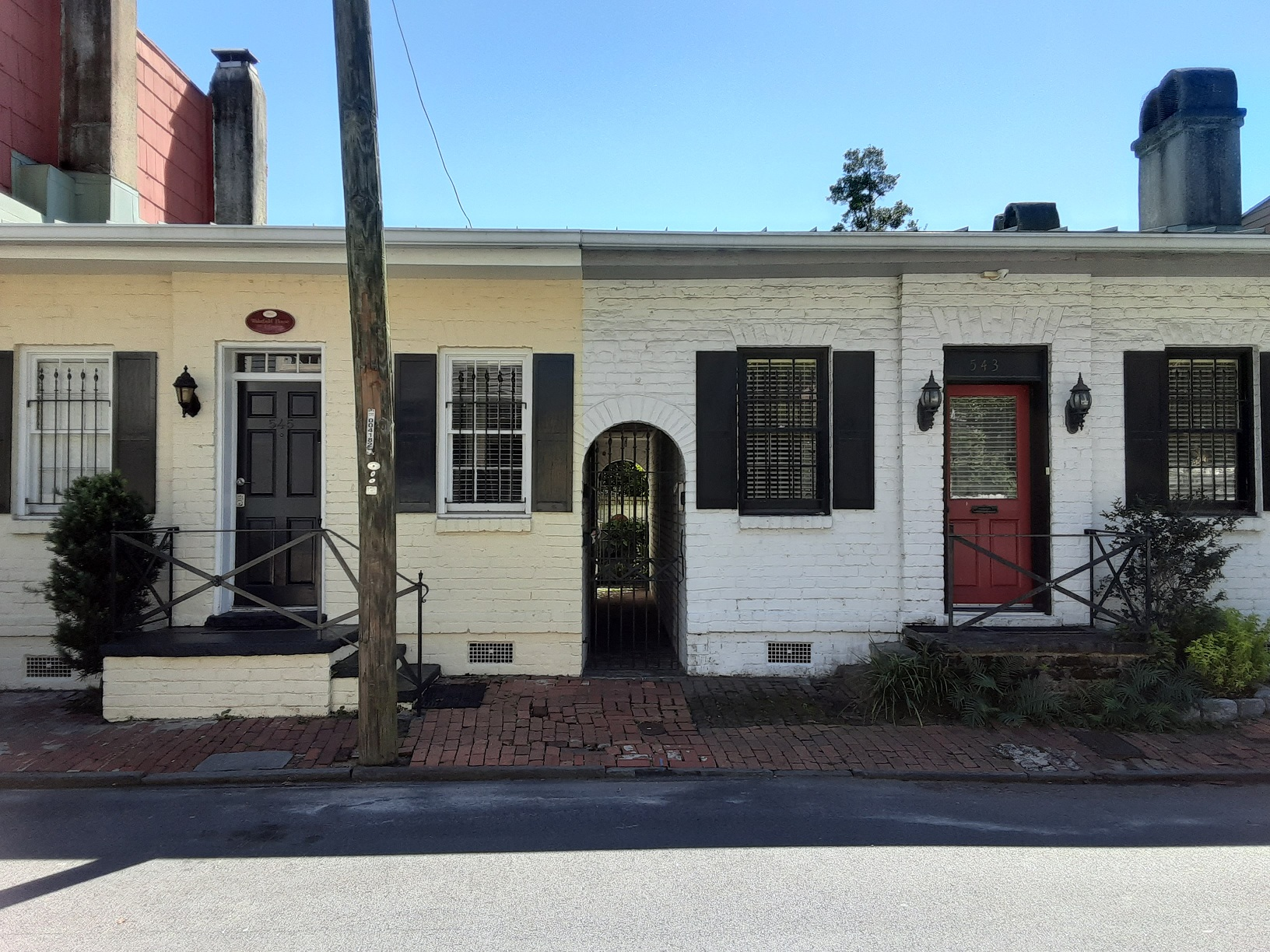
Two of three buildings at 541–545 East Congress Street that Williams restored in 1955, his first project in Savannah

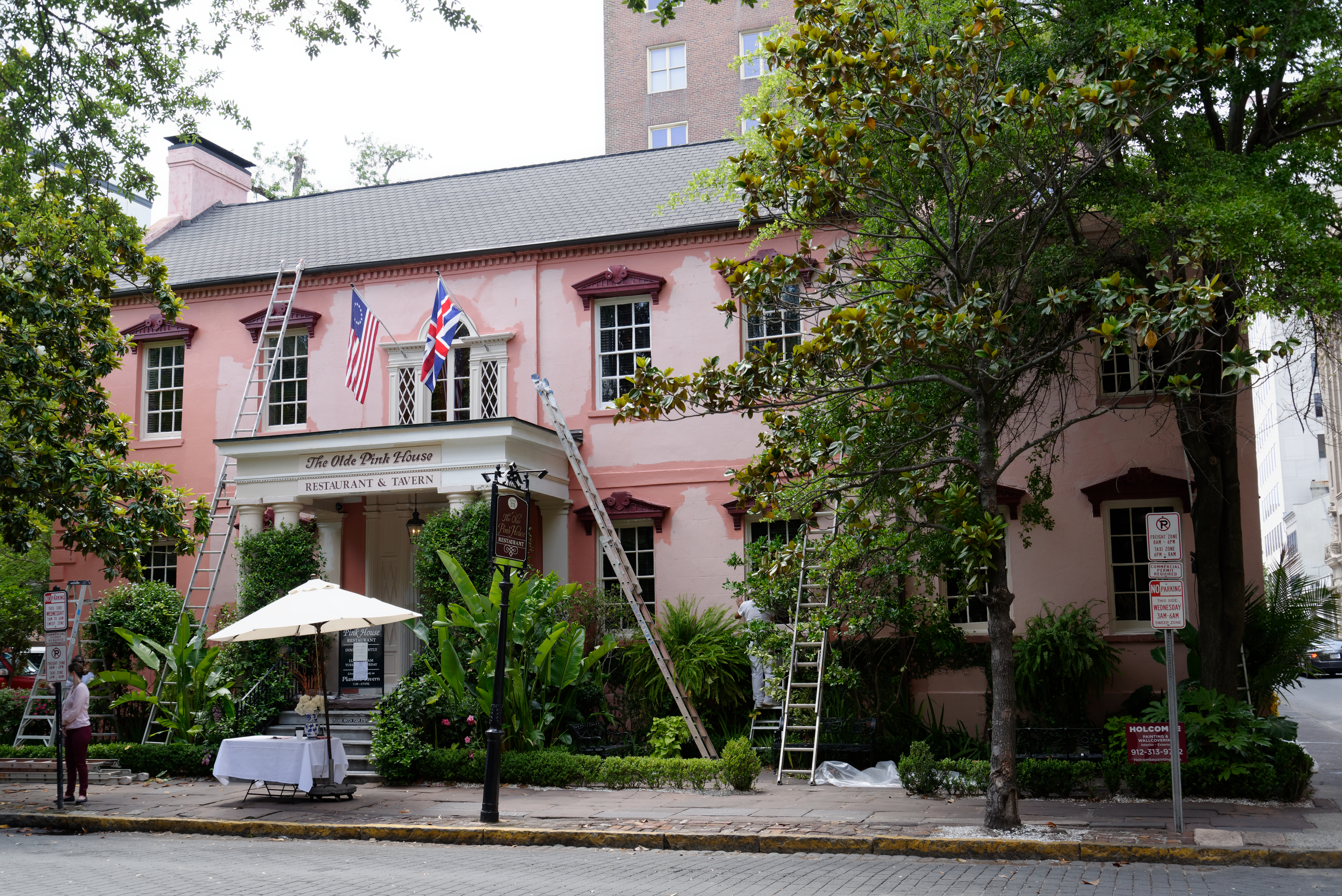
Williams also restored the Olde Pink House ...

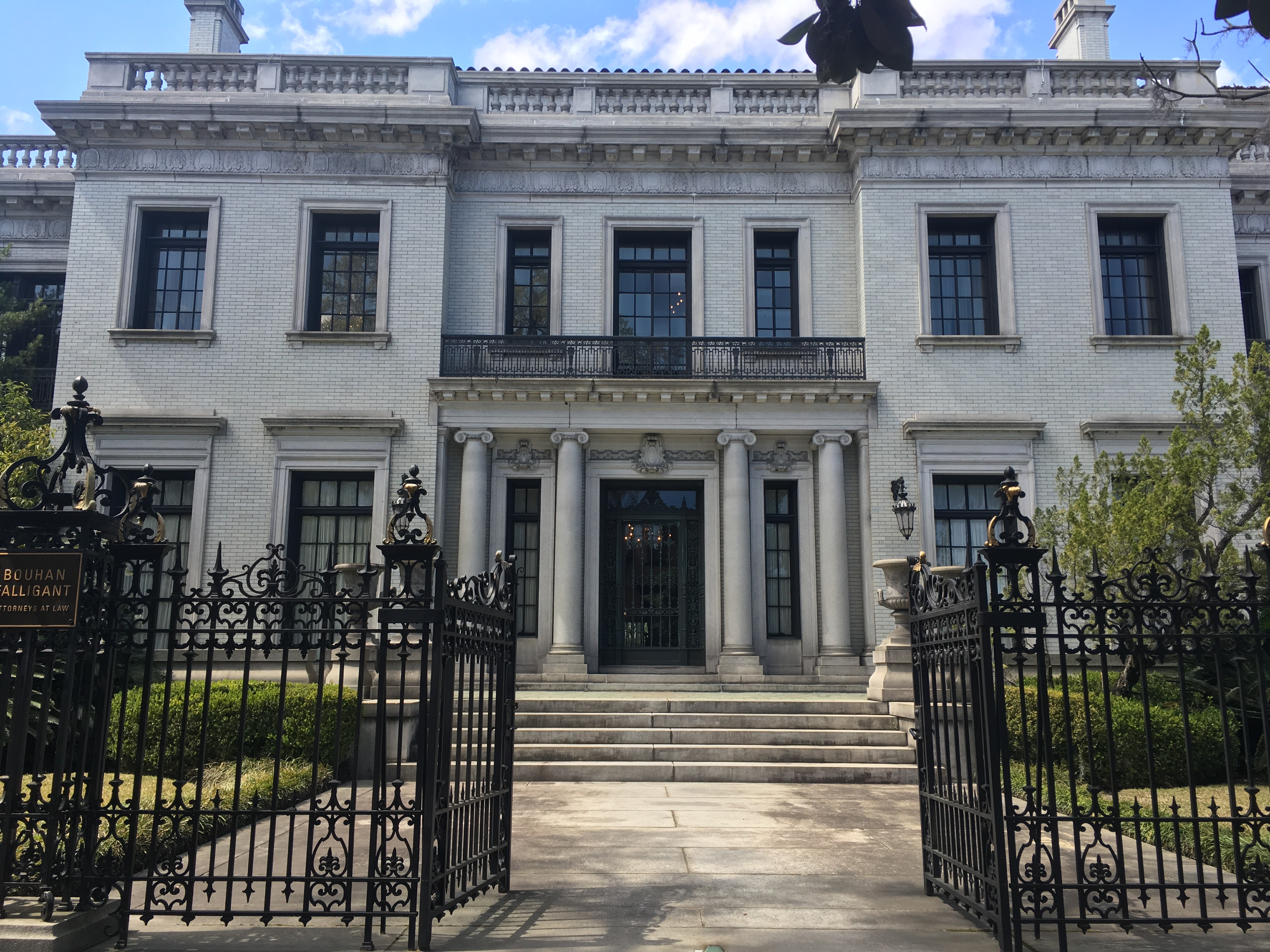
... and Armstrong House, formerly the law offices of his attorney Sonny Seiler

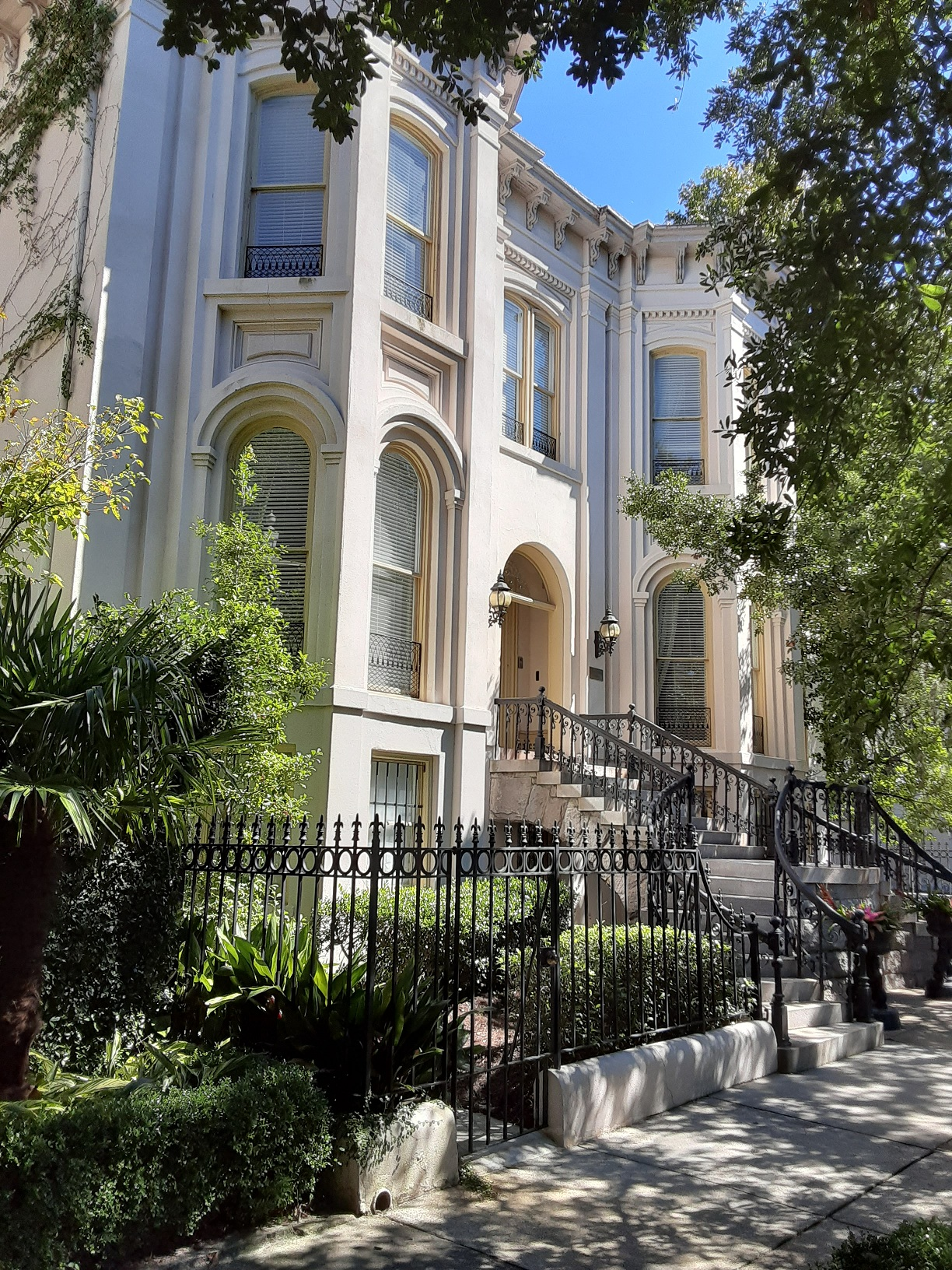
He was restoring 126 East Gaston Street at the time of his death

== Arrest and trials ==
Williams was arrested at his Mercer House home on May 2, 1981 for the alleged murder of 21-year-old Danny Hansford, with whom he had been having a homosexual relationship. At his arraignment his bond was set at $25,000, which he posted.

Williams claimed that he shot Hansford in self-defense. Prosecutors asserted that Williams had staged the crime scene to make it appear as if Hansford had actually fired a gun at him.

After four trials (the first three in Savannah; the final one in Augusta), a record in the state of Georgia, Williams was acquitted in May 1989, eight years after his arrest. Overall, he had spent 22 months in prison over the eight years.

== Death ==
On January 14, 1990, eight months after his acquittal, Williams died unexpectedly in his home, at age 59, from pneumonia and heart failure. He was discovered by Doug Seyle, one of Williams's employees, who let himself in after receiving no response at the front door Sonny Seiler, Williams's attorney, said he found Williams in the doorway between the office and the hallway: "I went immediately to Mercer House and found Jim on the floor. I thought he was probably dead. He was in his skivvies.”

Williams is buried next to his mother, who survived him by seven years, in Ramah Church Cemetery, Gordon, Georgia.

At the time of his death, Williams was restoring the mansion at 126 East Gaston Street, known today as Savannah College of Art and Design's Granite Hall, which he had purchased.

Williams's sister, Dorothy Kingery, inherited Mercer House and put it up for sale later that decade, with a price tag of just under $9,000,000. This was later reduced to about $7,000,000. Kingery died in 2023, aged 88. The Mercer House, now known as the Mercer Williams House Museum, continues to be owned by Dorothy Kingery's daughters, Susan Kingery and Amanda Kingery Heath, according to the museum's website.

== In popular culture ==
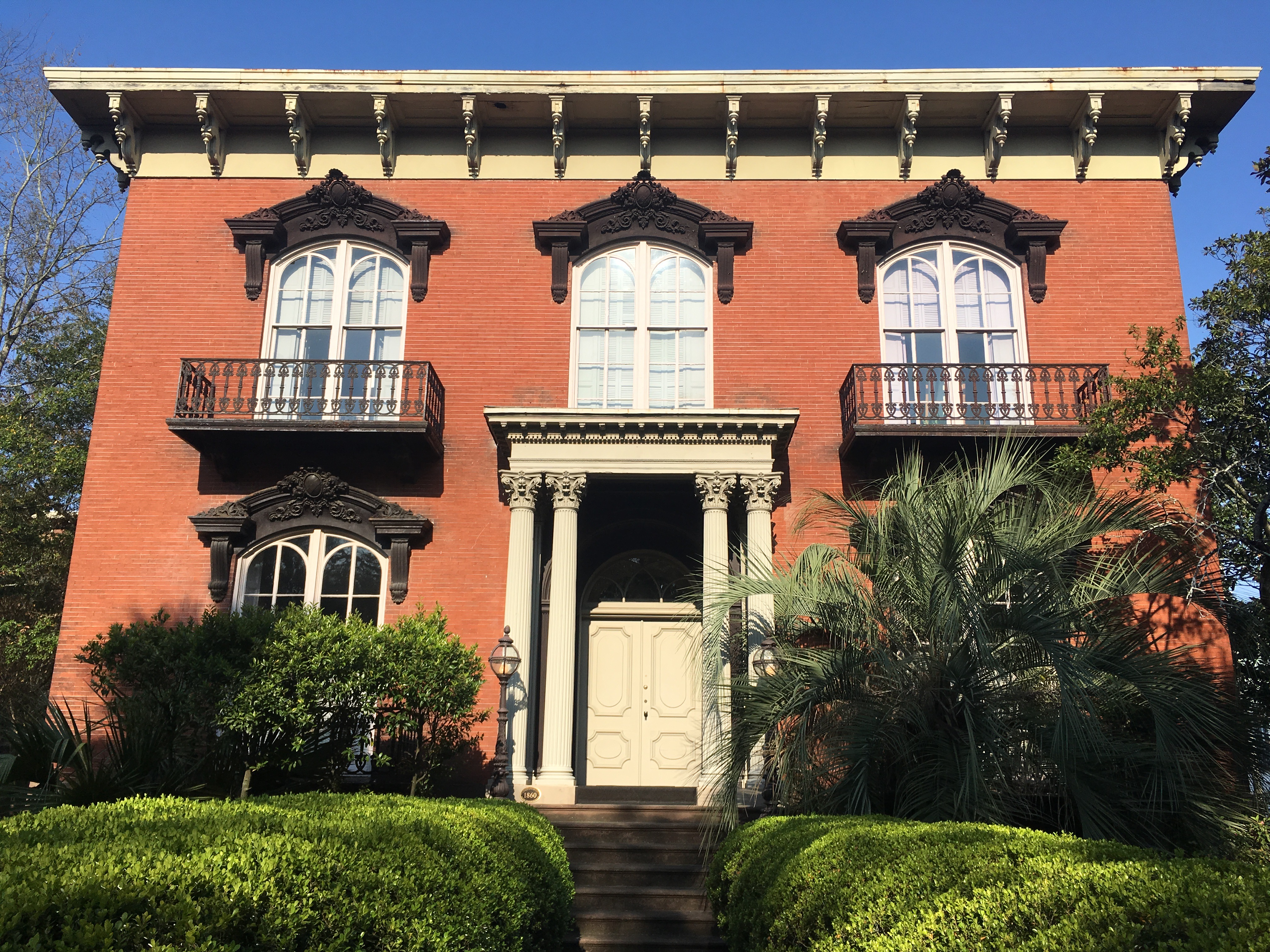
The historic Mercer House in Savannah, Georgia.

The book Midnight in the Garden of Good and Evil, about Hansford's alleged murder and Williams's subsequent trial for the killing, was written by author John Berendt and published in 1994. A New York Times Bestseller and finalist for the 1995 Pulitzer Prize in General Nonfiction, the book was adapted into a movie directed by Hollywood veteran Clint Eastwood in 1997. "Kevin Spacey played Jim Williams -- badly," Berendt said in a 2015 interview. "He didn't even come close. I had offered [Spacey] recordings so he could to listen to Jim Williams talking to me, regaling me with stories while sitting in his living room in Mercer House. [Spacey] said he'd already heard Williams on tape talking during one of his trials. But when I saw the movie, I was perplexed by the way Spacey portrayed Williams, because he did it as if he were asleep. He talked as if he were in a fog or sleepwalking. Then I realized what had happened, and I thought it was hilariously funny." Berendt believes Spacey listened to tapes of Williams during the third trial, when he had taken Valium.

Jim Williams's confession to John Berendt before the third trial was recorded on a Dictaphone by the author. "If [Williams] had not died, I don't know what I would have done, because I'm pretty sure he would not have wanted that in the book."

"I was fascinated by Jim, by what a brilliant and engaging storyteller he was," said Berendt in 2015. "He was bitter, funny, with that ironic humor so distinctive to Savannah."
