= Hampton Lillibridge House =

Historic house in Savannah, Georgia

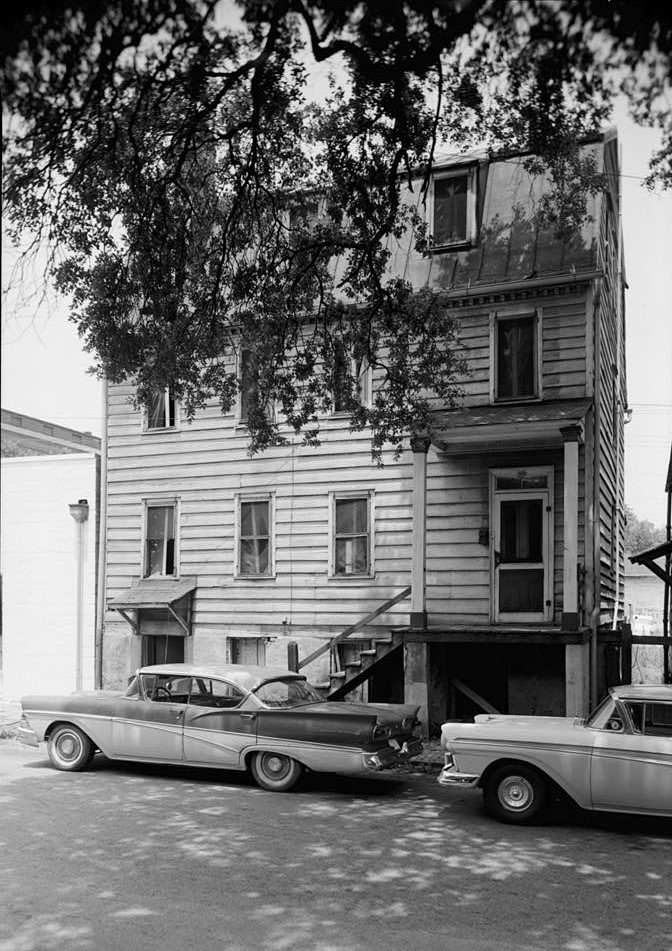
- The building in the mid-20th century at its original location at 310 East Bryan Street
- Interactive map of the Hampton Lillibridge House area

General information
- Location: Savannah, Georgia, U.S., 507 East St. Julian Street
- Coordinates: 32.0783034041°N 81.086084285°W
- Completed: circa 1797 (229 years ago)

Technical details
- Floor count: 4

The Hampton Lillibridge House is a historic home in Savannah, Georgia, United States. It is located at 507 East St. Julian Street, in the southwestern civic/trust lot of Washington Square, and was built around 1797. One of the oldest extant buildings in Savannah, it is now part of the Savannah Historic District. In a survey for the Historic Savannah Foundation, Mary Lane Morrison found the building, constructed by Rhode Island native Hampton Lillibridge, to be of significant status.

Lillibridge died at Shandy Hall, near Savannah, on February 14, 1801, after contracting yellow fever. His widowed second wife, Anna Orford, sold the house, at which point it became a boarding house.

It is one of Savannah's few clapboard houses to have survived the fire of 1820.

The home originally stood at 310 East Bryan Street, about 600 feet (180 m) away, in the northwestern residential lot of the adjacent Warren Square. The property was bought by James Arthur Williams in 1969. Believing the house to be haunted, Williams had it exorcised. He moved it to its current location and restored it.

== See also ==
- Buildings in Savannah Historic District
