= Capping ceremony =

Capping ceremony may refer to:

- In nursing schools, a ceremony where students receive nurse's caps
- In East Asian history, a coming of age ceremony
  - Guan Li in China
  - Genpuku in Japan
  - Gwallye in Korea

== See also ==
- Pinning ceremony (nursing)
- Ji Li (ceremony) for Chinese girls
- Stump-capping ceremony
