= Ji Li (ceremony) =

Traditional Chinese coming-of-age for women

- Traditional Chinese: 笄禮
- Simplified Chinese: 笄礼
- Literal meaning: Hairpin ceremony
Transcriptions

Ji Li (Chinese: 笄禮), also known as the hairpin ceremony, is the equivalent of the Guan Li; the Ji Li marks the transition from childhood to adulthood of a Chinese woman and involves the use of a ji (lit. '[Chinese] hairpin'). It is only after the Ji Li ceremony that a woman is considered an adult and is therefore eligible to be married. In ancient times, the Ji Li ceremony could be performed by people of any social class; however, rich people were more likely to hold the ceremony than poor people.

== Origins ==
Both the Guan Li, the capping ceremony for Chinese men, and the Ji Li ceremony appeared in China in ancient times, prior to the Qin era.

== Age ==
The Ji Li ceremony occurs when a girl is engaged or if she is getting married. However, it typically takes place when a young girl reaches the age of 15 even if the girl is not engaged or married. If the young girl was still not betrothed at the age of 20, the Ji Li ceremony had to be performed again.

== Procedures of Ji Li ceremony ==
The procedure of the Ji Li ceremony occurs through the following steps:

1. A married woman, typically one of the girl's relatives, combs the hair of the young woman,
2. The hair of the young woman is gathered up into a bun before being fastened with a ji (hairpin) which is typically inscribed with auspicious patterns.
3. She is then given an adult name.
4. The hairpin is later removed after the ceremony.

After the Ji Li ceremony, women had to learn how to be proper wives; this learning including the proper manner of speech and dress. They also had to learn needlework.

== Derivatives and influences ==
=== Korea ===
Korean women perform a coming-of-age ceremony that follows the Confucian tradition known as Gyerye (Korean: 계례; Hanja: 筓禮) where they would braid their hair and roll it up into a chignon before putting it in place with a binyeo (i.e., a hairpin) on their 15th birthday.

=== Vietnam ===
The tuổi cập kê (also known as the age of wearing hairpin) occurs when a girl reaches the age of 15. At the age of 15, the girl starts to wear a hairpin, and the hairpin becomes an inseparable aspect of a woman; as such, giving a hairpin to a man symbolizes that the woman trusts the man completely. It is based on a Chinese custom.

== Related content ==
- Guan Li – equivalent ceremony for male
- Chinese hairpin
- Hanfu

== See also ==
- Genpuku, the Japanese coming-of-age ceremony
- Cug Huê Hng, the Teochew coming-of-age ceremony
