= Korean ceremonial food =

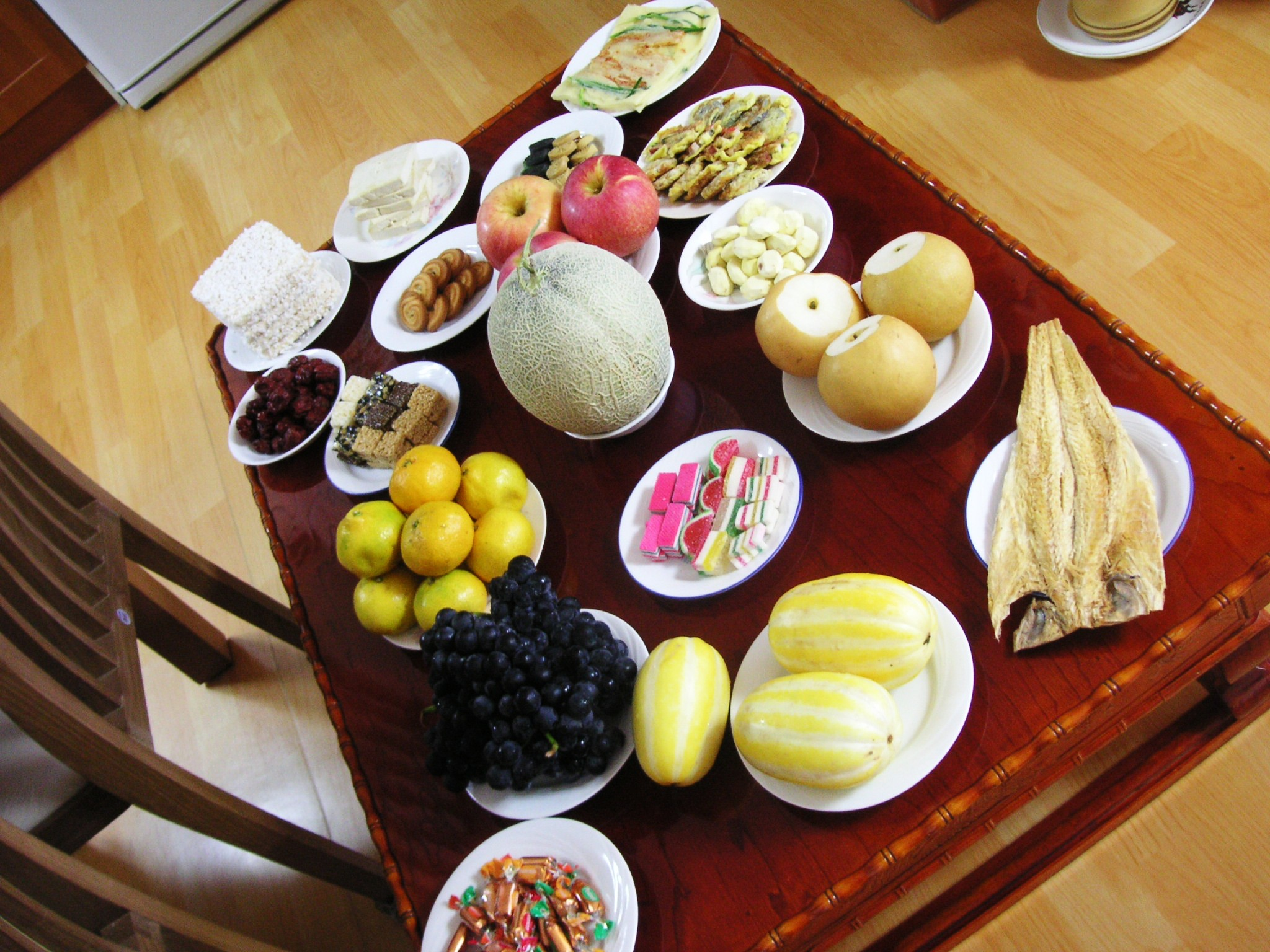
Ceremonial Chuseok Food

Traditions of Korean family ceremonies were mainly established during the Joseon dynasty (1392–1910), which adopted Confucianism as a state philosophy. As Korean society became Confucianized, the four family ceremonies of Confucian culture (coming-of-age ceremony, wedding, funeral, and ancestral rite; known collectively as 관혼상제; 冠婚喪祭; gwan hon sang je) have developed elaborately, and continue to influence Korean life to the present day. Ceremonial food was an important part of such cultural tradition and developed with variations across different regions and cultures.

== Childbirth ==
When a child is born, the family offers a samshin sang (삼신상; 三神床), a table consisting three bowls of rice and three bowls of miyeok guk (미역국; Korean sea mustard soup) to the three gods of childbirth (삼신; 三神; samshin), as three has been traditionally believed to be a fortunate number in Korea. The same food is also offered to the mother. Sea mustard, rich in iron and calcium, is considered beneficial for new mother's health.

== Baby's 100th day (baekil) ==
Baekil (백일; 百日), a baby's 100th day, is celebrated with a feast including rice, sea mustard soup, steamed white rice cakes (백설기; baekseolgi), and five-colored songpyeon with the family's friends and relatives. The rice cakes are distributed to neighbors. The white rice cake represents innocence, and the five-colored songpyeon harmony.

== First birthday (dol) ==
During dol (돌), the first birthday of a baby, the baby is elaborately dressed with a colorful outfit, and food including rice, sea mustard soup, steamed white rice cakes, five-colored songpyeon, steamed noodle, and jujube are prepared. Various objects such as a book, coins, raw rice, a bow and an arrow (for a boy), and a ruler (for a girl) are put on the celebration table. This is for a tradition of foretelling the baby's future by observing which object the baby touches first (a book for a scholar, coins for a rich person, etc.). The occasion is celebrated by family's friends and relatives, and rice cakes are distributed to neighbors.

== Coming-of-age ceremony (gwallye) ==
Gwallye (관례; 冠禮), the coming-of-age ceremony, is performed between the ages of 15 and 20. After the ceremony, a man begins to wear sangtu (상투; Korean topknot) and gat (a traditional hat) and a woman jjok (쪽; a traditional bun hairstyle) and binyeo (a traditional hairpin). The ceremonial food includes rice wine, rice cake, noodle soup, sikhye, and sujunggwa. Unlike other traditional ceremonies, gwallye is rarely performed in Korea these days as it has been incorporated into the wedding ceremony and the traditional hairstyle is no longer worn by most Koreans.

== Wedding ceremony (hollye) ==
In hollye (혼례; 婚禮), traditional Korean wedding ceremony, a table called daeryesang (대례상; 大禮床) is placed between the groom and the bride. The table setting varies according to regions, but usually consists of rice wine, rice cakes, chestnuts, jujubes, and other foods as well as a vase with a pine branch and a bamboo branch, a red candle, a blue candle, a live rooster and a hen wrapped in red and blue clothes. The color of blue represents groom, and red the bride; chestnuts and jujubes mean longevity and fertility, and pine and bamboo fidelity. The groom and the bride bows to each other and shares rice wine in a decorated gourd cup.

Foods prepared by the bride's family for the groom's parents are called pyebaek. Chestnuts and jujubes are offered to the groom's father, and pyeonpo (Korean steamed beef patty), yukpo (Korean beef jerky), and braised chicken to the mother. The groom's father also gives jujubes to his new daughter-in-law, which represent fertility. With other foods, noodle soup is usually served to wedding guests, which represents longevity.

== Funeral (sangrye) ==
In sangrye (상례; 喪禮), traditional Korean funeral, mourners stay up all night in the funeral hall. Alcoholic drinks, pork or beef head meat (머릿고기; meoritgogi), and yukgaejang are frequently served to them. The red chili pepper powder in yukgaejang is believed to protect guests from ghosts and spirits.

== Ancestral rite (jesa or jerye) ==
Jerye (제례; 祭禮) or jesa (제사; 祭祀), the Korean traditional rite for ancestors, is performed on Seol (Lunar New Year's Day), Chuseok (Korean harvest festival), and anniversaries of ancestors' deaths. Rules for table setting in ancestral rites are set in Confucian literature, but variations exist according to regions and clans. Some of the general rules are as follows.

- On the first row of the table, rice, rice wine, spoon and chopsticks are placed.
- On the second row, noodle soup, rice cakes, beef soup, chicken soup, and fish soup are placed. Rice cakes are placed on the eastern part of the table and noodle on the western part.
- On the third row, meat and fish dishes are placed. Fish is placed on the eastern part and meat on the western part.
- On the fourth row, kimchi (made without chili pepper) and vegetable dishes are placed. Kimchi is placed on the eastern part and other vegetables on the western part.
- On the fifth row, fruits (jujube, apples, pears, chestnuts, etc.) and sweets are placed. Red fruits are placed on the eastern part and white fruits on the western part.

=== Foods prohibited in rites ===
Foods traditionally believed to expel ghosts and spirits, such as red chili pepper, garlic and peaches, are prohibited in ancestral rites. Fish without scales which had been considered unclean and fish of whose names end with the syllable "chi" (치) – anchovy (멸치; myeolchi), mackerel pike (꽁치; kkongchi), and cutlassfish (갈치; galchi), which had been considered cheap – are also not placed on ritual tables.

=== Regional variations ===
Food for ritual ceremonies varies considerably between regions due to different cultures and availability of foods. For example, grilled shark has been uniquely offered in the ceremony in the Gyeongsang province and skate dishes in the Jeolla province.

== See also ==
- Korean cuisine
- List of Korean traditional festivals
- The Four Ceremonial Occasions
