= Chu Hua Yuan =

Coming of age ceremony in southern China

Chu Hua Yuan (Cug Hue Hng)
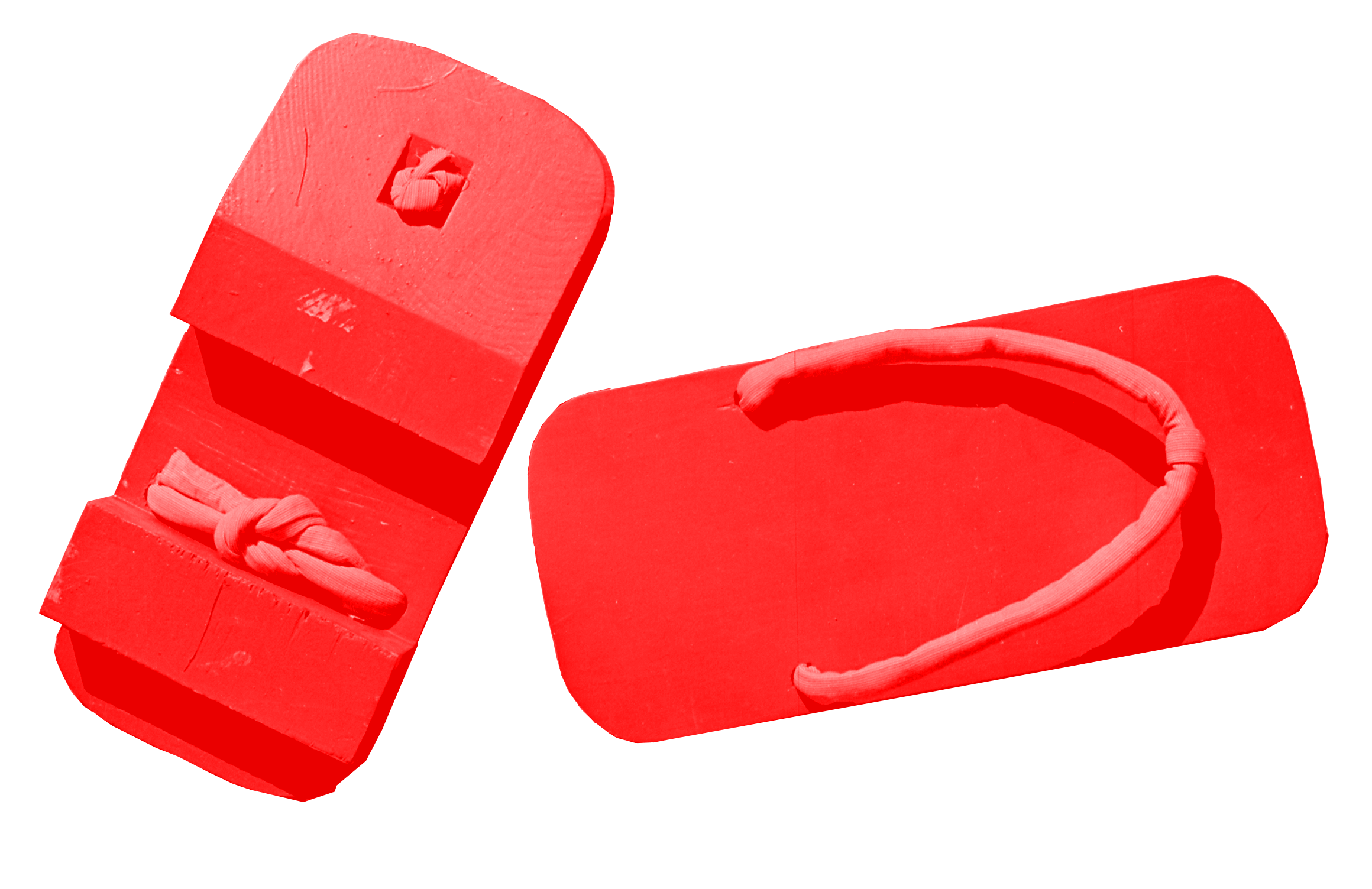
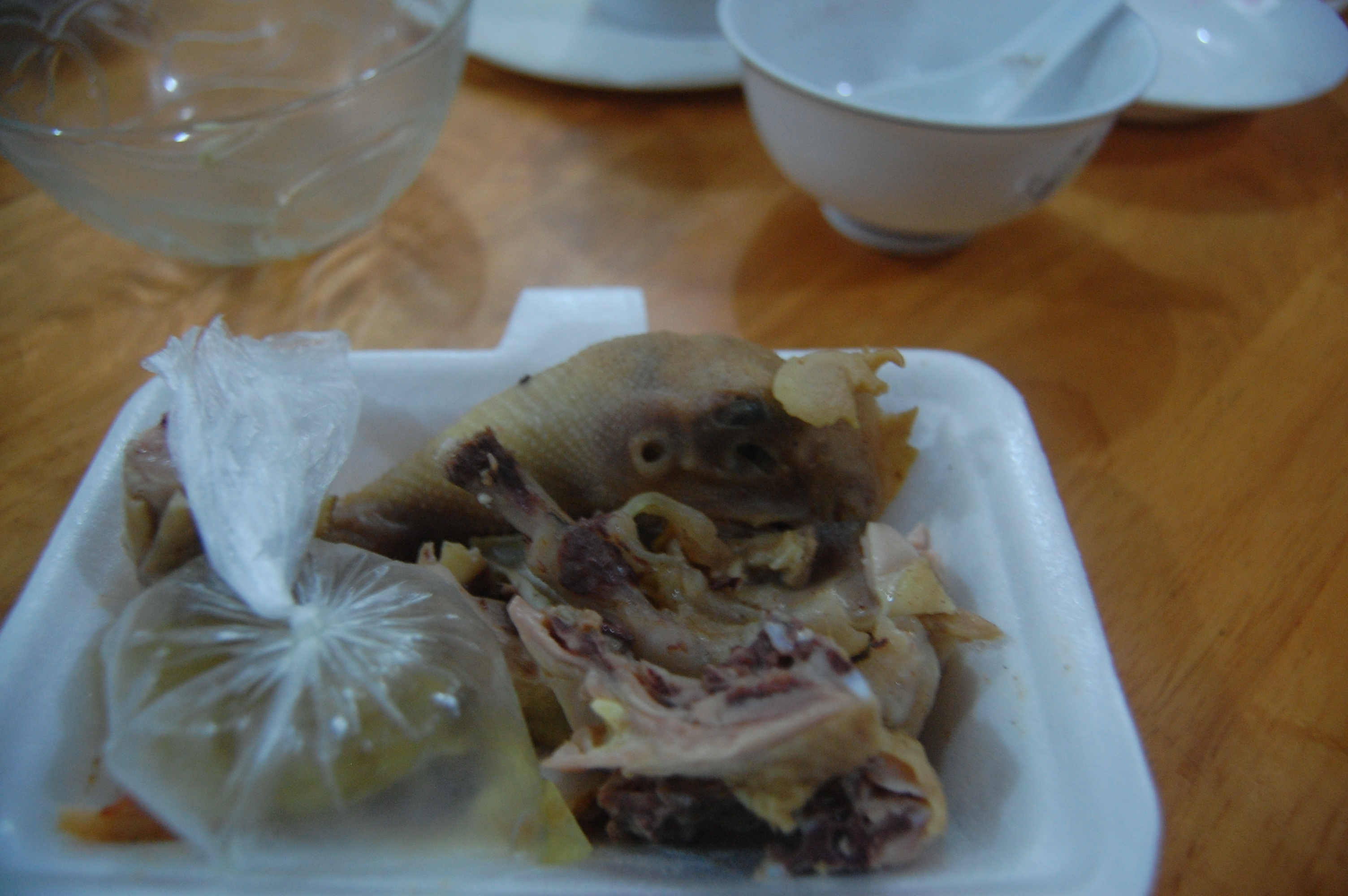
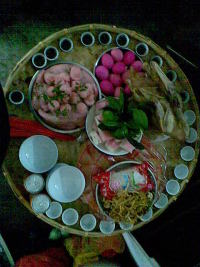
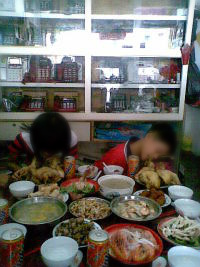
- Native name: 出花園 出花园
- Time: Teenagers in the 15th year of the nominal age
- Location: Chaoshan region and Teochew diaspora communities
- Type: Coming-of-age ceremony

Chu Hua Yuan (Chinese: 出花园; pinyin: Chū Huā Yuán) or Cug Huê Hng in Teochew, is the coming of age ceremony celebrated by Teochew people in the Teoswa (Chaoshan) region of southern China. It is practiced by both males and females when they reach their 15th year of the nominal age. The ceremony is usually held in the seventh day of the seventh lunar month, but some families may also choose another auspicious day usually in the third or fifth lunar month. The literal meaning of Chu Hua Yuan is "out of garden", which means that the children have grown up and no longer play only in the garden.

== Details of the Rite ==
=== The rite of worship ===
The day of "Chu Hua Yuan" has a rite of worship. What people worship in this special day is the deity of "Kong Pua Um" (Chinese: 公婆母; pinyin: Gōngpó mǔ), who is said to be the protective deity of children and in charge of children's lives and health. About the origin of "Kong Pua Um", there are several folk legends, among which the story about Song Renzong, the fourth emperor in the Song dynasty, is the most popular and widespread one.

It is said that after Song Renzong was born, he kept crying day and night, rejected eating, and thus became thinner and weaker day after day. Even the imperial physician could offer no help. A folk woman, who was very good at taking care of children, was thus recommended since all courtiers were worried about the situation. Under the good care of the woman, Song Renzong did recuperate, stop crying and regained his appetite. After hearing this news, the emperor Song Zhenzhong, Song Renzong's father, was delighted and decided to see Song Renzong. The woman was suckling the baby when she heard the coming of the emperor. Because of fear, the woman put down the baby in a hurry and hid under the bed. However, the woman died of panic and breathlessness. The emperor felt a great pity, and thus ordered an elaborate funeral for her and conferred on her the title of "the guardian angel of children", respectfully called her "A Pua (阿婆)". At the end of the Song dynasty, the descendants of A Pua settled in the Chaoshan area, retelling the story of their ancestor ever since. The story moved the Chaoshan women, who believed in deities and ghosts and thus decided to worship "A Pua". Without knowing A Pua's birthday, people therefore worshiped her in the seventh day of the seventh lunar month, which was the date when she died.

The purposes of the rite of Kong Pua Um worship are, on one hand, to express appreciation for protecting their children to grow up safe and sound, and on the other hand, to wish a smooth future for their children.

=== The rite of eating ===
In this special day, people will also have some particular conventions on eating.

On the morning of the day, parents will prepare a bowl of pig organs soup with sugar. The pork liver is one of the organs that must be included, whose "肝" pronounced the same as "官" (meaning "officer") in Teochew language. This is because the only way for ordinate people to get rid of poverty and oppression is to take the imperial competitive examination, a bureaucratic electoral system in ancient China, to become the imperial court officials. Eating sweet pig organs soup also means that you have renew your bowel, your belly and your body, giving up the immature and dirty things, and absorbing new knowledge.

At noon, parents will prepare a big lunch and invite relatives to join them. There must be eight or twelve persons sitting at each table. Usually, there must be twelve dishes on table, with scallion, leek and celery, which must be included. They all have some auspicious and luck meanings from their homophone. Scallion (葱) is a homophone for "cleverness" (聪) in Teochew, while leek (蒜) for (good at) reckoning (算), and celery (芹) for diligence (勤). The most important rite of eating is to eat the chicken head. The youngster who is partaking "Chu Hua Yuan" is seated at the front of the table with the chicken head towards him or her, while wearing a red pair of clogs. Actually, they may not really eat the head but take a single bite for the good meaning of the top. If the child was born in the Year of the Rooster, the chicken should be replaced by duck or goose.

=== Local differences ===
- In Chao'an District of Chaozhou and Chenghai District of Shantou: children who have their Chu Hua Yuan should use twelve different flower petals soaked in water and wash their body. After that, they should wear a new red dudou that their mothers made for them and put twelve longans and two copper coin in the dudou. Then they should wear new clothes and red clogs given by their grandmothers.
- In Raoping County (Chaozhou): Instead of flowers, the children in Raoping must use two branches of banyan, two branches of bamboo, two branches of peach, two branches of Zhuangyuan bamboo (状元竹), two pomegranate flowers and two grasses soaked in water and wash their body.

In some regions, there are even customs such as threading, wearing red or pure white underwears (Note: Varies by region. White means "innocence" (清清白白) and "clearness" (明明白白).) (must be boxer briefs, which means "平平安安"), and ear piercing.

== Historical origin ==
It is said that the rite of wearing red clogs and eating the chicken head originates from a Ming-dynasty Teochew Zhuangyuan scholar, Lin Daqin. When he was still in school, he could not afford a pair of red cloth shoes because his family was too poor. So, he wore red clogs. One day, he saw an old man holding a chicken with a red couplet beside him. The first line of the couplet said "The comb on the head of a cock (雄鸡头上髻)", while the second line of the couplet was blank. The old man promised that anyone who could match the couplet would get his cock. Lin Daqin stood for a while and responded "The beard behind the jaw of a ram (牝羊颔下须)". The old man was happy with the perfect couplet and sent Lin Daqin the cock. After arriving home, Lin's father slaughtered the cock and cooked it, and gave Lin the chicken head as award with the meaning of the top of the list. Afterwards, Lin Daqin did graduate to Zhuangyuan and became a household name. From then on, people in Chaozhou regarded it as a good omen, so parents bought their children red clogs when they started school, and gave the chicken head to their children on the day of Chu Hua Yuan.

== Modern time ==
With the development of economy and people's changing perceptions, the rites have changed to some extent. Some people may choose to give up the complex rites and only have big meals in some upscale restaurants or just at home, and give their children some presents. Also, the presents from their parents and relatives has changed from new clothes and shoes to mobile phones, iPad, computers, gold or silver jewelry, and so on. Although, however, the rites have changed, but the good meanings for the special ceremony of coming of age still remain.

== See also ==
- Seijin no Hi (成人の日), the Japanese coming-of-age ceremony
- Guan Li (冠禮), the Confucian coming of age ceremony
