= Guan Li =

Confucian coming of age ceremony

Chinese name
- Traditional Chinese: 冠禮
- Simplified Chinese: 冠礼
- Literal meaning: To put on a guan ritual
Transcriptions
Standard Mandarin
- Hanyu Pinyin: Guànlǐ

English name
- English: Capping ceremony

The Guan Li (simplified Chinese: 冠礼; traditional Chinese: 冠禮; pinyin: guànlǐ) is the Confucian coming of age ceremony. According to the Li Ji (lit. 'Book of Rites'), it is only after the coming of age ceremonies that young people could call themselves adults and could share social responsibilities. The name Guan Li refers to the ritual ceremony for men which involves the use of a guan, while the Ji Li (笄礼; 笄禮; jīlǐ) refers to the one for women and involves the use of a ji. Both the Guan Li and Ji Li have important symbolic meaning for the Han Chinese. Both of these ceremonies are key Confucian rites, and are part of the "four rites", along with marriage, mourning rites, and sacrificial rituals.

The Guan Li and the Ji Li ceremony can be performed by people of any social class; however, rich people were more likely to hold the ceremony than poor people. In the 17th century, these ceremonies were banned as the traditional chinese top knot was forcebly replaced by the Manchu Queue, but there has been a recent resurgence of interest, especially in those who are interested in Confucian traditions and hanfu. Since 2010, large Guan Li ceremonies have taken place each year at Wenmiao, in Taiyuan, Shanxi.

== History ==
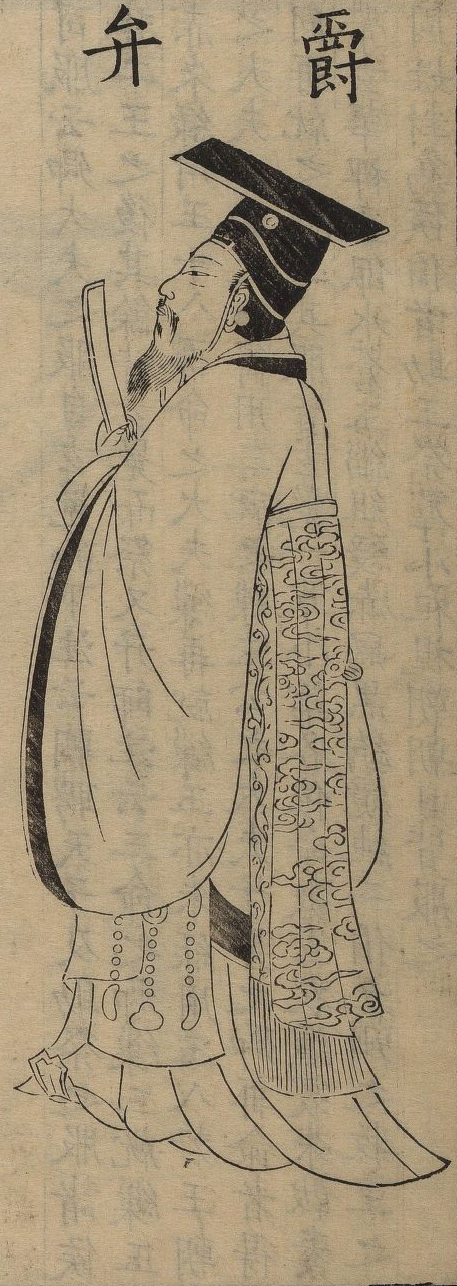
Juebian (爵弁) of the shidafu (士大夫) nobles, first worn during Guan Li and other rites such as marriage ceremonies.

The Guan Li and the Ji Li ceremony appeared in China in ancient times, prior to the Qin era. Some philosophical texts dating from the Zhou dynasty and Warring States period provide some evidence for the Guan Li ceremony, for example in the Analects of Confucius and by texts written by Mencius. The Guan Li ceremony can also be found in the Han Shu.

== Guan Li Ceremony ==
The Guan Li is also known as the "capping" ceremony. The character guān (冠) is sometimes translated as crown or cap. As a coming of age ceremony, the Guan Li ceremony marks the passage of man from childhood to adulthood. It is only after the Guan Li ceremony that a man is considered an adult and can be given adult responsibilities and rights; for example, a man could become the heir of his family, get married, inherit a business, and participate in other aspects of society.

== Age ==
The Guan Li ceremony typically occurs when a man reaches 20 years old and when a woman reaches 15.

== Location and organization of ceremony ==
The ceremony takes place in the young man's ancestral temple on a carefully chosen date, which was considered auspicious, and it was organized by a respectable senior relative of the young man. It could also be done by the eastern stairs (which was the entrance typically used by the master of the house) if the boy was a son by the proper wife, to symbolize that he was in the succession line.

On the day of the ceremony, many guests were invited, including the parents of the young man, the master of the ceremony, and an assistant.

== Procedures of Guan Li ceremony ==
The procedures of ceremony occur through the following steps:

1. Before the ceremony, the boy takes a bath; his hair is done and he then waits in a room.
2. At the beginning of the ceremony, the father of the boy gives a brief speech.
3. The boy comes out from the room and meets with the guests.
4. The father of the boy would hand him a cup, in the guest's place, without receiving one in return.
5. The senior relative, or the master of the ceremony, washes his hands.
6. The senior relative places three caps on head of the young man, as follows:
  1. The ceremony master washes his hand and places a futou on the boy's head; the boy then goes to another room to wear clothing with the same colour as the cap. After that he comes out and returns to the ceremony master.
  2. The ceremony master then gives him another cap; the boy goes back to the room and comes back wearing a dark coloured clothing which is worn by adult men to match the cap.
7. The young man gives a salute to all the guests and officially becomes a "man".
8. The young man would obtain a courtesy name.

== Derivatives and influences ==
=== Korea ===
Following the Confucian tradition, Koreans also performed the "capping" ceremony, known as Gwallye (Korean: 관례; Hanja: 冠禮) as a symbol of coming-of-age for men. On the day of the coming-of-age ceremony, Korean men would have their hair put up in a top knot and cover it with a hat (e.g. a gat) and were official given responsibilities as an adult men.

== Related content ==
- Ji Li (ceremony) – equivalent ceremony for women
- Guan (headwear)
- Hanfu

== See also ==
- Genpuku, the Japanese coming-of-age ceremony
- Cug Huê Hng, the Teochew coming-of-age ceremony
