= The Four Ceremonial Occasions =

Korean view of milestones in life

The Four Ceremonial Occasions (Korean: 관혼상제; Hanja: 冠婚喪祭; RR: Gwanhonsangje), with four rites of passage celebrated in this tradition, are the coming of age (Gwallye; 관례), marriage (Hollye; 혼례), death, or the funeral rites (Sangrye; 상례), and rites venerating the ancestors (Jerye; 제례). The word Gwanhonsangje an acronym, made of the first letter of each word (gwallye, hollye, sangrye, jerye).

== History ==
The word Gwanhonsangje (冠婚喪祭) was first used in the classic book Ye-gi (예기禮記), and has since been used in many other works describing various rites. Similar weddings and other practices have been observed since the period of the Three Kingdoms, although it is unclear whether the concept of a Confucian wedding ceremony was firmly established at that time. There are brief records of weddings and practices evoking the Chinese example, but the exact form this took is not clear.

=== Three Kingdoms ===
In Goguryeo (고구려) at one time, a man would work at the house of a married woman for a certain period.

Goguryeo had a custom of preparing funeral goods and conducting funeral rites to the accompaniment of music. Other customs established in the past included singing to mark the end of the period of mourning after death, and wearing mourning for three years.

In Silla (신라), it is surmised from records showing that partners bowed to each other, and held a feast after the ceremony that there was a ritual similar to the Confucian wedding.

According to the text 삼국지三國志 (the Records of the Three Kingdoms, 魏志 東夷傳), in this part of Korea at that time, there was a fixed period for the wearing of mourning dress and holding of funeral rites. Also in Silla (신라), burial on the burial grounds was banned for a period of five years during the reign of King Jijeung, when the mourning law was established.

In Baekje (백제), rites were similar to those observed in Goguryeo. Thus, during the Three Kingdoms period, the traditional wedding ceremony was similar to the Confucian rites.

=== Goryeo ===
In the early Goryeo period (고려), pictures from the Song dynasty relating to the Confucian rites were delivered to Goryeo. During the reign of Goryeo dynasty king Seongjong, the major institutions of the kingdom were reorganized according to the Confucian system, and Chinese Confucian rituals were imported at this time. It appears that Confucian-style practices were only followed by the upper class, with no systematic observance by the general population. The Confucian rites began to spread, with active acceptance of one of the Chinese texts on etiquette, 가례家禮, by officials of the later phase of the Goryeo dynasty.

=== Joseon ===
The Joseon dynasty (조선) adopted Neo-Confucianism as its ruling ideology, and the institution of Gwanhonsangje was established as a Confucian system. Various policies were implemented to establish the system of Confucian rites. As a result, books relating to etiquette (예서禮書) written in the Joseon style began to appear from the early 16th century. The government also made it mandatory for bureaucrats to sit a test on the ritual. Notably, codes concerning institutions and ceremonies were compiled during the Joseon era, and these institutions and ceremonies were made a part of the education system. In the 16th and 17th centuries, thanks to the academic work of scholars, the Korean stage-of-life rituals became generalized, under the name of Gwanhonsangje. More than 200 books were published; evidence of Joseon interest in the lifelong ceremony. Of note is the fact that the Gwanhonsangje ceremony of the Joseon dynasty did not simply follow the Chinese example, but rather adapted it to the Joseon context. After the Japanese Invasion of Korea in 1592, Gwanhonsangje became a universal rite of passage. At the end of the Joseon Dynasty, the arrival of Western culture saw the beginnings of change in the traditional ritual.

=== Japanese rule ===
In 1934, the Governor-General of Korea modified Gwanhonsangje, declaring a "rite rule" which forced the simplification of rituals in the name of modernization. This rule did not acknowledge Gwallye, only recognizing Hollye, Sangrye, and Jerye as formal ceremonies.

=== Today ===
The changes to daily life brought about by industrialization and urbanization led to societal acceptance of many changes to the rituals, including shorter funeral and mourning rites, and a reduction in the number of services. The wedding ceremony became an event and, accordingly, planned weddings grew in importance. Funeral directors emerged as a new profession, with funeral halls and funeral companies fulfilling the customary requirements. The advent of memorial service agencies gave rise to the memorial service. These new professional service providers take over the role of the individual in the practice of the rite, ensuring the smooth progress of proceedings even where the individual is inexperienced in the method or procedures of the rite. With these changes, various religious rituals are entering an era of diversity.

== The Four Ceremonial Occasions ==
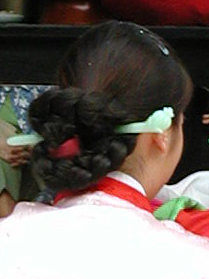
Korean hairpin - Binyeo

=== Gwallye ===
This practice is one of the ceremonies held in the East Asian countries that follow the Confucian cultural tradition (China, Korea, Vietnam, and Japan). It developed from the coming-of-age ceremony in which primitive societies recognized minors as adults. Gwallye celebrations are usually held for a man between the ages of 15 and 20, and a woman over the age of 15. Although the man or woman is still single, he or she is treated as an adult after the ceremony.

==== Traditional Gwallye ====
The meaning of coming of age is defined in the classic Asian book on manners, the YeSeo (예서): “to awaken responsibility as an adult, and its purpose is to make one perform one’s duties.”

Gwallye (관례; 冠禮) and Gyelye (계례; 筓禮) refer to the annual ritual, which is a coming of age ceremony (성년례) awakening a child's development to maturity and granting him or her responsibilities and duties as an adult.

To mark the Gwallye ceremony, a man, on reaching an age between 15 and 20, ties his hair in a topknot (상투) and puts on a crown.

In the Gyelye ritual, a woman who is over the age of 15 takes on an adult appearance by wearing a binyeo (비녀), or ornamental hairpin, along with other sorts of attire.

Today, the traditional Gwallye and Gyelye ceremonies have virtually disappeared, and are seldom performed. In the modern era, the third Monday of May is designated the 'Coming-of-Age Day', and on this occasion governments and organizations conduct annual 'Adult Day' events.

==== Modern coming of age ====
Until the mid-20th century, most traditional coming of age ceremonies took the form of inviting new adults to the homes or village when they reached the age of 20. With industrialization and urbanization, these traditional customs fell out of use. To counter the disappearance of this rite, instil pride in traditional culture and teach the social meaning of the traditional ceremony celebrating the transition to adulthood, a modern coming-of-age celebration model has been developed. From 1999, the Ministry of Culture and Tourism was the lead proponent of this model. Since 2014, the official ceremony has been organized by the Ministry of Gender Equality and Family. The civil law reform of 2013 lowered the age of majority from 20 to 19. When young people reach the age of 19, the relevant unit within the Ministry brings them together, and the president of each organization hosts a simple event. Today, the traditional coming of age celebration event is hosted by Sungkyunkwan University.

Other than the official ceremonies organized by the state, few special ceremonies held in the home to celebrate coming of age. The practice is to offer greetings or a gift to the person reaching adulthood. Generally, friends celebrate on Coming of Age Day with a gift of roses, perfumes, kisses, or according to each person's request. Roses symbolize ongoing passion and love, and at the traditional age of 20 (now 19), 20 roses were given to mark the person's age. Perfume symbolizes good memories, represented in the form of scents. Kissing symbolizes a responsible love, accompanying the attainment of maturity with adulthood.

==== Organizing body ====
The annual modern Coming of Age Day celebration was originally hosted by the Ministry of Culture and Tourism.

On September 6, 2006, this role was transferred to the National Youth Commission. The National Youth Commission was replaced by the Ministry of Health and Welfare in 2008, when the department was reorganized. In March, 2010, the department changed again.

From 2014, the agency was assigned to the Ministry of Gender Equality and Family.

=== Hollye ===
Hollye is the name for the Confucian wedding procedure. In earlier times, the age for marriage was 30 for men and 20 for women. In modern times, marriage has been permitted from age 15 for men and 14 for women (under some circumstances as young as 12). Today, people usually marry at 20 or later.

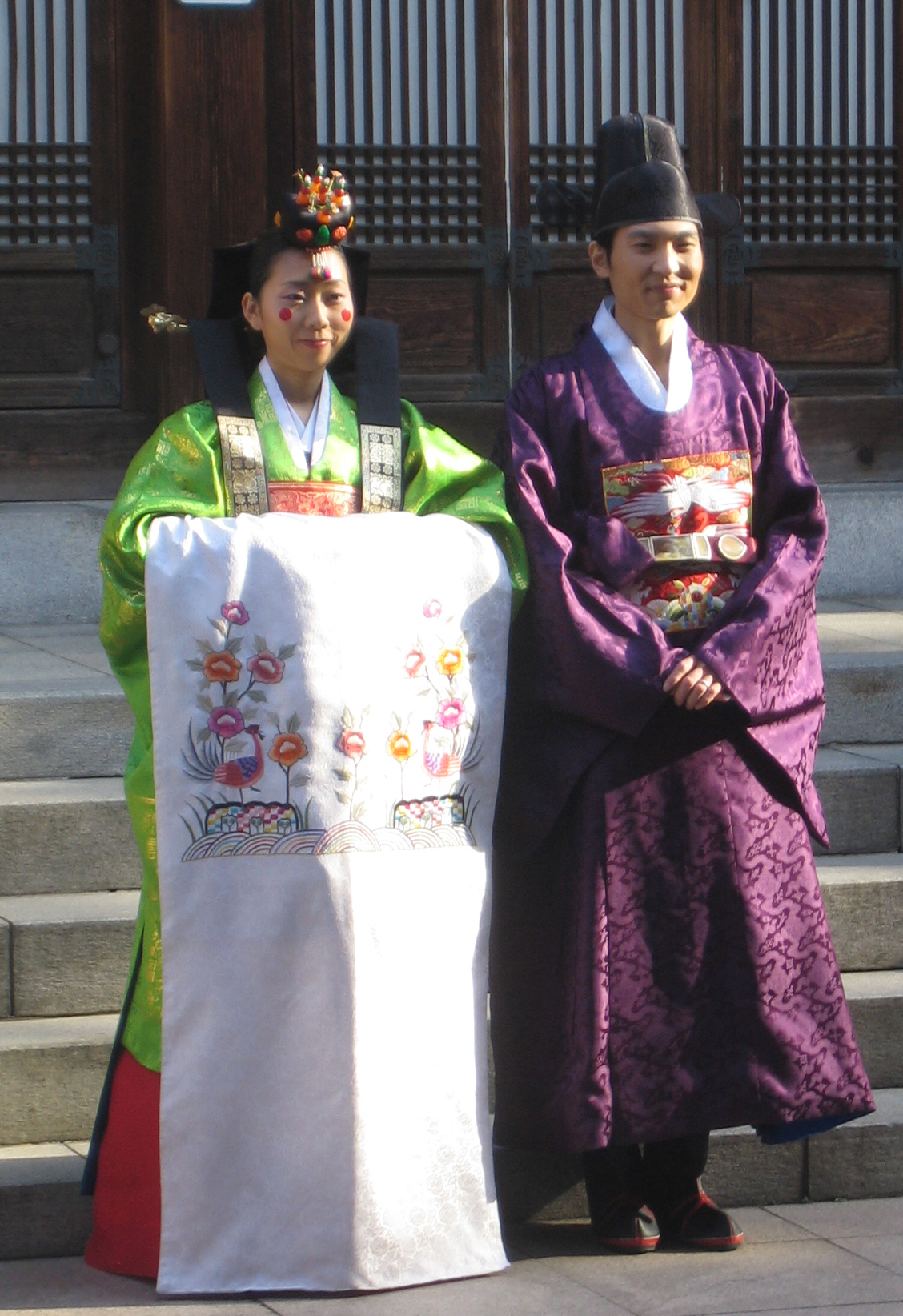
Korean wedding - Hollye

==== Traditional Wedding ====
Uihon (의혼; 議婚) is a ritual in which the families of the bride and the bridegroom consider the appearance, education and personality of the marriage partner. If the two parties reach agreement, they approve the marriage. This is called myeonyag (면약; 面約). In principle, marriage is agreed to by consent of both sets of parents. However, the wedding may only proceed if the couple do not share the same surname and family origin (동성동본), and provided that it will not take place during the one-year span of a mourning period. Nabchae (납채; 納采) is the term that designates the sending of a letter from the groom's house to the bride 's house, bearing the groom's saju (사주).

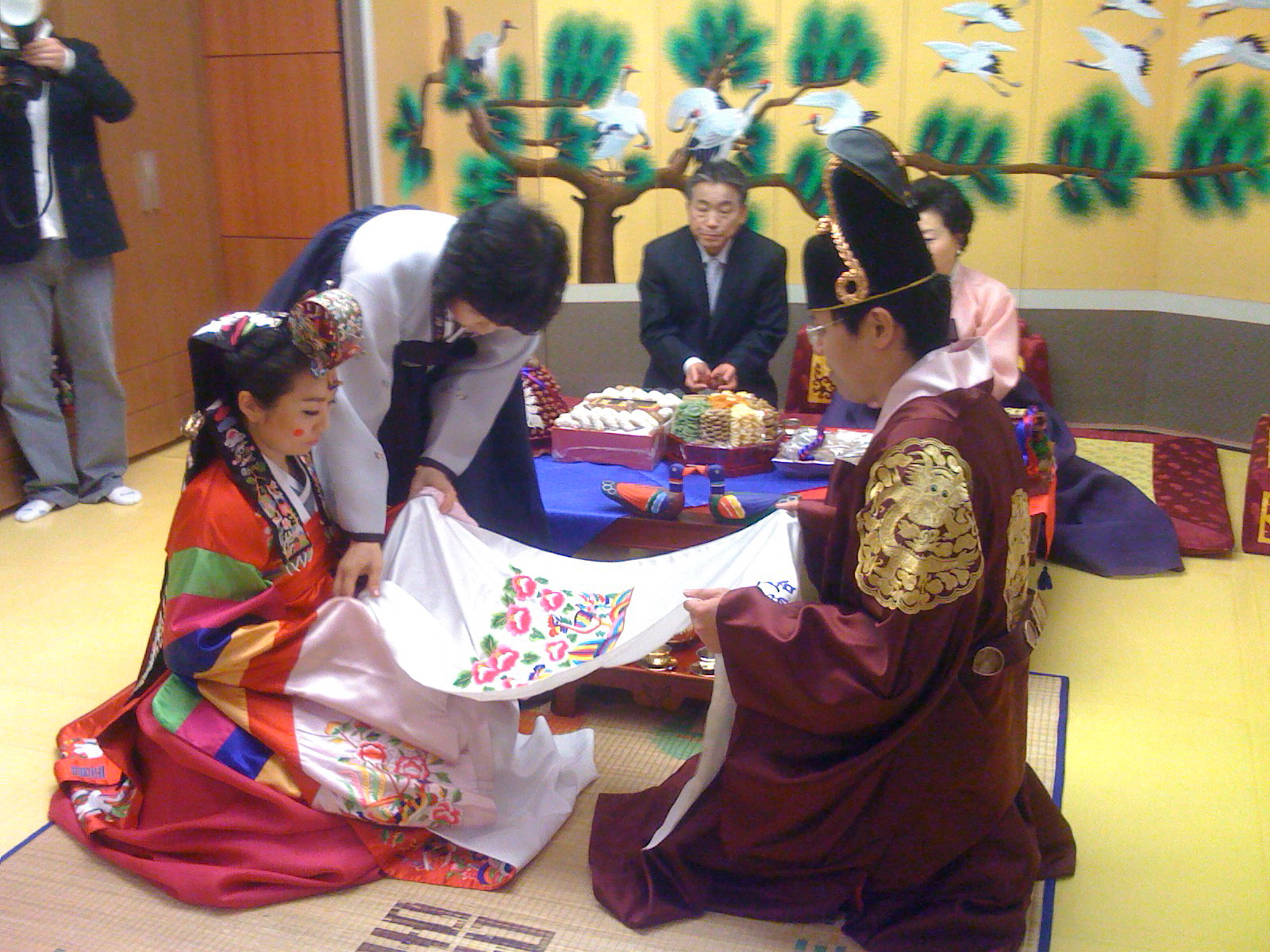
Korean wedding - Honrye-Pyebaek

Yanji (연길; 涓吉) refers to the setting of a wedding date by the bride's house, and its communication to the groom's house, in response to a letter of proposal, or saseong (사성), sent by the bridegroom. Nabpye (납폐; 納幣) designates the bridegroom sending a box called a ham (함) to the bride's house the day before the wedding ceremony, covering wedding expenses. The procedure of sending funds to the bride's house to cover wedding expenses, accompanied by a marriage letter in the ham, is an expression of gratitude for the approval of the marriage. Chinyeong (친영; 親迎) describes the bridegroom going to the bride's house, where the ceremony is held, and bringing the bride with him. This is the first ceremony in which a bridegroom is present in the bride's house. Jeonanlye (전안례; 奠雁禮) is a ritual in which the bride and her family greet the bridegroom and hold the wedding, daelye (대례). Cholye (초례; 醮禮) is the ritual in which the bride and groom meet for the first time and are united in wedlock.

==== Stages ====
The stages of the traditional marriage rites are as follows:

1. Saju-danja (사주단자; 四柱單子：柱單) ― When the marriage agreement is made, the groom sends the date of his birth on a blank sheet to the home of the bride-to-be.
2. Taek-il (택일; 擇日) ― In the woman's house, the wedding date is chosen, and is then sent to the groom's home. The method echoes the sending out of the Saju-danja.
3. Uiyang-danja (의양단자; 衣樣單子) ― The groom's house replies, sending the groom's clothes and shoe sizes and other details. Such details for the bride are generally sent included with the Taek-il danja.
4. Nabpye (납폐; 納幣) ― The day before the wedding, Seoga (서가) put Honseo (혼서; 婚書) and Chaedan (채단; 綵緞) at Ham (함; 函) and send this to the bride's home. The bride's family receives the Hamjinabi, opens the Hamand offers greetings.
5. Gosadang (고사당; 告祀堂) ― Following the engagement, and before the Nabpye, the syzygy day is chosen and the parties go to the Sadangto offer prayers for a perfect wedding.
6. Chorye (초례; 醮禮) ― The groom makes the necessary preparations for the wedding at the bride's home. This usually takes 3 days, but if the distance is not great, the day after performing Hyungugoryethe groom returns to the bride's home and spends 3 days.
7. Hyungugorye(현구고례; 見舅姑禮) ― This is the occasion at which the bride meets the groom's parents and their cousins. Then groom's parents respond by giving presents.
8. Hyehyeonrye (해현례; 解見禮) ― Usually called Sinburyeor Pulbogi, this is the process whereby the bride goes to the groom's home after the bridal chamber. The bride's family hosting the bride and groom is called Jaehang. Chinyoung is the procedure during which the groom greets the bride and brings her to his home for the wedding. Dongsangrye is the groom's stag party on the night of the wedding.

==== Gallery ====
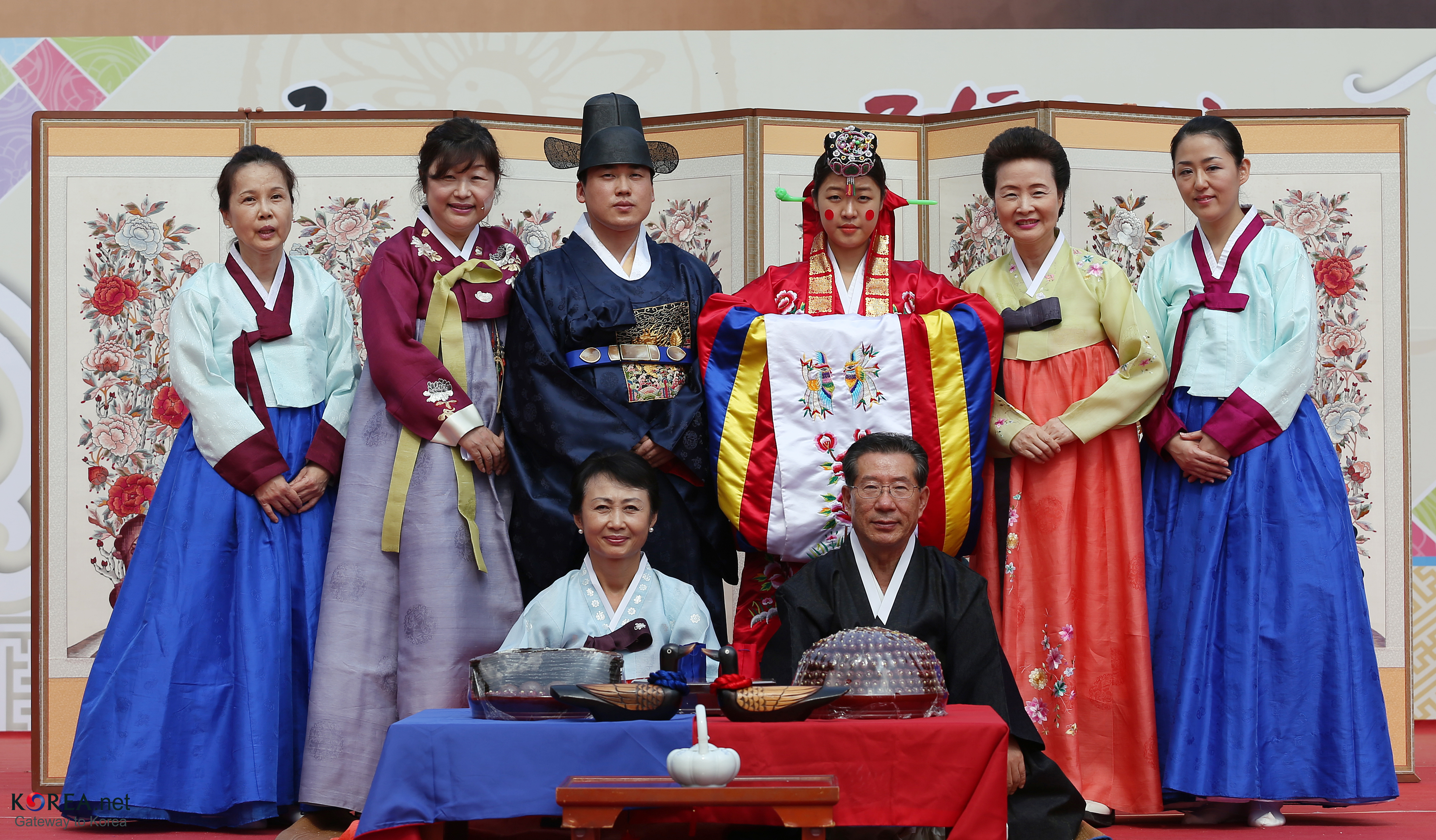
Korean traditional wedding

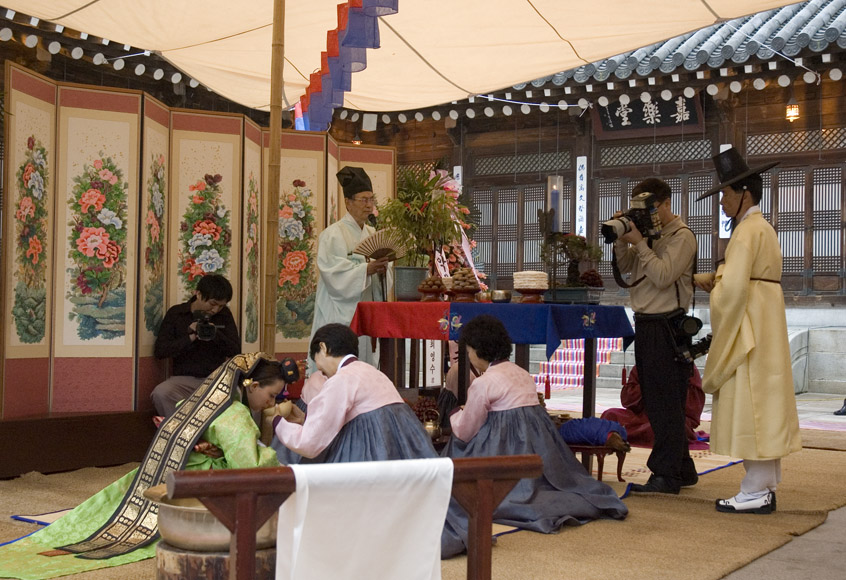
Korean traditional wedding

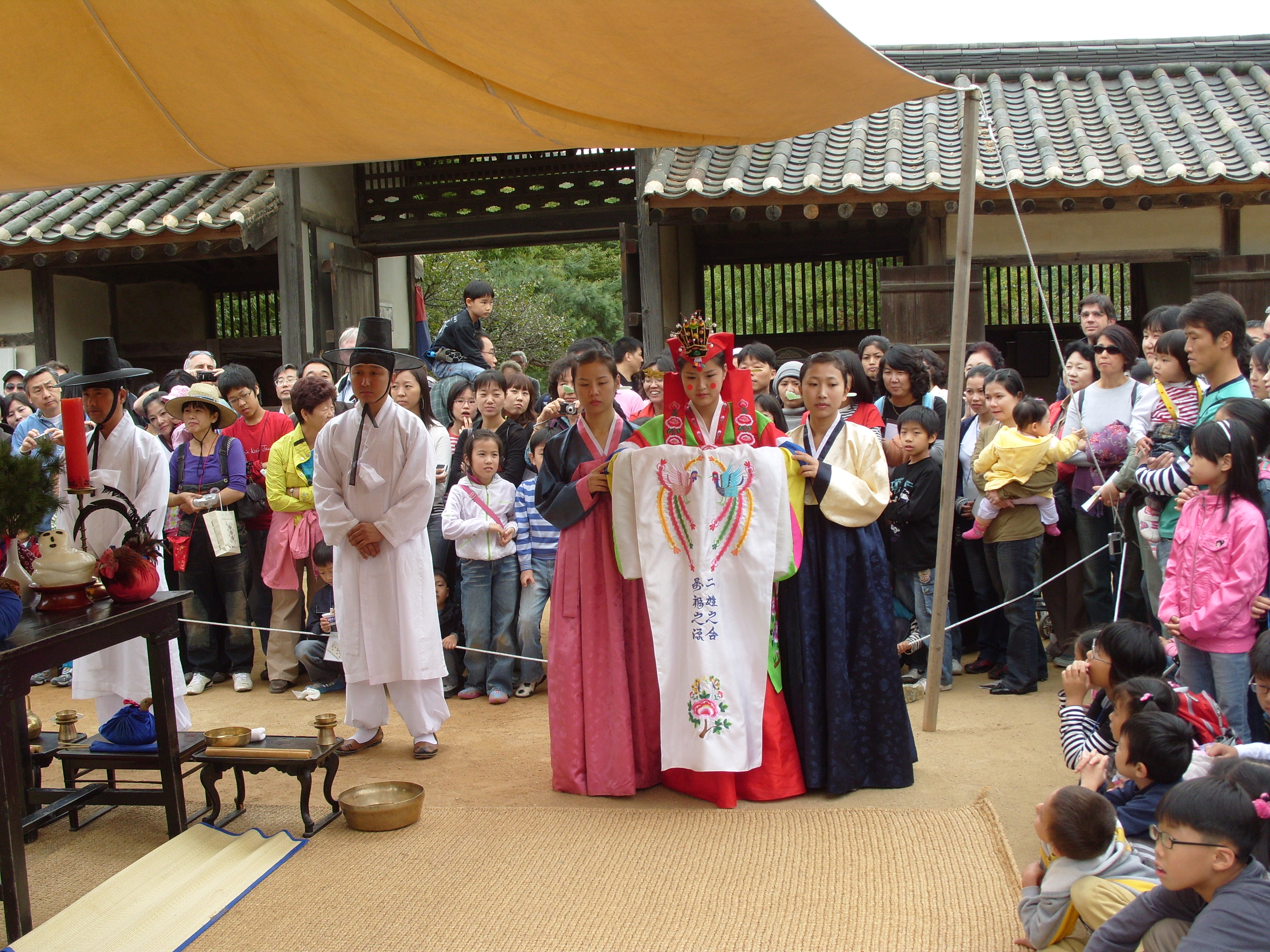
Korean traditional wedding ceremony

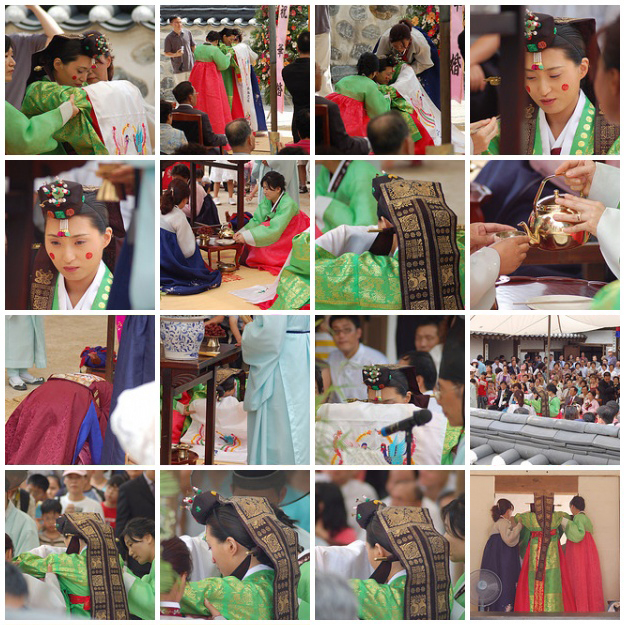
Korean traditional wedding ceremony

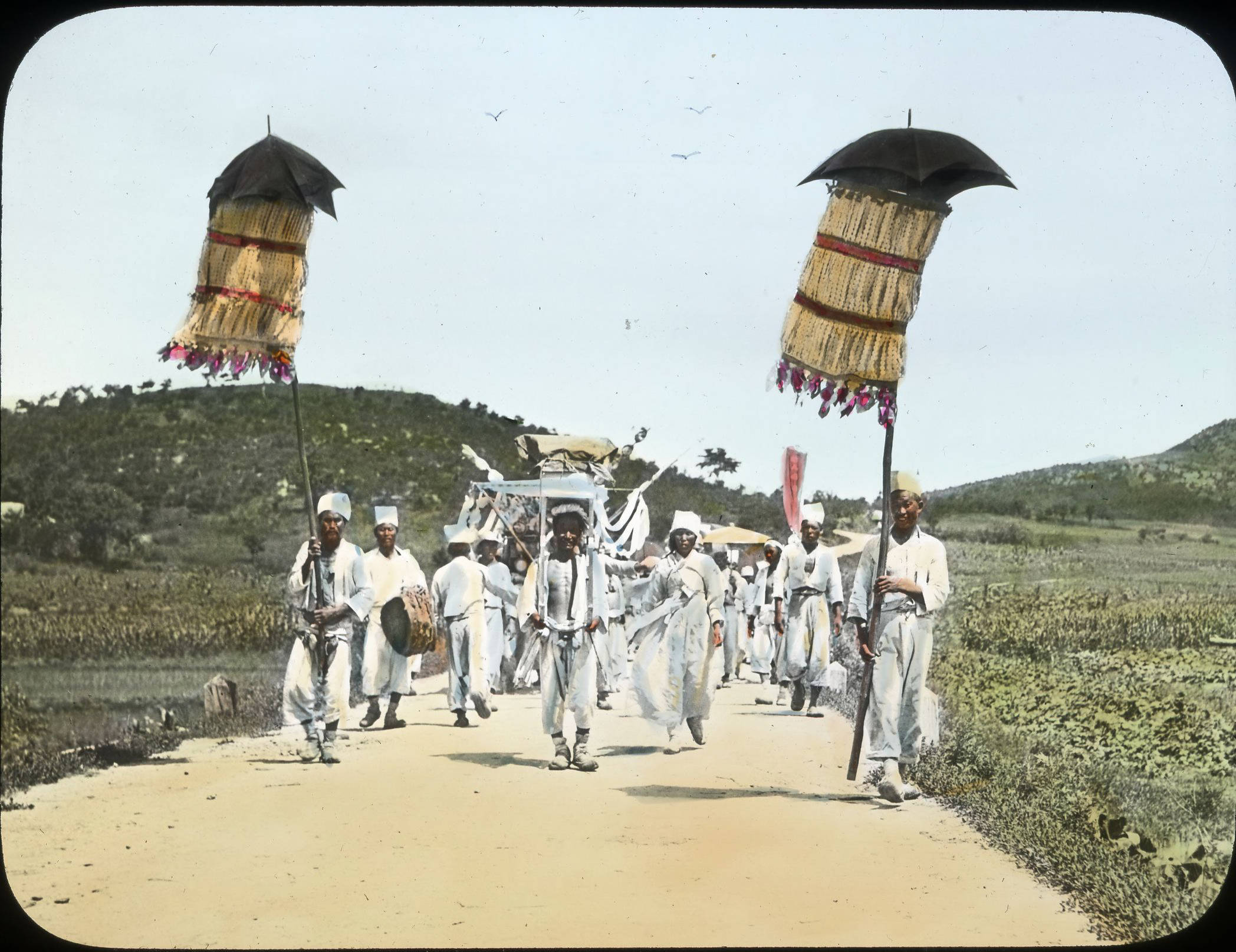
Korean traditional funeral

=== Sangrye ===
Sangrye (상례; 喪禮) is the name of the ceremony accompanying burial of a deceased person after their passage through the final gateway of death. Similar to the beliefs held in many societies, death is believed to be more than the ceasing of biological activity, and to involve the soul's transitioning from this world to another. These concepts are reflected in certain acts of the Sangrye ceremony, which can take many different forms in South Korean practice

Among conventionally practiced types of Sangrye ceremony are Shamanistic Sangrye, Buddhist Sangrye, Confucian-style Sangrye, and Christian Sangrye. These variants may also be combined. Today, Confucian-style Sangrye is more commonly practiced, and is considered the most traditional form.

=== Jerye ===
In early times, humans were in awe of the changes in nature, and believed that people would only survive and flourish if they acted in harmony with those natural changes, such as the cycle of the seasons. They also thought that all things were filled with spirit. Based on this understanding and conjecture, they began praying for human safety and wellbeing. Since those times, with the development of civilization, the ceremony has become more formalized, and this is also referred to in Confucianism as Jerye (제례).

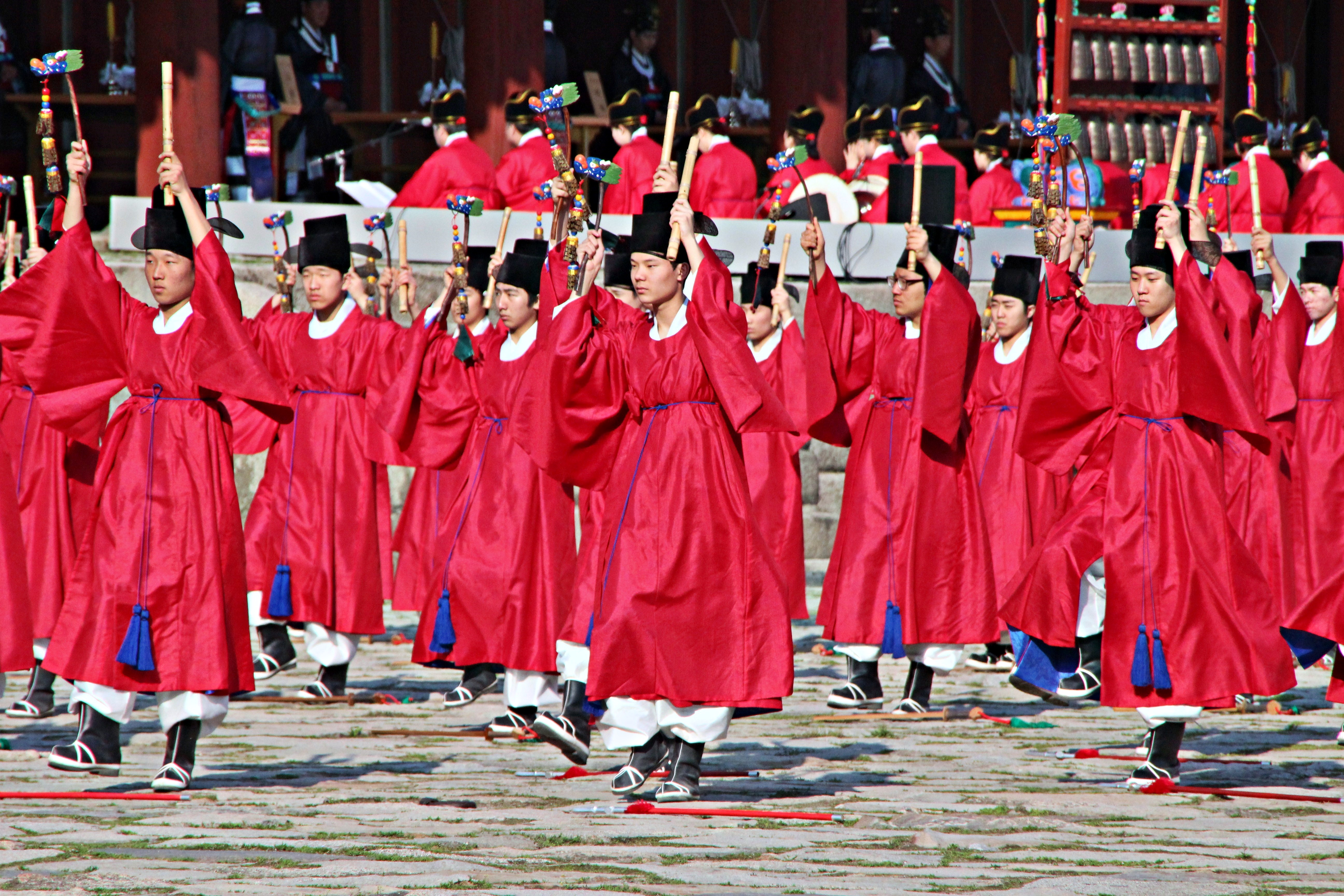
Korean Royal Ancestral Rite - Jongmyo Jerye

Jerye is a courtesy term covering the holding of many ancestral rites, and is a statement of etiquette concerning ancestor worship. Among the various kinds of Jerye are Gije, Seeje, and Myoje.

Jerye (祭禮) is an act of expressing sincerity by offering sacrifices of food to the spirit, the soul of the dead, and to demons, including the god. In East Asian culture with a Chinese influence, the ceremony for New Year, or Chuseok, is called Chalye (차례). In a narrow sense, it expresses devotion to the god in East Asian Chinese-influenced culture. In broad terms, it refers to all of the rituals involving the offering of sacrifice, relating to shamanism, ancestor worship, and animism.

The following foods are prohibited at a memorial ceremony and may not be served or placed on ritual tables:

- Peaches
- Fish such as the Pacific saury, hawk, and mackerel
- Red bean
- Foods containing pepper or garlic sauce

According to traditional belief and rules still applied, the ghosts hate red and garlic. There is also a rule that a man wearing a hanbok and making a sacrifice should wear full Korean dress (도포) and the traditional Korean overcoat (durumagi).

==== Ancient rules ====
The following rules originate in, or are derived from, an ancient Jerye event (제사와 관련된 사자성어):

- 홍동백서; 紅東白西) - Red fruits are placed to the east, white fruits to the west.
- 어동육서; 魚東肉西) - Fish is placed to the east, meat to the west.
- 조율이시; 棗栗梨枾) - Jujube, chestnut, pear, and persimmon are placed in order.
- 두동미서; 頭東尾西) - Fish should be aligned with the head facing east and the tail to the west.
- 사자반생; 死者反生) - The image of a dead person is placed opposite to a living person.
- 좌서우동; 左西右東) - The ancestral tablet should be placed on the east side, with its left side to the west and its right side to the east.
- 남좌여우; 男左女右) - Men bow on the left; women bow on the right.

==== Modern Ancestral Rites ====
Funerals typically take place over three days, with different rites performed on each day.

First day: on the day a person dies, the body is moved to a funeral hall. Clothes are prepared for the body, which is laid in repose in a chapel. Food is then prepared for the deceased. This takes the form of three bowls of rice and three kinds of Korean side dish. There must also be three coins, and three straw shoes. This step may be cancelled depending on the religion of the deceased's family's.

Second day: the funeral director washes the body and shrouding is done. A family member places uncooked rice in the mouth of the deceased person. (This step may not be performed, depending on the family's religion.) The body is then transferred into a coffin. Family members, including close relatives, wear mourning dress. Typically, mourning dress for a woman includes Korean traditional attire, or Hanbok, and for a man includes a suit. Clothing must be black. The ritual ceremony begins after the clothes have been changed and foods prepared for the deceased. Details of the ceremony differ according to the family's religion. After the ritual ceremony, family members greet the guests.

Third day: the family decides whether the body will be buried or cremated. If burial is chosen, three members of the family sprinkle dirt on the coffin three times. If the body is cremated, there are no specific actions to perform. The only requirement is an urn to hold the ashes and a place in which the urn will be kept.

People who come to the funeral bring condolence money. A food called Yukgaejang is served to guests, often accompanied with the Korean alcoholic beverage soju. Columnist Hwang gyo-ig has made the criticism that there are no seasonal foods in the current ceremony.

The current priesthood is not a tradition that has been handed down from the past, but rather dates from the Korean War. In addition, some Protestants and Muslims reject it as idol worship. In Catholicism, after the decision of Pius XII to accept communion, the priest makes sacrifice without new wine. This is often replaced, however, with a prayer. Buddhism is increasingly entrusting memorial services to temples.

== See also ==
- Korean traditional funeral
- Korean traditional costume - Hanbok
