= Coming of Age Day =

Public holiday in Japan

- Young women celebrating Coming of Age Day at Meiji Shrine in Tokyo, 2008
- Official name: Seijin no Hi (成人の日)
- Observed by: Japan
- Type: Public
- Significance: Congratulates and encourages all those who have reached the age of maturity (20 years old) over the past year and celebrates adulthood
- Date: Second Monday in January
- 2025 date: January 13
- 2026 date: January 12
- 2027 date: January 11
- 2028 date: January 10
- Frequency: annual

Young people, dressed up for Coming of Age Day, walk in front of a shrine just before twilight (2009)(video).

Coming of Age Day (成人の日, Seijin no Hi) is a public holiday in Japan held annually on the second Monday of January under the Happy Monday System. It is held in order to congratulate and encourage all those who have already reached the age of maturity between April 2 of the previous year and April 1 of the current year, and to help them realise that they have become adults. Festivities include coming of age ceremonies (成人式, seijin-shiki) held at local and prefectural offices, as well as after-parties among family and friends.

== Overview ==
On June 13, 2018, the age of maturity was lowered for the first time since it was established. According to the new law, which came into force in 2022, a citizen is considered an adult with the onset of full 18 years. Note that Coming of Age Day and the ceremony itself are not directly linked to changes in the legal status of young people. For example, adult status becomes effective on the 18th birthday, with some exceptions; both men and women can marry and are released from parental authority. At the same time, they are released from the various family and social restrictions imposed on minors. As adults, they become eligible for contracting on their own. As before, drinking and smoking are allowed at age 20, and the right to vote and to obtain a driver's license for passenger vehicles begins at age 18 (16 for motorcycles).

== History ==
Coming of age ceremonies have been celebrated in Japan since at least 714 CE, during the reign of Empress Genmei when a young prince donned new robes and a hairstyle to mark his passage into adulthood.

Rituals to celebrate adulthood have existed since ancient times, such as genpuku (changing to adult clothing) and fundoshi-iwai (loincloth celebration) for boys, and mogi (dressing up) and keppatsu (tying the hair up) for girls. Cultural anthropology and folklore studies treat such ceremonies as rites of passage (initiations).

=== Genpuku ===
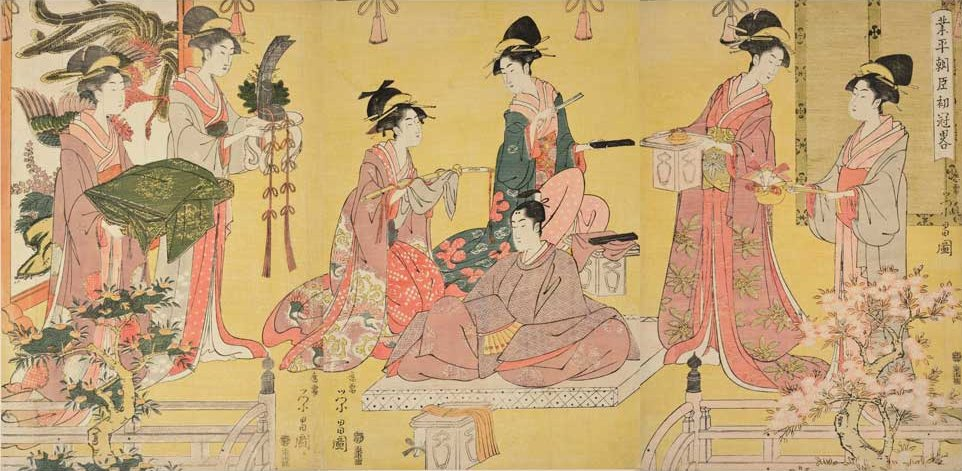
A late 18th-century parody of the genpuku (coming-of-age ceremony) of a minister, with most of the celebrants represented by courtesans

Genpuku (元服) is a Japanese coming-of-age ceremony which dates back to Japan's classical Nara period (710–794 AD).^{[1]} This ceremony marked the transition from child to adult status and the assumption of adult responsibilities. The age of participation varied throughout history and depended on factors such as sex, political climate, and social status. Most participants were aristocratic children between the ages of 10 and 20, and most descriptions of genpuku focus on the male ceremony rather than the female ceremony due to the exclusion of women from politically important court positions and warrior status. Important changes in clothing and hairstyle typically denoted this transition, for both men and women. Youth and children were often synonymous, and a period of adolescence was not often present throughout the periods in which traditional genpuku flourished. The etymology of the word, which is atypical, reflects the major points of genpuku ceremonial format; in this case gen (元) means 'head' and fuku (服) means 'wearing'. The ceremony is also known as kakan (加冠), uikōburi (初冠), kanrei (冠礼), shufuku (首服), and hatsu-motoyui (初元結).

==== General ceremonial format ====
Genpuku was traditionally considered a major rite, an important ritual affecting life course in which a child exchanged his childhood status for an adult status, and continues from the Nara (710–794 AD) into the Tokugawa period (1603–1868). The ceremony was usually backed by an older society member of political importance, and included the exchange of a childhood name for a new adult name (烏帽子名, eboshi-na), the adoption of adult hairstyles and clothing, and the assumption of adult responsibilities. Genpuku was undergone by both males and females, but was differentiated by ceremonial dress, with men receiving signifying headgear such as a ceremonial court cap (冠, kanmuri) or samurai helmet and women receiving, instead, a pleated skirt (裳着, mogi). The population, and members of the population, participating in genpuku depended largely upon both which historical time period the ceremony took place in and the kind of government that was in place at the time. Specific ceremonial formats are built around specific constructions of class, rank, and time period.

==== Child roles as preparation for adult roles ====
Since aristocratic children between the ages of 10 and 20 took part in genpuku in order to assume adult status and responsibilities, the role of the aristocratic child was to prepare for adult life. For both male and female children, studies in the Heian period began between ages three and four, usually under the supervision of a wet nurse and perhaps her husband. Children of these ages were taught about key court ceremonies, Buddhist doctrine, and proper ethics. At the age of seven they moved on to more formal learning, specifically studying the skills needed to navigate court life and to succeed in court positions. Skills included, but were by no means limited to, handwriting and calligraphy, and were mainly an education requirement for male children; however, the education of girls was important as well. The ultimate goal of children, whether they were male or female, was to successfully carry on their family's tradition and reputation. Proper education for girls was tied to successful or advantageous marriage, or their future ability to maintain a wealthy patron within the court.

==== Nara and Heian periods (710–1192) ====
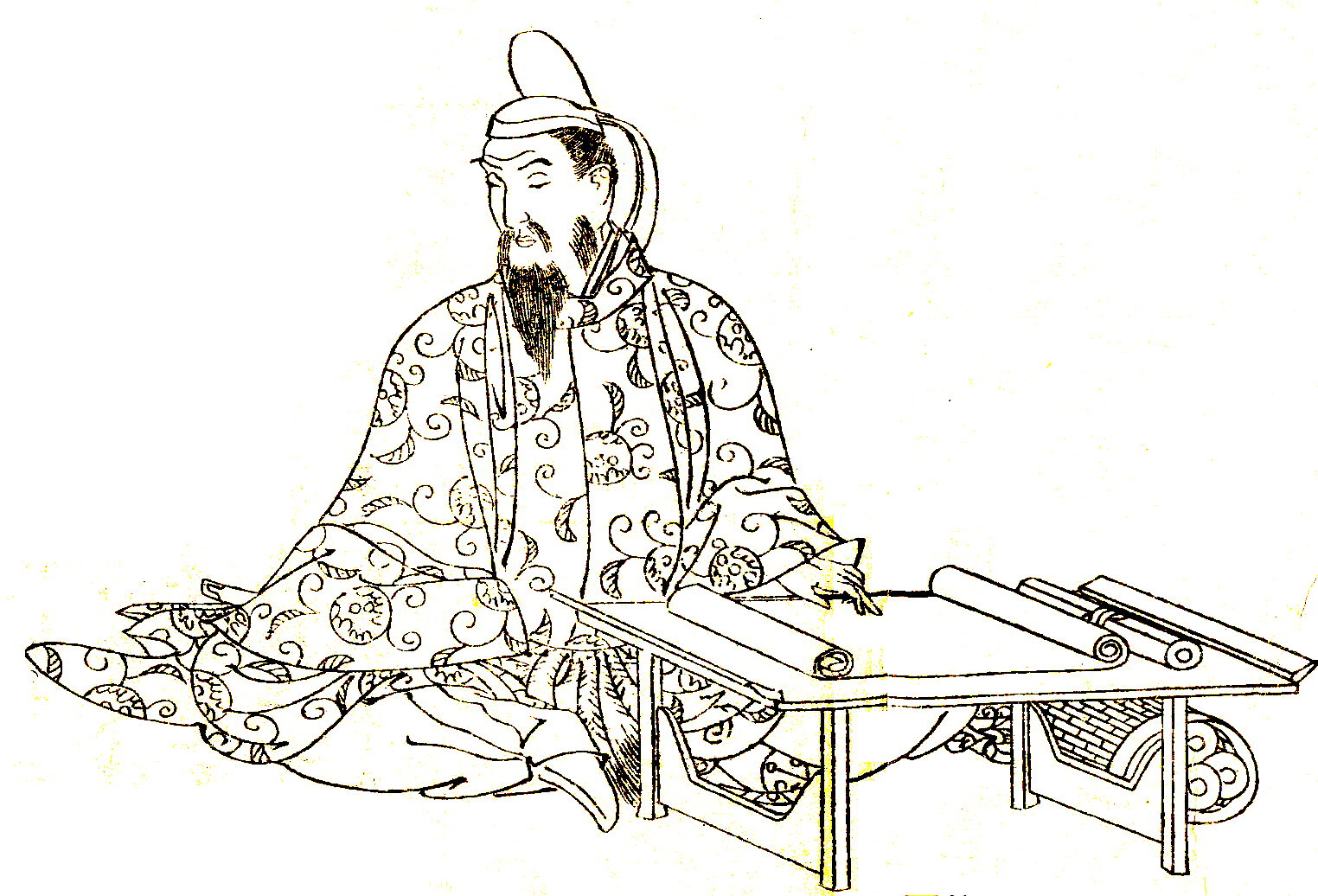
A politician and court noble during the Heian period seen wearing traditional court cap and garb

The earliest official record of genpuku in Japan dates back to the Nara period (710–794 AD), and the ceremony itself is based on an earlier Chinese custom in the Tang dynasty. Beyond the Nara, the ceremony flourished throughout the aristocratic Heian period (794–1185 AD), the last classical period in which Japan was governed by an aristocratic court. Children during Heian were not recognized as officially gendered before genpuku, and were said to have remained near the gods as "children of the kami". As children of the gods, those who had not undergone genpuku were often seen as youthful mediums and were some of the primary performers of ritual exorcisms. In addition, clothing and attire of childhood were ungendered and it was not uncommon for male children to wear makeup often as wakashū. In the period between early childhood and genpuku, boys were classified as wakashū.

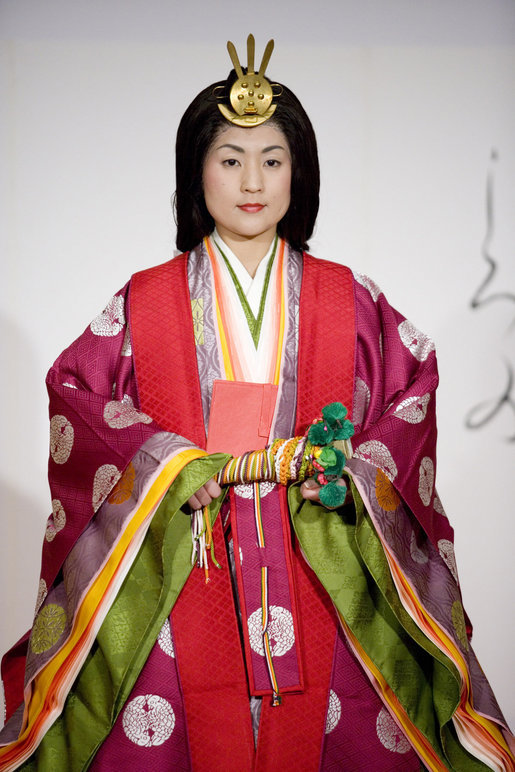
A young woman models a jūnihitoe, a 12-layered formal court dress worn by women during the Heian period, during a demonstration of traditional Japanese culture

During these periods, primarily male members of the aristocracy between the ages of seven and fifteen engaged in genpuku. The ceremony was generally a precursor to obtaining court cap and rank. Parents chose when to hold their children's genpuku based on a number of factors, including the arrival of a suitable opportunity, the child's readiness for court service, the presence of one or more influential court backers, and the parents' ability to finance the ceremony.

Once it was deemed an appropriate time for a child to undergo genpuku, a variety of preparations were made for the upcoming ceremony. The child had to acquire a "capping parent", usually a person of influence, who would help the child don the ritual clothing of adulthood, most significantly a ceremonial court hat (kanmuri). Both the capping parent and the biological parents made preparations for the ceremony, but the capping parent was more active in making arrangements.

The genpuku ceremony itself almost always took place in the evening on a predetermined "auspicious day", either at the residence of a kakan (dignitary) or at the Shishinden (Kyoto Imperial Palace). When the capping ceremony was held for the son of a Counselor or Consultant, the capping parent was most often a kakan and the ceremony took place at the kakan's residence. When the ceremony was held for an Emperor or Crown prince, the current Emperor would sometimes cap the initiate within the Shishinden. The capping parent was joined by another important ceremonial participant, either the Nokan (if an Emperor was undergoing the ceremony) or a Rihatsu, who "loosened the childhood coiffure, cut the ends of the hair, bound the head with a fillet, and otherwise prepared the boy to receive the cap". After the capping, the child retreated to a private room to exchange his ungendered wide-sleeved childhood robes for adult male robes. The transition from child to adult was complete, and feasting followed closely thereafter. Genpuku and adult status were accompanied by marriage eligibility, gendering, a removal from the male "erotic gaze" within court, the abandon of makeup use for males, and the opportunity to obtain court rank.

Girls engaged in genpuku as well, although the particular ceremonial rituals were more commonly referred to as mogi. For women, as for men, the ceremony revolved around the presentation of adult clothing; however, women were presented with a pleated skirt, not a court cap. Girls participating in mogi coming-of-age ceremonies traditionally blackened their teeth, shaved their eyebrows, and applied makeup. In addition, their long unbound hair was tied on top of their head in an adult hairstyle.

==== Age of the samurai (1185–1868) ====
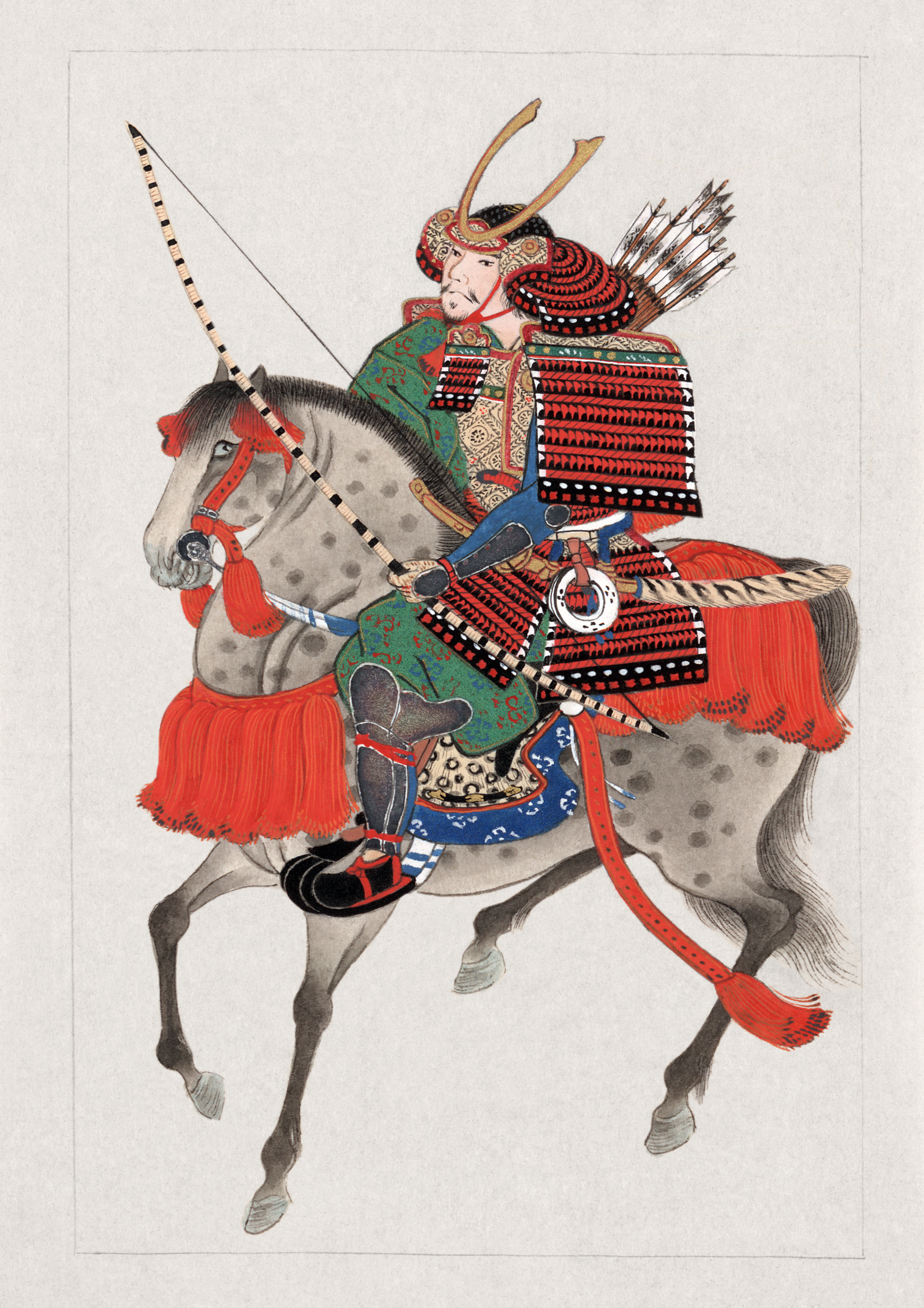
Samurai in traditional helmet and garb

In 1185 AD the aristocratic court government of classical Japan was forced to coexist with a warrior-administration, ushering in the Age of the Samurai. Just as the sons of aristocracy underwent the ceremony of genpuku to signify their adulthood, so did the sons of warrior nobility. The central feature of genpuku throughout this time period was the placing of a samurai helmet, rather than court cap, by a high status warrior. Adult samurai received their swords and armor at this time. After going through genpuku, youths were expected to do adult labor, and samurai-class men acquired full warrior status and were expected to fight in open battle. In addition, youths gained the right to marry, and to officiate at shrine ceremonies. The ceremony acted to bind youth to the previously mentioned high status warrior. Often this practice was used to confirm and solidify the social status of samurai families. For example, a samurai family of lower status might, through the ceremony of genpuku, become tied to a higher status family. The lower status son would then act as a retainer to the higher status warrior to whom he was tied. After genpuku, warrior sons were accepted as full adults and welcomed to a career in the warrior-administration.

The average age of genpuku varied over time. For example, throughout the Tokugawa period (1603–1868), the age at which children underwent genpuku depended upon whether there was unrest. Full-fledged warriors were expected to take part in battle, so during the unsettled first years of the Tokugawa period, parents delayed genpuku until their sons were full-grown, at around 20 years old. However, as the country became more peaceful, a transition period resembling adolescence emerged. Young boys underwent genpuku and trained to be warriors under an older warrior, but did not engage in war. War acted as a sort of consummation following genpuku, solidifying societal acknowledgement of full adult warrior status. As the long peace continued, the appropriate age to transition from child to adult was lowered in response to dynastic pressures to marry and produce heirs. Boys could not marry until they came of age, so the "adolescent phase" vanished. By the 1700s the average coming of age of samurai-class boys was at 15 to 17, and in the early to mid-1800s it dropped to an average of 13 to 15.

==== Muromachi period (1338–1573) ====
During the Muromachi period, a period set within the Age of the Samurai, genpuku gradually spread from the samurai class to include men and women of lower ranks. Within the less wealthy, genpuku was used as a way of acknowledging an entrance into occupational roles, often in the form of apprenticeship. Boys of farming families and the artisan class came of age at 15 to 17, an age that had more to do with their ability to do adult work and take on adult social responsibilities than with their readiness for marriage or war. As a result of the new meanings tied to the ceremony and work, the once solid transitions between childhood and adulthood were lost within the artisan and merchant classes. Adulthood was put off in order that youth could acquire more or new skills related to their future occupations, resulting in the re-emergence of a period resembling adolescence.

=== Warabi Town, 1946 ===
Today's form of the Japanese Coming of Age Ceremony has roots from the Youth Festival held in Warabi Town (currently Warabi City), Kitaadachi County, Saitama Prefecture on November 22, 1946, shortly after Japan's defeat in World War II. At the time, when Japan was in a state of despair due to the defeat, Shojiro Takahashi, then the leader of the Youth League of Warabi Town (later the mayor of Warabi City), hosted a youth festival in order to give hope and encouragement to the young people who would bear Japan's future. The festival was held in a tent on the school grounds of Warabi First Elementary School (currently North Warabi Elementary School), which included the Adulthood Ceremony. This ceremony spread throughout the country and became the present Coming of Age Ceremony.

In Warabi City, it is still called the Adulthood Ceremony. On the Coming of Age Day in 1979, the city erected a monument to mark the birthplace of the Coming of Age Ceremony in Warabi Castle Site Park and commemorated the 20th anniversary of the promotion to a city and the 30th anniversary of the establishment of Coming of Age Day.

=== The first holiday ===
Inspired by Warabi's youth festival, the Japanese government promulgated and enacted the National Holidays Law in 1948, to be held every year on January 15. The official holiday aimed "to realise the passage from youth to adulthood, and to celebrate and encourage young people embarking on their adult lives".

In 1949, January 15 was designated as the Coming of Age Day to congratulate and exhort young people to become adults and live independently. Since then, the Coming of Age Ceremony has been held on this day in most regions of Japan. Later, with the 1998 revision of the National Holidays Law, the Coming of Age Day was moved to the second Monday of January in 2000. This amendment is called the Happy Monday System because it makes a long weekend (Saturday – Monday). In addition, according to a survey conducted around 2018, Nagoya City and Morotsuka Village in the Higashiusuki District, Miyazaki Prefecture also claim to be the birthplace of the Coming of Age Ceremony.

Japan's low birth rate and shrinking percentage of young people, coupled with disruptions to some ceremonies in recent years (such as an incident in Naha in 2002, when drunken Japanese youths tried to disrupt the festivities) and a general increase in the number of 20-year-olds who do not feel themselves to be adults have led to decreased attendance of the ceremonies, which has caused some concern among older Japanese. In 2012, the decline continued for the fifth year in a row, with a total of 1.22 million adults celebrating the holiday in 2012 – under half of the participants seen at its peak in 1976, when 2.76 million adults attended ceremonies. This was the first time it has declined below the 50% threshold. Japan lowered the age of adulthood in 2018 from 20 years of age to 18 which took effect in 2022. This change has caused confusion on the status of the holiday, and raised concerns among the kimono industry which profits from the garments worn during the ceremonies.

== Ceremonies ==
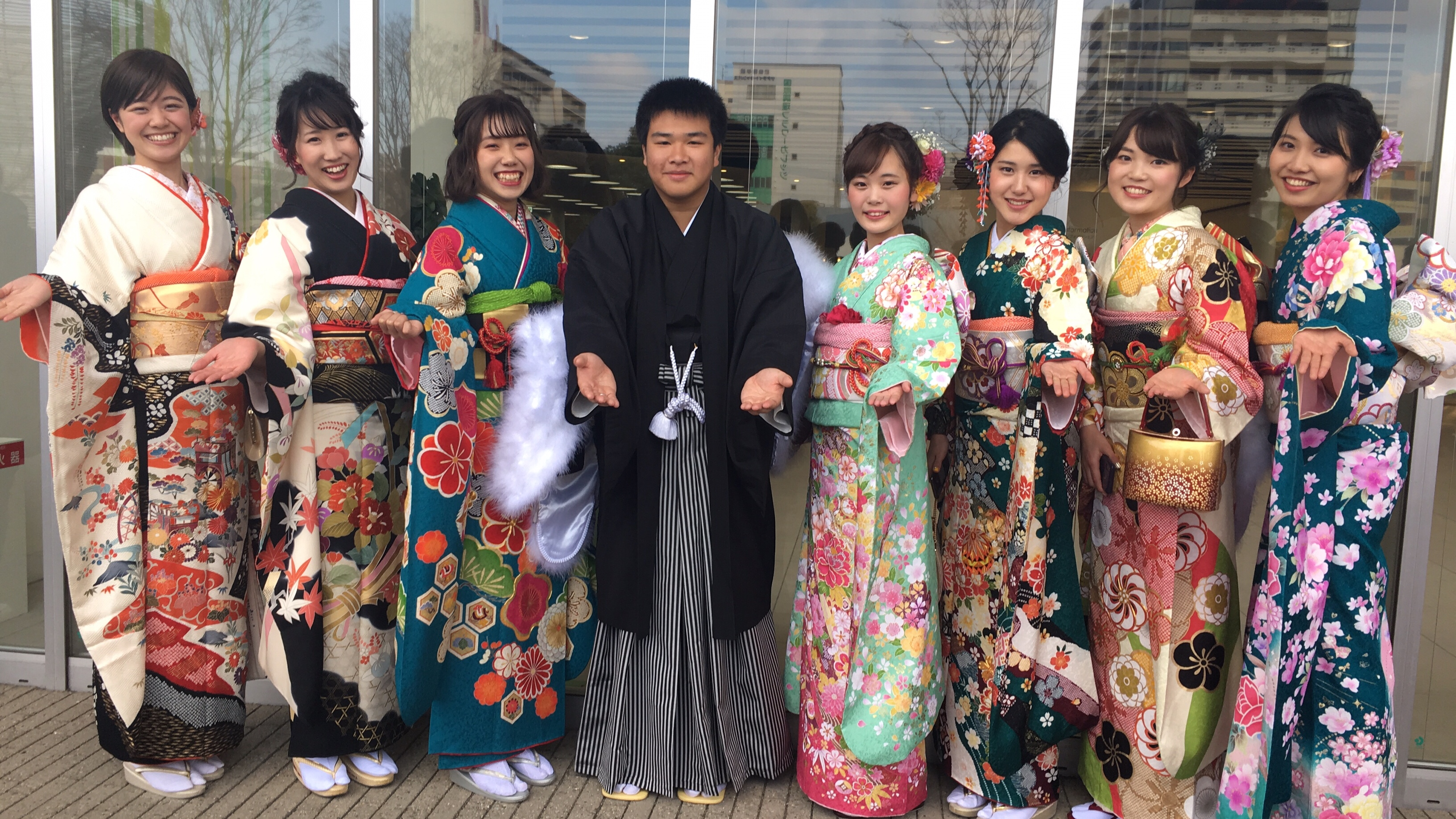
Men's and women's formal traditional dress; dark montsuki-haori-hakama, and furisode with homongi patterns

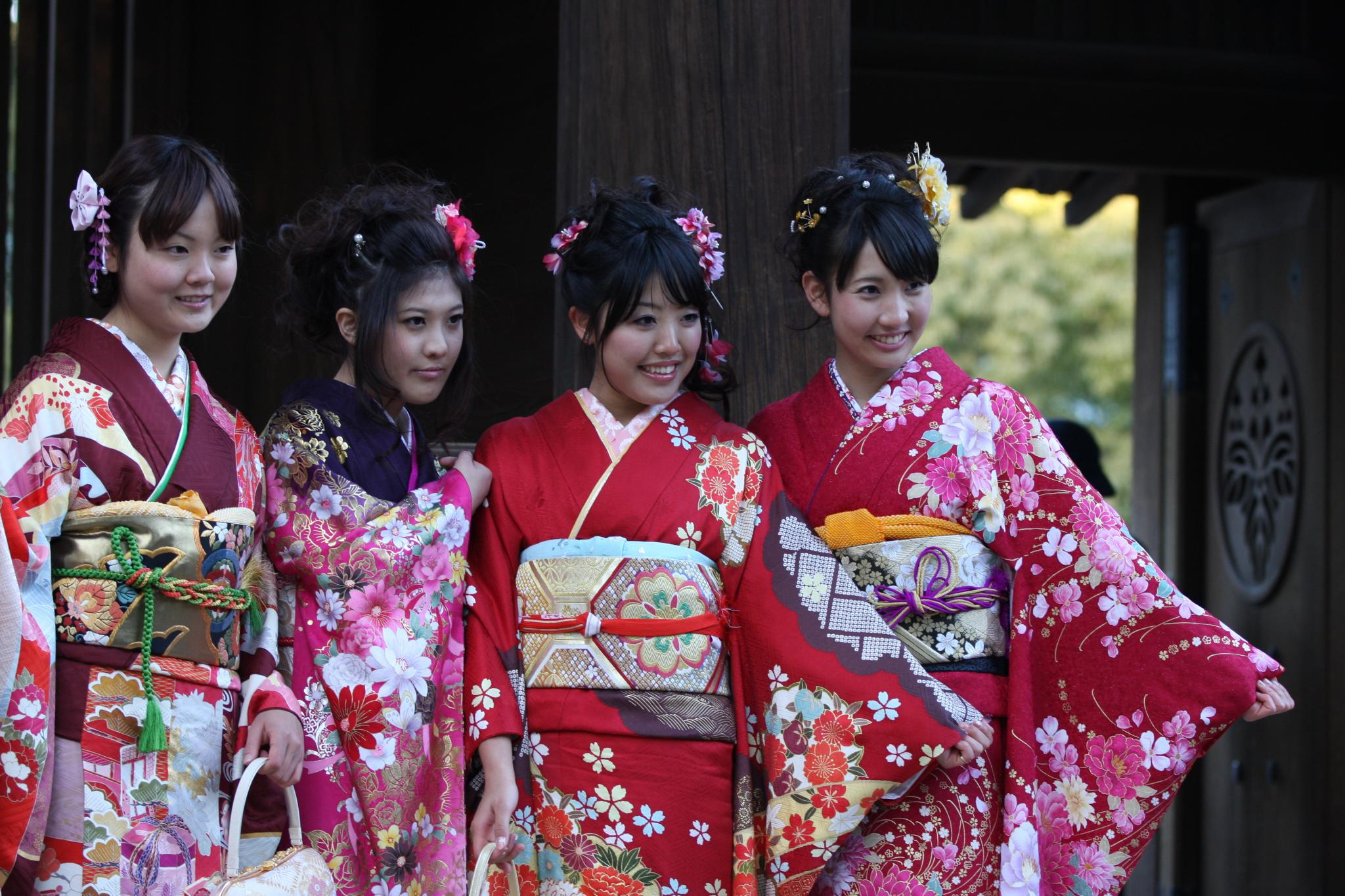
Women celebrate seijin shiki, the modern day equivalent of genpuku.

Coming of age ceremonies (成人式, Seijin-shiki) mark one's ending of coming of age (age of maturity), which reflects both the expanded rights but also increased responsibilities expected of new adults. The ceremonies are generally held in the morning at local city offices throughout Japan. All young adults who turned or will turn 18 between April 2 of the previous year and April 1 of the current one and who maintain residency in the area are invited to attend. Government officials give speeches, and small presents are handed out to the newly recognized adults.

During the ceremony, guest speakers give lectures, and commemorative gifts are presented. It is not sponsored by the Japanese government but by each municipality independently. Therefore, although the school-age system, which determines the eligibility for participation, is the same everywhere, some municipalities hold the event on days other than the Coming of Age Day. The age of adulthood was lowered from 20 to 18 on April 1, 2022. However, some municipalities continue to set the age eligible for participating in the ceremony at 20, while others have lowered it to 18.

Many women celebrate this day by wearing furisode, a style of kimono with long sleeves that hang down, and zōri sandals. Since most are unable to put on a kimono by themselves due to the intricacies involved, many choose to visit a beauty salon to dress and to set their hair. A full set of formal clothing is expensive, so it is usually either borrowed from a relative or rented rather than bought especially for the occasion. Men sometimes also wear traditional dress (e.g. dark kimono with hakama), but nowadays many men wear formal Western clothes such as a suit and tie more often than the traditional hakama. After the ceremony, the young adults often celebrate in groups by going to parties or going out drinking.

The ceremony often takes place in the city hall or school's gyms. There are some special cases such as the ceremony having been held at Tokyo Disneyland since 2002.

=== Date ===
The ceremony is commonly held on the Coming of Age Day, but there are regional variations. Some municipalities hold it during Golden Week (a week from late April to early May when Japanese holidays follow one after another), Obon (days to honor one's ancestors), or January 1–3. For example, in Niigata prefecture in 2017, no city held it on the Coming of Age Day (January 8); two were on January 7, and all others were during March, April, May, or August. It is because these areas have high snowfall, and many young people are out of town and do not come back until Golden Week or Obon. Many ceremonies were canceled or postponed in 1989 due to the death of the Emperor, and in 2020 due to the coronavirus pandemic.

=== Eligibility ===
Initially, eligible people to participate in the Coming of Age Ceremony were those with birthdays between the day after the Coming of Age Day of the previous year and that of the current year. So for the ceremony held on January 15, 1999, participants must have been born after January 15, 1980 (19 years ago), until January 14, 1981 (18 years ago). However, recently (especially since the introduction of the Happy Monday System), the school-age system has become more common. In the Japanese school system, a grade consists of students born between April 2 of a year and April 1 of the subsequent year. Today, those who legally become adults between April of the previous year and March of the current year are eligible to participate in the ceremony.

This new practice caused a problem. If the eligibility for the Coming of Age Ceremony is based on the school age, those born after the Coming of Age Day and before April 2 must attend the ceremony a year later than their peers. Consequently, they often have fewer friends to celebrate with at the ceremony.

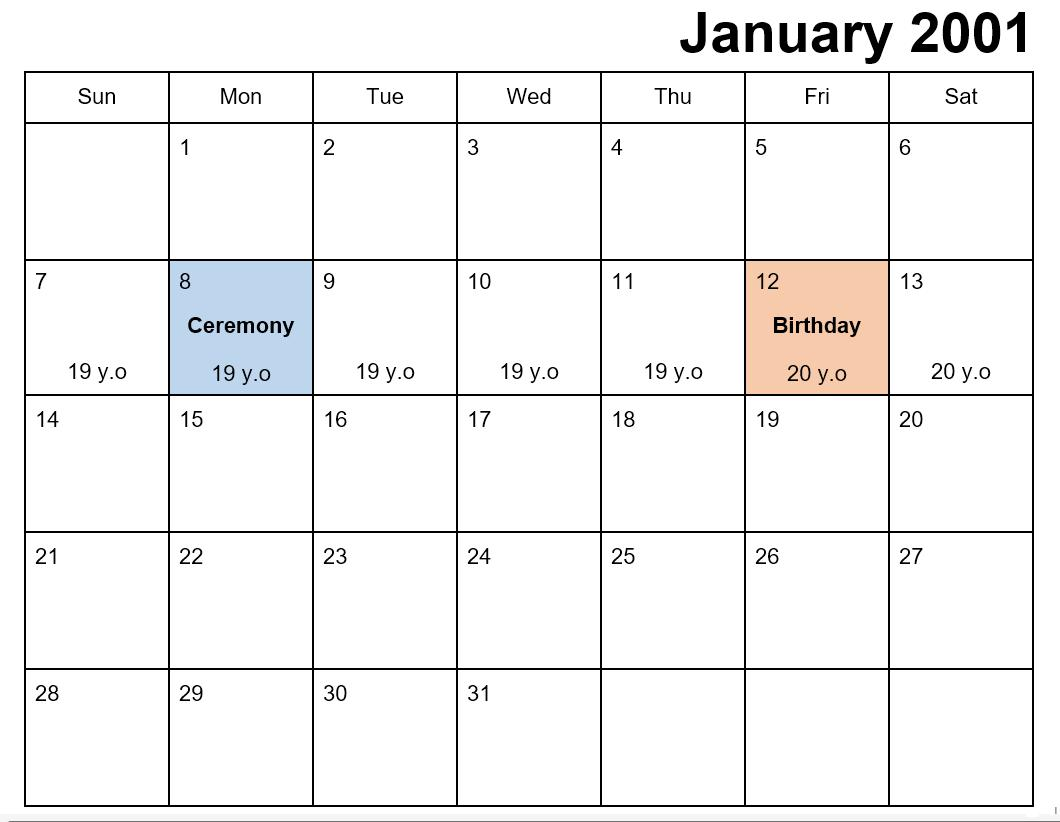
Coming of Age Ceremony 2001

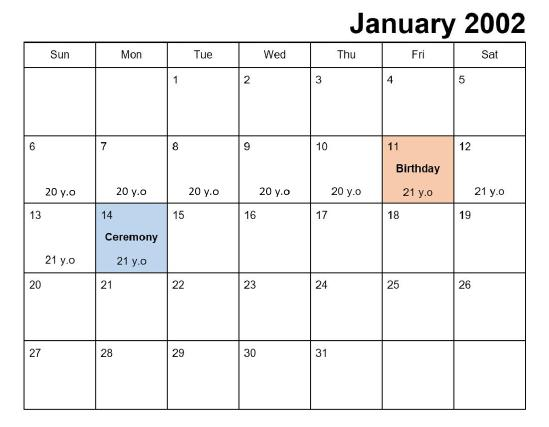
Coming of Age Ceremony 2002

Due to the Happy Monday system, there were some people who were still 19 years old at the Coming of Age Ceremony for the year, but they would become 21 years old at the ceremony of the following year. For example, as shown in the January 2001 calendar, a person born on the second Monday, January 12, 1981, was still 19 years old on the Coming of Age Day (January 8, 2001), but the same person became 21 years old on the Day in 2002. The same problem occurred for those born between January 10–13 in 1992 and January 9–13 in 1998.

Additionally, in Sapporo and Hiroshima, the calendar year system was used in which those who reached their 20th birthday between January 1 and December 31 of the past year were eligible to participate in the Coming of Age Ceremony. This system has been switched to the school-age system since 2000.

Until the 1960s, more than half of the new adults were working youths who had already entered society. However, since the 1970s, the number of students entering universities and vocational schools has increased, while the number of junior high school and high school graduates finding employment has decreased. Consequently, the ratio of students (rather than working youth) to all new adults has been increasing year by year.

The Statistics Bureau of the Ministry of Internal Affairs and Communications estimated the population of new adults in January 2020 to be 1.22 million. Its percentage in comparison to the total population had been below 1% for 10 consecutive years. The participation of people from other countries, such as technical intern trainees and international students, has also been increasing. In 2020, the city of Shiogama sent out invitations in Indonesian, Vietnamese, English, and simplified Japanese. The city had 30 foreign-born participants in 2019, about 6% of the total participating adults.

=== Business ===
In recent years, fewer Japanese people have worn kimonos. Since many participants wear expensive kimonos for the ceremony, the kimono industry promote kimonos. However, because kimonos are so expensive, many participants end up renting them or using those handed down from their mothers.

The ceremony also represents a significant commercial opportunity for the beauty industry. Businesses involved in clothing, cosmetics, and hairstyling provide services for attendees, including makeup workshops for those beginning to wear makeup more regularly, as well as the sale of cosmetic products. Photo studios offering commemorative photography for formally dressed participants also intensify their advertising efforts during this period. As a result, competition among related industries has become increasingly intense.

In 2018, Harenohi, a company that sells furisode (long-sleeved kimono) in Yokohama and other cities, abruptly shut down its business on January 8, the Coming of Age Ceremony day. This incident caused an uproar because those who had made reservations to purchase or rent a furisode from the company were unable to wear it, and some had to cancel their participation in the ceremony.

=== Problems ===
According to the public opinion survey conducted by the Yokohama City Board of Education in March 2004, among minors, new adults, and people in their 20s, approximately 20% to 30% viewed the Coming of Age Ceremony as an event like a reunion where friends meet again. Furthermore, 20% of the women in their 20s or younger responded that the ceremony is an event where new adults meet in formal suits and festive clothes. This result suggests that the event's purpose and the target group's expectations are divergent.

In this survey, 82.7% of high school students and minors said that they wanted to participate in the ceremony, while 17.2% said they did not. Among high school students and minors, the most common reason for not participating was "not interested in the content," at 36.8%. While more than 50% of high school students, minors, and new adults answered that attractions such as concerts by singers were necessary, half of them also answered that introductions of guests such as mayors and politicians were unnecessary. The Yokohama City's proposal determines that such components make the ceremony lengthy and impoverish the content.

== Risshi-shiki ==
Risshi-shiki (立志式) is a ceremony held in school for students who have turned 15 years of age; literally "establishing aspirations ceremony," in which children stand in front of the school and declare their goals for the future.

== See also ==
- Guan Li, the Chinese coming-of age ceremony
- Chu Hua Yuan, the Teochew coming-of-age ceremony
- Secular coming-of-age ceremony

== Notes ==
- In premodern Japan, ages 15, 16, 17, etc. corresponded roughly with modern Japanese and Western ages 14, 15, 16, etc. The average age of genpuku was therefore 15 to 18 in premodern Japanese reckoning, and 14 to 17 in modern reckoning.
