= AJ Rafael =

American musician

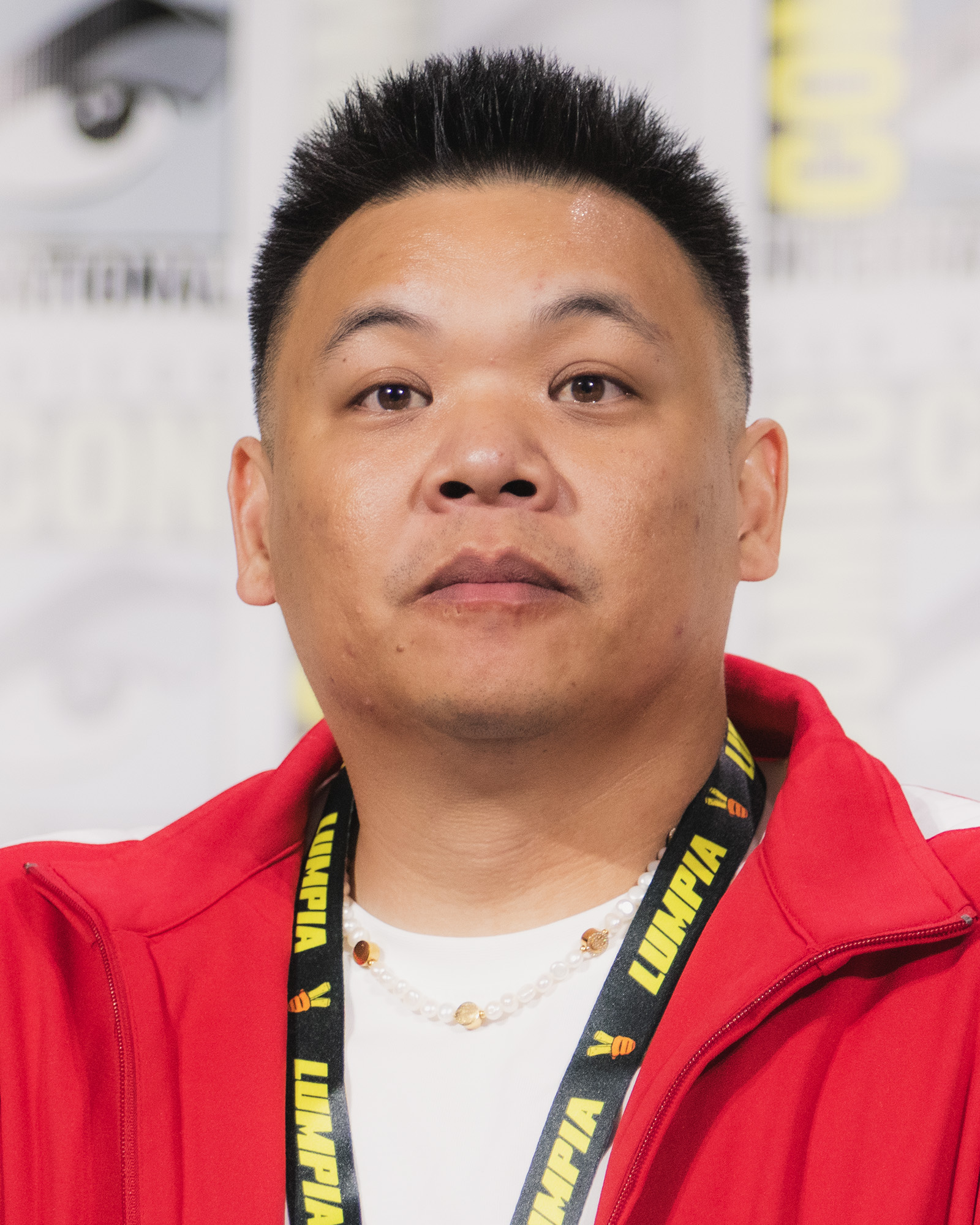
- AJ Rafael in 2026

Background information
- Born: Arthur Joseph Rafael; March 12, 1989 (age 37); Moreno Valley, California, U.S.
- Genre: Pop rock
- Occupation: singer-songwriter
- Years active: 2004–present
- Website: ajrafaelmusic.com

YouTube information
- Channels: AJ Rafael; Alyssa & AJ
- Years active: 2006–present
- Genre: Singing
- Subscribers: 1.07 million (AJ Rafael); 10.9 thousand (Alyssa & AJ)
- Views: 291 million (AJ Rafael); 307 thousand (Alyssa & AJ)
- Last updated: 2 July 2025

Arthur Joseph Rafael (born March 12, 1989), known professionally as AJ Rafael, is a Filipino-American singer-songwriter, YouTuber, and TikToker. Born in Moreno Valley, California, he attended the Berklee College of Music but did not graduate.

Rafael started a Myspace account in 2003 and uploaded a song he wrote for a girl he met on the Internet. He also uploaded a Meg & Dia medley which garnered him attention from the band and received 30,000 views. He competed on season 4 of American Idol and was eliminated. In 2006, he posted his first YouTube video which was a Meg & Dia medley. In 2010, Rafael released an extended play titled Juicebox. Early the next year, he appeared on Billboard's recently created "Uncharted" chart. He released his debut album Red Roses in 2011 and went on tours in Southeast Asia and Australia to promote it. Rafael took an indefinite hiatus from touring in 2014 after he had difficulty filling seats at his concerts despite his having a half million YouTube subscribers and millions of video views.

Inspired by the film Crazy Rich Asians, he started the Crazy Talented Asians variety show in 2018 to showcase Asians in the performing arts community. He has organized charity concerts for Autism Speaks since 2006 and started Music Speaks, an annual charity concert that informs people about autism. In 2020, Rafael released "Waking Up Sucks (Sometimes)", his first original song since 2014. He posted to TikTok an impromptu duet he did with his girlfriend, Alyssa Navarro, of the Mulan song "Reflection". Filmed while they were in quarantine in 2020 during the COVID-19 pandemic in California, the video went viral, accruing over 10 million views.

== Career ==
=== Early career (2003–2010) ===
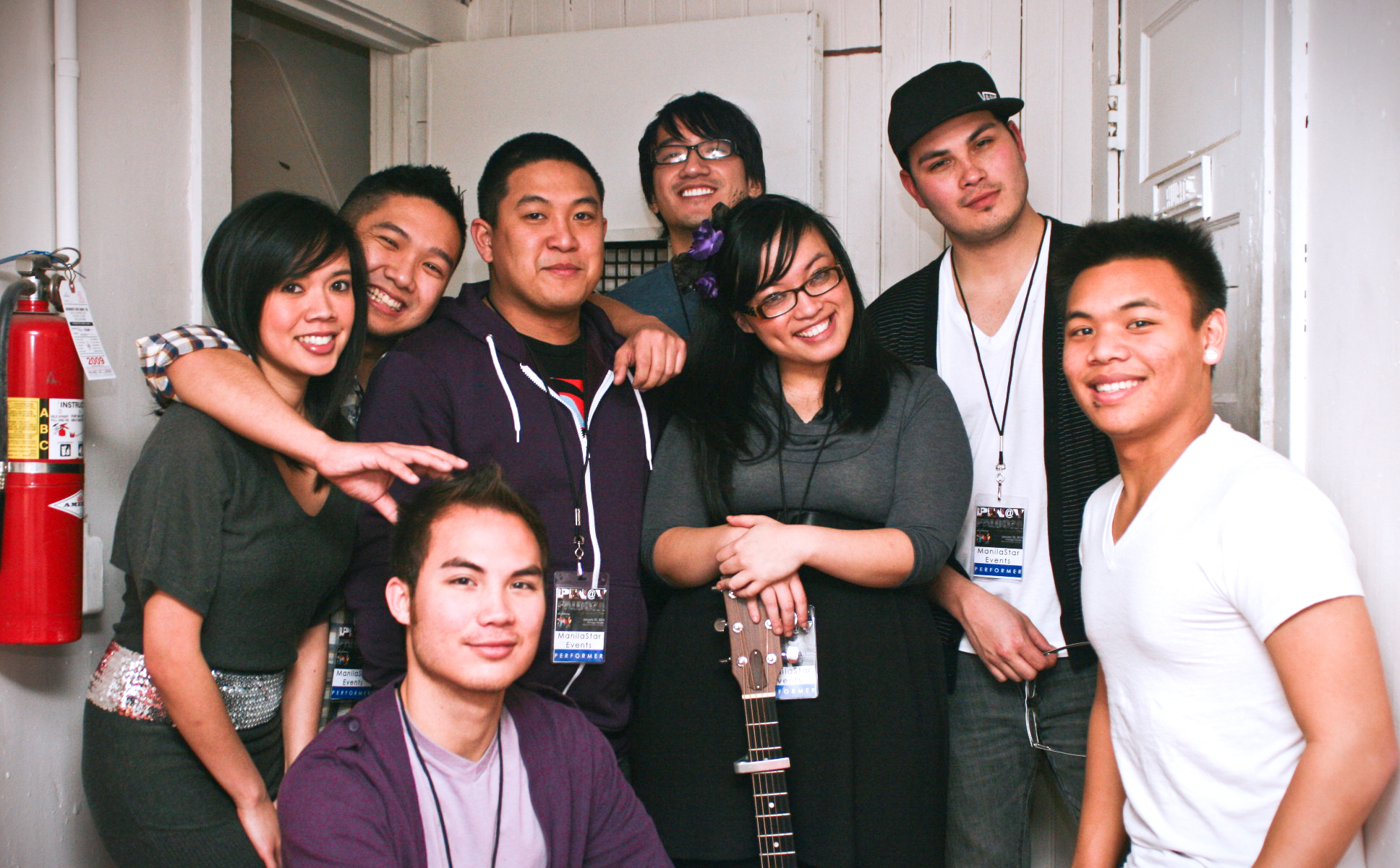
AJ Rafael (far right) at Pin@yPalooza in 2010

Rafael created a Myspace account in 2003. He wrote his first song titled "How's San Diego Pauli" in 2004 when he was 16 years old and uploaded it to Myspace. He composed the song for a girl whom he had connected with on the Internet for her birthday. Since Myspace did not support posting videos at that time, Rafael wrote JavaScript and HTML to showcase his songs through the RealPlayer media player plugin. He posted a Myspace video of himself performing a Meg & Dia medley which attracted the band's attention. The band shared his video on its Myspace page which led to the video's getting 30,000 views. Shortly after, Rafael performed in a Filipino festival in San Diego. He was a contestant in 2005 on season 4 of American Idol but was eliminated by three judges.

Rafael uploaded his initial YouTube video in 2006, a medley of Meg & Dia songs. On YouTube, he uploads covers of existing songs and composes original songs. Rafael established the MoVal Concert Chorale in 2006. Rafael became a YouTube partner in 2008, which allowed him to receive a portion of the advertising income when people watch his videos. Following several years of uploading videos, his music career began flourishing in 2009 and at the peak of his recognition, he was making in the low six figures. Since he attributed his success to forging a rapport with his fans, he routinely used Facebook and Twitter to tell his viewers about his day-to-day experiences. In his YouTube videos, filmed mostly with his MacBook in his living room, he shared with viewers how he connected with the songs he sang. To stay connected with his viewers, he made posts on Twitter frequently and sought advice from them about the tempo and key for his piano playing when he livestreamed his performances. Rafael released his songs on iTunes and Amazon and did livestreams through Ustream. In a 2009 article in the Inland Empire Weekly, journalist Lilledeshan Bose wrote, "Rafael's songs, whether on the ukulele, guitar or piano, are made in the same vein: sweet pop ballads. His voice is crystal-clear, with never a sour note in the mix." That year, Rafael was an unsuccessful contestant with his band at John Anson Ford Amphitheatre in the singing competition Kollaboration Acoustic III which seeks to raise awareness about Asian Americans in the performing arts. By 2010, he had uploaded over 150 videos that collectively accrued 80 million views. In 2010, Rafael with 178,117 YouTube subscribers was among the "50 most subscribed music channels".

=== Juicebox, Red Roses, and tours (2010–2014) ===
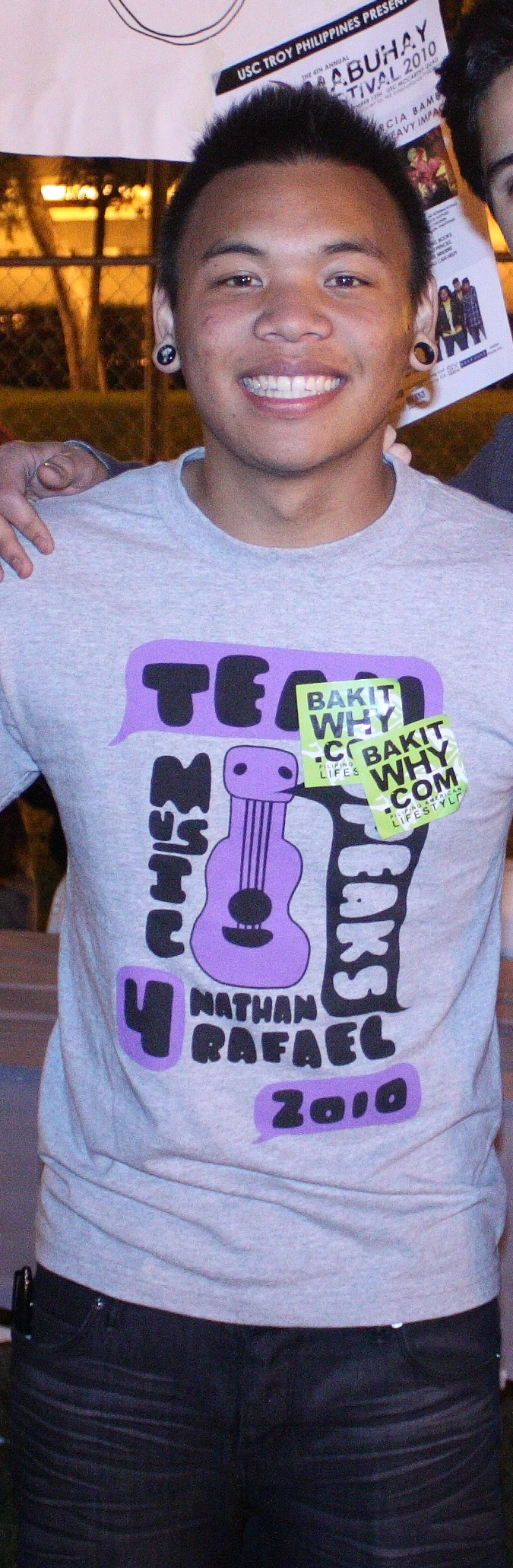
AJ Rafael in 2010

In April 2010, Rafael released his first extended play, Juicebox, copies of which people purchased online. He performed songs from the EP during in-person concerts. OC Weekly characterized his music as "pop in the vein of Jason Mraz or John Mayer with a slightly dancier, more-bubblegum-y feel". That year, Rafael routinely performed in various venues in the United States and the Philippines and landed a contract with a music management company. In 2011, he was a member of the AJ Rafael Band with Noah Bartfield on bass, Jesse Barrera on guitar, and Danny Morledge on drums. In 2011, Rafael, charted in Billboard's recently created "Uncharted" chart. That year, Billboard chose his band to compete with five others in "Battle of the Bands" with the winner performing in the Billboard Music Awards. Rafael's band was defeated by the band Gentlemen Hall.

To raise money for his first album, Rafael started a Kickstarter campaign requesting $6,000 and received $11,000 from contributors. He recorded the album in the San Diego home of a friend. Rafael released the debut album titled Red Roses on June 7, 2011. Distributed by Select-O-Hits, the album was sold on iTunes and at unaffiliated music retailers, Target Corporation, Best Buy, and FYE. It reached seventh on the iTunes "Top 10 pop albums" chart and 13th on the Billboard Heatseekers chart. The album has 11 original songs that are all based on Rafael's past relationships and experiences: Here, Tonight; Emma Watson; Red Roses; We Could Happen; Without You; Mess We've Made; Five-Hundred Days; She Was Mine; When We Say; Starlit Nights; and Here All Alone PT 3. The Philippine Daily Inquirer said "We Could Happen" and "When We Say" had "catchy beats" that "have made fans out of casual viewers". After being selected to vie for nominations for Grammy Award for Best New Artist and Grammy Award for Best Traditional Pop Vocal Album at the 54th Annual Grammy Awards, he did not receive either of the nominations. Along with a band that included Andrew Rhim on guitar, Noah Bartfield on bass, and Danny Morledge on drums, Rafael performed songs from the album in Southeast Asia and Australia. For their first show on the tour, they played live at the Music Museum in the Philippines on January 18, 2012. The attendees were primarily teenage girls. The Philippine Daily Inquirer reviewer Pocholo Concepcion found that Rafael "exuded charm and confidence as he played keyboards and sang tunes that were so honest, you had to listen and believe what he was saying" and the songs "hewed close to pop-rock with catchy mid-tempo beats, at times shifting gears to allow lead guitar solos". Rafael "engag[ed] in a fantasy conversation" in the song "Emma Watson", "wax[ed] poetic" in the song "Starlit Nights", "fe[lt] miserable" in "Red Roses", and "relish[ed] the past" in "Five Hundred Days". He worked with the actor Dante Basco and the production company Kinetic Films to create Red Roses The Movie, a musical that would have been inspired by his album with the same name and would have starred himself. After Typhoon Haiyan struck the Philippines, they stopped work on the musical to concentrate on helping the storm's victims.

Rafael performed "We Could Happen" on the ABS-CBN morning show Umagang Kay Ganda in January 2012. On January 8, 2012, he sang live on the ABS-CBN variety show ASAP 2012 with Gary Valenciano. At the end of 2012, he joined Maker Studios, an independent network of YouTube channels. In a 2012 interview with the Philippine Daily Inquirer, Rafael said his music was influenced by Jason Mraz, John Mayer, and Christina Perri, as well as the Filipino artists Kitchie Nadal, South Border, Ice Seguerra, and Gary Valenciano. In 2013, he spoke at NextDayBetter, a conference featuring Filipino Americans that is similar to the TED Talks. That year, Rafael did a collaboration with The Fung Brothers for a video titled "Asians Eat Weird Things" in which they rapped at a 99 Ranch Market about how Asians ate century egg, balut, chicken feet, pig intestines, and tripe.

=== Hiatus from tours, Crazy Talented Asians, and one million subscribers (2014–present) ===
In June 2014, Rafael penned an open letter to his viewers announcing his indefinite pause from performing at live shows in August 2014. Noting that he had over a half million YouTube subscribers and 113 million video views, he said he had difficulty attracting audiences to in-person shows. In an interview with the news website Rappler, Rafael said, "it's looking at these numbers and being like, 'How am I gonna turn this into financial support for me and my family?' That's the struggle as well. ... I have to be selfish for a little bit, I think, and kinda take it back, take a few steps back." It was challenging for Rafael to make money from writing and performing original songs that were not released by a record label and he had personal justifications for his hiatus. His last show before his break was in Guam on August 29, 2014, at Father Dueñas Memorial School's Phoenix Center. He performed songs from his album Red Roses as well as a Disney medley. Pacific Daily News reviewer Rocky Daleno said it "was a truly incredible experience and one of the best performances from a stateside artist Guam has had in several years".

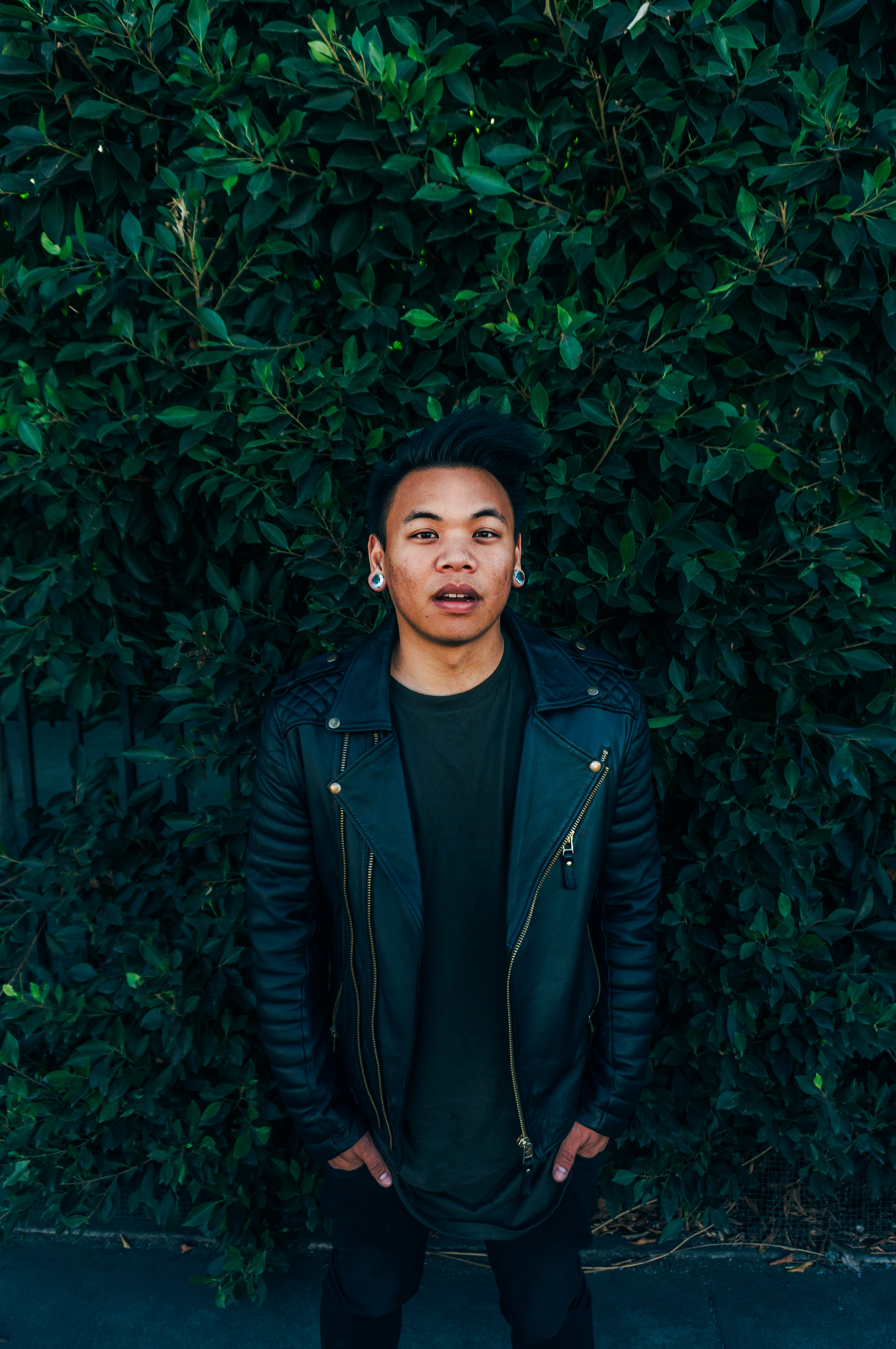
AJ Rafael in 2016 for Pretty Dudes

Around 2015, he started a Bounded, a clothing brand influenced by Disney. In 2016, Rafael inked an agreement with Disney Digital Network. In 2017, Rafael performed at VidCon at the Anaheim Convention Center. In an interview with the Orange County Register for the event, Rafael, who said he never received a recording contract, said, "I tried, but I never had the opportunity. I felt like they weren't looking for people like me – an Asian-American singer". On an October 21, 2018, episode of the music TV show Coke Studio Philippines, Rafael performed with Moira Dela Torre.

Rafael has been an actor, music director, and dancer in local musical theater shows including Tarzan. He performed in Spring Awakening in a show produced by Riverside Repertory Theater in 2016. Rafael assumed the role of Terk in a Riverside City College production of the musical Tarzan in January 2019. He performed as Pepper in East West Players's presentation of Mamma Mia! in May 2019. In February 2020, he had 933,000 YouTube subscribers. On February 1, 2020, he posted an original song called "Waking Up Sucks (Sometimes)" to YouTube. The previous time he had released an original song was in 2014.

Influenced by the film Crazy Rich Asians, Rafael in September 2018 started Crazy Talented Asians, a live variety show that showcases Asians in the performing arts community. The event, which had poetry readings, singing, and dancing, originally was hosted at the Rockwell Table & Stage in Hollywood. Crazy Talented Asians subsequently was relocated to the David Henry Hwang Theatre after East West Players began co-hosting it. Rafael co-hosted the ninth installment of the show, which was virtual, with Alyssa Navarro in December 2020. After surpassing one million subscribers on December 28, 2020, Rafael received a Gold Creator Award from YouTube in early 2021. When he received the award, he had 567 videos on his channel.

In 2026, Rafael made an appearance in the Marvel limited series Wonder Man.

== Charity and activism ==
Before 2010, Rafael performed his music on YouTube and Ustream for multiple charity events, including securing $8,000 that went to his church, $6,800 for a "Walk for Autism", and $4,000 for Typhoon Ketsana victims. After learning that his nephew was autistic, Rafael established Music Speaks, a yearly charity concert that focuses on informing people about autism. He has organized charity concerts since 2006 and participates in activities hosted by Autism Speaks.

Rafael was one of the leaders of the "#WashTheHate" social media campaign launched on March 18, 2020, to bring attention to the racism against Asian Americans related to the COVID-19 pandemic. After the police murder of George Floyd in 2020, Rafael said Asian Americans needed to "do better" in supporting people of color who are discriminated against. On May 27, 2020, he wrote on Instagram, "We can call out the injustices happening to us as we are being blamed for the coronavirus AND call out White Supremacy [and] racism happening towards the Black community by all other races (including ours)." He created online posters with the message "FILIPINOS FOR BLACK LIVES" and bemoaned that some Filipinos did not like dark skin, writing, that "[Filipinos need to] confront the colorism in our own community" since it "leads to anti-blackness then turns to racism".

== Personal life ==
Arthur Joseph Rafael was born to Arturo "Jun" Rafael and Shirley Rafael, a nurse, in Moreno Valley, California, on March 12, 1989. (Note: For his full name, Arthur Joseph Rafael; For his father's being Arturo "Jun" Rafael; For his mother's being Shirley Rafael, a nurse; For his being born in Moreno Valley, California; For his being born on March 12, 1989) Rafael's parents met singing in the same choir. His parents came from Tondo, Manila, in the Philippines. He has three sisters: Justine, Jasmine, and Aileen. Able to comprehend Tagalog, Rafael in his youth consumed Filipino cuisine and attended Filipino parties. His father, a pianist and choir director, died in September 1999 when Rafael was 10 years old. After Rafael's mom remarried in 2020, Rafael gained three stepbrothers. As a youth, Rafael accompanied his family in singing karaoke together.

Rafael started taking piano classes when he was four or five years old, first from his father and later from a classical instructor. Rafael's father hoped that his children would not pursue a career in music because of its financial instability. Rafael said about his father, "He brought music in our lives, and I want to show him that I can make a career out of it and support my family because he didn't feel like he was." After Rafael's father died, he assumed the piano playing responsibilities for their church which drove his passion in music. Rafael identifies as Catholic and in his youth attended Moreno Valley's St. Patrick's Catholic Church.

While in seventh grade at Vista Heights Middle School in Moreno Valley, California, Rafael performed in his first musical Bugsy Malone Jr. He performed in numerous musicals in high school and community college. He attended Canyon Springs High School, where he performed in Starmites and Riverside City College, where he performed in Urinetown. Rafael stated on his podcast that he graduated high school with a 1.8 GPA and attended but did not graduate from the Berklee College of Music where his major was songwriting. He has attributed Berklee professors Nancy Morris, Livingston Taylor, and Scarlet Keys as influences to his songwriting. Rafael is a fan of the Los Angeles Lakers, and is friends with former Laker Jeremy Lin.

In mid-2016, Rafael began dating Alyssa Navarro who in 2020 was a Walt Disney Studio employee in its "Multicultural Audience Engagement" organization. During the COVID-19 pandemic in California, Rafael sheltered in place with Navarro in their Glendale, California, apartment. While Navarro worked, Rafael frequently played the piano, prompting Navarro to sing along. The couple's music subsequently was played on ABS-CBN and Good Morning America. They have two dogs, Kitchie and Bean. Rafael and Navarro became engaged on December 13, 2020, at the end of Crazy Talented Asians, a variety show he had created. They married in August 2022, with Dante Basco officiating.
