= Dion Basco =

American actor (born 1977)

- Born: Dionysio Basco; January 29, 1977 (age 49); Pittsburg, California, U.S.
- Occupation: Actor
- Years active: 1988–present
- Relatives: Dante Basco (brother); Ella Jay Basco (niece)

Dionysio Basco (born January 29, 1977) is an American film and television actor of Filipino heritage. His brothers Dante, Darion and Derek Basco are also actors, as is his niece Ella Jay.

Basco was born in Pittsburg, California. He is best known for his roles as Alberto "Al" Ramos on the NBC Saturday morning sitcom, City Guys and as Flip in the 2003 film, Biker Boyz. Basco also played Marco Quito in the 1996 film Race the Sun, starring Halle Berry. His other credits include Biker Boyz alongside older brother Dante and The Debut alongside remaining family members Derek, Darion and Arianna. He was seen on the web series Pretty Dudes alongside Yoshi Sudarso and Beau Sia, and appeared as young Poppy Li's father in season 3 of Mythic Quest.
