= Beau Sia =

American slam poet (born 1976)

- Born: Beaufort Benjamin Sia; 1976 (age 49–50); Ohio, U.S.
- Occupation: Poet
- Website: beausia.com

Beaufort Benjamin Sia (simplified Chinese: 谢福源; traditional Chinese: 謝福源; pinyin: Xiè Fúyuán; Pe̍h-ōe-jī: Siā Hok-gôan, born 1976) is an American slam poet.

== Life and career ==
Sia was born in Ohio. He is of Chinese-Filipino descent. Raised in Oklahoma City, Oklahoma, Sia discovered spoken word poetry on MTV as a teenager. When not participating in his high school's swim team, he spent time at Oklahoma City's only open mic night.

In 1995, Sia moved to New York City, where he attended the New York University's Tisch School of the Arts dramatic writing program. He has said that moving to New York City made him conscious of his identity as an Asian American, something that he denied often in Oklahoma City. His cultural identity became a common theme in his poems.

Sia began performing at the Nuyorican Poets Cafe, eventually earning himself a place on the 1996 Nuyorican National Poetry Slam team. That same year, he was filmed for the documentary SlamNation. The film followed Sia and his Nuyorican teammates (Saul Williams, Jessica Care Moore and muMs da Schemer) as they competed at the 1996 National Poetry Slam. The team went on to place third in the nation, and have a lasting impact on how people view slam poetry. In the book Words In Your Face: A Guided Tour Through Twenty Years of the New York City Poetry Slam, author Cristin O'Keefe Aptowicz wrote of Sia's impact, noting

Beau Sia took Maggie Estep's pop culture reference-heavy work to the next level, bouncing across the stage, frenzied and electrified. His work was confrontational, hilarious and unapologetic. Sia was a firebrand who seemed determined to smash the prevailing stereotypes of Asian-America, the ones that painted Asian-Americans as being meek, passive and voiceless.

Sia's relationship with the Poetry Slam community continued. He eventually earned two National Poetry Slam Championships in 1997 and 2000 while competing on the NYC-Urbana national poetry slam team. He also reached second place in the Individual Poetry Slam competition in 2001.

Inspired to mischief by a reading A Night Without Armor – a book of poems by the folksinger Jewel – Sia composed a parody entitled A Night Without Armor II: The Revenge. It was reviewed for Entertainment Weekly by Alexandra Jacobs, who noted, “[Sia’s] deadpan parodies of such Jewel gems as ‘God Exists Quietly’ (‘inside my underwear/why don’t you come over/and say hello’)…have quickly won a following.”

Sia then began touring around Europe and the United States. He also appeared in films and published a wide range of his works in book and compact disc form. He also released an album on Mouth Almighty Records, a spoken-word imprint of Mercury/PolyGram Records that was active during the 1990s.

== Works ==
- Sia, Beau. A Night Without Armor II: the Revenge. New York: Mouth Almighty Books, 1998.
- Sia, Beau. Attack! Attack! Go! Compact disc released in 1998 by Mouth Almighty/Mercury/PolyGram Records.
- Sia, Beau. The Undisputed Greatest Writer Of All Time. Long Beach: Write Bloody Publishing, 2012.
- Sia, Beau. White Power. Los Angeles: Not A Cult, 2017.

=== Inclusion in anthologies ===
- Cabico, Regie and Todd Swift, eds. Poetry Nation: The North American Anthology of Fusion Poetry. Vehicle Press, 1998.
- Colby, Todd, ed. Heights of the Marvelous : A New York Anthology. St. Martin's Griffin, 2000. (On the Amazon.com listing for this book, "Seau Bia" posts a review that is nothing but a plea for attention to Beau Sia.ISBN 0-312-26335-X)
- Glazner, Gary Mex, ed. Poetry Slam: The Competitive Art of Performance Poetry. San Francisco: Manic D Press, 2000.
- von Ziegesar, Cecily, ed. Slam. New York: Alloy Books, 2000. (This book also includes quotes by Sia on what poetry is, the writing process, etc.)
- Sanchez, Sonia; Medina, Tony; and Rivera, Lois Reyes, eds. Bum Rush the Page: A Def Poetry Jam. Three Rivers Press, 2001.
- Katz, Daniel R., ed. Why Freedom Matters: The Spirit of the Declaration of Independence in Prose, Poetry, and Song from 1776 to the Present . Workman Publishing Company, 2003.
- Glazner, Gary Mex. How to Make a Living as a Poet. (Interview) Soft Skull Press, 2005.
- Brown, Derrick C. The Last American Valentine: Illustrated poems to seduce and destroy Write Bloody Publishing, 2008.
- Eleveld, Mark, ed. "The Spoken Word Revolution Redux". Sourcebooks MediaFusion, 2007

=== Film and television ===
Sia's appearances on television were on Def Poetry; he later appeared in the Broadway version, Def Poetry Jam.

He appeared in Slam in 1998 as Jimmy Huang. The same year, he participated in the documentary SlamNation as himself. Later appearances include The Manchurian Candidate (2004) as a late-night comedian on television and Hitch (2005) as Duane Reade Clerk.

Sia portrays the protagonist in the music video for Wolf Like Me by the band TV on the Radio.

Sia portrays a minor character, Cicero, in Jeremy Saulnier's directorial debut, Murder Party (2007).

Sia plays Norman Sklear, a wedding czar emcee in Rachel Getting Married (2008).

In 2015, Sia appeared in yet another Jonathan Demme film, Ricki and the Flash, followed by a recurring role on the web series Pretty Dudes alongside such actors as Dion Basco and Yoshi Sudarso.

=== Video games ===
Sia, in collaboration with former Gearbox Software writer Anthony Burch, created the narrative for the exploration video game Failsafe.

== Bibliography ==
- Glazner, Gary Mex, ed. Poetry Slam: The Competitive Art of Performance Poetry. San Francisco: Manic D Press, 2000. ISBN 978-0916397661
- Sia, Beau. A Night Without Armor II: the Revenge. New York: Mouth Almighty Books, 1998. ISBN 9780966204292
- von Ziegesar, Cecily, ed. Slam. New York: Alloy Books, 2000. ISBN 978-0141309194

=== Online ===
- Sia, Beau (October 5, 2000). "Audio of "8 Year Old Reject" and "What I Did Last Summer"". Salon.com. Archived from the original on March 25, 2012.
- Audio of "Howl," "Money," "Gym" and "G.I. Joe Freestyle" on Indiefeed Performance Poetry Channel
- Mouth Almighty interview
- The Angry Poet: Beau Sia
- Article on Russell Simmons Def Poetry Jam by the New York Daily News
- Preview for "The Drums Inside Your Chest" Poetry concert film featuring Beau Sia
