= Fung Brothers =

American comedy and YouTube duo

David and Andrew Fung
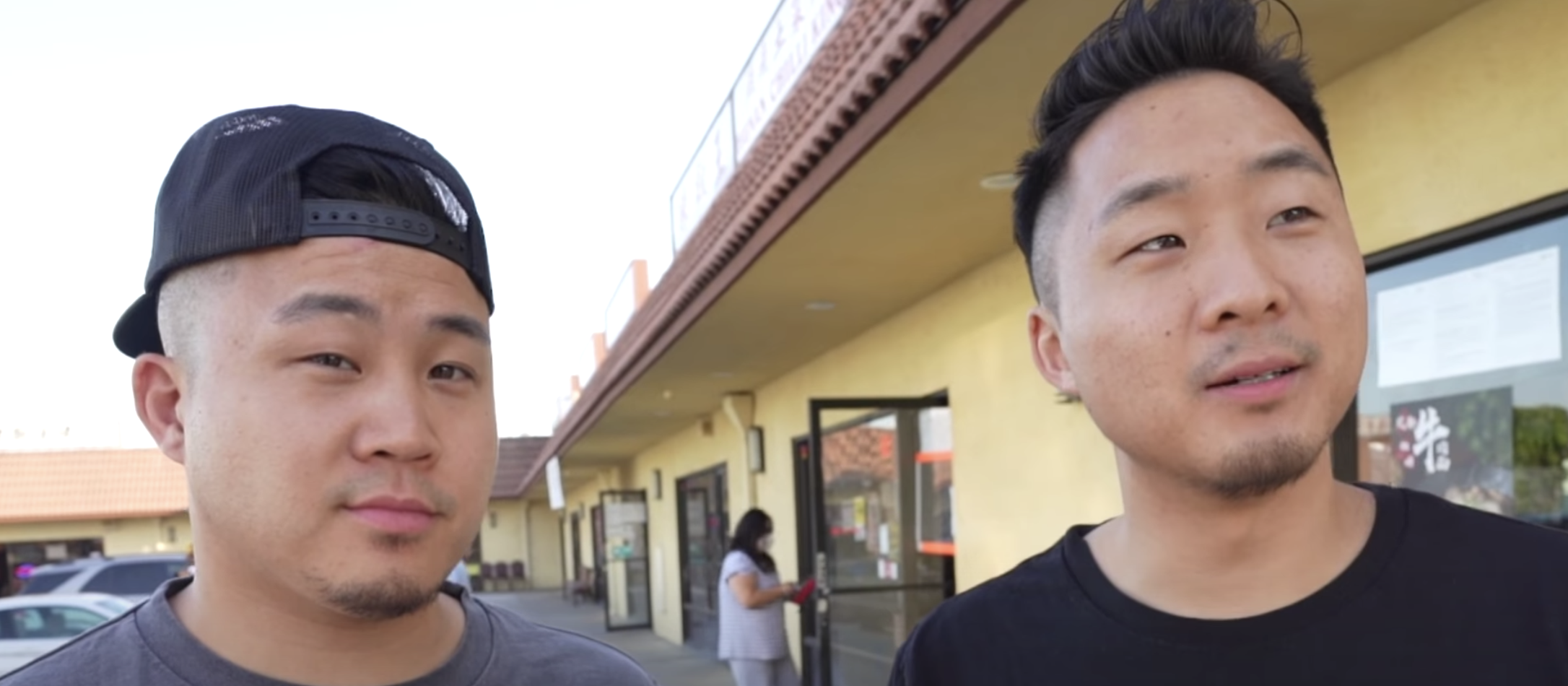
- The Fung Brothers in July 2020
- Other names: Fung Bros., 馮氏兄弟
- Notable work: "The Jeremy Lin Effect - Fung Brothers" "Bobalife" "Asians Eat Weird Things"; Interview with Andrew Yang

Comedy career
- Medium: Social Media, Stand-Up Comedy
- Genres: Comedy, Cultural Commentary, Food
- Subjects: Asian American lifestyle, Asian food, hip hop music
- Website: fungbrothers.com

Fung Brothers are an American duo consisting of Andrew Fung (born March 30, 1989) and David Fung (born September 1, 1986). They were born and raised in Kent, Washington and gained traction in the early 2010s especially due to their YouTube videos regarding NBA player Jeremy Lin, Asian cuisine, and the "626" area of the San Gabriel Valley. They have produced content regarding topics such as: haircut styles, sneakers, men's fashion, hip-hop music videos, Asian stereotypes, Asian masculinity, and responding to Asian discrimination. Their work has been featured in Huffington Post, Los Angeles Times, NBC News, Wall Street Journal and CNN.

They also had a 13 episode TV series on A&E Network's FYI channel titled Broke Bites: What the Fung?! However most of their own YouTube content consisted of conversations about Asian American subject matter.

With Grandmaster Jason Chu, Andrew and David formed a rap group known as "Model Minority", which has released a mixtape titled Model Minority Report that has been reviewed favorably in The Los Angeles Times. In the rap group, Andrew Fung's stage name is Inglish and David Fung's is D-One. They graduated from University of Washington.

== Background ==
Andrew and David Fung were born in the United States to Chinese parents and grew up in the East Hill neighborhood in Kent, Washington. Their father was born in Guangzhou and raised in Hong Kong, and their mother was of Shandong ancestry born in Shanghai, and raised in China and Japan; specifically Shandong, Shanghai, Hong Kong, and Tokyo.

The Fung brothers attended Kentwood High School. After graduating from University of Washington at Seattle, the Fung brothers decided to settle in the Los Angeles area, initially in Koreatown, and later on in Monterey Park and Alhambra in the San Gabriel Valley of Los Angeles County.

== Work ==
=== TV shows and food channels ===
In 2015, the Fung Brothers started hosting a show on the A&E Network's FYI channel entitled Broke Bites: What the Fung?! In the series, Andrew and David travel across the U.S. in search of the best local spots to eat, with a budget of only fifty dollars.

In 2012, they starred on a program on the "Hungry" YouTube channel titled The Fung Brothers Mess With Texas. In this show, they tried restaurant food in various regions of Texas.

=== Interviews ===
The Fung Brothers have been making various videos about Taiwanese American NBA player Jeremy Lin ever since he first signed with the Golden State Warriors. Their most popular Jeremy Lin videos are the "Jeremy Lin Effect" series, made during the height of "Linsanity" when Lin joined the New York Knicks, and the videos have been covered by CNN (pointing out that they were the first ones to use the phrase), The Wall Street Journal, The Washington Post, Yahoo! Sports, and Taiwan News Station CTV. The first Jeremy Lin Effect video was directed, produced and edited by Mike Eshaq, and the second one, known as "Linsanity" was directed, produced and edited by Timothy Tau, and the third one, titled "Linsanity Withdrawals," was directed, produced, and edited by Tommy Su. The Fung Brothers wrote and acted in all of them.

In 2019, the brothers interview then presidential candidate, Andrew Yang, which was a vital part of Yang's initial push on social media including Joe Rogan and The Breakfast Club.

In 2020, The Fung Brothers interviewed NFL Ram's rookie Taylor Rapp, about his Asian ancestry and the struggle of being overlooked. In the interview he explained that Jeremy Lin was a big inspiration when he needed encouragement in believing he could make it to the NFL.

David Fung has also interviewed celebrities through a popular Korean website, Soompi.com. Some notable interviews include hip hop group Far East Movement.

=== Music videos ===
The Fung Brothers have also released a rap video titled "626" directed by Jason Poon set to the beat of Wiz Khalifa's track, "Young, Wild and Free," that highlights the various Asian restaurants in the San Gabriel Valley area.

They have also done another song titled "Colima Road" about the various Asian food establishments in the Rowland Heights area, directed by Dan Zhao. Another popular viral video that they have done is a music video for a rap they performed titled "Wanking in the Dorm Room" also directed by Dan Zhao.

On February 20, 2013, The Fung Brothers released a music video titled "Bobalife", also directed by Jason Poon, about the Taiwanese drink boba milk tea, which is also known as "bubble tea" or "pearl tea" and is popular among young Asian Americans, especially in the "626" area code. The music video has been covered by the likes of The Huffington Post, 8asians, Angry Asian Man, and more.

In July 2013, the Fung Brothers released a music video for a song titled "Asians Eat Weird Things" on YouTube. The song features vocals from AJ Rafael, and was partially filmed in a 99 Ranch Market store, who they partnered up with for the video.

In July 2014, another music video of the title "Singapore & Malaysia" was released on YouTube. The song portrays the variety of foods and cultures in the Southeast Asia countries, Malaysia and Singapore.

=== Comedy ===
In 2022, David Fung co-starred alongside The Daily Show's Ronny Chieng in a Netflix produced web episode titled "Ronny Chieng Takes Chinatown". The piece featured Jeremy Lin, Simu Liu and has amassed over 1.3 million views on Netflix Is A Joke's YouTube channel. Later that year, The Fung Brothers performed at the Asian American Comedy Festival, an event organized by Edward Pokropski, in New York City. Other notable comedians in the lineup included Karen Chee, Yuhua Hamasaki.

In 2023, the duo started hosting their own monthly mixed media comedy show in New York City's Lower Eastside called Fung Bros Present: Asianology, an Asian culture based comedy show with uncensored, witty jokes tackling a variety of Asian and Asian-American related topics.

=== Business ===
In April 2022, the Fung Brothers joined the advisory board of Legendary Ventures, a venture capital firm with offices in Los Angeles, New York and San Francisco. At the same time, they also launched Fung Brothers Ventures alongside Legendary Ventures to accelerate startups like Posture360 and XFrost.

On August 10, 2022, Andrew Yang joined the advisory team at Legendary Ventures, an early stage venture capital firm, to drive strategic value across the firm's portfolio of consumer retail technology investments, alongside Fung Brothers Ventures.

In July 2024, Jade & Clover, a Chinese apothecary-inspired lounge in lower eastside Manhattan, used the Fung Bro's SMÁLÀ chili oil as one of their cocktail ingredients.

=== Community impact ===
In 2021, the Fung Brothers alongside several others helped organize a large Rally Against Hate at Columbus Park in New York City.

In 2024, the Fung Brothers were recognized as one of the social media creators who helped amplify the TAAF STAATUS Report 2024, which was a finalist for Research Reports for the 9th Annual Shorty Awards.
