= Samantha Irvin =

American ring announcer and singer

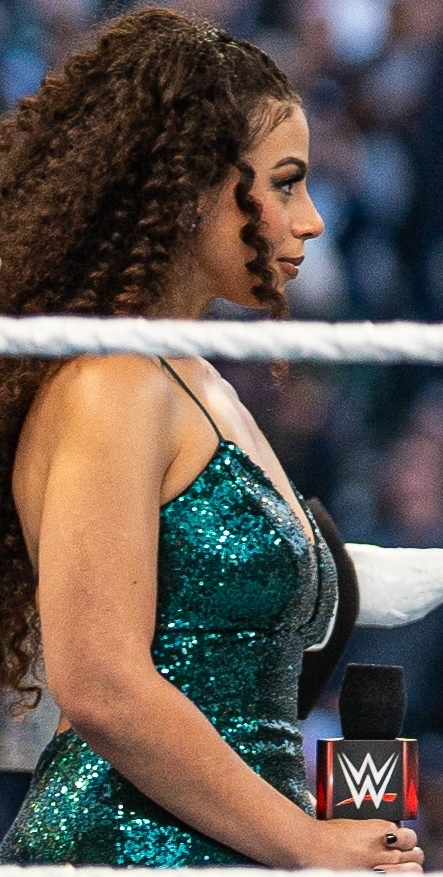
- Irvin in 2024
- Born: Samantha Johnson; January 9, 1989 (age 37); Dennis, Massachusetts, U.S.
- Other names: Samantha; Samantha Irvin; Samantha The Bomb
- Occupations: Musician; ring announcer
- Spouse: Ricochet (m. 2025)
- Children: 1

Samantha Johnson (born January 9, 1989) is an American musician and former ring announcer best known for her time as a ring announcer in the professional wrestling promotion WWE from 2021 to 2024 under the ring name Samantha Irvin.

== Early life ==
Johnson was born in Dennis, Massachusetts, in 1989, the eldest of six siblings. At the age of four, she began studying classical music, going on to compete in classical flute at a national level. At the age of 12, her family moved to the North End neighborhood of New Bedford, Massachusetts, where she attended Normandin Middle School. As a child, she was a fan of professional wrestling, and attended WrestleMania XIV in Boston, Massachusetts, in 1998. She went on to attend New Bedford High School, where she starred as Dorothy Gale in a performance of The Wonderful Wizard of Oz and won a gold medal at the International Association of Jazz Educators State Jazz Finals as part of the New Bedford High School Jazz Choir. As a teenager in the mid-2000s, she twice auditioned for American Idol. After graduating in 2007, Johnson worked as the Drama Club director for Normandin Middle School and as a waitress. At the age of 20 she auditioned for America's Got Talent.

== Musical career ==
From 2011 to 2015, Johnson performed as the lead female vocalist on the Michael Jackson tribute show Thriller – Live. In 2015, she appeared on season 10 of America's Got Talent, auditioning with "(You Make Me Feel Like) A Natural Woman" by Aretha Franklin; she was eliminated in the semi-finals. Later that year, she starred in a show titled "Home" in the Zeiterion Performing Arts Center in New Bedford in which she sang, whistled, danced, told stories, and played the flute; her five siblings all appeared in the show. In 2016, she released an EP, 27Underground, including the debut single "Jump High"; her siblings provided backing vocals. In the same year, she portrayed Betty Rizzo in a production of Grease staged in the New Bedford Festival Theatre. In 2020, Johnson appeared on I Can See Your Voice on FOX, playing the flute and singing "Good as Hell" by Lizzo. After relocating to Las Vegas, she appeared in productions including Vegas! The Show (portraying Gladys Knight and Tina Turner). In February 2025, after having departed WWE to refocus on her musical career, Johnson adopted the stage name "Samantha The Bomb" and announced the release of a single, "Make Me".

== Professional wrestling career ==
Johnson was introduced to the professional wrestling promotion WWE by WWE Hall of Famer Mark Henry. She originally auditioned at the WWE Performance Center to be a wrestler, but was unsuccessful. In April 2021, she was hired by WWE as the ring announcer for WWE 205 Live on Peacock. She adopted the ring name "Samantha Irvin". Irvin went on to serve as a ring announcer for WWE NXT on the USA Network. In January 2022, she was promoted to being the ring announcer for WWE SmackDown on FOX. In May 2023, she moved to being the ring announcer for WWE Raw on the USA Network. At WrestleMania XL in April 2024, Irvin introduced 14 matches; her performance garnered praise from veteran announcer Michael Buffer. In October 2024, Irvin announced her departure from WWE. In a February 2025 interview, she stated "my wrestling career has barely even begun".

== Filmography ==
Title	Year	Role	Notes
Got 2B Real: The Diva Variety Show	2012	Christina Aguilera	Episodes: "Crispy Business", "Long Time, No Seat"
Got 2B Trill: The Untold Story	2015	Christina Aguilera	
Social Girl	2019	Virginia Washington	Episode: "Too Young"

== Personal life ==
Johnson became engaged to professional wrestler Ricochet in 2023; the couple married in 2025. She has a daughter from a previous relationship.
