= Buffalo Boys =

2018 film by Mike Wiluan

- Film poster
- Directed by: Mike Wiluan
- Screenplay by: Rayya Makarim; Raymond Lee
- Story by: Mike Wiluan
- Starring: Ario Bayu; Yoshi Sudarso; Pevita Pearce; Tio Pakusadewo; Reinout Bussemaker; Daniel Adnan; Alex Abbad; Conan Stevens; Alexander Winters
- Cinematography: John Radel
- Edited by: Sean Albertson
- Production companies: Infinite Frameworks; Zhao Wei Films
- Distributed by: Screenplay Infinite; XYZ Films; Nikkatsu
- Release dates: July 14, 2018 (Montreal); July 19, 2018 (Indonesia)
- Countries: Indonesia; Singapore
- Languages: Indonesian; English
- Budget: Rp 30 billion (US$2.2 million)

Buffalo Boys is a 2018 Indonesian–Singaporean action Western film directed by Mike Wiluan. The film had its world premiere at the Fantasia International Film Festival in Montreal on 14 July 2018, and was released theatrically in Indonesia on 19 July. It was selected by Singapore as its entry for the Best Foreign Language Film at the 91st Academy Awards but did not make the nomination list.

== Plot ==
Buffalo Boys opens in the American West. Its two protagonists, a pair of brothers named Jamar (Ario Bayu) and Suwo (Yoshi Sudarso), have just finished working with their uncle on the Transcontinental Railroad. While riding a train on their journey back to Indonesia, the pair fight against a band of white gangsters—foreshadowing what's to come. Upon arriving in Indonesia, Jamar and Suwo get caught up in the struggles of a Javanese village against an evil Dutch administrator named Captain Van Trach. Together, the brothers must fight Van Trach and his henchmen to free native Indonesians from colonial oppression.

== Cast ==
- Ario Bayu as Jamar
- Mike Wiluan as Mango
- Yoshi Sudarso as Suwo
- Pevita Pearce as Kiona
- Tio Pakusadewo as Arana
- Reinout Bussemaker as Van Trach
- Zack Lee as Leung
- Daniel Adnan as Drost
- Mikha Tambayong as Sri
- Alex Abbad as Fakar
- Hannah Al Rashid as Adrie
- Happy Salma as Seruni
- Donny Damara as Sakar
- El Manik as Suroyo
- Donny Alamsyah as Young Arana

== Production ==
=== Development ===
Director Mike Wiluan told Medcom.id, in an interview published the day before the film's premiere, that he had been frustrated with colonial-themed Indonesian films being political dramas, likening it to a classroom - "We sit in the cinema for an hour or two not to jump to class or study again" - and wanted to explore a more creative route. He first came up with the idea of a cowboy Western set in colonial Java in 2014, three years before production on the film, with actor Ario Bayu being among the first to be informed of his plans. The initial script for the film was roughly 150 pages before being condensed to 100 pages.

=== Pre-production ===
On 3 July 2017, actor Tio Pakusadewo first revealed details of the film to Kompas and announced that he was set to appear in it alongside the likes of Ario Bayu, Pevita Pearce, Happy Salma, Donny Damara and El Manik. Principal photography was scheduled for 20 August 2017.

The total number of actors and crew involved with the film numbered between 220 to 230 people. The rehearsals and pre-production took about three months. Pevita Pearce stated that she underwent archery training for two months, and trained with stuntmen from France and Thailand during rehearsals. Pearce added that riding the kerbau (water buffalo) was a "very big challenge" for her, describing them as "wild" and harder to control than horses.

Yoshi Sudarso stated that he was the last to join the cast, having joined a month before filming began and a week after reading the script. He had difficulty with Indonesian, after having moved to the United States at age nine where he lived for 20 years and wasn't as fluent in the language. He spent a month learning Indonesian, and stated that costars Pevita Pearce, Hannah Al Rashid and others were helpful. Sudarso also revealed he was offered a lucrative eight-year Hollywood contract as a stuntman and had to choose between doing the film or accepting the contract. After reading the script and speaking to the director, he made the decision to work on Buffalo Boys because his "heart and mind was in acting, not stunts anymore." Speaking to NBC News, Sudarso stated: "Westerns are such a big part of American culture, but as Asian Americans, we never see ourselves in them."

=== Filming ===
The film was shot on location in Yogyakarta, Java and in a studio in Batam, Riau Islands. In Yogyakarta, the production rented land in the Watu Murah area of Nanggulan, Kulon Progo. Scenes were typically shot between 3 AM and 6 PM. Filming took place across 40 days. They shot in Yogyakarta for two weeks, with the rest being shot at their studio in Batam.

According to Wiluan, they had initially thought riding a water buffalo would be easy and similar to riding a horse. However, they found it to be one of the most difficult tasks. The biggest obstacle was the erratic weather; when it rained they would shelter inside as it made it difficult to film outdoors.

== Release ==
A teaser trailer for the film was released on 16 March 2018. The full-length trailer was released on 20 April. On 2 May, the line-up for the 28th Fantasia International Film Festival was announced which included a world premiere for the film slated for 14 July 2018 in Montreal, Quebec, Canada.

== Reception ==
On review aggregation website Rotten Tomatoes, Buffalo Boys has a 79% approval rating based on 34 reviews and an average rating of 6.5/10. Its critical consensus reads: "It's hampered somewhat by its disappointingly familiar story, but Buffalo Boys makes up for its shortcomings with plenty of exciting action sequences." On Metacritic, the film has a weighted average score of 48/100 based on 11 reviews, indicating "mixed or average reviews".

Justin Lowe of The Hollywood Reporter stated: "Leveraging highly polished production values evoking the Old West with detailed sets, authentic weapons and period costumes, Wiluan gets enough of the details right so that the genre's typical characteristics blend fairly seamlessly with the Indonesian adventure yarn." He commended Reinout Bussemaker and Tio Pakusadewo's performances as stand outs, but described the rest of the cast's performances as being "fairly one-dimensional". Indonesian critic Andi Baso Djaya of Lokadata stated: "Apart from fighting scenes using machetes and hand-to-hand duels that combine silat techniques with other martial arts, another unique feature is the action of Kiona, Jamar, and Suwo riding a water buffalo [...] the use of these characteristics is symbolic of marrying the very Western cowboys with the localities of the archipelago," while adding that the film's biggest flaw is its lack of character exploration.

Indonesian critic Agniya Khoiri of CNN Indonesia praised the film's action choreography and its depiction of colonialism, but criticized its quality of CGI and its choice of forgoing spoken Javanese and Dutch in favor of Indonesian and English. Indonesian critic Paskalis Damar of SinekDoks stated: "As an action blockbuster, this Western crawls too deep into muds of character introductions and event set-ups, despite its straightforward premise [...] the movie also often suffers from clumsy scene transition. Disjointed scenes makes the dramatic portion feels a little incoherent and jumpy." Brian Thompson of TheYoungFolks rated the film 7/10 and stated that "the film treats each fluid battle sequence as a miniature ballet. Calling upon both high noon shootouts and poetic martial arts precision, the transcendent actions set pieces strewn throughout Buffalo Boys are expertly staged."

Michael Sragow of Film Comment stated: "What Wiluan's movie lacks in subtlety, consistency, or depth, it makes up for in confidence, gusto, and local color, like a trip to the Javanese sultans' burial ground and its magnificent spired ruins." Dennis Harvey of Variety stated that "the script provides few surprises," adding that "with its superficial nods to both Hollywood and Spaghetti Western conventions, Wiluan's film isn't aiming for dramatic weight. It's simple escapism with a modern attitude and a nostalgic veneer that doesn't go much deeper." Roger Moore rated the film 2/4, stating: "Buffalo Boys is rather tedious going in between the fights, and those action beats are spaced too far apart" and added that the "finale has the tone the entire movie should have aimed for. It's over-the-top, with ridiculous firearms (grenade launching shotguns in 1860 Indonesia), heroes surviving mortal wounds, the works."

Alex Suszko of TasteOfCinema ranked the film at #17 on its list of "The 20 Best Western Movies of The 2010s" in November 2019.

== See also ==
- List of submissions to the 91st Academy Awards for Best Foreign Language Film
- List of Singaporean submissions for the Academy Award for Best Foreign Language Film
