= Got 2B Real: The Diva Variety Show =

- Also known as: Got 2B Real
- Genre: Comedy; Parody
- Created by: Andrea Lee
- Starring: Andrea Lee; Jamaal D. Pittman; Terrivio-Wesley
- Country of origin: United States
- Original language: English
- No. of seasons: 2
- No. of episodes: 15

Original release
- Release: July 29, 2011 – December 13, 2015

Got 2B Real: The Diva Variety Show (often simply referred to as Got 2B Real) is an American parody reality television web series on YouTube created by and starring Andrea Lee. The series was heralded as "hilarious", "genius" and "art."

== Premise ==
A group of popular singers throw shade and read each other, reinvigorating past rivalries and discussing current events.

== Characters and cast ==
Creator Andrea Lee (under her pseudonym "Patti LaHelle") voiced the following characters, all based on well-known music legends and performers:

- Patti LaBelle – The main focus of the series and leader of Team Class.
- Aretha Franklin – LaBelle's primary antagonist and leader of Team Sass. Nicknamed "Hateretha" by Dionne, her other main foe during the series.
- Beyoncé Knowles – Member of Team Sass. Portrayed as aloof but arrogant, particularly with regards to her former bandmates in Destiny's Child as well as Rihanna and Fantasia.
- Mariah Carey – Member of Team Class and, as in real life, Patti's honorary goddaughter. Had conflict most frequently with Rihanna, Aretha, and Christina Aguilera.
- Janet Jackson – Member of Team Class. Known for her very exaggerated light speaking voice and ridiculed by other divas for it.
- Chaka Khan – Member of Team Class who was often the voice of reason.
- Rihanna – Member of Team Sass. Portrayed as a bit childish; would always reference "coconuts," allegedly a slang term for "beef" in her native Barbados. Most frequently sparred with Beyoncé and Mariah.
- Fantasia – Often prone to malapropisms or mangled versions of real words (e.g., "creationary," instead of "creative", “misunderstated”, & “upstraperous”). Appears in Season 1 and the last 2 episodes of Season 2.
- Toni Braxton – Member of Team Class. Feuds with Mary J. Blige; often insulted regarding her financial woes and her sisters. Appears mostly in Season 2.
- Mary J. Blige – Member of Team Sass. Feuds with Toni Braxton; often insulted for being off-key in live performances. Appears mostly in Season 2.

Lee voiced additional guest appearances by Brandy, Diana Ross, Nene Leakes, Joseline Hernandez, Tami Roman, Iggy Azalea, Kelly Rowland, LaTavia Roberson, Erykah Badu, Tamar Braxton, Kandi Burruss, Barbara Walters, Nick Cannon, Lady Gaga, Iyanla Vanzant, Oprah Winfrey, Nicki Minaj, Lil’ Kim, Blu Cantrell, Jay-Z, Shaun Robinson, Celia Cruz, Cristina Saralegui, and briefly, Andy Cohen.

Additionally, several references to the British TV series "Downton Abbey" were made, to great effect, with Lee voicing the part of Maggie Smith's character Violet Crawley. The premiere episode of season two had a "Harry Potter"-inspired plot, with Lee again voicing Maggie Smith, this time in her role as Professor Minerva McGonagall, as well as voicing Professor Dumbledore. Going with the "Potter" theme (where the boy attends a school for "witchcraft and wizardry"), the Divas instead attend an important meeting at a school for "bitch-craft" and "wiggetry". This is the moment when, whether the Divas like it or not, they are separated into "Team Class" and "Team Sass", apparently by Professors McGonagall and Dumbledore. "The order is random," McGonagall tells the ladies, "…like some of you here today."

Other lead characters were voiced by Terrivio-Wesley (Dionne Warwick), Jamaal D. Pittman (Whitney Houston), Darcell Bios (Maya Angelou), and Samantha Johnson (Christina Aguilera).

== Impact and legacy ==
The show was launched the same year as Issa Rae's Awkward Black Girl and the Tracie Thoms-starring Bandwagon, two other popular Black-centered digital series. G2BR immediately reached the very pop culture icons represented on screen. Whitney Houston's daughter Bobbi Kristina tweeted that the first episode was funny, and Jackée Harry, Chaka Khan, and Patti LaBelle were confirmed viewers.

Lee followed up the series with a film finale, Got 2B Trill: The Untold Story in December 2015. She later wrote for the series Pretty Dudes. In November 2020, the Patti LaHelle YouTube channel was deactivated, and all the original episodes were subsequently removed from the platform. But fans have since archived the videos and re-uploaded them on other channels, in addition to the Internet Archive.
