= Pretty Dudes =

American LGBTQ digital dramedy

- Genre: Dramedy; Sex comedy LGBTQ; Independent
- Created by: Chance Calloway
- Directed by: Chance Calloway
- Starring: Bryan Michael Nuñez; Xavier Avila; Kyle Rezzarday; Yoshi Sudarso; Tiffany Commons; Joshuah Noah Snel; Aria Song; Manny Shih; Christian Olivo; Tae Song; Olivia Thai
- Opening theme: "How We Break ('Pretty Dudes' Anthem)" by Matt Almodiel, Chance Calloway and Peter Su: "How We Break (A.J. Sealy Remix)" by A.J. Sealy
- Composer: Trey Randol
- Country of origin: United States
- No. of seasons: 2
- No. of episodes: 39

Production
- Executive producers: Chance Calloway; Jomar Miranda
- Producers: Matthew Elam; Elton Keung
- Cinematography: Andrew Ge; Somlit Inthalangsy
- Editors: Anthony "Tony Blaze" Blaisdell; Boki Vukajlovic
- Camera setup: Single-camera
- Running time: 9–34 minutes
- Production company: Stoopid Ambitious

Original release
- Release: March 25, 2018 – present

Pretty Dudes is an American LGBTQ digital dramedy created by Chance Calloway that tells the story of a group of friends in Southern California who navigate in and out of platonic and romantic relationships. Predominantly featuring an inclusive and intersectional cast and crew, the series stars an ensemble that includes Xavier Avila, Tiffany Commons, Bryan Michael Nuñez, Kyle Rezzarday, Manny Shih, Joshuah Noah Snel, Aria Song, Tae Song, Yoshi Sudarso, and Olivia Thai. Pretty Dudes aired initially on YouTube and streams on Amazon Prime Video and VOD service Stoopid Ambitious as of 2019.

== Premise ==
Set in the greater Los Angeles area, the series follows a group of millennial friends of varying races, genders, and backgrounds as they navigate platonic and romantic relationships. Photographer Zario (Bryan Michael Nuñez), business law student Ellington (Xavier Avila), gamer Alexander (Kyle Rezzarday), and doumi Jay (Tae Song) live with model Sunji (Yoshi Sudarso), where they are frequently visited by hard-drinking neighbor Eagle (Olivia Thai). After entering a bet to get Zario a new boyfriend, resentments and betrayals cause friction in the group. The second season expands the main group to include painter Kish (Tiffany Commons), art gallery owner December (Aria Song), Ellington's younger brother Marshall (Joshuah Noah Snel), and December's younger brother Boaz (Manny Shih).

== Cast and characters ==
=== Main cast ===
Character	Actor	Occupation	Seasons	
Character	Actor	Occupation	1	1.5
Hector "Zario" del Rosario	Bryan Michael Nuñez	photographer	Main	Guest
Ellington Gomez-Pacheco	Xavier Avila	business law student	Main	Main
Jericho "Jay" Kim	Tae Song	doumi	Main	
Alexander Erzhähler	Kyle Rezzarday	gamer	Main	Main
Sunji Spencer	Yoshi Sudarso	model and actor	Main	Main
Eagle Diolosa	Olivia Thai	active duty airman	Main	
Marshall Gomez-Pacheco	Joshuah Noah Snel	unknown	Recurring	Main
December Lín	Aria Song*	art critic	Recurring	Main
Rock Diolosa	Marc Fajardo	unknown	Recurring	Main
Kish Yancey	Tiffany Commons	painter		Main
Boaz Lín	Manny Shih*	photographer		Main
Cassian "The Body" Crosby	Christian Olivo†	actor		Main
^{†}Prior to joining the cast as season two regulars, both Manny Shih and Aria Song appeared earlier in the season, Song in a guest spot (episode: "The Death of Romeo") and Shih in a recurring status.^{*}Olivo appeared in a recurring status for the majority of the season, though was credited as a lead for his initial consecutive appearances.

=== Recurring ===
- Stacy Snyder as Mandy
- Cesar Cipriano as Shane Cortez
- Chelsea Gray as Ty
- Kelsey Toussant as Calligraphy "Callie" Reynolds
- Stanley Wong as Erwin Lee
- Leo Lam as Gregory
- Carlin James as Elijah
- Nicko Sabado as Lando
- Courtney Grant as Tevin
- Sammy Cantu as Ken Dahl (season 2)
- Charlit Dae as Ram Takada (season 2)
- Tatiana A. Lee as Geneva Fauntleroy (season 2)
- Anthony Ma as Michael Michigan (season 2)
- Brennan Mejia as Carver Gomez-Pacheco (season 2)
- Peter Adrian Sudarso as Quincy (season 2)
- Angelique Maurnae as Armoni Chantal (season 2)
- Henita Telo as Fable (season 2)
- Amira Gray as Nia (season 2)
- Dickie Hearts as Chance (season 1)
- Michael Bow as Genie (season 1)
- Clifford Cisneros as Zach Largaespada (season 1)
- Tony Garbanzos as Patrick (season 1)
- Beau Sia as Stranger (season 1)

=== Guest ===
- Dion Basco as Samuel ("All-American Type")
- Osric Chau as Vincint ("The Death of Romeo")
- Giovannie Espiritu
- Wilson Lai as Korey ("Spectrum")
- Avalon Penrose as White Kish ("Chicos Lindos")

== Episodes ==
Season	Episodes	Originally released	
Season	Episodes	First released	Last released
1	19	October 11, 2016	April 4, 2017
2	19	December 24, 2019	TBA

=== Season 1 ===
No. overall	No. in season	Title	Directed by	Written by	Original release date
1	1	"The Curse"	Chance Calloway	C.S.R. Calloway & Tony Garbanzos	October 11, 2016
Alexander, Ellington, Jay, Sunji, and Zario have an unsuccessful night at the club. Episode notes: Dedicated in memory of filmmaker Oscar Micheaux. Cast notes: First recurring appearances of Cesar Cipriano (Shane), Tony Garbanzos (Patrick), Amanda Suk (Jerrica), and Kelsey Toussant (Callie).
2	2	"The Dudes Make a Bet"	Chance Calloway	C.S.R. Calloway	October 18, 2016
After returning from the club, the Dudes decide to enter a high-stakes bet to find Zario a new boyfriend. Episode notes: Dedicated in memory of singer Juan Gabriel.
3	3	"Girls"	Chance Calloway	C.S.R. Calloway	October 25, 2016
Jay consults with a Stranger and Ellington's younger brother Marshall for assistance with gay dating apps. The Dudes head to the gym, but not before Zario has an awkward run-in with Ellington's girlfriend Mandy. Episode notes: Dedicated in memory of activist Marsha P. Johnson. Cast notes: First recurring appearances of Joshuah Noah Snel (Marshall), Stacy Snyder (Mandy) and Beau Sia (Stranger).
4	4	""Who's Miss Bliss?""	Chance Calloway	C.S.R. Calloway	November 1, 2016
Alexander uncovers mysterious details about Sunji's past. Sunji meets with a director about a potential role. Episode notes: Dedicated in memory of performer Dorothy Dandridge. Cast notes: First recurring appearance of Stanley Wong (Erwin).
5	5	"Millennial Gay"	Chance Calloway	C.S.R. Calloway	November 1, 2016
The Dudes try to use their expertise in picking up women to give Zario confidence to get back into the gay dating scene. Jay's positive he's going to win the bet, which causes Ellington to devise ways to up the stakes. Episode notes: Dedicated in memory of writer and activist James Baldwin. Cast notes: First appearances of Olivia Thai (Eagle). Thai would be upgraded to lead with the very next episode.
6	6	"The First Straw"	Chance Calloway	C.S.R. Calloway	November 15, 2016
Zario goes out on the first date of the bet, with a nervous suitor chosen by an equally nervous Alexander. Ellington reveals that he has plans to marry Mandy. Episode notes: Dedicated in memory of Eddie Aikau. Cast notes: First recurring appearances of Dickie Hearts (Chance), Nicko Sabado (Lando), and Jeffrey Jay Soto (Mick).
7	7	"Americano"	Chance Calloway	C.S.R. Calloway	November 22, 2016
The Dudes discuss gender, sexuality, and marriage over coffee. Episode notes: Dedicated in memory of Vincent Chin. Cast notes: First recurring appearances of Aria Song (December) and Chelsea Gray (Ty).
8	8	"They Call It Falling for a Reason"	Chance Calloway	C.S.R. Calloway & Jeremy Sinclair	December 4, 2016
While out on a date with Eagle's pick for the bet, Zario reminisces about his relationship with Shane (Cesar Cipriano). Episode notes: Dedicated in memory of Jason Raize.
9	9	"All-American Type"	Chance Calloway	C.S.R. Calloway	December 5, 2016
Zario takes pictures for a podcast, where a group of industry performers discuss the state of Asian American representation in filmmaking. Sunji, Jay, and Alexander battle a spider. Episode notes: Dedicated in memory of Sessue Hayakawa. Cast notes: First recurring appearances by Dion Basco, Chance Calloway and Carlin James, all of whom would not appear again until the second season. First recurring appearance by Leo Lam (Gregory).
10	10	"Dem Genes"	Chance Calloway	C.S.R. Calloway	December 13, 2016
Jay's cousin stops through town in the middle of the night and Jay drags Zario along to meet him. Ellington's proposal to Mandy gets interrupted when she presents a proposition of her own. Episode notes: Dedicated in memory of brothers George and Willie Muse. Cast notes: First of two guest appearances by Michael Bow (Genie).
11	11	"Three Dinners"	Chance Calloway	C.S.R. Calloway	December 20, 2016
Eagle finally convinces Rock to have the Dudes over at their place. Sunji puts a plan into motion in hopes of getting Jerrica back. Zario goes on date number five, but runs into Chance again. Episode notes: Dedicated in memory of electronic engineer Gerald "Jerry" Lawson. Cast notes: First recurring appearance by Kevin Young.
12	12	"How We Break"	Chance Calloway	C.S.R. Calloway	February 14, 2017
Zario and his date grow a deeper connection. Eagle and Rock's prank war escalates uncomfortably. Sunji's attempts to woo Jerrica backfire. Episode notes: Dedicated in memory of writer Qiu Miaojin.
13	13	"Level Up"	Chance Calloway	C.S.R. Calloway	February 14, 2017
The Dudes decide to focus their energy on fitness over romance, but Alexander and Eagle both find potential love connections at the coffee shop. Episode notes: Dedicated in memory of Hazel Ying Lee. Cast notes: First recurring appearance by Clifford Cisneros (Zach).
14	14	"Bedfellows"	Chance Calloway	C.S.R. Calloway	February 28, 2017
In the course of one night Episode notes: Dedicated in memory of songwriter Howard Ashman.
15	15	"Healthy Competition"	Chance Calloway	C.S.R. Calloway	March 7, 2017
Zario gives Mr. Seventeen a redo date, but memories of his past relationships threaten to sour the mood. 'Episode notes: Dedicated in memory of performer Eartha Kitt.
16	16	"Tastes Like Finger"	Chance Calloway	C.S.R. Calloway & Bryan Michael Nuñez	March 14, 2017
Zario gives Mr. Seventeen a redo date, but memories of his past relationships threaten to sour the mood. Episode notes: Dedicated in memory of LGBT advocate Blake Brockington.
17	17	"Dude Dares"	Chance Calloway	C.S.R. Calloway & Tony Garbanzos	March 21, 2017
Tensions rise with a high stakes game of Truth or Dare. Episode notes: Dedicated in memory of boxer Muhammad Ali.
18	18	"Liminal Spaces"	Chance Calloway	C.S.R. Calloway	March 28, 2017
Zario decides who wins the bet as all the Dudes congregate at Eagle and Rock's place. Episode notes: Dedicated in memory of writer Essex Hemphill. Cast notes: This episode marks the final appearance of Beau Sia as Stranger.
19	19	"Where the Music's Strong, the Drinks Are Loud"	Chance Calloway	C.S.R. Calloway	April 4, 2017
Zario and Marshall go out to celebrate the end of the bet, and the night Episode notes: Dedicated in memory of Calloway's older brother Travis Parker Johnson. Episode title is pulled from the 1989 Patti LaBelle song "Still in Love."; Cast notes: This episode marks the final appearances of Tae Song (Jay), Olivia Thai (Eagle), Tony Garbanzos (Patrick), and Jeffrey Jay Soto (Mick).

=== Season 2 ===
No. overall	No. in season	Title	Directed by	Written by	Original release date
20	1	"The Death of Romeo" (triple-length season premiere)	Chance Calloway	C.S.R. Calloway & Christopher Edelen; FlickIt Presents! The Death of Romeo written by Vince Cruz	March 17, 2020
21	2	"The Death of Romeo" (triple-length season premiere)	Chance Calloway	C.S.R. Calloway & Christopher Edelen; FlickIt Presents! The Death of Romeo written by Vince Cruz	March 17, 2020
22	3	"The Death of Romeo" (triple-length season premiere)	Chance Calloway	C.S.R. Calloway & Christopher Edelen; FlickIt Presents! The Death of Romeo written by Vince Cruz	March 17, 2020
The Dudes are back, and there are big changes. The Gomez brothers have moved in with Sunji, Alexander, and Zario in a new house. Sunji and Zario don't seem to be getting along, and Alexander starts a beef with Kish, the tenant who lives in Sunji's basement. The Dudes throw a fateful housewarming party. Episode notes: Dedicated to the memory of Spencer Williams. Cast notes: Joshuah Noah Snel (Marshall) becomes a regular cast member. First appearances of regular Christian Olivo (Cassian) and first recurring appearance of Manny Shih as Boaz.
23	4	"Amnesty Night"	Chance Calloway	C.S.R. Calloway & Christopher Edelen	TBA
24	5	"Jack of All Shades"	Chance Calloway	C.S.R. Calloway	TBA
25	6	"Chicos Lindos"	Chance Calloway	C.S.R. Calloway & Christopher Edelen	TBA
26	7	"Meat Cute"	Chance Calloway	C.S.R. Calloway & Christopher Edelen	TBA
27	8	"Set Phasers to Ho"	Chance Calloway	C.S.R. Calloway	TBA
28	9	"Gobble Gobble"	Chance Calloway	C.S.R. Calloway & Christopher Edelen	TBA
29	10	"Cake Responsibly"	Gerry Maravilla	C.S.R. Calloway & Christopher Edelen	TBA
30	11	"Merc'd"	Chance Calloway	Andrea Lee	TBA
31	12	"Spectrum"	Chance Calloway	C.S.R. Calloway & Christopher Edelen	TBA
32	13	"Untitled Sunji Spencer Project"	Stanley Wong	C.S.R. Calloway & Christopher Edelen	TBA
33	14	"Deus Sex Machina"	Chance Calloway	C.S.R. Calloway & Christopher Edelen	TBA
34	15	"Present Tense"	Heather Matarazzo	C.S.R. Calloway & Christopher Edelen	TBA
35	16	"Arm Candy"	Chance Calloway	C.S.R. Calloway	December 15, 2020
36	17	"Dick Pics, Flicks & Fucktangles"	Chance Calloway	C.S.R. Calloway & Christopher Edelen; FlickIt Presents! The Death of Romeo written by Vince Cruz	TBA
37	18	"Ken Dahl"	Chance Calloway	C.S.R. Calloway & Christopher Edelen	TBA
38	19	"The Friends We Became" (double-length season finale)	Chance Calloway	C.S.R. Calloway	TBA
39	20	"The Friends We Became" (double-length season finale)	Chance Calloway	C.S.R. Calloway	TBA

== Soundtrack ==
=== Season 1 ===
- How We Break ("Pretty Dudes" Anthem) by Matt Almodiel, Chance Calloway and Peter Su
- Overthinking by COAH
- Man Made Mess by Tim Be Told
- Invisible World (Disappear) by Paul Dateh
- Stuck On You by Marc Hightower
- What You Have by Nathan Ray Penland
- Old-Fashioned Love by Peter Su
- Underneath by Brandyn Burnette
- Wasted by Tim Be Told
- Orion by Ryan Mitchell Grey
- Change the World by Sivan Levi
- Santa Barbara by Peter Su

=== Season 2 ===
- How We Break (A.J. Sealy Remix) by Matt Almodiel, Chance Calloway and Peter Su
- Nobody Freakin' by Megan Vice

== Short films and other media ==
=== Pretty Dudes: Caught Gay-Handed ===
Caught Gay-Handed was the very first Pretty Dudes-related project, released April 30, 2017.

=== How We Break ("Pretty Dudes" Anthem) ===
Chance Calloway and Gerry Maravilla co-directed the Malibu-set music video for the series anthem. Featuring Nuñez in an unnamed role implied to be Zario, other cast members also appear in the video alongside the song's singers Matt Almodiel, Calloway and Peter Su. The song and several remixes were released as an EP compilation.

All tracks are written by MattAlmodiel, Chance Calloway and Peter Su.

How We Break (Pretty Dudes Remixes)
No.	Title	Producer(s)	Length
1.	"How We Break (Pretty Dudes Anthem) [Jericho Mix]"	7Harder	4:20
2.	"How We Break (Pretty Dudes Anthem) [A.J. Sealy Remix]"	A.J. Sealy	3:53
3.	"How We Break (Pretty Dudes Anthem) [G // Basco Remix]"	G // Basco	3:32
4.	"How We Break (Pretty Dudes Anthem)"	MattAlmodiel, Chance Calloway and Peter Su	3:23
5.	"How We Break (Pretty Dudes Anthem) [Lo-Fi Version]"	Sammy Minelli	3:49
Total length:			19:17

=== Pretty Dudes: The Double Entendre ===
Containing two episodes, "Bravo Double Delta" and "Brother's Keeper," this short was co-written by all of the season 2 writers, Chance Calloway, Christopher Edelen, and Andrea Lee.

This short doesn't seem to be in canon with the actual plot of season 2. Among other things, The Dude House is a different location, singer Tanerélle plays Kish (actress Tiffany Commons has been cast in the same role for season two), and Sammy Cantu plays a character named Aza Keeper, where his season two character is named Ken Dahl.

=== Pretty Dudes: The Novel ===
Pretty Dudes: The Novel, a novelization of the first season was released on July 7, 2020. ISBN 9781955382427

=== RAM (Like the Verb) ===
In 2024, Calloway released RAM (Like the Verb), which centered on Charlit Dae's season two character Ram Takada. The film premiered on the film festival circuit.

== Reception ==
=== Critical reception ===
The show's first season received a positive response from critics who mostly praised its diversity and inclusive storylines. Philip Hernandez of Black Talent TV called Pretty Dudes "a one a kind web series." Asyiqin Haron of Geeks of Color called the show "incredibly diverse," highlighting the "great storytelling." It was listed as one of "9 Dope, Black Web Series To Dive into for the Summer" by Shadow and Act, called "extraordinary" and "the rare series that showcases nuanced friendship between gay and straight men" by Jordan Simon who went on to add, "If you love Noah's Arc, you will enjoy this.". While noting that Pretty Dudes seemed "created for the gay male and female gaze," Devin Randall complimented the "truly fleshed out story" in a review for Instinct Magazine. RIZEup Magazine called the series "trendsetting." In a negative review, queerguru said the series has a "lightweight plot" "intended to be watched only by other millenials."

=== Awards and nominations ===
Year	Awards	Category	Recipients	Result	Ref(s)
2017	NYPS Awards	Best Series	Pretty Dudes	Won	
2017	NYPS Awards	Best Performance by an Ally	Xavier Avila	Won	
2018	Asians on Film Festival of Shorts	Best Music Video	How We Break ("Pretty Dudes" Anthem)	Won	
2019	LGBTQ Shorts Film Festival	Best LGBTQ Short	Pretty Dudes: The Double Entendre	Nominated	
2019	Comedy Shorts Film Festival	Best Comedy Short	Pretty Dudes: The Double Entendre	Pending	
2024	Absurd Film Festival	Best LGBTQ+	RAM (Like the Verb)	Won	
2024	Chinatown International Film Festival	Best Director	Chance Calloway	Won	
2024	Chinatown International Film Festival	Best Documentary	RAM (Like the Verb)	Won	
2024	Chinatown International Film Festival	Best Visual Art	RAM (Like the Verb)	Won	
