= National Youth Pride Services =

The National Youth Pride Services (NYPS) is a non-profit organization located in Chicago, Illinois, that focuses on uplifting African American LGBTQ+ young people in the United States. NYPS's mission statement is: "To empower black LGBTQ young adults through leadership development, networking and collaborative events, in order to improve their quality of life."

== History ==
As early as the 1920s, Chicago has had gay neighborhoods and nightlife. As the rent increased, gay friendly neighborhoods were pushed up to Northern Chicago and into Boys Town, a well known gay neighborhood. In the 1960s, there were more politically active LGBTQ people who worked with the civil rights movement and had help from Chicago Gay Liberation. The state of Illinois became the first to repeal their sodomy law in 1961. In the 1980s, the LGBTQ Democrats were the main political party being involved in Chicago.

National Youth Pride services was founded in Chicago in 2003. As of July 2012, they had around 1,400 LGBT members ages 13 to 25.
