= Dante Basco =

American actor (born 1975)

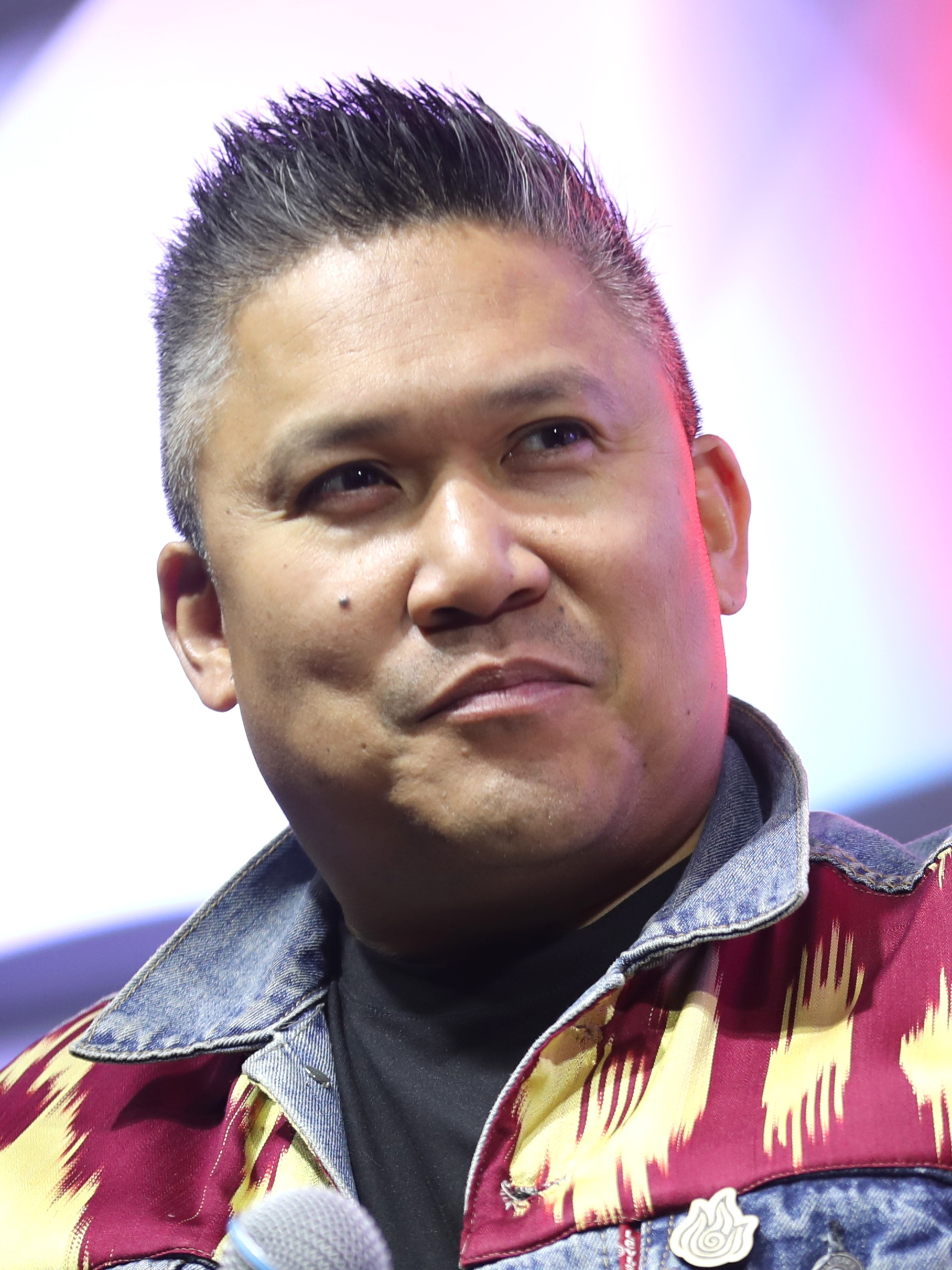
- Basco in May 2024
- Born: Dante Roman Titus Basco; August 29, 1975 (age 51); Pittsburg, California, U.S.
- Occupation: Actor
- Years active: 1988–present
- Spouse: Alice Rehemutula (m. 2023)
- Children: 1
- Relatives: Dion Basco (brother); Ella Jay Basco (niece)

Dante Roman Titus Basco (born August 29, 1975) is an American actor and poet. He is known for his role as Rufio, the leader of the Lost Boys, in Steven Spielberg's Hook, Dolph in the cult film But I'm a Cheerleader, the lead character Ben Mercado in the independent film The Debut, and for voicing the title character of American Dragon: Jake Long and Prince Zuko in Avatar: The Last Airbender.

His voice acting roles also include Zuko's grandson General Iroh II in The Legend of Korra, Quoc Wong in The Proud Family, Jingmei in The Boondocks, Tuck in Generator Rex, Scorpion in Ultimate Spider-Man, and Jai Kell in Star Wars Rebels.

== Early life ==
Basco was born to Filipino parents on August 29, 1975, in Pittsburg, California, and raised in Cerritos and Paramount, California. He has four siblings, including actor Dion Basco. In the mid-1980s, he and his brothers formed a breakdancing crew and worked as street performers. He attended Orange County High School of the Arts in the Music and Theatre Conservatory and graduated in 1993. One of his classmates was fellow actor Pedro Pascal.

In 1998, Basco co-founded the Da Poetry Lounge, a slam and spoken poetry venue in Hollywood.

== Career ==
He began his acting career with minor television roles. His breakthrough performance was when he appeared as Rufio, the leader of the Lost Boys in Steven Spielberg's 1991 film Hook with Robin Williams and Dustin Hoffman.

In 2017, Basco produced a Kickstarter-funded short film, Bangarang, about the character Rufio. The film was directed by Jonah Feingold.

Basco streams gameplay on Twitch.

Basco released his memoir From Rufio to Zuko through the independent publisher Not a Cult.

Avatar: Braving the Elements, an official Nickelodeon companion podcast to Avatar: The Last Airbender, premiered on June 22, 2021. Basco and Janet Varney (voice of Korra) host the podcast, which follows them as they rewatch the series, discuss each episode's key moments and behind-the scenes information, and feature special guests.

=== Voice acting ===
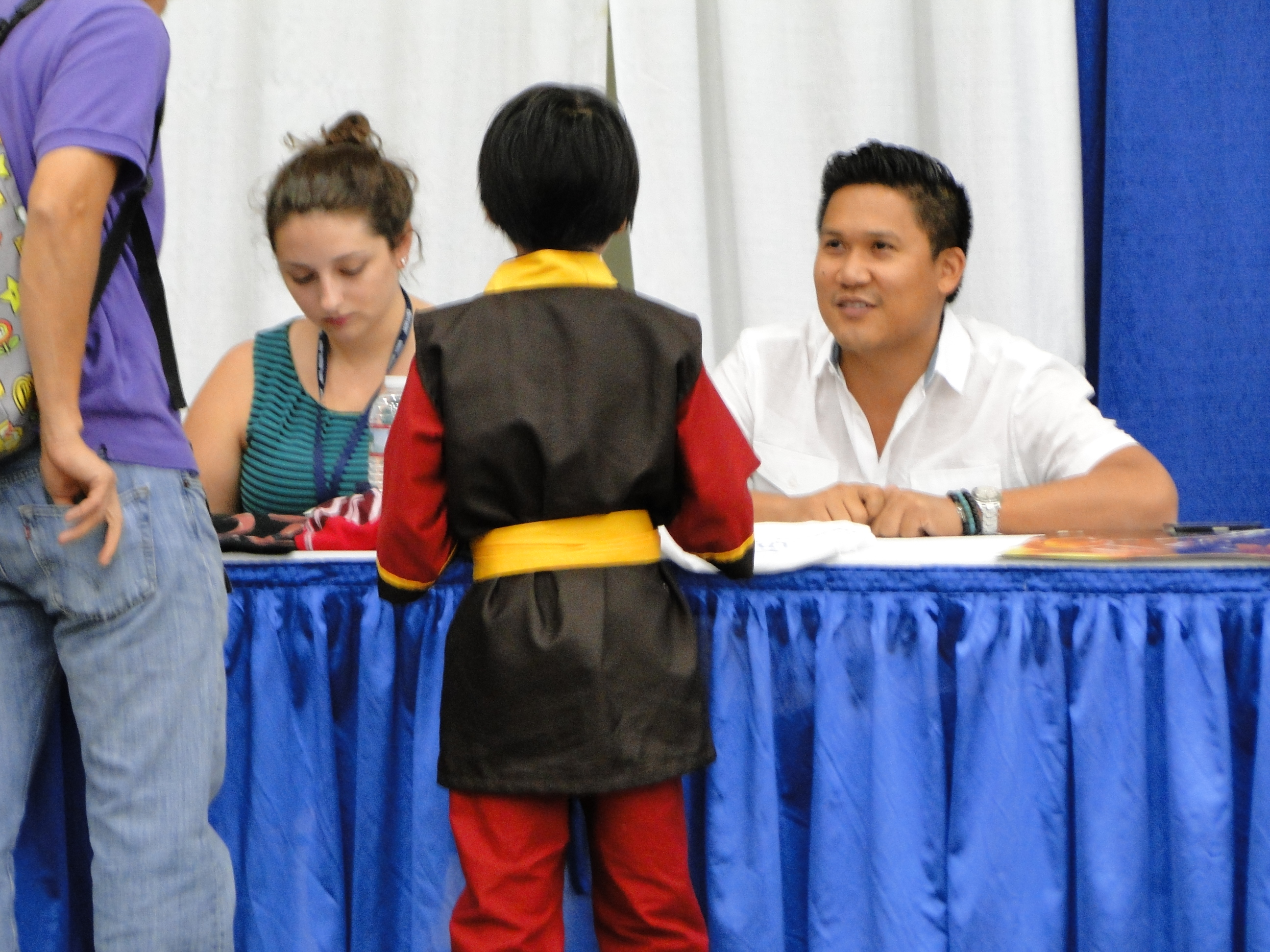
Basco talking to a Zuko cosplayer at Otakon 2014.

Basco has done voice acting for many animated productions, including Zuko in Avatar: The Last Airbender, Jai Kell in Star Wars Rebels and Jake Long in American Dragon: Jake Long. Additional roles include Kwok Wong in The Proud Family, Matt Martin/Kewl Breeze in Zevo-3, and General Iroh in The Legend of Korra.

He contributed additional voices for Aion, Mortal Kombat X, and Saints Row. He also voiced Shingo in the Skate series and Seeing Farther in the Call of Juarez series. Basco also voiced in Date Everything!

== Personal life ==
On April 19, 2023, Basco became engaged to filmmaker, actress and television host Alice Rehemutula. They married in September 2023 in China. Their son was born in October 2024.

== Filmography ==
Key
†	Denotes films that have not yet been released

=== Film ===
Year	Title	Role	Notes
1988	Moonwalker	Romeo	Uncredited; segment: "Bad"
1989	The Wizard	Corey's friend	Deleted Scenes
1990	Cold Dog Soup	Chinese Boy	
1991	The Perfect Weapon	Jimmy Ho	
1991	Hook	Rufio	
1995	A Goofy Movie	Additional voices	
1995	Fist of the North Star	Bat	Direct-to-video
1997	Fakin' da Funk	Julian Lee	
1999	But I'm a Cheerleader	Dolph	
2000	The Debut	Ben Mercado	
2001	Extreme Days	Corey Ng	
2003	Love Don't Cost a Thing	Spoken Word Artist	
2003	Biker Boyz	"Philly"	
2006	Take the Lead	Ramos	
2008	Nite Tales: The Movie	Gerard	
2009	Blood and Bone	"Pinball"	Direct-to-video
2011	Subject: I Love You	Nicky	
2014	JLA Adventures: Trapped in Time	Karate Kid	Voice, direct-to-video
2014	Cesar Chavez	Filipino Striker	
2014	Bad Asses	Gangly Asian	
2014	Murder101	D. Phillips	
2016	Jarhead 3: The Siege	Blake	
2019	The Creatress	Franklin	
2021	The Fabulous Filipino Brothers	Douglas "Duke" Abasta	Also director
2021	Monster Hunter: Legends of the Guild	Aiden	Voice

=== Television ===
Year	Title	Role	Notes
1988	The Wonder Years	Eddie, Kid #3	2 episodes
1988	Santa Barbara	Amado	4 episodes
1988	Dare to Say No	Asian Kid	Educational short film for EPCOT
1989	CBS Schoolbreak Special	Luis	Episode: "15 and Getting Straight"
1989	Highway To Heaven	"Champ" Hopkins	Episode: "Choices"
1989	Booker	Ping Pong	Episode: "Razing Arrizola"
1990	The New Adam 12	Manko	Episode: "Kid Kop"
1990	The Earth Day Special	Kid	Uncredited
1993	Raven	Lucas	Episode: "The Journey"
1993–1994	Hangin' with Mr. Cooper	Sammy	2 episodes
1995	500 Nations	Additional voices	3 episodes
1995	The Fresh Prince of Bel-Air	Kevin	Episode: "Cold Feet, Hot Body"
1995	Alien Nation: Body and Soul	Trash #2	Television film
1996	Nash Bridges	Jimmy Chang	Episode: "Home Invasion"
1997	Riot	Jeff Lee	Television film Segment: "Gold Mountain"
1996	Touched by an Angel	Robbie Hawkins	Episode: "Random Acts"
1998	Beyond Belief: Fact or Fiction	Rudy Hernandez	Episode: "Bright Lights/Magic Mightyman/The Student/Scribbles/County Mystery"
1998	Moesha	Marco	4 episodes
1998	Promised Land	Tito	Episode: "Out of Bounds"
1999	Viper	Rishi Lama	Episode: "Holy Terror"
1999	Undressed	Jake	5 episodes
2000	The Steve Harvey Show	Lee	Episode: "Guess Who's Not Coming to Counseling"
2001	A Kitty Bobo Show	Kitty Bobo	Voice, pilot
2001	The Chronicle	"Noodles"	Episode: "Here There Be Dragons"
2002	Providence	Justin Kim	Episode: "All the King's Men"
2002	The Proud Family	Quoc Wong	Voice, 2 episodes
2003	Kim Possible	Fukushima	Voice, episode: "Exchange"
2004	Johnny Bravo	Filipino, Man #3	Voice, episode: "Win an El Toro Guapo/Witch-ay Woman"
2004	That's So Raven	Phil	4 episodes
2005–2007	American Dragon: Jake Long	Jake Long	Voice, main role
2005	Lilo & Stitch: The Series	Jake Long	Voice, episode: "Morpholomew"
2005–2008	Avatar: The Last Airbender	Prince Zuko	Voice, main cast (50 episodes)
2006	Entourage	Fukijama	Episode: "What About Bob?"
2007	The Suite Life of Zack & Cody	Madrid	2 episodes
2009	Community	Bully's Friend #2	Episode: "Comparative Religion" (uncredited)
2010	The Boondocks	Jingmei	Voice, episode: "The Red Ball"
2010	Dark Blue	"June Bug"	Episode: "Jane Wayne"
2010	Zevo-3	Matt Martin / Kewl Breeze	Voice, 6 episodes
2010	Firebreather	Kenny Rogers	Voice, television film
2010	CSI: Miami	Ruben Franco	Episode: "Happy Birthday"
2010–2012	Generator Rex	Tuck	Voice, 3 episodes
2011	Prime Suspect	Bounce	Episode: "Carnivorous Sheep"
2012	Hawaii Five-0	Nicky Chang	Episode: "Pu'olo (The Package)"
2012–2014	The Legend of Korra	General Iroh	Voice, 6 episodes
2013	Ultimate Spider-Man	Scorpion	Voice, 2 episodes
2014	Star Wars Rebels	Jai Kell	Voice, 4 episodes
2018	A Million Little Things	Cory	2 episodes
2019	We Bare Bears	Cheddar	Voice, episode: "Baby Orphan Ninja Bears"
2019	Drunk History	The Rabbit	Episode: "The Rabbit"
2019–2020	Victor and Valentino	Javier	Voice, 2 episodes
2020	Carmen Sandiego	Spinkick	Voice, 2 episodes
2021	Trese	Bagyon Kulimlim	Voice, 2 episodes
2021	Robot Chicken	Squall Leonhart, Looky Loo, Zuko	Voice, 2 episodes
2022	Little Demon	Ignatius	Voice, 2 episodes
2023	Blindspotting	Himself	Episode: "By Hook or by Crook"
2023	Almost Paradise	Jace Vargas	3 episodes; recurring role
2024	The Dragon Prince	Zym / Azymondias	Voice; episode: "Nova"
2026	Hey A.J.!	Karate Trevor	Voice; episode: "Not the Hiccups/The Captain Durag Effect"
TBA	The Dragon King †	Zym / Azymondias	Voice; in production; funded by a Kickstarter campaign

=== Web series ===
Year	Title	Role	Notes
2014–2019	Nostalgia Critic	Himself	6 episodes
2016–2019	Camp Camp	Billy "Snake" Niksslip	Voice
2018–2020	Star Wars: Galaxy of Adventures	The Narrator	Voice
2020	Let's Read Homestuck	Rufioh Nitram	Voice, episode: "Act 6 Intermission 3 - Part 7"
2020	Death Battle	Zuko	Voice, episode: "Zuko VS Shoto Todoroki (Avatar vs My Hero Academia)"

=== Video games ===
Year	Title	Role
2006	Saints Row	Stilwater's Residents
2006	Call of Juarez	Sees Farther
2006	Scarface: The World Is Yours	Additional voices
2006	Avatar: The Last Airbender	Zuko
2007	Skate	Shingo
2007	Avatar: The Last Airbender – The Burning Earth	Zuko
2008	Avatar: The Last Airbender – Into the Inferno	Zuko
2008	Aion	Additional voices
2009	Terminator Salvation	Resistance Soldiers
2009	Call of Juarez: Bound in Blood	Seeing Farther
2009	Skate 2	Shingo
2010	Final Fantasy XIII	Cocoon Inhabitants
2010	Skate 3	Shingo
2011	Nicktoons MLB	Prince Zuko
2015	Mortal Kombat X	Additional voices
2025	Date Everything!	Dante

== Awards ==
- Young Artist Award – Hook
  - Won – Best Ensemble Cast
  - Nominated – Best Young Actor

== See also ==
- List of Filipino Americans
