= Yoshi Sudarso =

Indonesian-American actor (born 1989)

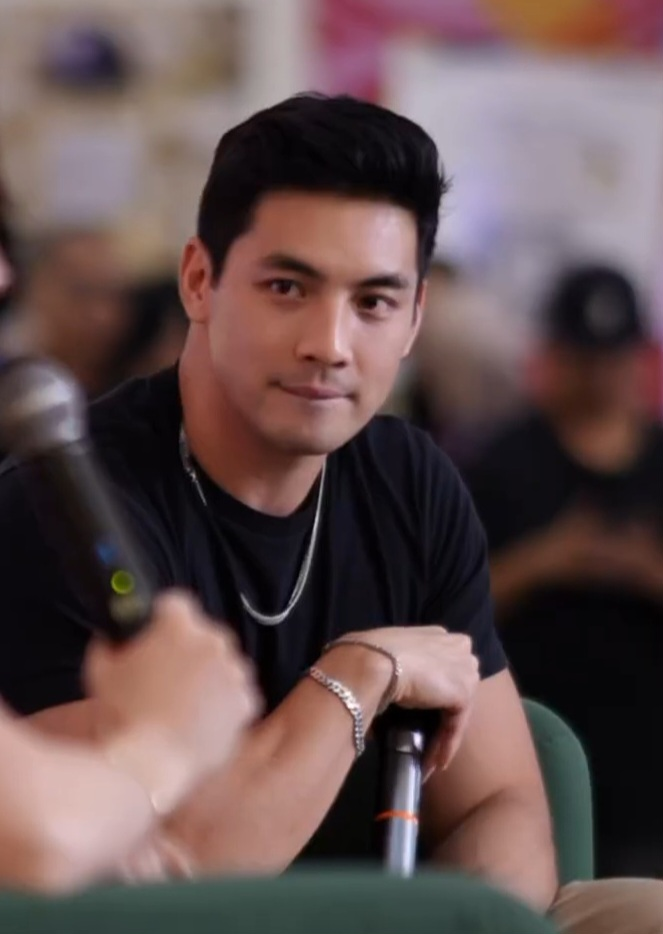
- Sudarso in 2024
- Born: Yoshua Sudarso; April 12, 1989 (age 37); Surabaya, East Java, Indonesia
- Occupations: Actor; film producer; stunt performer; model
- Years active: 2007–present
- Spouse: Sarah Garcia (m. 2015)
- Children: 2

Yoshua “Yoshi” Sudarso (born April 12, 1989) is an Indonesian-American actor, stunt performer, film producer, and model.

== Early life ==
Sudarso was born on April 12, 1989, in Surabaya, Indonesia to Indonesian parents of Chinese descent. His family moved to Cerritos, California, when he was nine years old. He studied at Cal State Long Beach initially pursuing a career in math and accounting before eventually switching to theater. Sudarso has one younger brother, Peter Adrian Sudarso, who is also an actor and model.

== Career ==
Sudarso began his career working in stunts working on major motion pictures and television shows such as The Maze Runner, Agents of S.H.I.E.L.D., Alita: Battle Angel and more.

Sudarso was a suit-actor for Power Rangers Samurai and Power Rangers Megaforce before he was finally cast in a main role as Koda for Power Rangers Dino Charge.

He was cast as the lead in Mike Wiluan's Indonesian-language spaghetti western film Buffalo Boys. The film was the first project back in his home country. The movie became Singapore's submission for the Oscars Foreign Film category.

In August 2018, he joined the cast of the Manila-set independent drama Empty by Design and starred alongside Rhian Ramos, Osric Chau and Chris Pang. The same month, it was announced he joined the cast in a key supporting role in his second Indonesian-language project Milly & Mamet, a spin-off from Riri Riza's popular Ada Apa Dengan Cinta? franchise, alongside Sissy Priscilla and Dennis Adhiswara.

In 2022, Sudarso starred in the David Leitch action film, Bullet Train, as the younger version of Hiroyuki Sanada's character, "the Elder."

== Filmography ==
Television and film roles
Year	Title	Role	Notes	Refs
2010	Easy A	Eric Ling	Film; uncredited	
2013	My Life as a Video Game	The Noobkiller	1 episode	
2014	It's Not You, It's Me	Ian	TV miniseries	
2015	Shuriken Sentai Ninninger	Tourist	1 episode	
2015	Super Power Beat Down	Spider Man	1 episode	
2015	Apt. 210 Confessional	Josh Adrien	TV miniseries	
2015–2016	Power Rangers Dino Charge	Koda	Main roles	
2016	NCIS: Los Angeles	Aaron Kim	1 episode	
2016	Agents of S.H.I.E.L.D.	Hydra Agent	1 episode; uncredited	
2016–2019	Pretty Dudes	Sunji	Main role	
2017	K.C. Undercover	Enemy Agent	1 episode	
2018	Power Rangers Hyperforce	Joe Shih	Recurring role, 9 episodes	
2018	The Thundermans	Hockey Goon Brock	1 episode	
2018	Power Rangers Super Ninja Steel	Koda	3 episodes	
2018	Buffalo Boys	Suwo	Film	
2018	Milly & Mamet: Ini Bukan Cinta & Rangga	James	Film	
2019	Empty by Design	Marco	Film	
2019	At Your Service	Benson Wu	1 episode	
2020	Power Rangers Beast Morphers	Koda	2 episodes	
2020	Project Power	Knifebones	Film; uncredited	
2020	The Paper Tigers	Teen Danny	Film	
2020	Avatar: The Last Airbender: Agni Kai	Zuko	Fan film	
2021	Serigala Langit	Herman Laksono "Jaguar"	Film	
2022	Death's Diner	Death	Short film	
2022	Bullet Train	Young Elder	Film	
2022	Blade of the 47 Ronin	Sun	Film	
2023	Escape from Love	David Hasen	Film	
2024	The Brothers Sun	Lance Wang	Episode: "Gymkata"	
2025	Ratu Ratu Queens: The Series	Bisma	Recurring cast	
TBA	Shadow Transit		Film	
